= Gedye =

Gedye is an English surname. Notable people with the surname include:

- George Eric Rowe Gedye (1890–1970), British journalist, author and intelligence officer
- Graham Gedye (1929–2014), New Zealand Test cricketer
- Mary Gedye (1834–1876), Australian watercolourist and Landscape painter
- Charles Townsend Gedye (1833–1900), 19th Century Australian shipping magnate
