= Conrad Martens =

British artist (1801–1878)

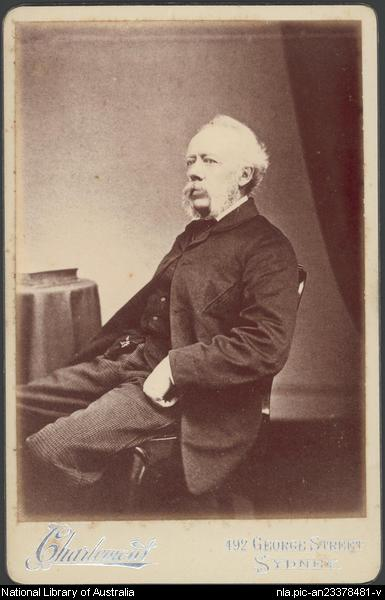
- Portrait of Conrad Martens, National Library of Australia
- Born: 21 March 1801; London, England
- Died: 21 August 1878 (aged 77); North Sydney, New South Wales, Australia
- Known for: Watercolour painting

Conrad Martens (21 March 1801 – 21 August 1878) was an English-born landscape painter active on HMS Beagle from 1833 to 1834. He arrived in Australia in 1835 and painted there until his death in 1878.

== Life and work ==
Conrad Martens' father, J. C. H. Martens, was an Austrian-born merchant who originally came to London as Austrian Consul. Conrad was born in 1801 at Crutched Friars near Tower Hill. After his father's death in 1816, he determined to pursue a career as an artist studying landscape painting under the prominent watercolourist Copley Fielding. His two brothers, John William and Henry, were also artists.

In 1832 Captain Blackwood of HMS Hyacinth asked him join his three-year cruise to India as a topographical artist. In Montevideo near the end of 1833, he heard Robert FitzRoy, captain of HMS Beagle, who was employed in surveying the Straits of Magellan, wanted to engage an artist to replace the ship's artist Augustus Earle, who had fallen ill. In this way he joined the second voyage of Beagle and stayed on board for some two years, until the schooner which accompanied them was paid off and the officer who had command of her returned to Beagle, meaning there was no longer room for Martens. While on board Martens struck up a lifelong friendship with Charles Darwin, who was taking part in the expedition as a self-financing gentleman naturalist and companion to the captain.

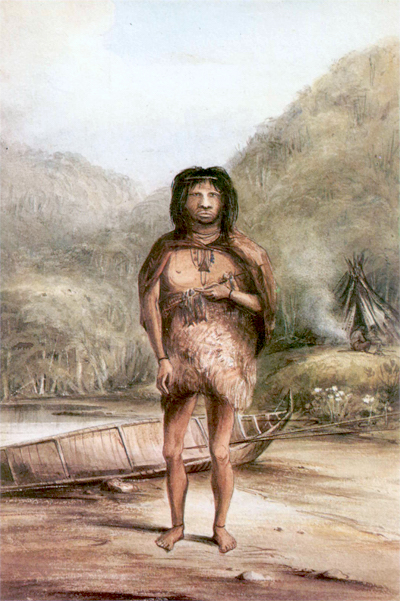
A watercolour of a native from Tierra del Fuego, painted by Martens when he and Charles Darwin visited the area during the Voyage of the Beagle (1832/34).

Martens left Beagle at Valparaíso in the second half of 1834 and took passage to Tahiti and many of the South Sea islands, including New Zealand, before arriving in Sydney 1835. Martens arrived in the colony with a valuable collection of sketches, which he at first intended to take back to his friend Blackwood in India, but finding his pictures were appreciated in Sydney, he found constant employment and decided to remain.

He went on to become one of the most proficient, prominent and prolific landscape artist in the colony. Beagle arrived in 1836, and Darwin and Captain Fitzroy commissioned a number of paintings from Beagle's voyages in Tierra Del Fuego and the Pacific. Other large commissions followed, and in 1837 some of Martens' Australian watercolours were exhibited at the Royal Society in London. In 1839, however, a drought triggered an economic recession which was to last until the 1850s, and commissions became increasingly difficult to acquire. In the 1840s he turned to lithographs, which allowed him to sell the same work many times over; his View of Sydney from the North Shore was especially popular.

Conrad Martens married Jane Carter, of Welsh heritage and the only child of William and Jane Carter at St James Church, Sydney, on 9 March 1837. Jane's father, a private barrister and First Master in Chancery of the Supreme Court of New South Wales, had purchased Martens' painting View of Tahiti in September 1836.

In late 1851 Martens sailed to Brisbane, then travelling back by road across the Great Dividing Range to the Darling Downs, then south through New England to Sydney. En route, he lodged with squatters and pastoralists, drawing their houses and properties and hoping for commissions. The plan succeeded, and Martens was eventually commissioned to paint over seventy watercolours, nearly forty of which are still known today. Between 1841 and 1852 he travelled through the Newcastle and Hunter Valley regions; much of his collection was digitized at the State Library of New South Wales.

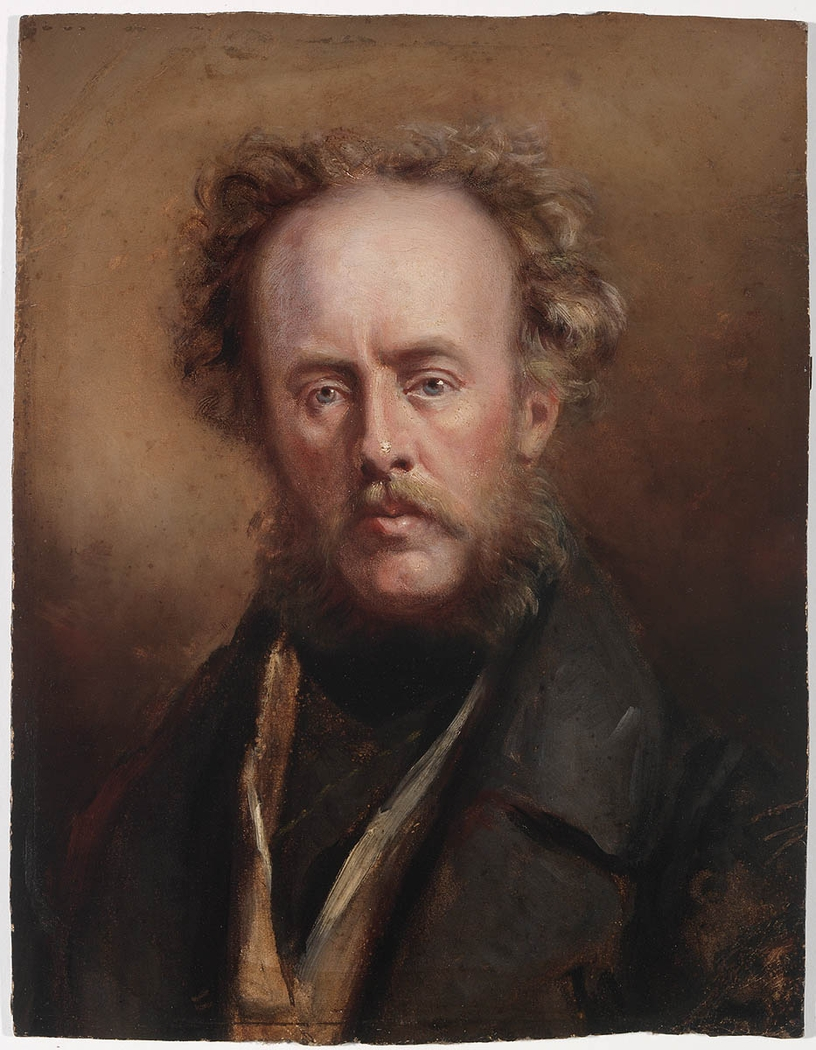
Felton Conrad Martens, ca. 1840 painted by Maurice Felton

He exhibited at the Victorian Fine Arts Society in Melbourne in 1853 and at the Paris Universal Exhibition in 1855. Eventual improvement of the Australian economy in the later 1850s (largely due to the discovery of gold) led to an increase in significant commissions. A famous painting is North Head, Sydney Harbour (1854).

In 1862 he received a letter from Darwin; he replied, congratulating him on the success of On the Origin of Species. He sent Darwin a watercolour of Brisbane River and exhibited at the International Exhibition in London. In 1863 he became Assistant Librarian in the Parliamentary Library, securing his financial position, but severely curtailing the time he could spend on artistic work. Nevertheless, he exhibited at the Paris International Exhibition in 1867 and found time to tutor aspiring talented Australians such as Mary Gedye. He received his first public commission in 1872, from the Victorian Gallery (later National Gallery of Victoria) for a watercolour of Apsley Falls on Waterloo (Pastoral) Station, near Walcha, New South Wales, and a second similar commission in 1875 from the New South Wales Academy of Arts (later Art Gallery of New South Wales), of whose Council he became a member in 1877.

From the later 1860s Martens suffered from angina, and he died from a heart attack on 21 August 1878. He was buried at a private ceremony at St Thomas Rest Park, North Sydney, and was carried to his grave by Sir John Hay, Dr Ward, Mr Slade, Mr Marshall Bailey, and Captain Mann.

Like many artists Martens was not universally acknowledged in his lifetime, but by 1910 his works were displayed in pride of place at the opening of the Mitchell Gallery at the State Library of New South Wales. In particular it was watercolours that were at this time singled out for praise: "As works of art they rank high. As pictorial gems of our early story they are beyond price."

== Selected works ==
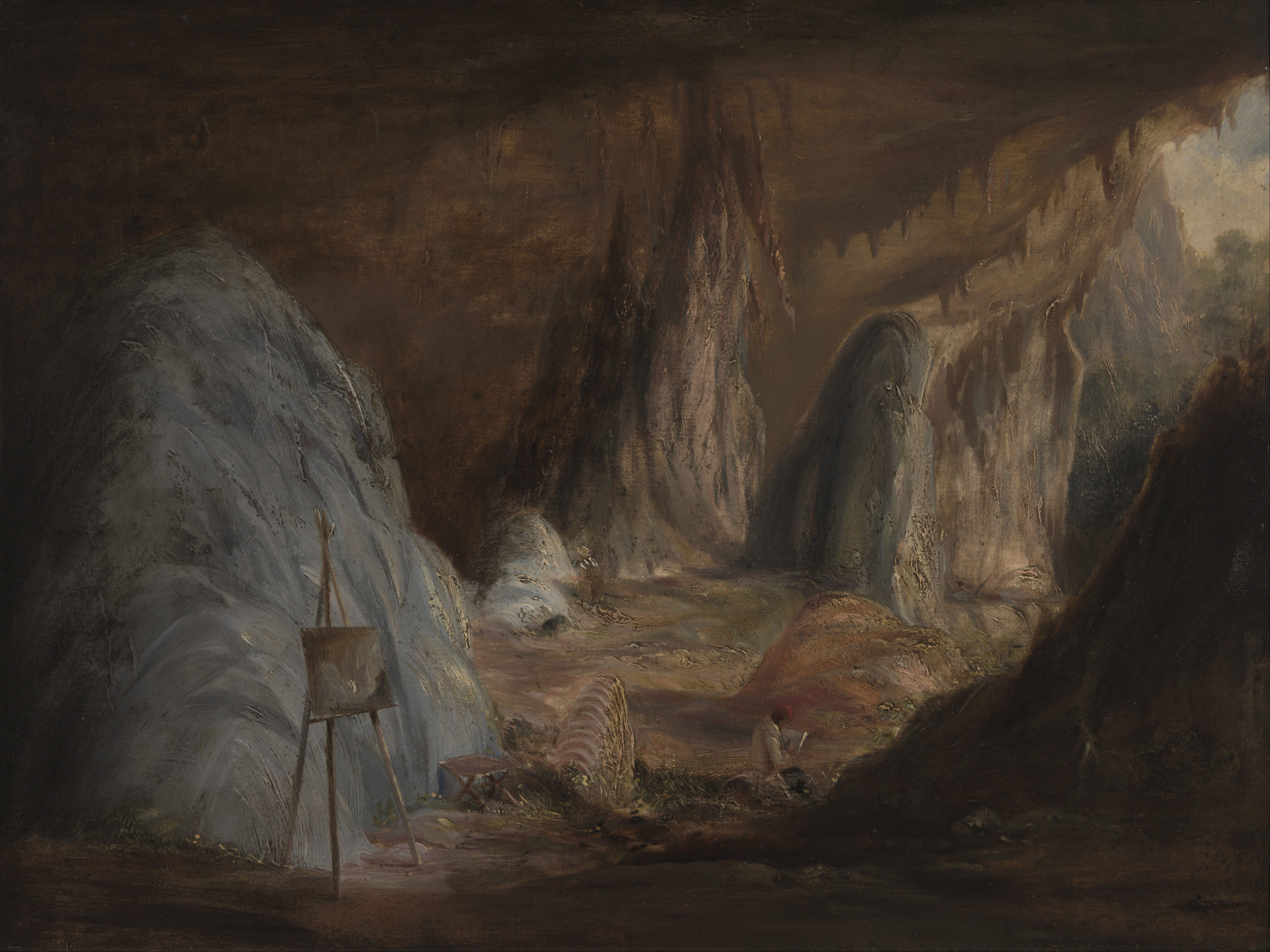
Stalagmites, Burragalong Cavern

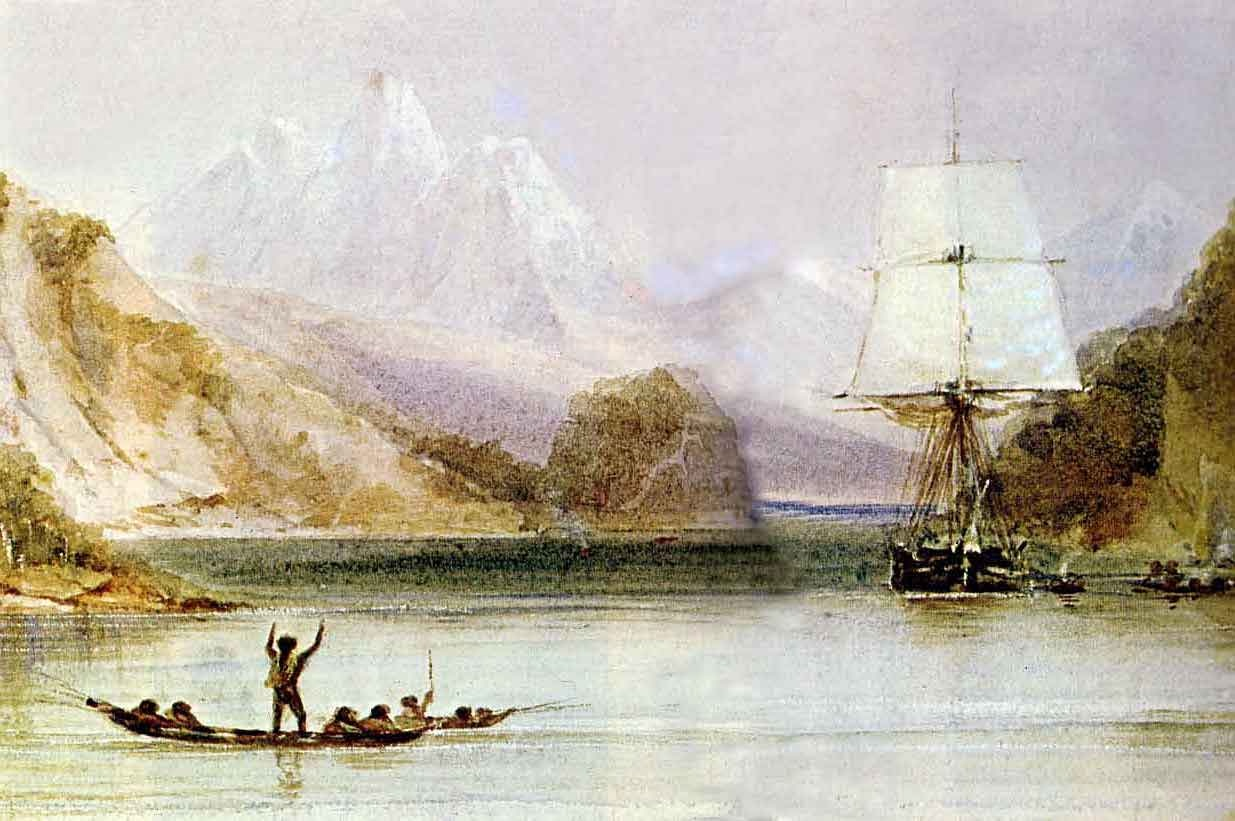
HMS Beagle being hailed by native Fuegians

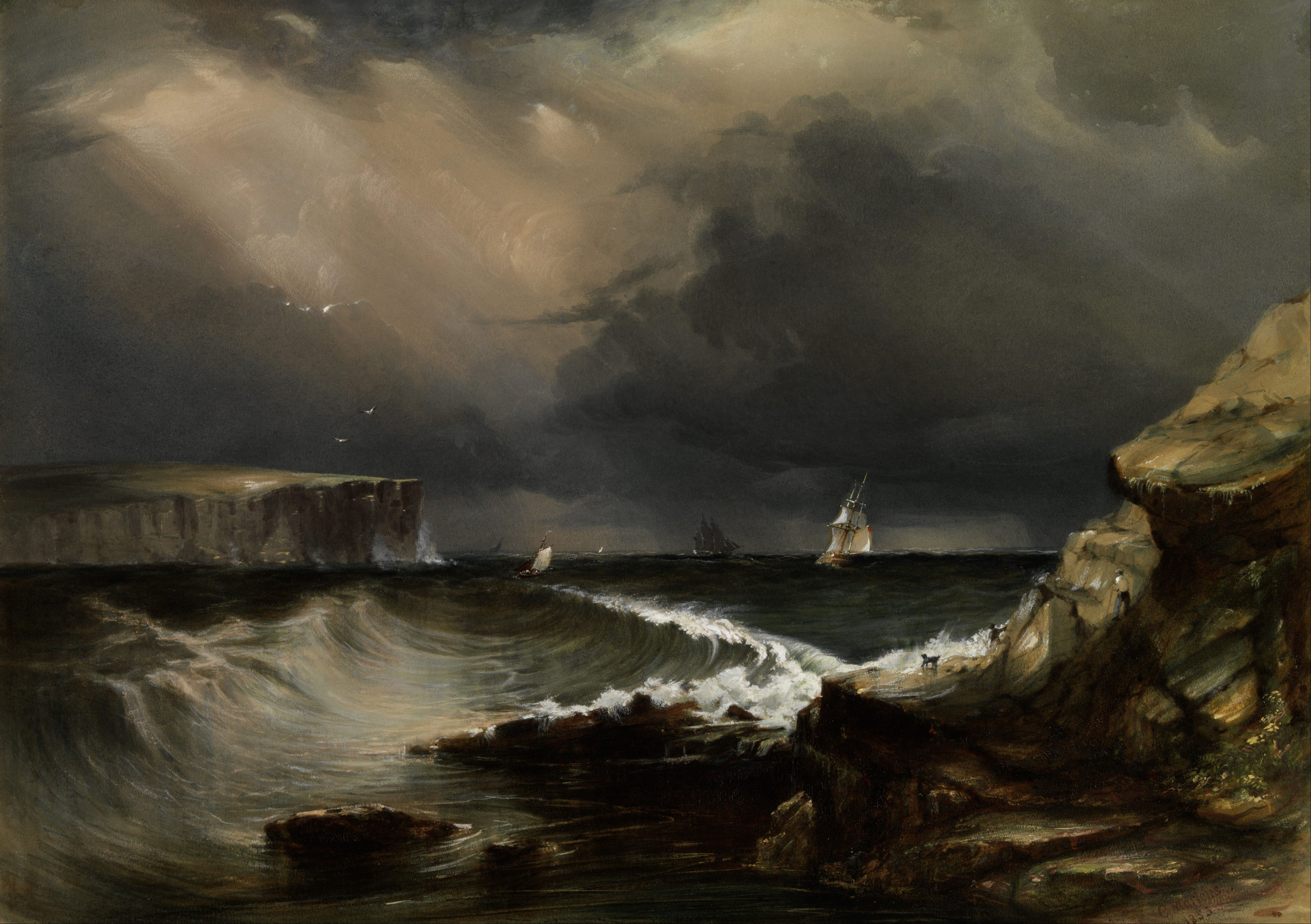
View of the Heads, Port Jackson

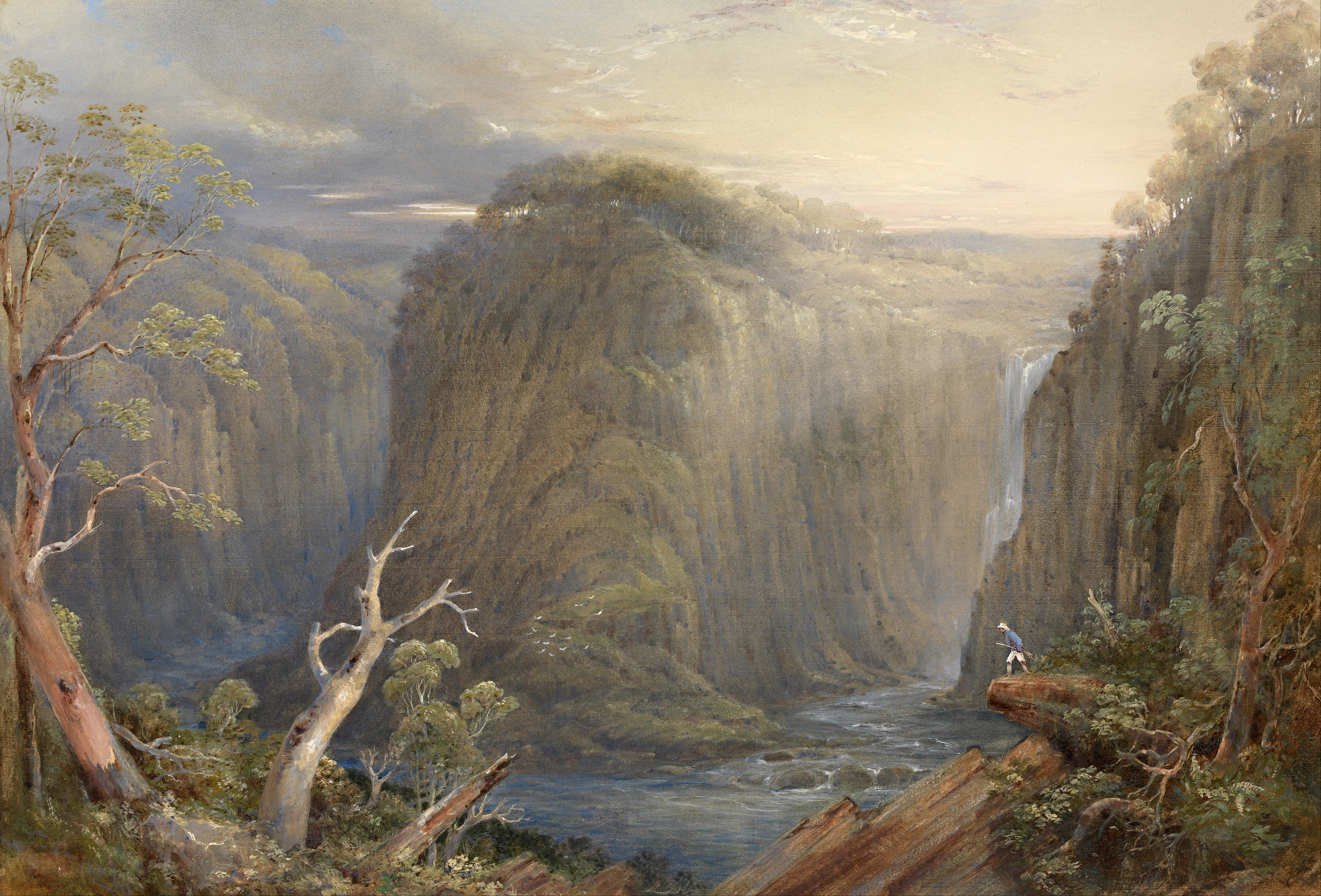
One of the falls on the Apsley River

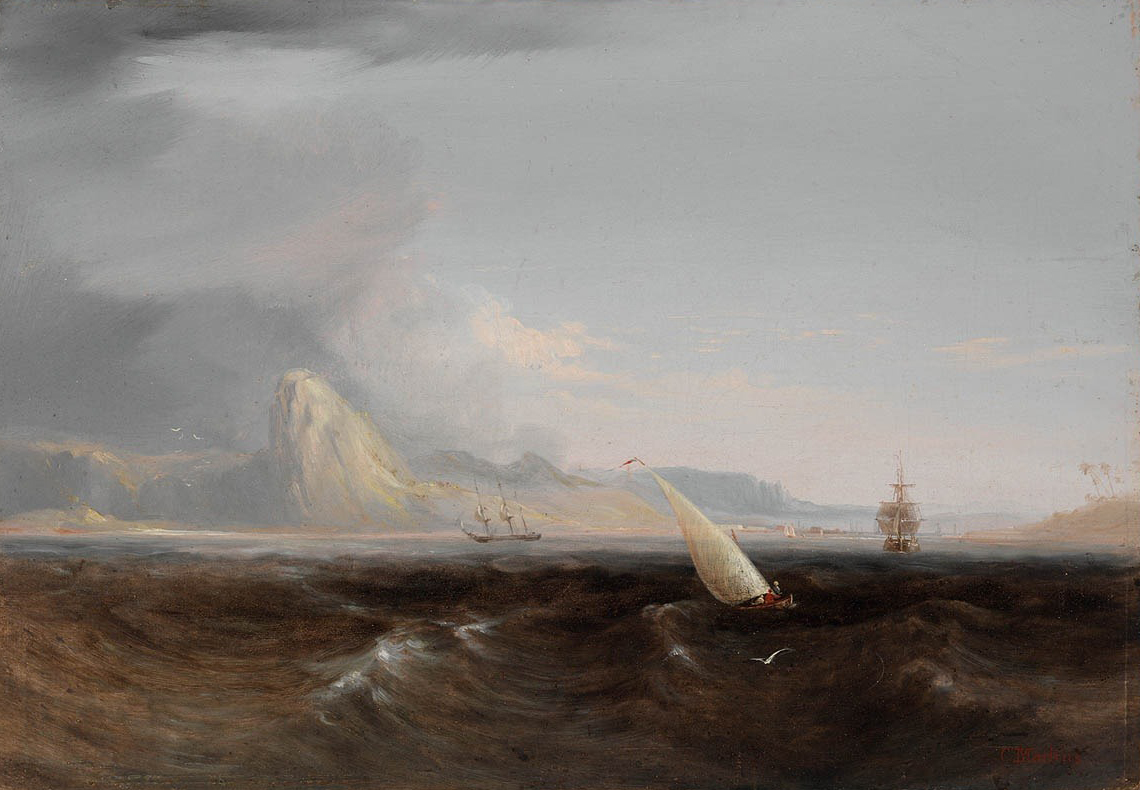
Tahiti, 1840, Conrad Martens, oil painting

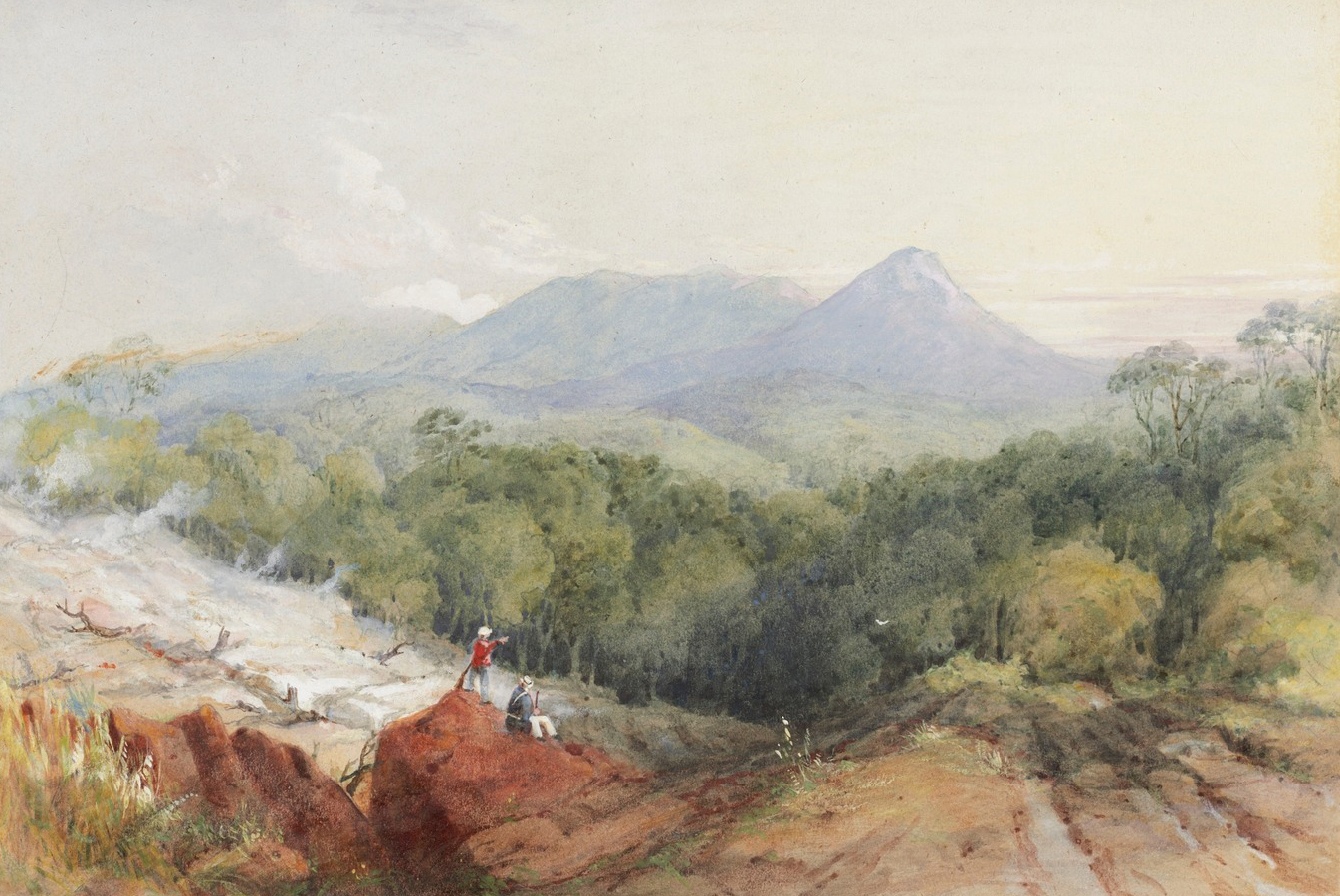
Mount Wingen, New South Wales, 1878, Conrad Martens, watercolour

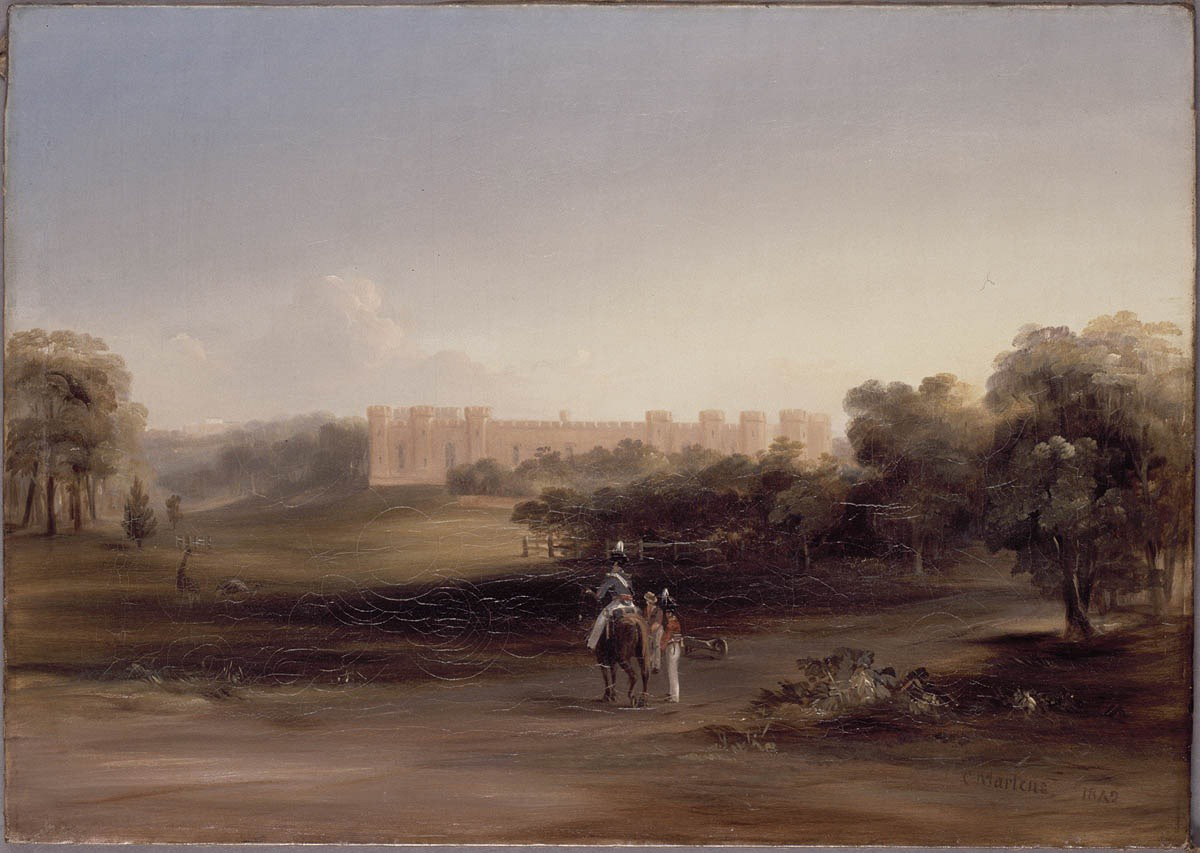
Government House Stables, 1842, Conrad Martens

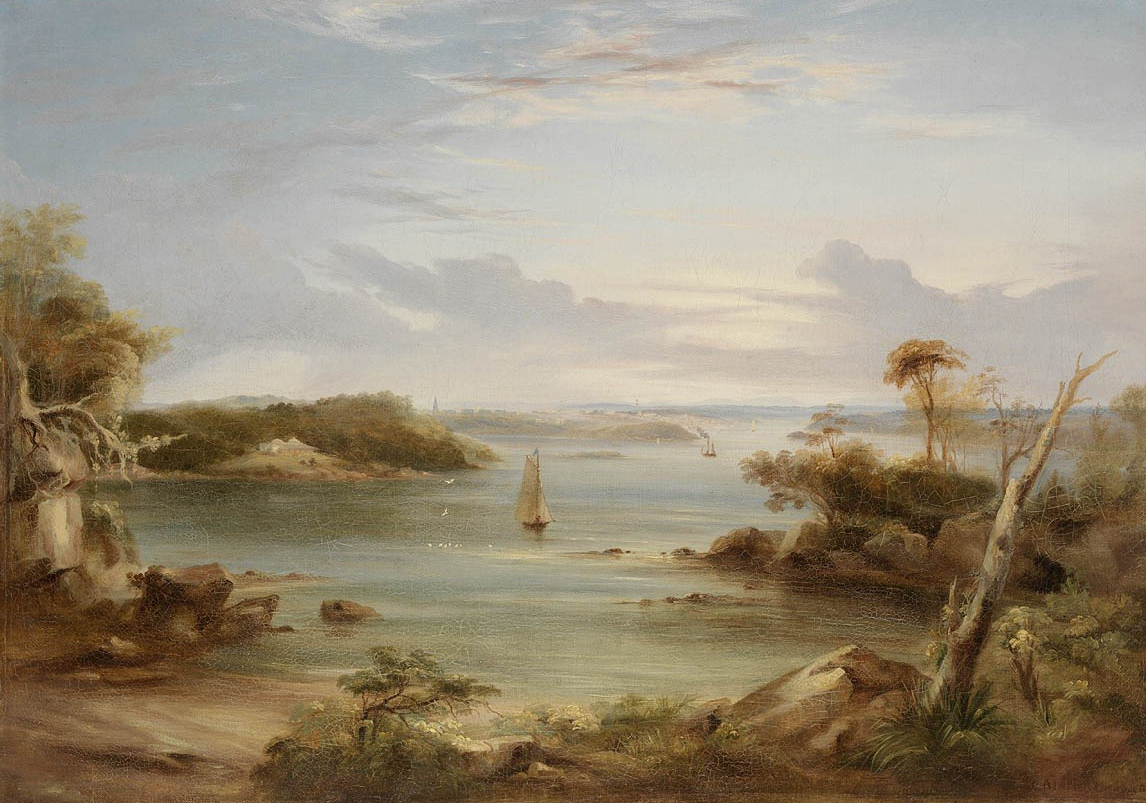
Sydney from (Sandy) Rose Bay, 1840, Conrad Martens

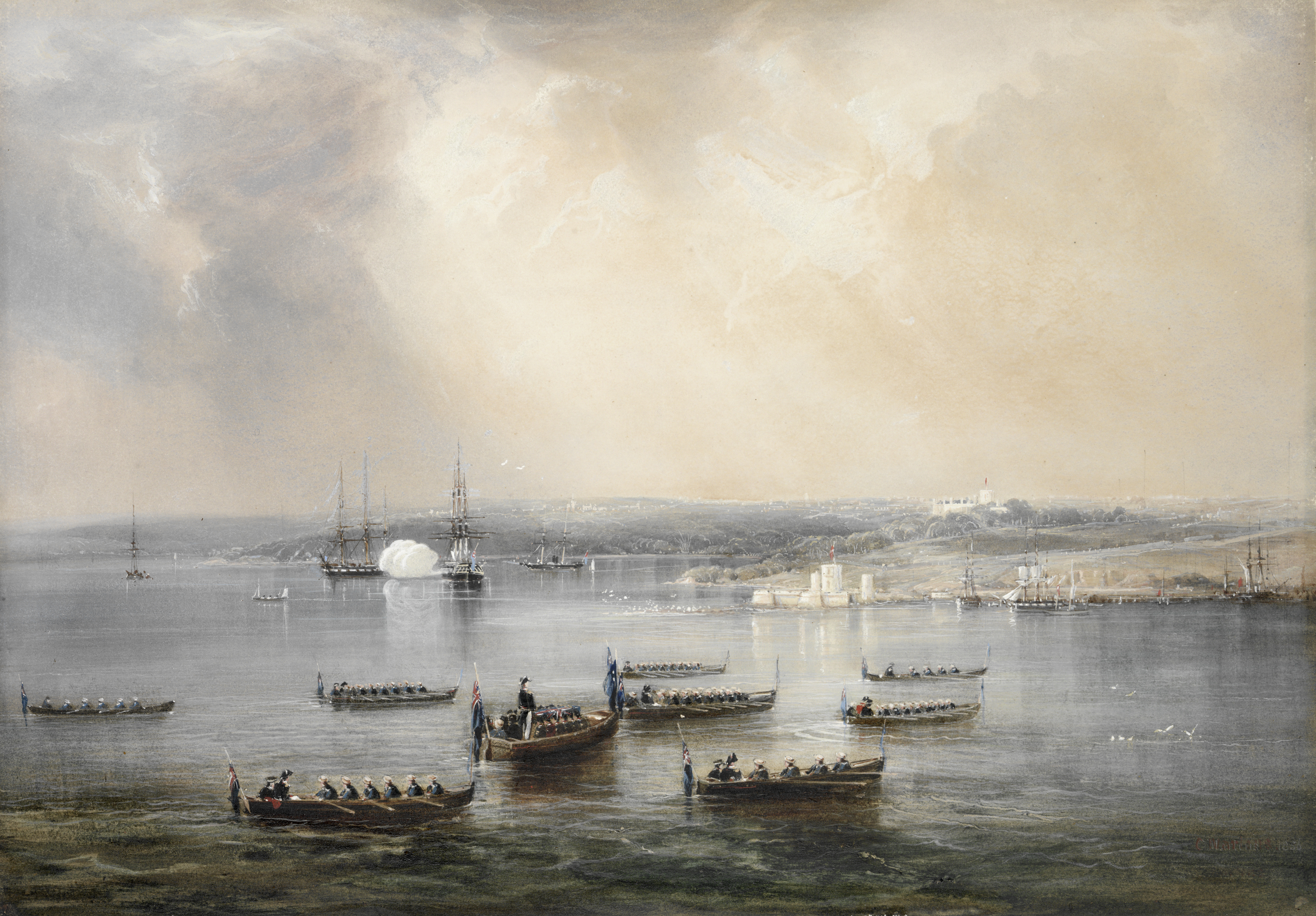
The Funeral of Rear Admiral Philip Parker King, Sydney, 1856, by Conrad Martens

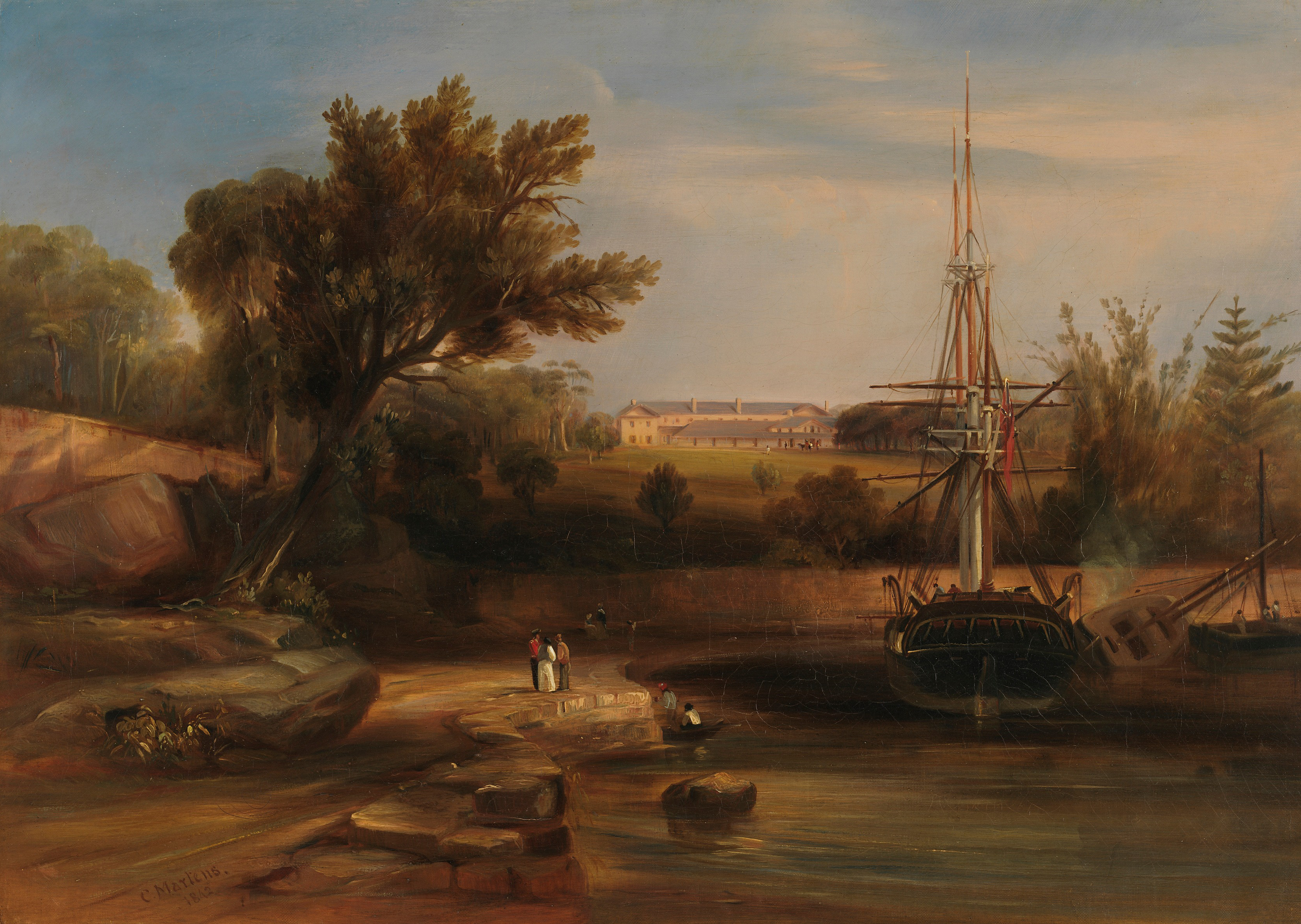
Old Government House, 1842, Conrad Martens

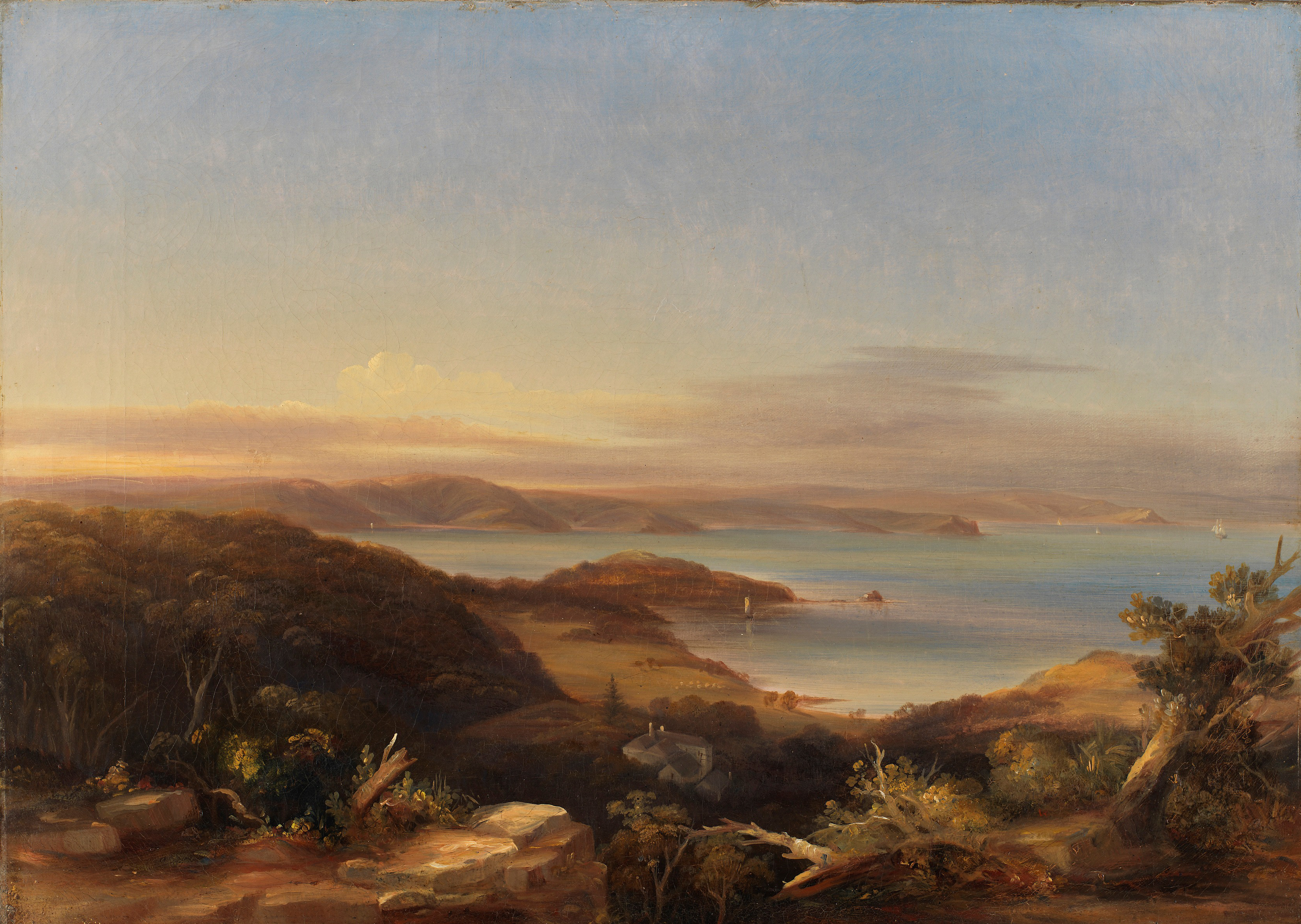
Vaucluse from the Hill, 1841, Conrad Martens

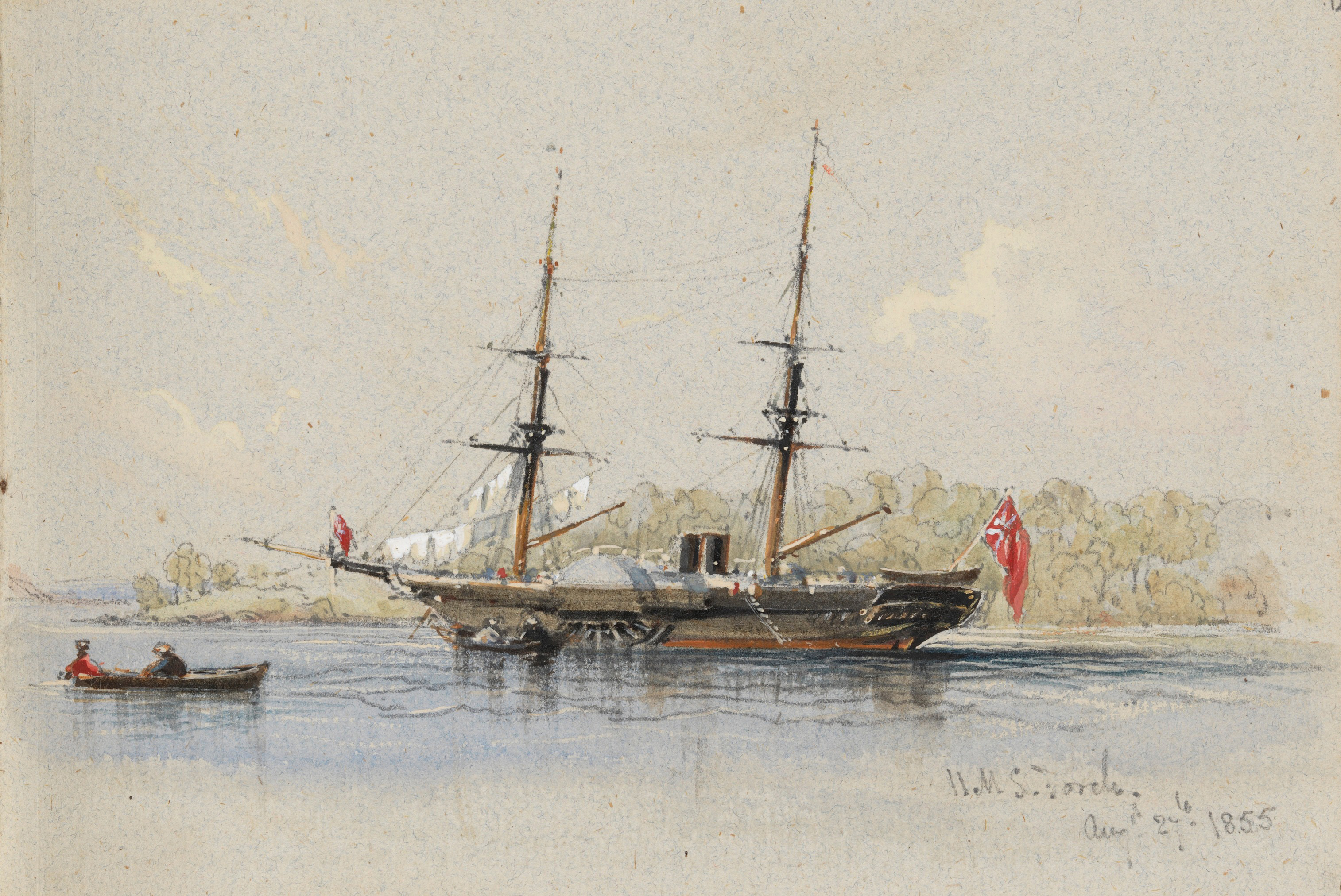
HMS Torch, Sydney. 1855, watercolour sketch by Conrad Martens

== List of Sketchboooks ==
- Devonshire, ca. 1830, 17 watercolour, pencil, pencil and wash drawings by Conrad Martens, State Library of New South Wales DL PX 10
- Pencil sketches in Devonshire, ca. 1831-1832 10 pencil sketches by Conrad Martens, bequeathed by D.S. Mitchell, 1907, State Library of New South Wales PXC 388
- Album of sketches around Sydney, ca. 1843–1852, 49 pencil sketches, 18 pencil and wash sketches, and 3 watercolours by Conrad Martens, bequeathed by Sir William Dixson, 1952, State Library of New South Wales DL PX 25
- Album of pencil sketches and lithographs, ca. 1836–1859, 12 pencil sketches, 3 pencil and wash sketches, and 9 lithographs by Conrad Martens, donated by Colonel A.E. Knox, 1960, State Library of New South Wales PXC 971
- Sketchbook of Devonshire views, ca. 1830–1831, 20 pencil sketches, 4 watercolours by Conrad Martens, bequeathed by D.S. Mitchell, 1907, State Library of New South Wales PXC 390
- Sydney sketchbook, ca. 1835–1842, 39 pencil, or pencil and wash sketches by Conrad Martens, bequeathed by D.S. Mitchell, 1907, State Library of New South Wales PXC 391
- Album of sketches of Sydney and surrounds, ca. 1835–1870, 21 pencil sketches, and 3 pencil and wash sketches by Conrad Martens, donated by Colonel A.E. Knox, 1960, State Library of New South Wales PXC 970
- Sketchbook of English scenes, ca. 1820–1830, 45 watercolour, pencil, and sepia wash drawings by Conrad Martens, bequeathed by Sir William Dixson, 1952, State Library of New South Wales DL PX 11
- Album of harbourside and mountain scenes, ca. 1837–1860, 10 pencil drawings, 5 watercolours, 1 pencil and wash sketch and 1 colour lithograph by Conrad Martens, bequeathed by Sir William Dixson, 1952, State Library of New South Wales DL PXX 12
- Album of sketches in England and Sydney, ca. 1831, 13 pencil sketches, 3 grey wash drawings, and 7 watercolours, and 1 oil by Conrad Martens, bequeathed by Sir William Dixson, 1952, State Library of New South Wales DL PX 31
- Sketchbook of scenes in and around Sydney, ca. 1855–1856, 21 pencil and 19 pencil, watercolour and wash drawings by Conrad Martens, bequeathed by Sir William Dixson, 1952, State Library of New South Wales DL PX 16
- Sketchbook of views around Scone, ca. 1862–1874, 22 pencil drawings with additional manuscript notes by Conrad Martens, bequeathed by Sir William Dixson, 1952, State Library of New South Wales DL PX 18
- Sketchbook of harbour and bush scenes, ca. 1856–1872, 2 watercolours, 4 pencil and watercolour, 23 pencil drawings, with additional manuscript notes by Conrad Martens, bequeathed by Sir William Dixson, 1952, State Library of New South Wales DL PX 17
- Album of views in Devon, 1828–1832, 27 pencil sketches by Conrad Martens, bequeathed by Sir William Dixson, 1952, State Library of New South Wales DL PX 35
- Sketchbook of figures and scenes, ca. 1850–1854, 1 crayon, 28 pencil, 9 ink, 12 watercolours, and 12 loose drawings by Conrad Martens, bequeathed by Sir William Dixson, 1952, State Library of New South Wales DL PX 15

== Family ==
Martens was married to Jane Brackenbury Martens, née Carter (died 6 July 1894). They had a son and two daughters; the elder daughter, Rebecca Martens (1838 – 10 July 1909) was a long-serving secretary and supporter of the St Leonards branch of the British and Foreign Bible Society. She was an artist, known for watercolours. Their other two children died before them.

== See also ==
- Australian art
