= HMS Herald (1824) =

Atholl-class corvette launched in 1822

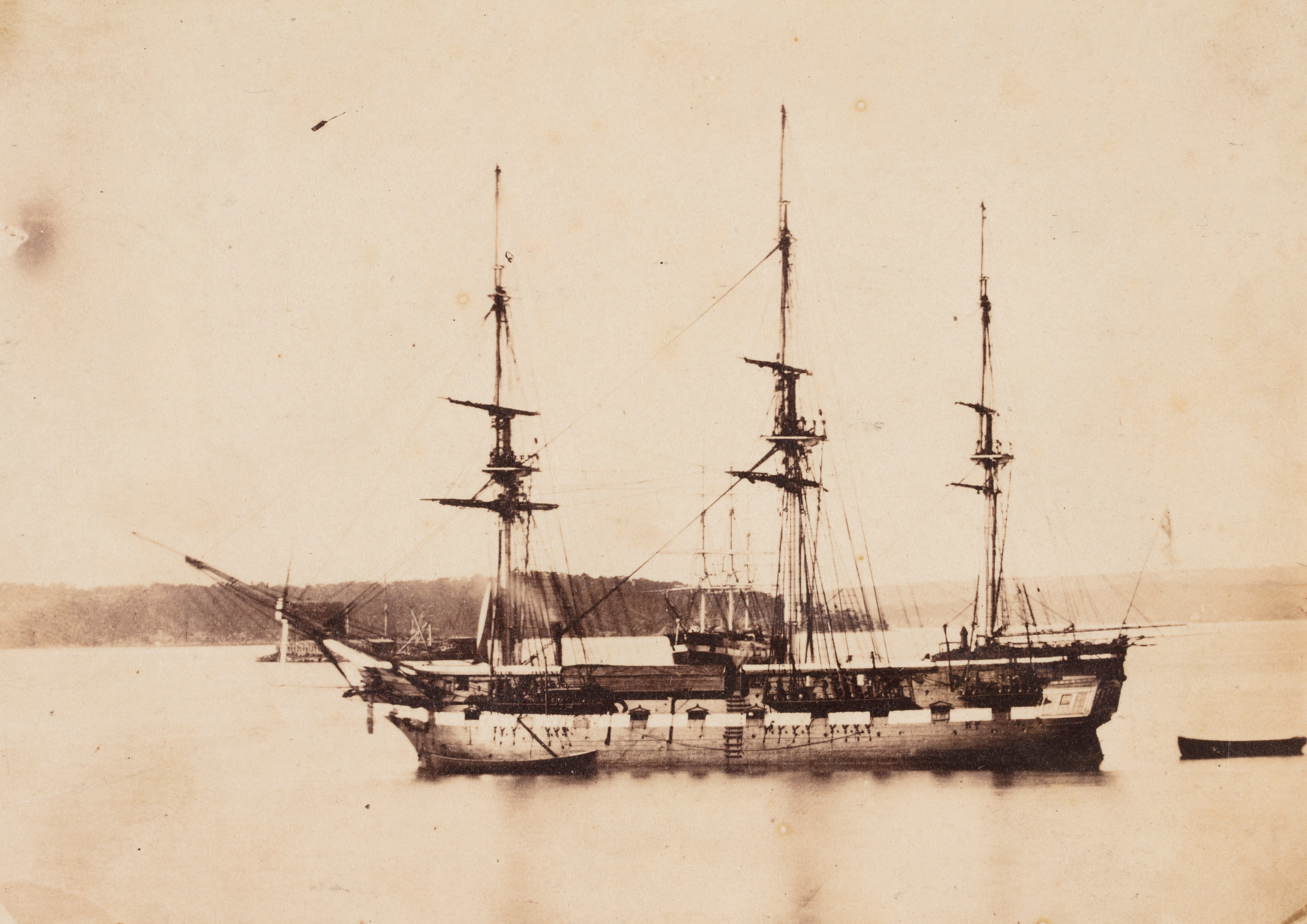
- HMS Herald in Sydney Harbour, 1857, albumen print.

History

United Kingdom
- Name: HMS Herald
- Ordered: 5 June 1819
- Builder: East India Company dockyard, Cochin, British India
- Laid down: March 1820
- Launched: 15 November 1822
- Commissioned: 16 July 1824
- Renamed: Launched as HMS Termagant in 1822; Renamed Herald on 15 May 1824
- Reclassified: Survey vessel in June 1845; Chapel ship in 1861
- Fate: Sold for breaking on 28 April 1862

General characteristics
- Class & type: Atholl-class 28-gun sixth-rate corvette
- Tons burthen: 499 91/94 (bm)
- Length: 113 ft 8 in (34.6 m) (gundeck); 94 ft 8 3/4 in (28.9 m) (keel)
- Beam: As built:31 ft 10 in (9.7 m); For tonnage:31 ft 6 in (9.6 m)
- Depth of hold: 8 ft 9 in (2.67 m)
- Sail plan: Full-rigged ship
- Complement: 175
- Armament: Upper deck: 20 × 32-pounder (25 cwt) carronades; QD: 6 × 18-pounder carronades; Fc: 2 × 9-pounder guns

HMS Herald was an Atholl-class 28-gun sixth-rate corvette of the Royal Navy. She was launched in 1822 as HMS Termagant, commissioned in 1824 as HMS Herald and converted to a survey ship in 1845. After serving as a chapel ship from 1861, she was sold for breaking in 1862.

== Construction and career ==
Termagant was launched at the East India Company dockyard at Cochin, British India on 15 November 1822. Lieutenant Robert Wallace Dunlop commissioned on 30 July 1822 to sail her to the United Kingdom. She arrived at Portsmouth on 7 July 1823. In July Captain Lord Henry Frederick Thynne took command, though he had nominally been appointed about a year earlier, on 30 July 1822.

=== Atlantic service ===
The vessel was renamed Herald on 15 May 1824, and commissioned on 16 July 1824. At this time she was rated a yacht. Commander Henry John Leeke recommissioned her on 31 May 1824. He sailed her to St Petersburg, the West Indies, back to England from Havana, then to Quebec, and finally to Malta. Captain Sir Augustus William James Clifford recommissioned Herald on 27 May 1826 to carry the Duke of Devonshire on an embassy to Russia. Commander Henry Eden replaced Clifford in November 1826, only to hand over command to Commander Edward William Curry Astley in April 1827.

On 7 April 1829 Commander George Berkeley Maxwell replaced Astley. Maxwell sailed Herald to St Petersburg, Cartagena, Quebec, and home. Herald was paid off in 1830. She then underwent fitting for sea between April and July 1830. On 20 November 1830 Captain Robert Godon took command at Portsmouth. He paid her off in January 1831. Herald then underwent fitting for sea again between November 1837 and August 1838.

=== Pacific service ===
Captain Joseph Nias

Captain Joseph Nias recommissioned Herald on 24 May 1838 for the East Indies and China. On 26 August 1839, Herald and HMS Pelorus attempted to scuttle the British merchant ship Lucretia, which had caught fire off Kyardbilly's point, Sydney, New South Wales. The attempt was unsuccessful and the ship exploded and sank.

On 29 April 1840 Nias sailed Herald, with Major Thomas Bunbury of the 80th Regiment (appointed by Governor William Hobson as Commissioner) and Edward Marsh Williams as interpreter, to take a copy of the Treaty of Waitangi (known as the "Herald-Bunbury" copy) to the South Island of New Zealand to obtain signatures from Māori chiefs as part the process of claiming British sovereignty over New Zealand.

During the period 1841–1842 she was involved in actions off Canton in the fleet commanded by Sir William Parker in the First Anglo-Chinese War (1839–1842), known popularly as the First Opium War. Herald was paid off at Chatham in 1842.

=== Survey and scientific work ===
Herald was converted at Sheerness to a survey ship between July 1844 and June 1845. At that time her armament was reduced to eight guns. Henry Kellett recommissioned Herald 8 February 1845 for surveying in the Pacific. She left Plymouth on 26 June 1845 and sailed first via Brazil to the Falkland Islands where she arrived in September. They then rounded Cape Horn into the Pacific. Together with HMS Pandora under Lieutenant-Commander James Wood she spent three years surveying the coast of British Columbia after the Oregon boundary dispute with the United States., and on the Pacific coast of South America.

Herald was assigned in 1848 to join the search for Sir John Franklin, whose ships had disappeared exploring the Northwest Passage. Herald sailed three times through the Bering Strait, in 1848, 1849 and 1850. No trace of Franklin was found. During this period she discovered Herald Island, in the Chukchi Sea, which Kellett named after his ship. In 1848 and 1849 Herald returned south in the months of the northern winter to continue surveying work in Panama, Costa Rica, and the Gulf of California. In October 1850, Herald left the Arctic, and sailed for home via Hawaii, Hong Kong, Singapore and the Cape of Good Hope, arriving at Spithead on 6 June 1851, thus completing a six-year circumnavigation of the globe.

Berthold Seemann was the naturalist for most of this voyage, and wrote the main account of the expedition in two volumes as well as an illustrated volume on the botany. Samson (1998) has provided a modern overview of his work, relating it to the political and economic context of the period. Edward Forbes subsequently published on the zoology of the expedition.

Chart of the Pacific coast from Panama to Ecuador, surveyed by Kellet and Wood. This 1958 edition is based mainly on the original survey.

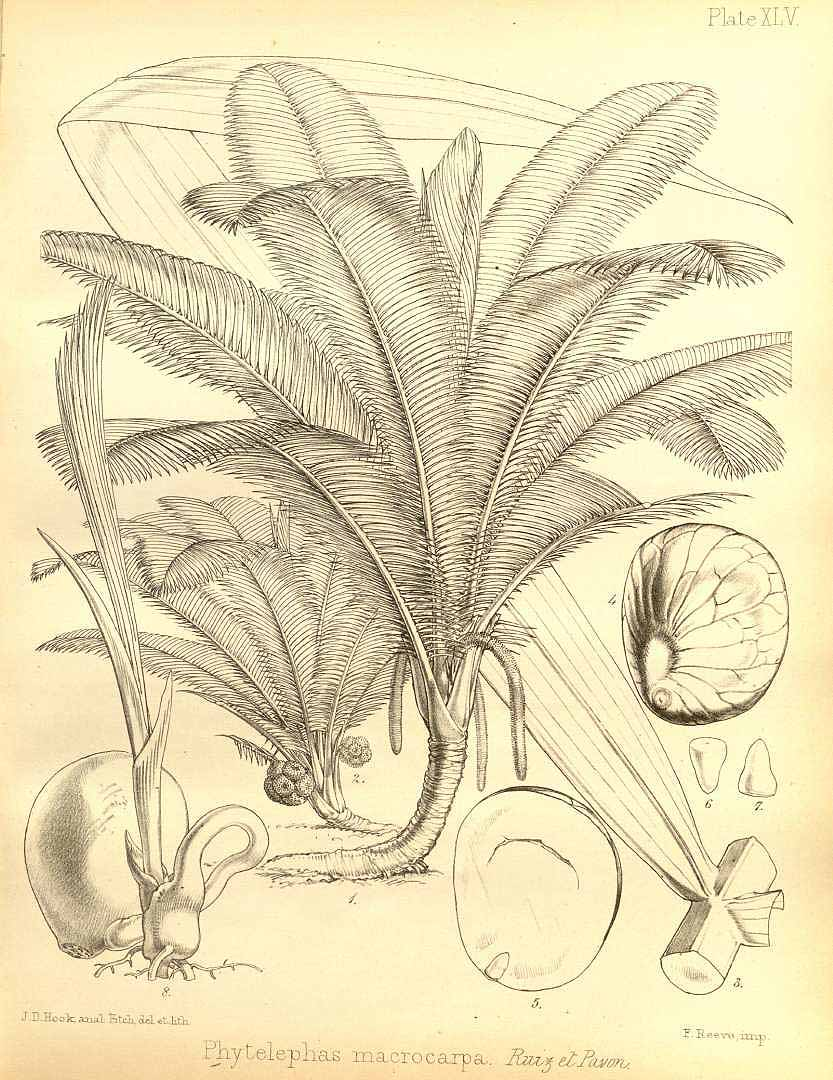
Phytelephas macrocarpa, the palm that produces vegetable ivory, found in coastal areas of Central America and northern South America. From Seemann (1857)

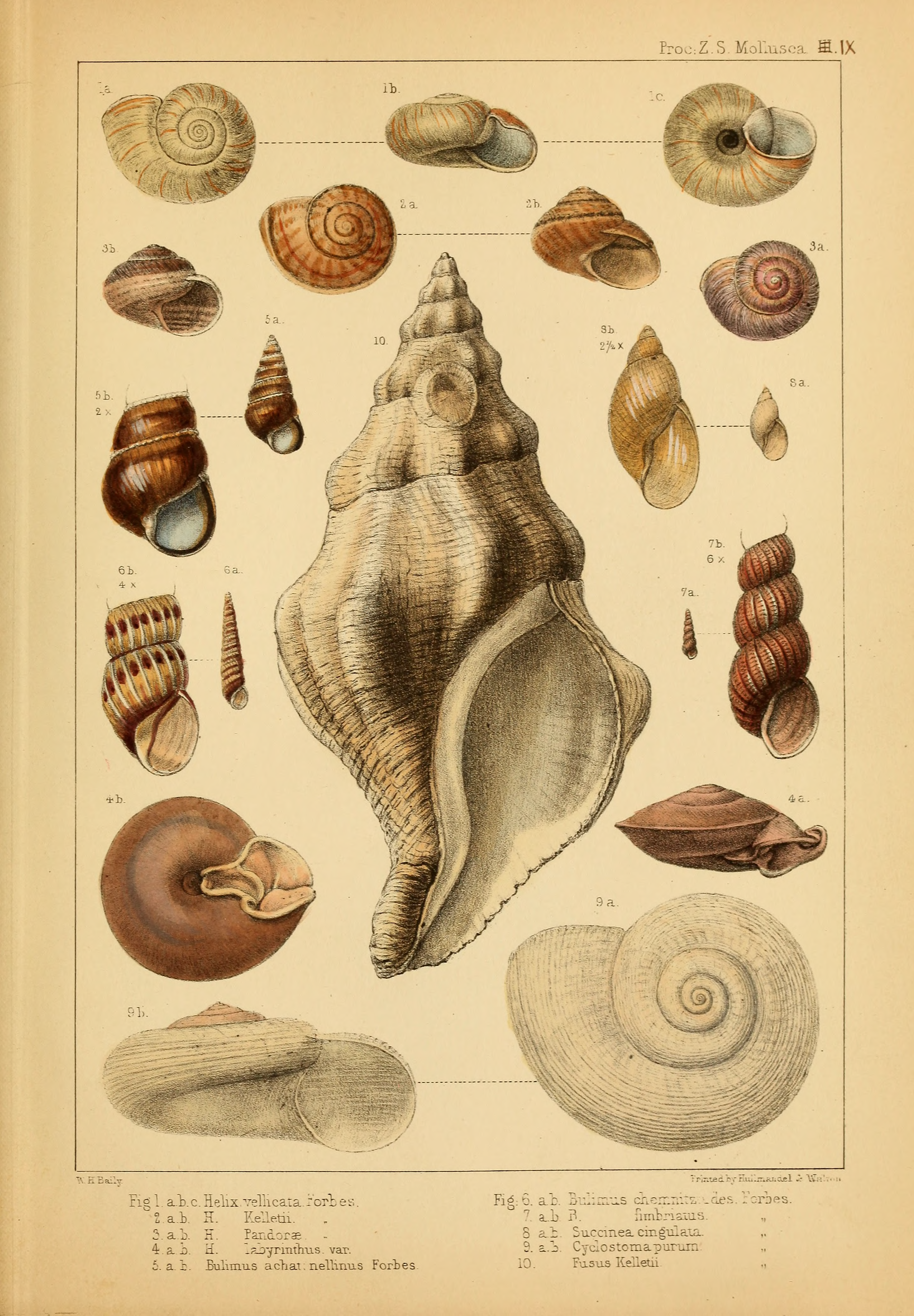
Molluscs from the voyage, from Forbes (1850)

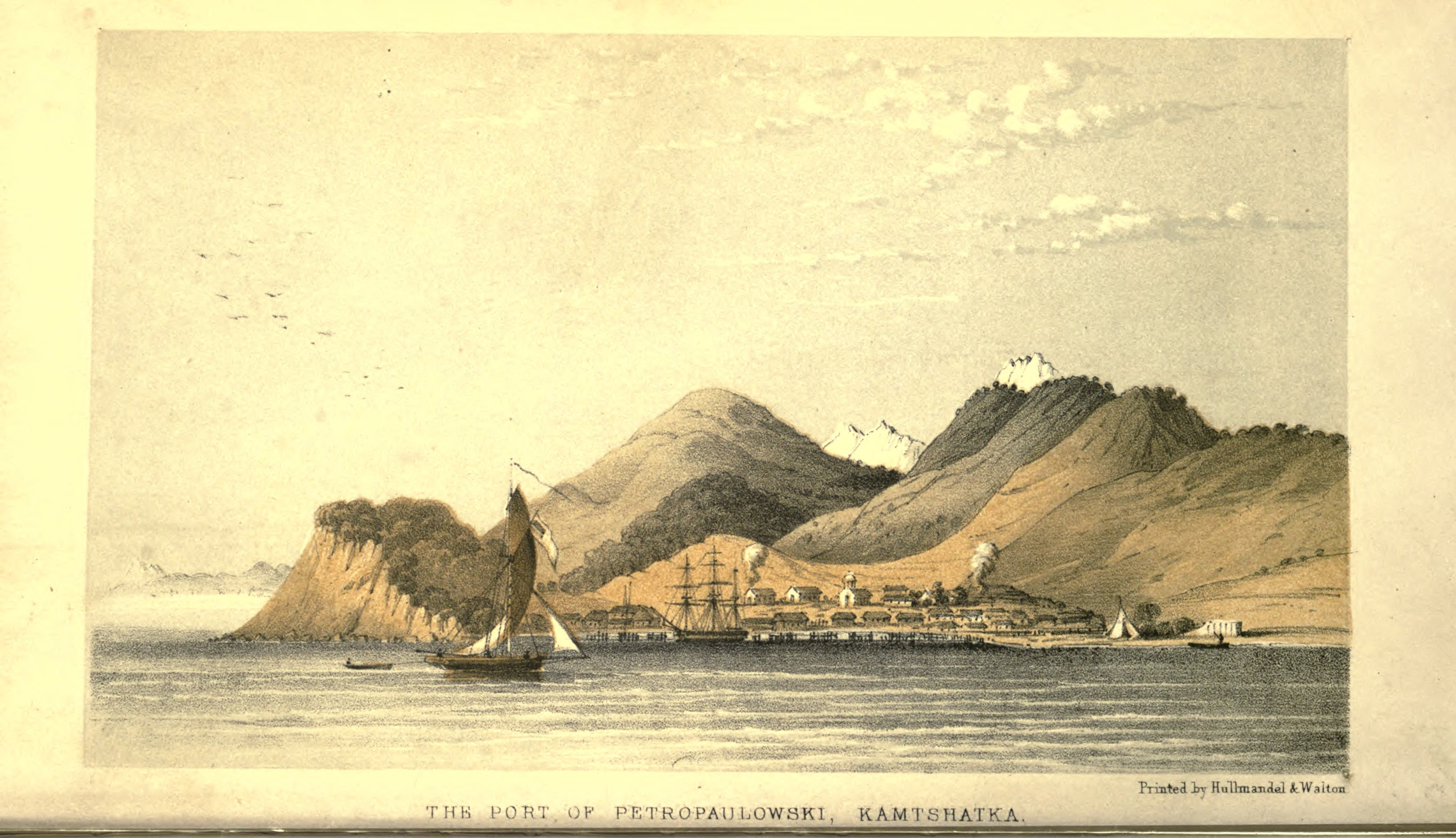
Petropavlosk in Kamchatka, Russian port of call for Herald en route to the Bering Strait.

From 1852 to 1861, under the command of Captain Henry Mangles Denham, Herald carried out a survey of the Australian coast and Fiji Islands, continuing the mission of HMS Rattlesnake. The naturalists on the voyage were John MacGillivray (1821–1867), William Milne (botanist) and Denis Macdonald as Assistant Surgeon-zoologist. James Glen Wilson was the ship's artist. Among the crew was Francis Hixson.

Herald, with her tender HMS Torch, a paddle steamer' left Plymouth on 10 June 1852. They travelled via Madeira and the Cape Verde Islands, Rio de Janeiro, Tristan de Cunha, Cape Town and St Paul Island, arriving at Port Jackson (Sydney Harbour) on 18 February 1853. Throughout the journey, surveying work was carried out, including deep-sea soundings, locating shoals, magnetic observations, establishing an accurate meridian distance between Rio and Cape Town, and a complete survey of St Paul Island. Many natural history onservations were made. The rest of the year 1853 was spent surveying Lord Howe Island and the nearby Ball's Pyramid and in New Caledonia and Vanuatu. Surveys were carried out of the Isle of Pines, Maré and Aneityum. These islands are close to the route between Sydney and Fiji, so it was important to chart their accurate positions.

On 27 May 1854, Herald sailed for Fiji via Auckland and Raoul Island. Herald surveyed in the south of Fiji, and obtained accurate positions for the Minerva Reefs, and also enabled numerous doubtful hazards to be removed from the charts. Between 1854 and 1857, Herald made three surveying trips to Fiji, greatly adding to the small-scale survey that had been carried out by Charles Wilkes in 1840. During this period, Herald also surveyed Norfolk Island and assisted in the resettlement of the Pitcairn Islanders to Norfolk Island. In April 1855, following diagreements about publication and allegations of financial irregularities, MacGillivray was dismissed from his post on the Herald. On 26 February 1857, Herald returned to Sydney.

Denham and Herald then made a survey of Port Jackson, which was completed in November 1857. This included a large-scale plan of Cockatoo Island. Herald was the first sailing ship to enter the Fitzroy Dock, on Cockatoo Island. Herald then surveyed the southern and western coasts of Australia as far as Shark Bay, returning to Sydney on 29 June 1858. On 3 September, they set sail for the Coral Sea, an area with many reefs most of which had not been charted accurately. The survey of the Coral sea would involve three cruises, and continue until May 1860. The result was to greatly improve the safety of the outer approach to the Torres Strait, to the east of the Great Barrier Reef.

In 1859, Herald erected the first beacon on Mellish Reef and Cay, using wreckage from the French aviso ‘Duroc’, which had wrecked on the reef in 1857.

Herald left Sydney on 17 August 1860 to chart reefs and take deep-sea soundings in preparation for telegraphic cable-laying. Surabaya was reached on 20 November, and Spithead in England on 16 May 1861, and was decommissioned on 1 July, nine years after setting out.

There was no published contemporary account of the voyage. David (1995) gives a very detailed account of the voyage, and reproduces many of the drawings and paintings produced by James Glen Wilson.

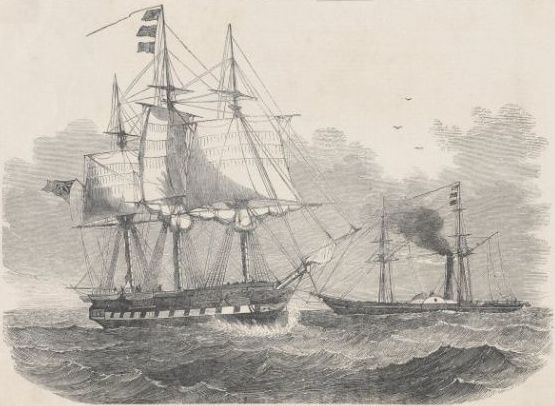
HMS Herald and steamship tender Torch, Expedition to the South Sea, Illustrated London News, 15 May 1852

Chart of St Paul Island from the Herald survey of 1853

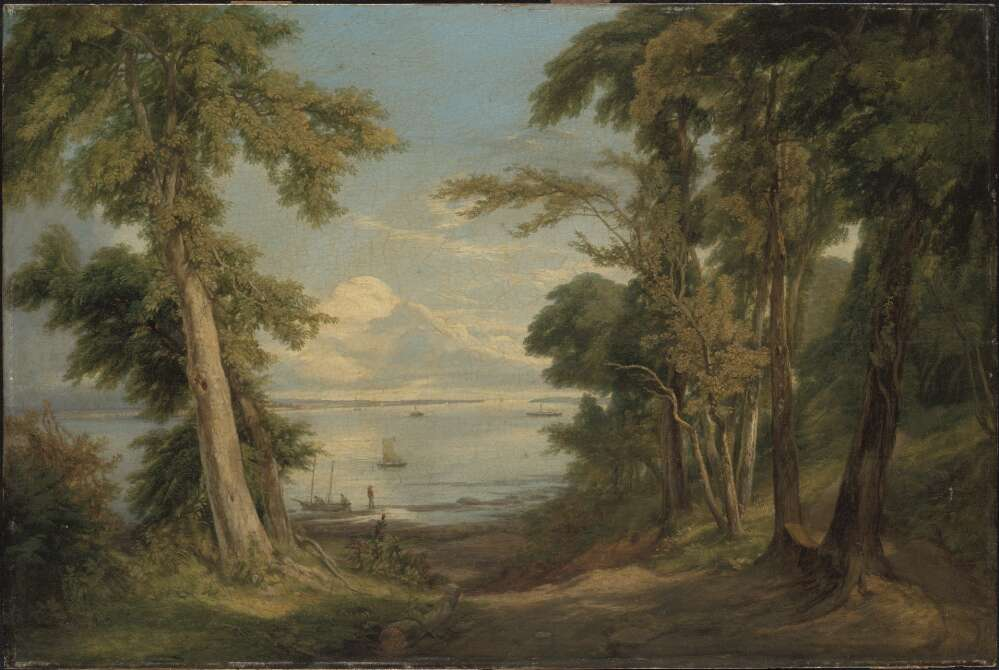
HMS Herald at the entrance to Botany Bay. Painting by J. Glen Wilson.

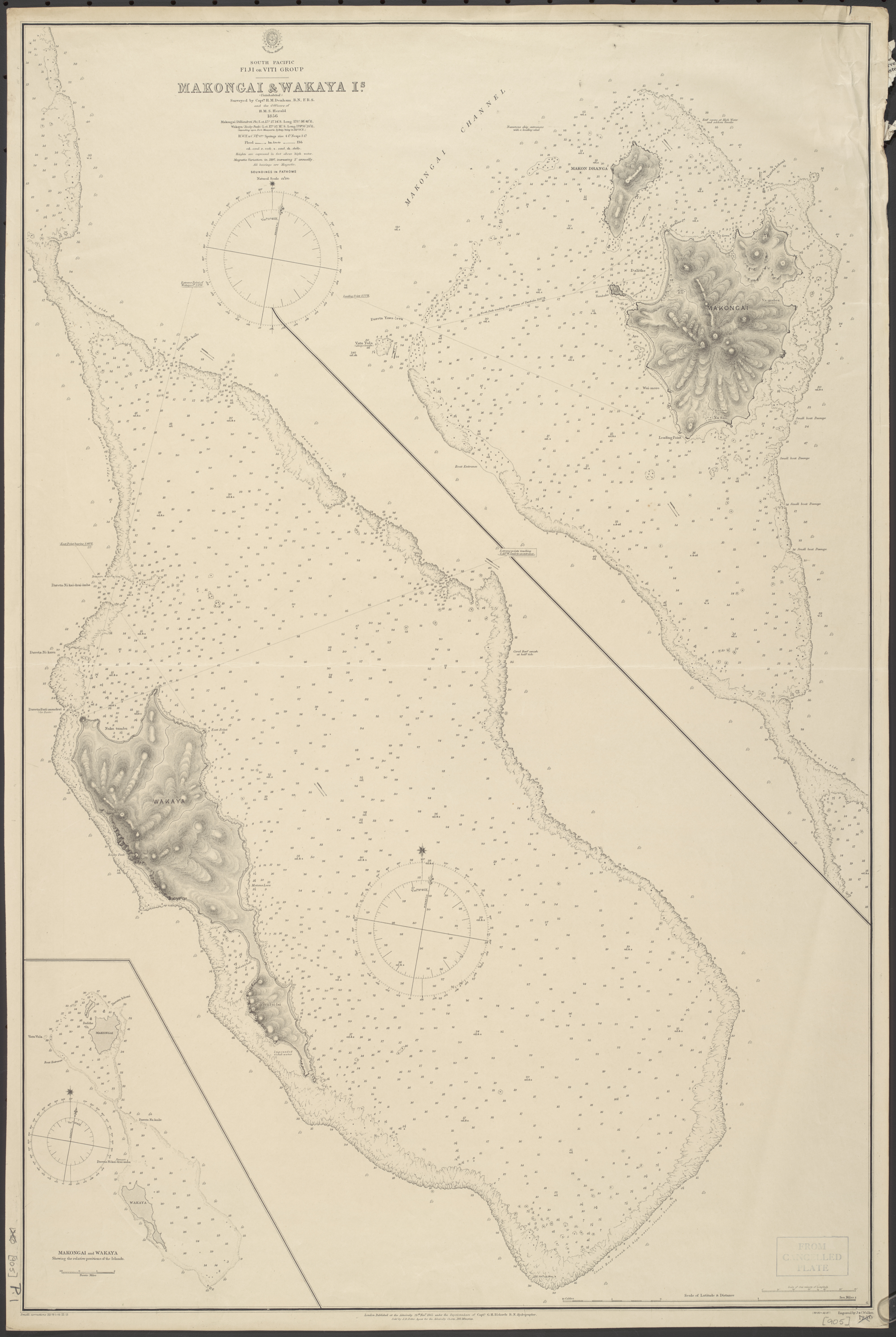
Chart of Makogai and Wakaya, two of the Fiji Islands surveyed by Denham in Herald

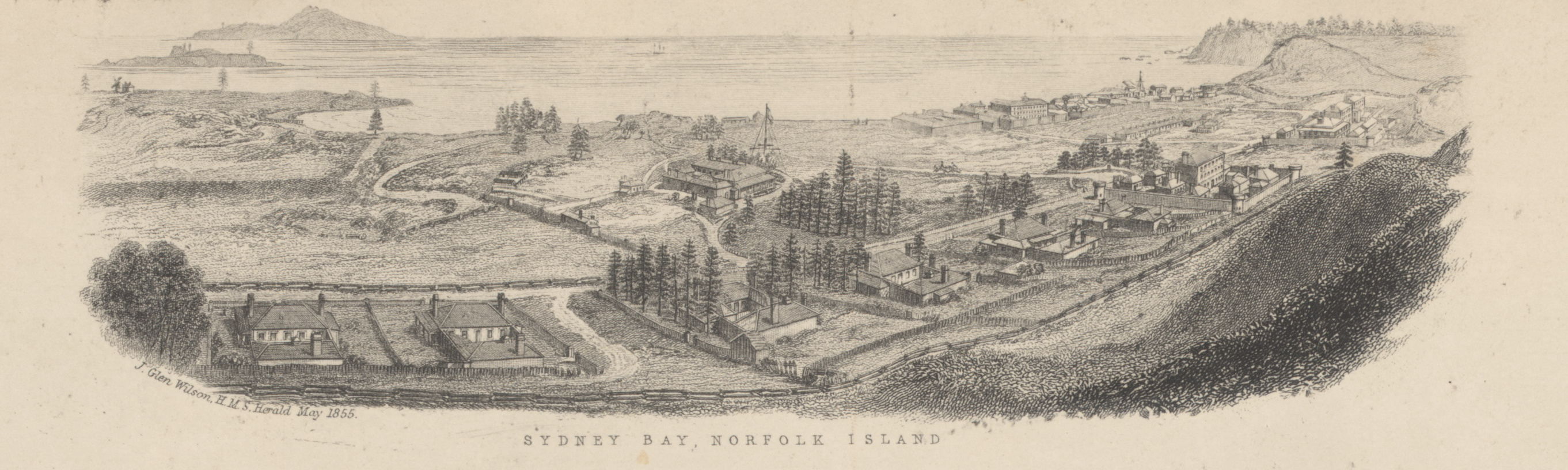
The Pitcairn Islanders' settlement on Norfolk Island. From a drawing by J. Glen Wilson.

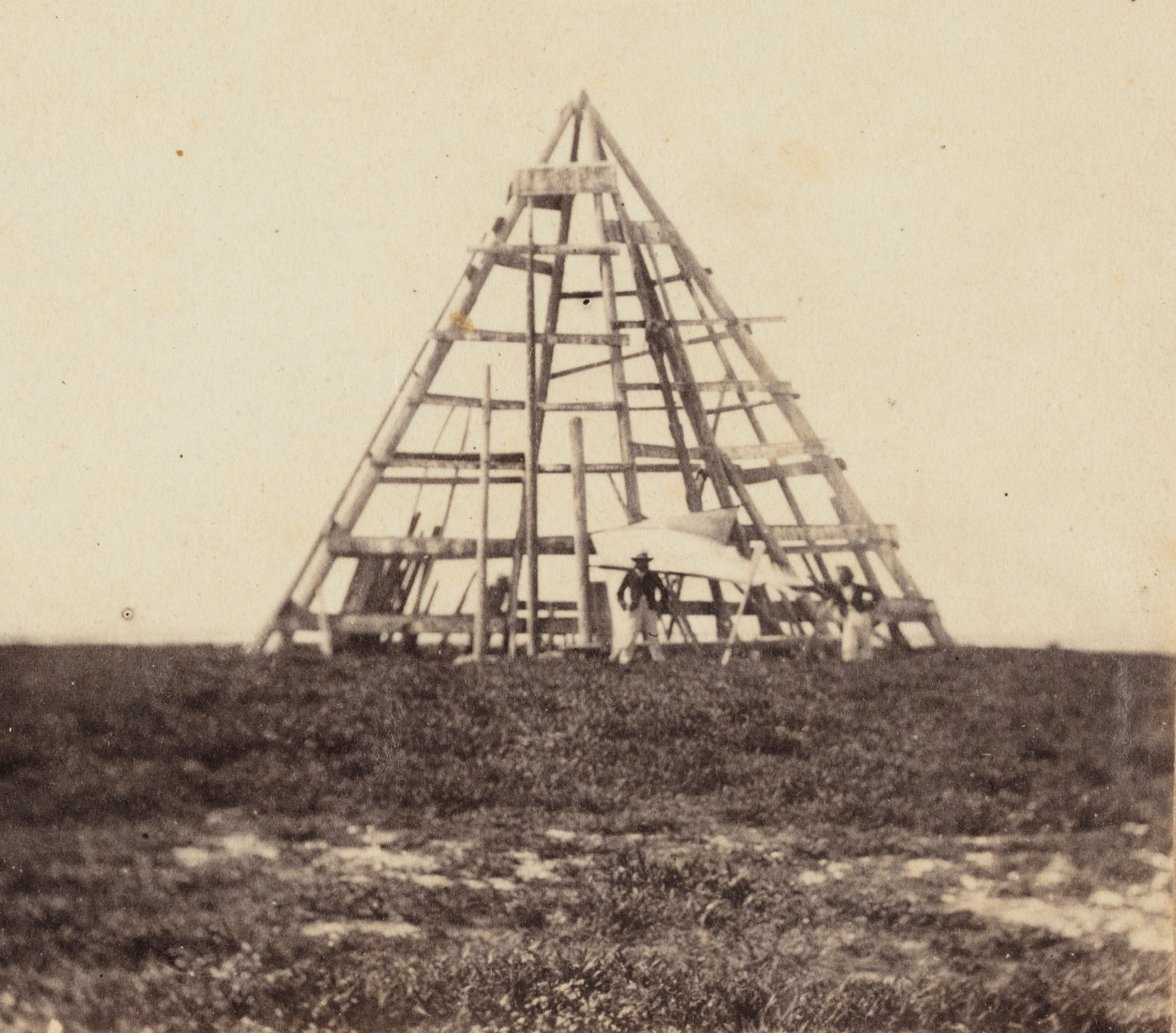

Herald was converted to a chapel ship and was used as a floating church in Shoreham in September 1861. She was sold to Castle for breaking on 28 April 1862.

== See also ==
- European and American voyages of scientific exploration
