= Joseph Nias =

Royal Navy Admiral (1793–1879)

Admiral Sir Joseph Nias KCB
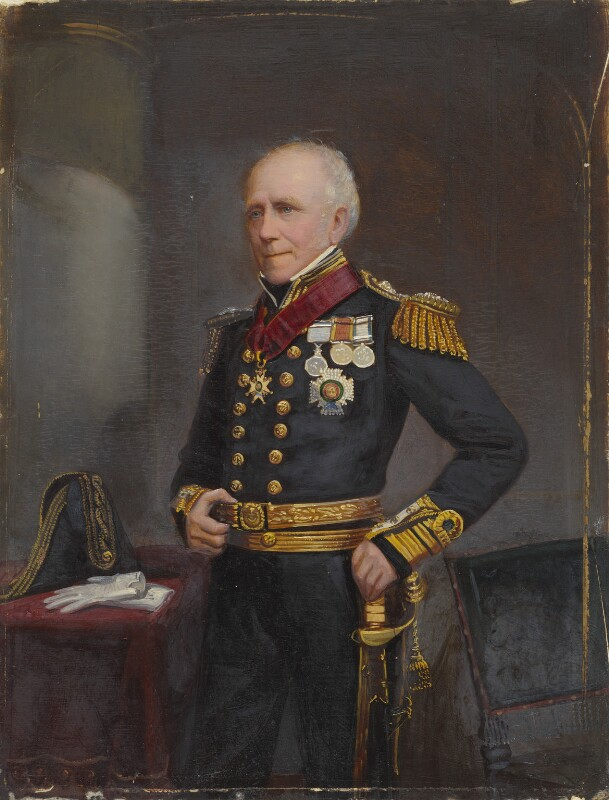
- Born: 2 April 1793; London
- Died: 17 December 1879 (aged 86); London
- Burial place: Marylebone cemetery, East Finchley, London
- Spouse: Caroline Isabella Laing (m. 1855)
- Children: 5
- Military career
- Allegiance: United Kingdom
- Branch: Royal Navy
- Service years: 1807–
- Rank: Admiral
- Served on: HMS Nautilus; HMS Comus; HMS Nymphen, 1814– HMS Ramillies, 1815; HMS Malta, 1815– HMS Rivoli, 1816– HMS Vengeur, 1817– HMS Queen Charlotte; Alexander, 1818– HMS Hecla, 1819–20; HMS Fury, 1821–23; HMS Asia, 1826– HMS Alacrity, 1827–30; HMS Herald, 1838–43; HMS Agincourt, 1850; HMS St George, 1850–53
- Commands: HMS Alacrity, 1827–30; HMS Herald, 1838–43; HMS St George, 1850–53
- Conflicts: First Opium War
- Awards: Knight Commander of the Most Honourable Order of the Bath, 1867; Companion of the Most Honourable Order of the Bath, 1841; China War Medal (1842); Naval General Service Medal (1847) with clasp Arctic Medal (1857)

Sir Joseph Nias KCB (2 April 1793 – 17 December 1879) was a British Royal Navy admiral.

== Biography ==
Nias was third son of Joseph Nias, ship insurance broker. He was born in London on 2 April 1793. He entered the navy in 1807, on board the sloop HMS Nautilus, under the command of Captain Matthew Smith, with whom he continued in HM frigates Comus and Nymphen, on the Lisbon, Mediterranean, North Sea, and Channel stations till August 1815. During the last few weeks of the Nymphen's commission, Nias, in command of one of her boats, was employed in rowing guard round HMS Bellerophon in Plymouth Sound, keeping off the sightseers who thronged to catch a glimpse of Napoleon. He continued in active service after the peace, and in January 1818 was appointed to the brig Alexander, with Lieutenant William Edward Parry, for an expedition to the Arctic under the command of Sir John Ross. In February 1819 he was again with Parry in HMS Hecla, returning to the Thames in November 1820, and on 26 December he was promoted to the rank of lieutenant. In January 1821 he was again appointed to the Hecla with Parry, and sailed for the Arctic in May. After two winters in the ice the Hecla returned to England in November 1823. In 1826 Nias went out to the Mediterranean as first lieutenant of HMS Asia, carrying the flag of Sir Edward Codrington, and, after the battle of Navarino, was promoted to be commander on 11 November 1827, and appointed to the brig HMS Alacrity, in which he saw some sharp service against the Greek pirates who at that time infested the Archipelago, and especially on 11 January 1829, in cutting out one commanded by a noted ruffian named Georgios, who was sent to Malta and duly hanged. The Alacrity was paid off in 1830.

Nias was advanced to post rank on 8 July 1835, and in May 1838 commissioned HMS Herald, frigate, for the East Indies, a station which at that time included Australia, China, and the Western Pacific. In February 1840, when Captain William Hobson of the navy was ordered to take possession of New Zealand in the name of the Queen, he went from Sydney as a passenger in the Herald, and was assisted by Nias in the formal proceedings

During the first Chinese war Nias was actively employed in the operations leading to the capture of Canton, and on 29 June 1841 he was nominated a C.B. The Herald returned to England in 1843, when Nias was placed on half pay. In June 1850 he commissioned to HMS Agincourt, from which in August he was moved to HMS St George, as flag-captain to Commodore Seymour, then superintendent of the dockyard at Devonport, and as captain of the ordinary. In 1852 Captain James Scott of the navy, in conversation with a friend at the United Service Club, made some reflections on Nias's conduct in China. Though duelling was then not quite extinct, the feeling of the navy was strongly opposed to it, and Nias took the then unusual practice of bringing an action against Scott, who, after the evidence of Sir Thomas Herbert and others, withdrew the imputation, and under pressure from the lord chief justice expressed his regret, on which the plaintiff accepted a verdict of 40s. and costs.

Nias commanded the ordinary at Devonport for the usual term of three years, and from 1854 to 1856 was superintendent of the victualling yard and hospital at Plymouth. He had no further service, but was made Rear-Admiral of the Blue on 14 February 1857, Rear-Admiral of the White, Rear-Admiral of the Red on 21 January 1862, Vice-Admiral of the Blue on 12 September 1863, K.C.B. on 13 March 1867, and Admiral on 18 October 1867. After his retirement from active service he resided for the most part at Surbiton, but in 1877 moved to London, where he died on 17 December 1879. He was buried in the Marylebone cemetery at East Finchley. He had married Caroline Isabella, only daughter of John Laing, in 1855, and left issue of two sons and three daughters.
