= HMS St George (1840) =

Ship of the line of the Royal Navy

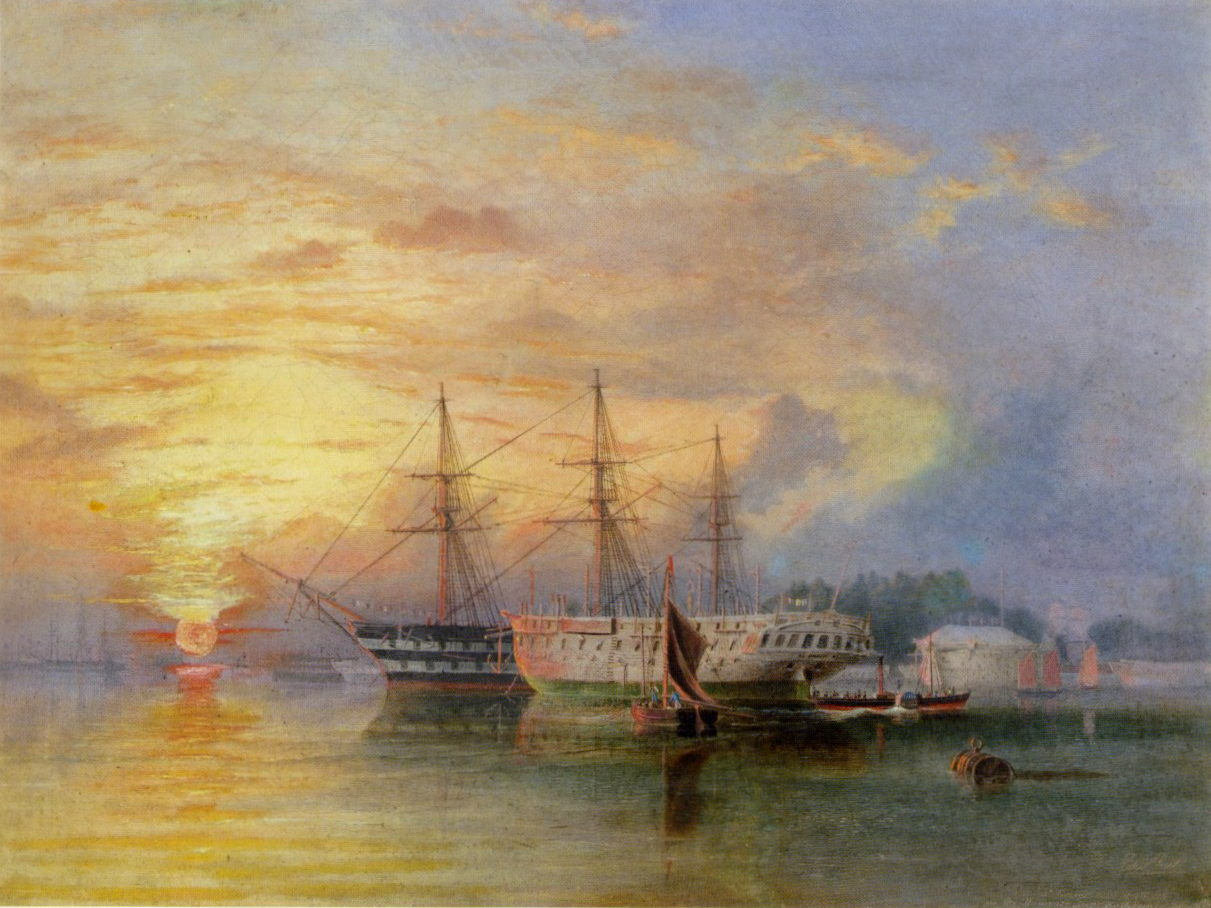
- St George and Arethusa on the Hamoaze near Bull Point, 1860, by Edward Snell

History

United Kingdom
- Name: St George
- Ordered: 2 June 1819
- Builder: Devonport Dockyard
- Laid down: May 1827
- Launched: 27 August 1840
- Commissioned: 31 August 1850
- Fate: Sold for scrap, November 1883

General characteristics (as built)
- Class & type: Broadened Caledonia-class ship of the line
- Tons burthen: 2,719 26/94 bm
- Length: 205 ft 6 in (62.6 m) (gun deck)
- Beam: 55 ft 3 in (16.8 m)
- Draught: 18 ft 1 in (5.5 m)
- Depth of hold: 23 ft 3 in (7.1 m)
- Propulsion: Sails
- Sail plan: Full-rigged ship
- Complement: 900 (wartime)
- Armament: 120 muzzle-loading, smoothbore guns: Gun deck: 30 × 32 pdrs, 2 × 68 pdr carronades; Middle gun deck: 32 × 32 pdrs, 2 × 68 pdr carronades; Upper gun deck: 32 × 32 pdrs, 2 × 68 pdr carronades; Quarterdeck: 16 × 32 pdr carronades; Forecastle: 2 × 32 pdrs, 2 × 32 pdr carronades

General characteristics (after conversion)
- Displacement: 4,213 long tons (4,281 t)
- Tons burthen: 2,864 (bm)
- Length: 216 ft 6 in (66 m) (gun deck)
- Installed power: Boilers; 1,730 ihp (1,290 kW)
- Propulsion: 1 shaft; 1 single-expansion steam engine
- Speed: 10.9 knots (20.2 km/h; 12.5 mph)
- Complement: 830
- Armament: 89 guns; Lower gun deck: 32 × 8 in (203 mm) shell guns; Upper gun deck: 34 × 32 pdr guns; Forecastle & Quarterdeck: 22 × 32 pdr guns + 1 × 68 pdr gun

HMS St George was a three-deck, 120-gun, first rate, broadened Caledonia-class ship of the line built for the Royal Navy (RN) during the 1830s. Completed in 1840, the ship remained in ordinary until 1854, although she began serving as a guard ship in 1850. St George was commissioned in 1854 to serve with the Baltic Fleet during the Crimean War of 1854–1856 with the Russian Empire. She was razeed and converted into a screw-powered, two-deck, 89-gun, second rate in 1858–1859. Recommissioned in 1860, the ship served as a flagship before she was transferred to the North America and West Indies Station in 1861. St George served with the Channel Squadron and then the Mediterranean Fleet in 1862–1864 and then again served as a guard ship from 1864 to 1869. The ship was sold for scrap in 1883.

== Description ==
The Caledonia class was an improved version of HMS Hibernia with additional freeboard to allow them to fight all their guns in heavy weather. The broadened sub-class had their beam increased to improve their stability. St George measured 205 feet 6 inches (62.6 m) on the gun deck and 170 feet 5 inches (51.9 m) on the keel. She had a beam of 55 feet 3 inches (16.8 m), a depth of hold of 23 feet 3 inches (7.1 m), a light draught of 18 feet 1 inch (5.51 m) and had a tonnage of 2,719 26/94 tons burthen. Her crew numbered 820 officers and ratings in peacetime and 900 in wartime. St George had three masts and was ship rigged.

The ship was armed with 120 muzzle-loading, smoothbore guns that consisted of thirty 32-pounder (56 cwt) guns (Note: "Cwt" is the abbreviation for hundredweight, 56 cwt referring to the weight of the gun.) and two 8 in (203 mm) shell guns on her lower gun deck, thirty-two 32-pounder (55 cwt) guns and two 8-inch shell guns on her middle gun deck and thirty-four 32-pounders on her upper gun deck. Her forecastle and quarterdeck carried a total of six 32-pounders and fourteen short 32-pounder guns between them.

=== Conversion ===
After the Crimean War, the naval arms race in screw-powered ships of the line between Britain and France resumed. In mid-1858 Captain Baldwin Wake Walker, Surveyor of the Navy, estimated that Britain would have 36 battleships to France's 40 by the end of 1859. He persuaded the Admiralty to authorize the cutting down and conversion of the 120-gun first rates of the Caledonia and Nelson classes into steam-powered second rates based on the successful conversion of the second rate London. St George was ordered to be converted in mid-1858. She was lengthened at the stern to 216 feet 6 inches (66 m) at the gun deck and 178 feet 11 inches (54.5 m) at the keel. These changes modestly increased her tons burthen to 2,864 and gave her a displacement of 4,213 long tons (4,281 t). The ship was fitted with a two-cylinder single-expansion steam engine of 500-nominal horsepower that was built by Ravenhill, Selkeld & Co. that gave the ship a speed of 10.9 knots (20.2 km/h; 12.5 mph) during her sea trials on 8 August 1859 from 1,730 indicated horsepower (1,290 kW). To reduce drag and improve performance under sail, the ship could hoist her propeller into the hull and retract the telescoping funnel.

The lower gun deck armament of the converted ships consisted of thirty-two 8-inch shell guns while the upper gun deck had thirty-four 32-pounders of 56 cwt. The combined armament of the forecastle and quarterdeck totalled twenty-two 32-pounders (42 cwt) and a single 68-pounder (95 cwt) pivot gun.

== Construction and career ==
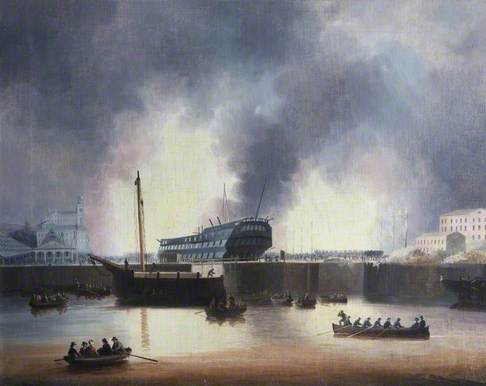
The fire on the morning of 27 September 1840 which threatened to destroy the dockyard. St George (pictured) was far enough away from the blazing Talavera to escape destruction.

Named after the patron saint of England, St George was the sixth ship of her name to serve in the RN. The ship was ordered on 2 June 1819, laid down at Devonport Dockyard in May 1827, launched on 27 August 1840 and immediately placed in ordinary. She was refitted as an "Advanced ship" from January 1843 to October 1845 so she could be activated more quickly, which meant that all of her guns were aboard and more of her masts were fitted; the rest of her rigging and stores were in a designated warehouse. While in the dockyard and before being put to sea she was at risk of destruction. The dockyard suffered severe damage in a large scale fire on 25 September 1840; it started in the North Dock on the 74-gun third rate HMS Talavera which was destroyed. The frigate Imogene was completely gutted, the fire threatened the third rate Minden, and spread to nearby buildings and equipment. Estimates for the damage were put at £150,000 in the values of the day, and would have totalled £500,000 had the fire not been contained by demolishing several surrounding buildings. St George was completed in July 1850 as a guard ship and she was commissioned on 31 August by Captain Joseph Nias at Devonport when she became the flagship of Commodore Lord John Hay. Commodore Michael Seymour replaced Hay on 8 September 1851. Captain John Kingcome relieved Nias on 23 May 1853.

The decisive Russian victory in the Battle of Sinop over the Ottoman Navy on 30 November alarmed politicians in both Britain and France. They decided to intervene on the side of the Ottomans and the British began forming a Baltic Fleet in February 1854 in anticipation of war. The Russians did not withdraw their forces in the Balkans as demanded by the British and French governments on 27 February and declarations of war by both governments followed a month later. Admiral Sir Charles Napier, commander-in-chief of the Baltic Fleet, was charged to blockade the exit from the Baltic Sea and all of the Russian ports therein.

Kingcome was replaced in his turn by Captain Harry Eyres on 6 February 1854. St George was present when the French contribution to the Baltic Fleet rendezvoused with the British on 13 June. The ship is not known to have participated in any of the minor actions in 1854 and she did not return to the Baltic in 1855 as she was only awarded the Baltic 1854 battle honour. The ship was paid off on 5 April 1856 at Devonport.

Walker ordered that the ship be cut down one deck and converted to screw propulsion on 10 August 1858 and work began 11 days later. She was undocked on 19 March 1859 and completed on 12 July. St George was commissioned by Captain Francis Egerton on 6 June as the flagship of Rear-Admiral Edmund Lyons. The ship was transferred to the North America and West Indies Station in May 1861, to the Channel Squadron the following May and then to the Mediterranean Fleet in November 1862. She was paid off on 9 February 1864. St George was recommissioned the following day by Captain Sydney Grenfell to serve as the guard ship at Falmouth. He was relieved in his turn by Captain Edward Rice on 5 May and the ship was transferred to Portland Harbour in May 1865. Captain Mathew Nolloth replaced Rice on 1 May 1867 and she participated in the cruise of the Reserve Fleet later that month. St George was paid off on 30 June 1869 and was sold to Henry Castle & Sons in November 1883 to be scrapped at Charlton, London.
