= John Denis Macdonald =

Irish surgeon and zoologist

Sir John Denis Macdonald KCB FRS
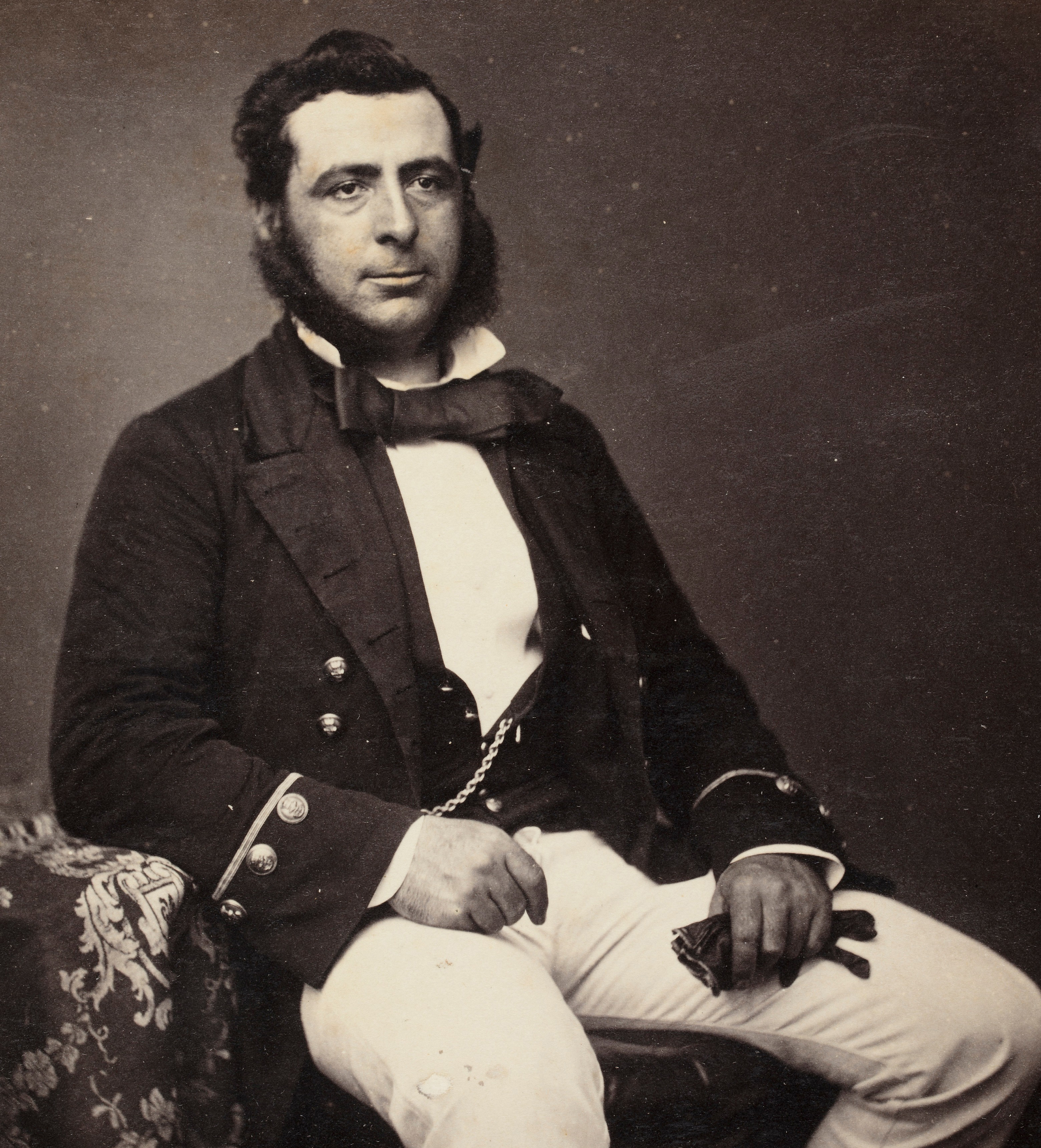
- John Denis Macdonald, Officer HMS Herald, ca. 1859, photographer unknown
- Born: County Cork, Ireland
- Died: Southall, Middlesex
- Alma mater: King's College London, University of St. Andrews
- Children: William Richard Macdonald
- Military career
- Allegiance: British
- Branch: Royal Navy
- Rank: Surgeon General
- Awards: Fellow of the Royal Society, Knight Commander of the Order of the Bath

Inspector-General of Hospitals and Fleets Sir John Denis Macdonald KCB FRS (26 October 1826 – 7 February 1908) was a naval surgeon.

== Navy career ==
He was born in Cork, County Cork, Ireland, the son of James Macdonald, an artist, art critic and one of the claimants of the Annandale Peerage. Upon the death of the last legitimate heir of the MacDonald's of Castleton, Isle of Skye, Scotland, James Macdonald inherited that title, as the nearest surviving legitimate male kin. John was educated at Cork school of medicine and King's College, London, where he was awarded M.R.C.S.Eng in 1849. He later was awarded M.D. from the University of St. Andrews.

Macdonald joined the Royal Navy as an assistant surgeon and initially served at the Royal Hospital, Plymouth. In 1852 he was appointed to the survey ship HMS Herald. As a result of his studies, principally with the microscope, on the seabed deposits brought up by the dredger he was awarded in 1862 the Makdougall-Brisbane prize by the Royal Society of Edinburgh and elected a member of the Royal Society in 1859 (his membership was proposed by Joseph Toynbee, Edwin Lankester, Francis Sibson, Richard Owen and Richard Partridge among others).

In 1864, by now promoted to surgeon, he was appointed to the Royal Hospital Haslar in Gosport, Hampshire and in June 1870 was made staff surgeon to HMS Lord Warden, flagship in the Mediterranean. In March 1872 he was appointed to the flagship at Portsmouth for service as professor of naval hygiene at the Army Medical School at Netley, a post he continued to hold after his promotion to Deputy Inspector-General of Hospitals and Fleets in February 1875. In July 1880 he was promoted Inspector-General, and put in charge of the Royal Naval Hospital at Plymouth from 1883 to 1886. He retired in 1886.

Following the succession of King Edward VII, he was among several retired navy officers appointed Knight Commander of the Order of the Bath in the 1902 Coronation Honours list published on 26 June 1902, the investiture was on board the royal yacht Victoria and Albert outside Cowes on 15 August 1902, the day before the fleet review held there to mark the coronation.

In later life he researched in the fields of zoology and natural history.

He died in Southall, Middlesex in 1908.

== Family ==
Macdonald was married twice; firstly in 1863 to Sarah Phoebe (d. 1875), daughter of Ely Walker of Stainland, Yorkshire, by whom he had three sons; James Alexander Walker (who died in infancy); John Denis; William Richard, and two daughter; Elyna Mary and Catherine Janet. He was later married to Erina, daughter of Rev. William Archer, prebendary of Limerick.
