= Charles Townsend Gedye =

19th-century Australian shipping magnate

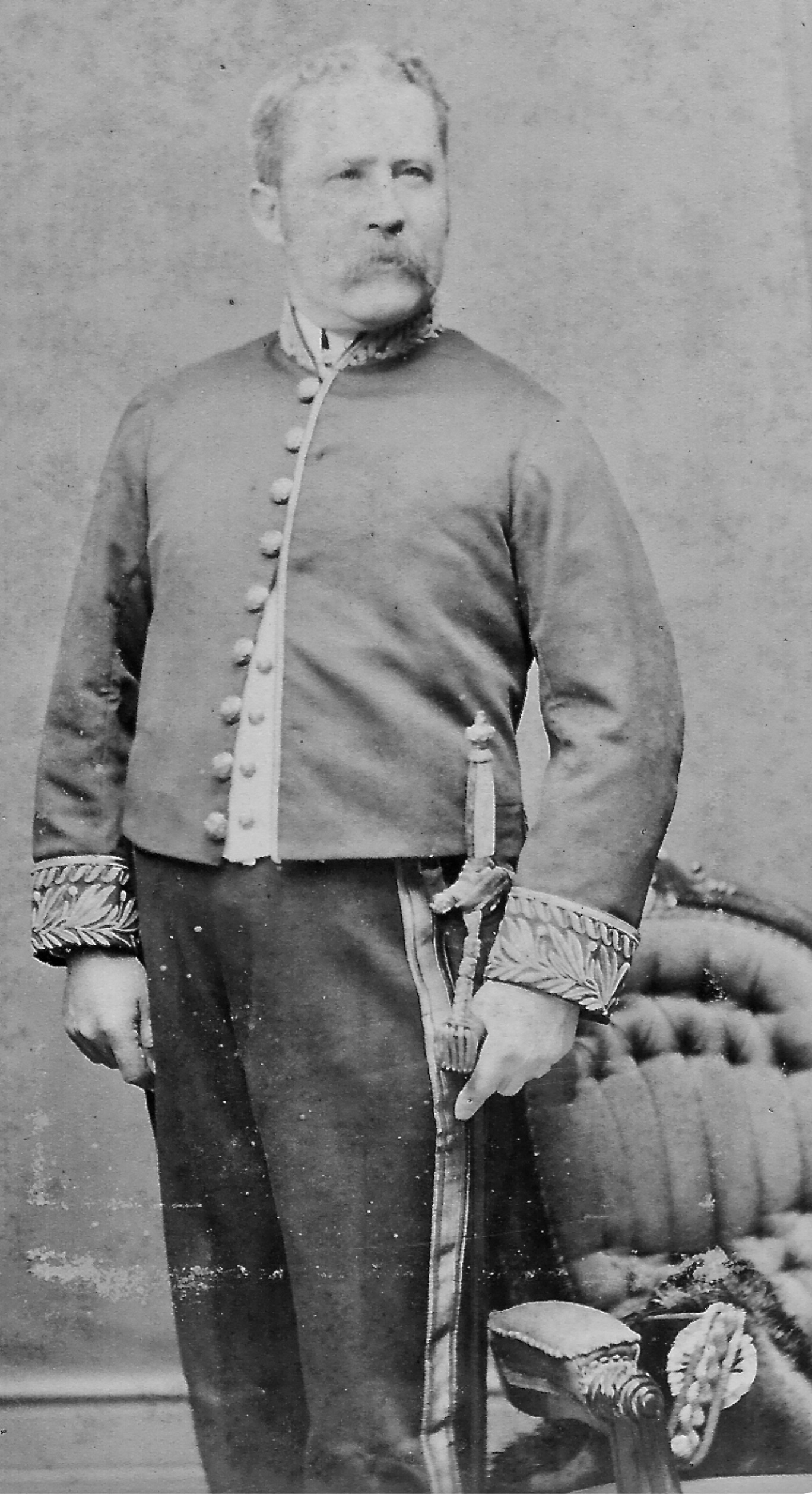
- Charles Townsend Gedye, in the uniform of Consul to Norway and Sweden, circa 1883
- Born: Charles Townsend Gedye; 19 November 1833; Devonport, Plymouth, Devon
- Died: 6 December 1900 (aged 67); 17, Craven Hill Gardens
- Occupation: 19th century entrepreneurial business man
- Spouses: Mary Harriet Wintle (m. 1853; died 1876); Grace Clifford Murnin (m. 1880)
- Children: 3 daughters
- Parent(s): Charles Michael Gedye and Alice née Townsend

Charles Townsend Gedye (1833–1900) was a Victorian entrepreneur of Cornish descent who is best known as a shipping grandee in colonial Australia, co-owner and founder of the centenarian Dangar, Gedye & Co.

== Life and Works ==
Charles Townsend Gedye was born in Devonport in 1833, the only surviving son of Charles Michael Gedye and Alice Townsend both from St Neot, Cornwall. At the age of 14, he accompanied his father on a mail ship (Louisa) for a new life in Australia. On arrival, Gedye's father was engaged as manager at a meat canning factory in Newcastle, while Gedye trained in book keeping and clerical work in support of his father.

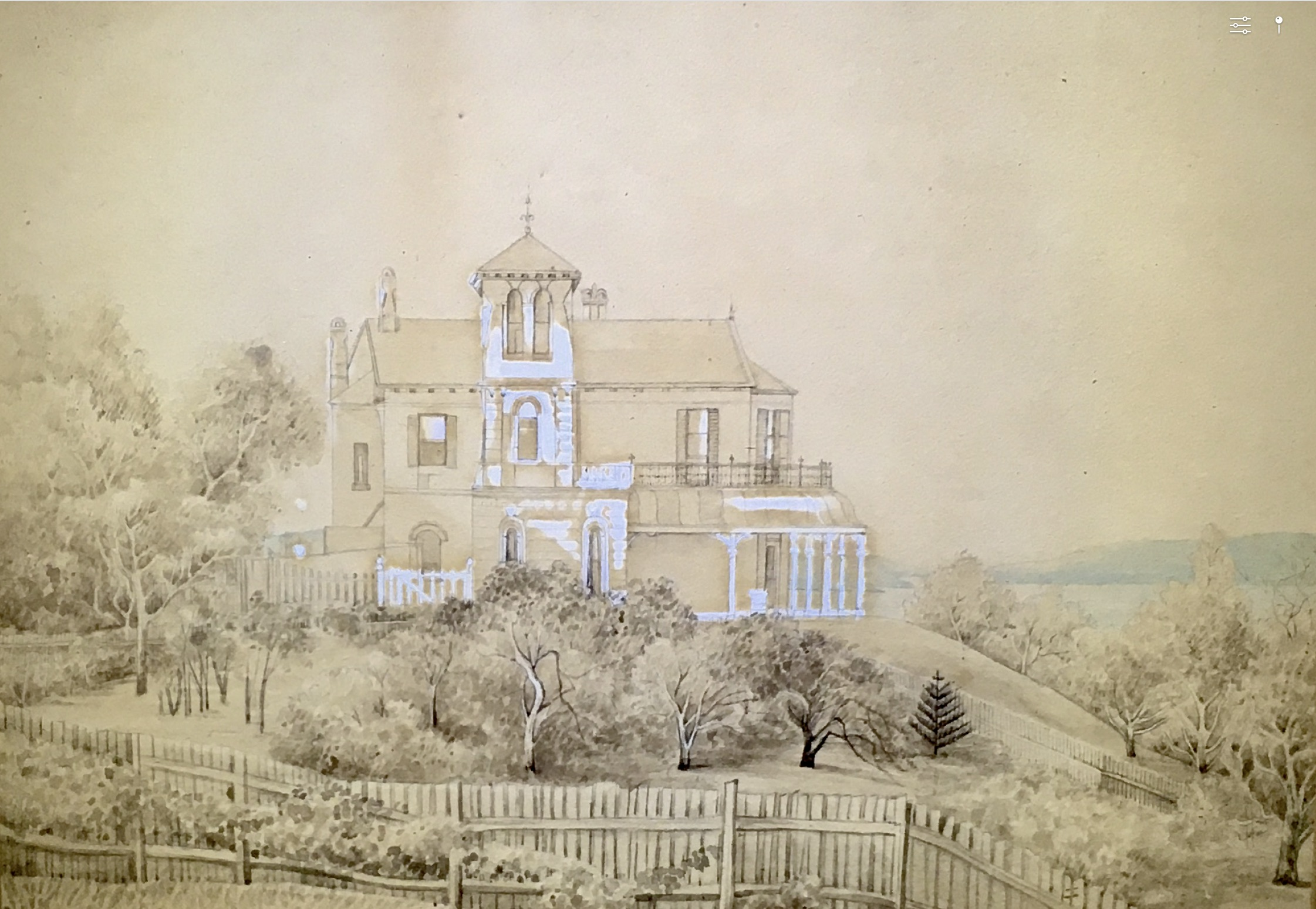
The Gedye family home "Eastbourne" Darling Point, New South Wales, circa 1862 (attributed to Mary Gedye)

Gedye had a natural aptitude for numbers with an eye for detail, and in 1850 father and son went in to partnership. It was not long before Gedye took over as principal of the company from his father and moved his operations to Sydney. In 1853, Gedye married Mary Harriet Wintle, a celebrated Tasmanian watercolourist. For the next few years, Gedye moved with his growing family between Sydney and Newcastle, operating independently as a consultant auditor for the local government as well as various Sydney businesses.

=== Shipping ===
In 1866, Gedye collaborated with Frederick Holkham Dangar to invest in fast ocean-going clippers, and two years later, they part-owned their first vessel, South Australian. Both men scoured shipyards from Britain to San Francisco, handing over responsibility for their business interests to each other in their absence. In 1868, they part underwrote a second vessel, Hawkesbury, whose maiden voyage to Sydney was completed in 1869 and continued with the partnership in the Sydney-London trade until it was sold in 1889.

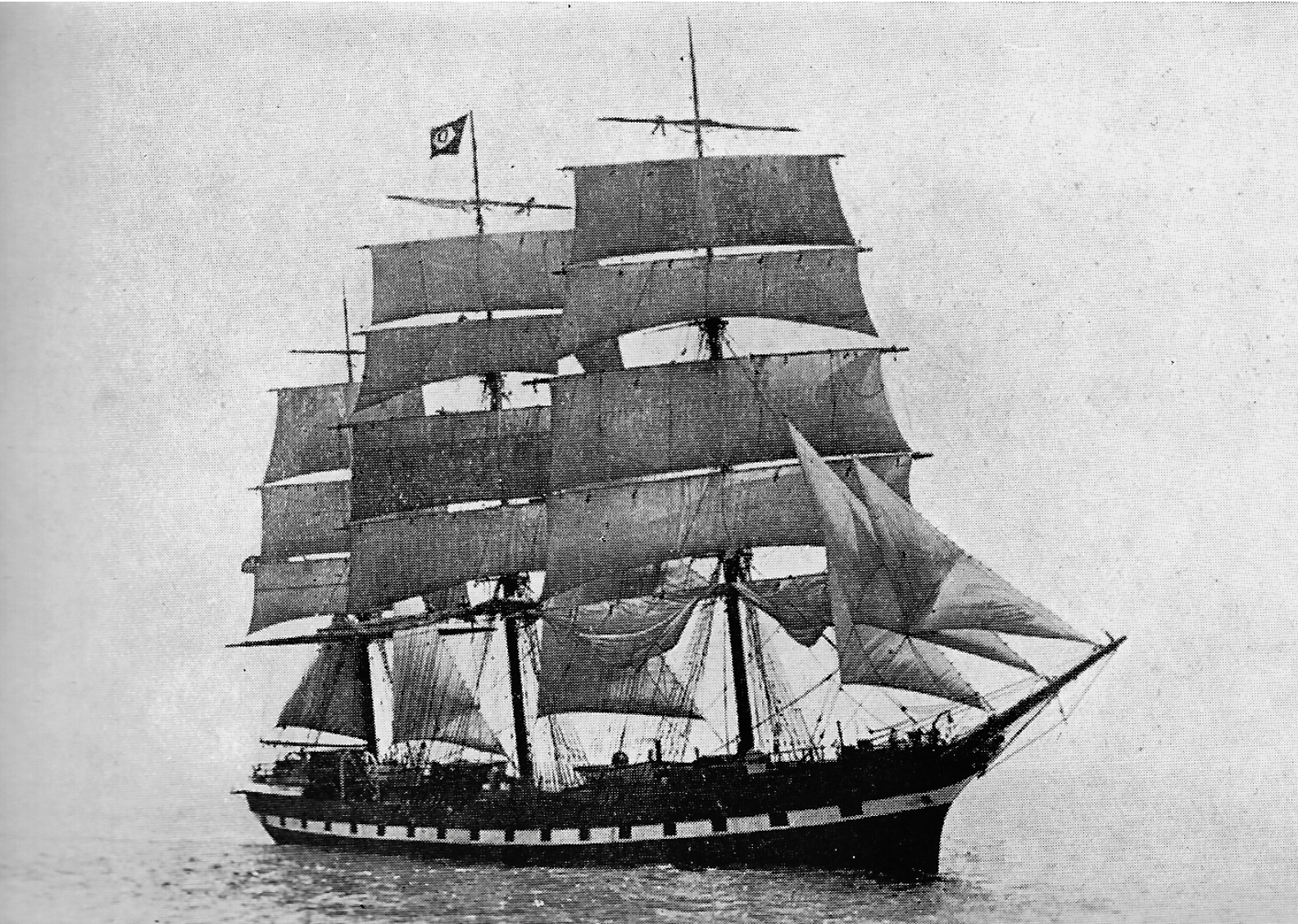
Neotsfield under full sail, flying the Dangar, Gedye flag circa 1900

The partnership itself was only formalised in 1870 with the creation of Dangar, Gedye & Co. The mainstay of their business was as commissioning agents for their own export/import freight, signing up many of the finest clippers of their day including the legendary Cutty Sark, which ran for the partners from 1885 to 1893, the period of her most sensational performances. Cutty Sark was arguably the most glamorous of the ships run by the partners, but they also commissioned many other notable racing clippers, including Tweed, Hallowe’en and Brilliant.

The first wholly owned Dangar, Gedye & Co ship was the Peruvian Francisco Calderón, purchased in 1879. The Francisco was a coolie slave steamship which was stripped, re-fitted for sail and re-named Gladstone in homage to the then Prime Minister of Britain, a close friend of Dangar's. The second company clipper was launched in 1889, named Neotsfield.

=== Legacy ===
Gedye’s involvement in shipping raised his profile from merchant to business leader in a few short years. In 1870, he was commissioned as a Justice of the Peace in Sydney, mostly serving with the Water Police Courts. Shortly after, Gedye started appearing in a variety of directorships for mining companies from Gold to Copper to Oil Shale, and electricity, as well as serving as auditor for the Chambers of Commerce and sitting on the boards of a number of financial institutions. Gedye was admitted as a fellow to the Royal Society of New South Wales in 1877 and in 1882, he was honoured with the office of Consul for the United Kingdoms of Sweden and Norway in New South Wales. He served in this position between 27 June 1882 and 30 September 1887. Gedye had become a respected leader in Sydney, seen as a safe pair of hands by the colonial administration of the time, honoured by a grateful monarch.

Gedye died at his home in London in 1900. The company bore his name for more than a century until it ceased trading in 1976.

== Bibliography ==
A.D. Fraser (Ed.) - 1938, "THIS CENTURY OF OURS, Being an Account of the Origin and History during One Hundred Years of the House of Dangar, Gedye & Malloch Ltd, of Sydney.", published Halstead Press Pty Ltd, Sydney, 2012
