= Mary Gedye =

19th Century Australian watercolourist

Mary Harriet Gedye
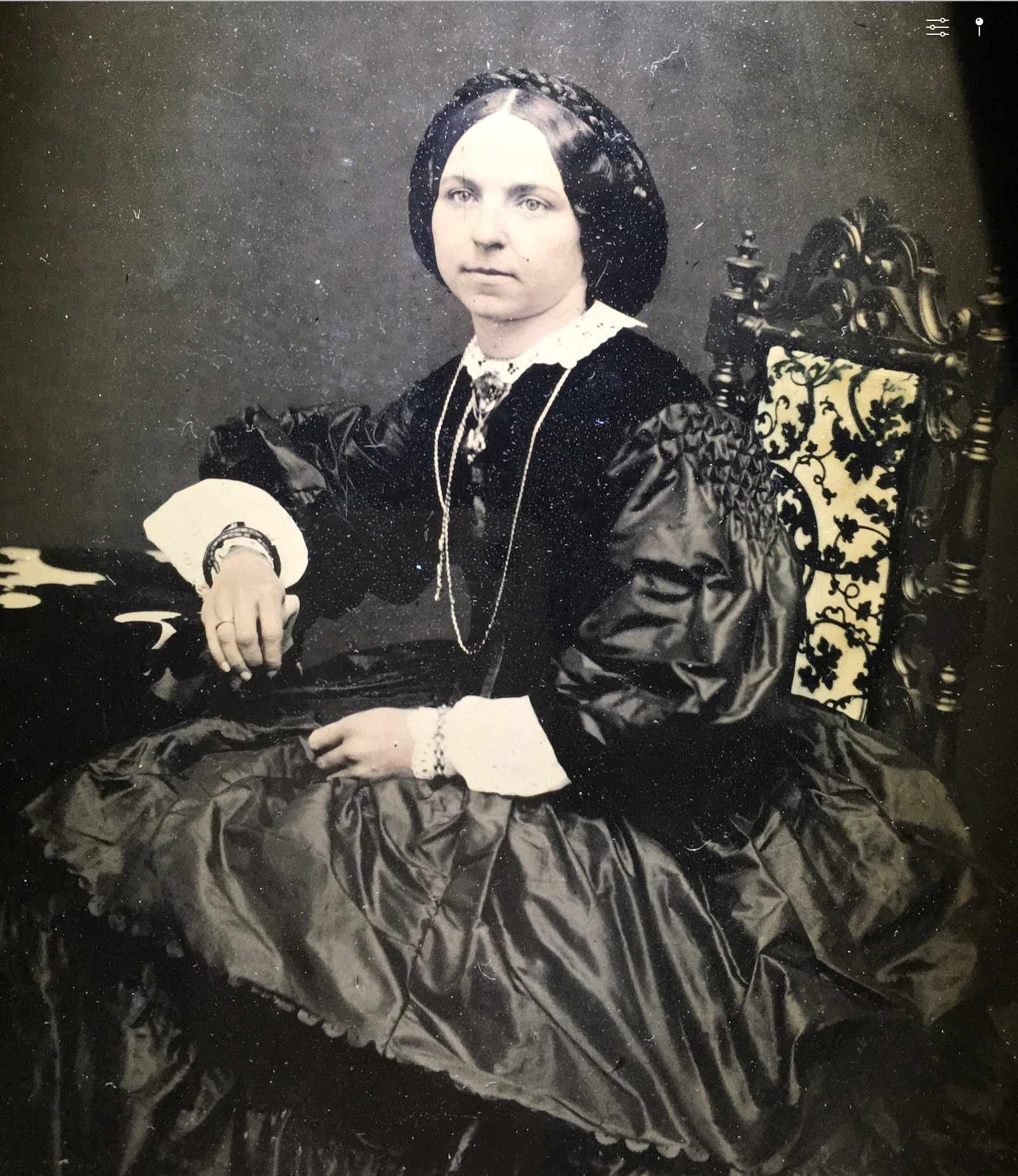
- Mary Gedye, hand-coloured Daguerreotype ca. 1865, Eastbourne, Sydney
- Born: Mary Harriet Wintle; 23 Feb 1832; Hobart, Van Diemen's Land
- Died: 31 January 1876 (aged 41–42) "Eastbourne"
- Known for: Watercolourist
- Spouse: Charles Townsend Gedye
- Children: 3 daughters
- Awards: Sydney Intercolonial Exhibition 1870, New South Wales Academy of Art 1872

Mary Harriet Gedye (1832–1876) was an Australian watercolourist.

== Life and works ==
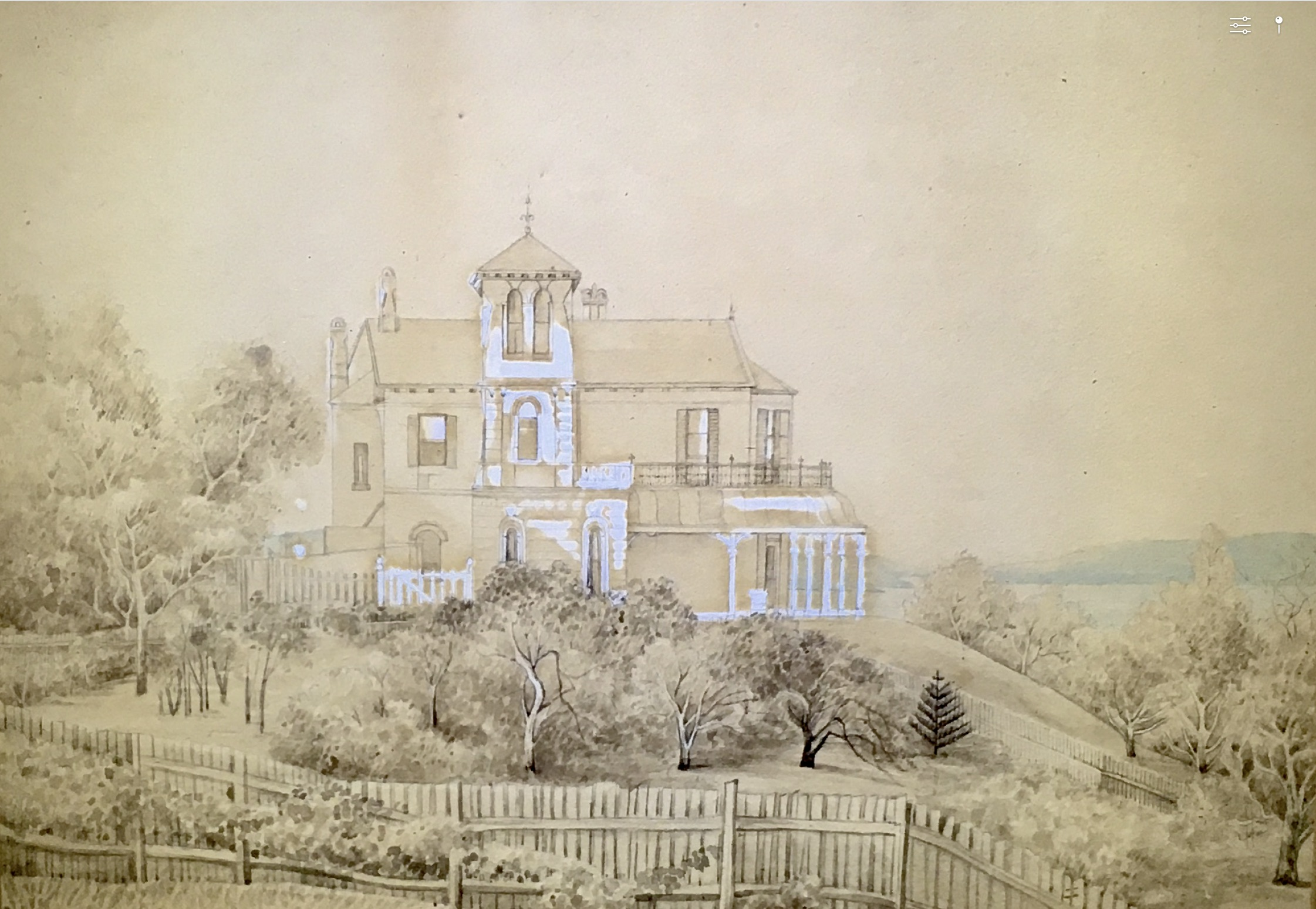
The Gedye family home "Eastbourne" Darling Point, New South Wales, circa 1862 (attributed to Mary Gedye)

Mary Harriet Gedye was born in Hobart, Tasmania in 1832, the second daughter of Samuel James Wintle and Mary Anne, née Magill. In 1839 she accompanied her parents to Sydney where, reputedly aged seven, she began drawing lessons with 'a French lady artist, Madame Romansson – according to her obituary – then with Conrad Martens (according to family tradition). In 1852, she was awarded a gold medal for water colour painting at the Paris exhibition of that year. The following year, Mary Harriet Wintle married Charles T. Gedye of Eastbourne, Darling Point, Sydney.

Her marriage to Gedye "placed her in easy circumstance", allowing her to focus on her art as well as giving birth to three daughters. Her first daughter was born in May 1954 and a few months later, she is thought to have painted a Tasmanian subject but her best known works were View at Currajong, another at Waterboard Waterfalls and a view of Port Jackson from Eastbourne. A watercolour heightened with white and gum arabic of an Australian coastal scene dated 1861 was offered at Christie's Melbourne on 29 April 1997 (lot 55); while On the Lane Cove, another watercolour is dated December 1862 and is housed at the Mitchell Library, Sydney. In 1866, when the Gedyes were living at Lurlei, Woollahra, Mary Harriet showed View from Mount Bowen, South Kurrajong, New South Wales at the Sydney exhibition preceding the Paris Universal Exhibition. Conrad Martens and F.C. Terry were awarded the prizes of £30 and £20 respectively, but the secretary to the commissioners wrote to Mrs Gedye 'to convey to you the very high opinion generally entertained by them of your water-colour painting...[and] the Commissioners regret their inability to testify their appreciation more substantially than by mere words’. The landscape was exhibited in Paris the following year. In 1870 she contributed The Gap, Kurrajong to the Sydney Intercolonial Exhibition, which was awarded a bronze medal. A number of her works, mainly views of the Blue Mountains, were lent to this exhibition by her husband. She exhibited with the New South Wales Academy of Art in 1872 and was awarded a prize for Govett's Waterfall.

Gedye's legacy of artwork is dominated by studies of the mountain scenery of 19th Century of New South Wales. She told her brother that she intended to visit Tasmania again to satisfy a long-held desire to paint some of "its unrivalled scenery", but she died of a stroke at her home in Sydney on 31 January 1876, before she could make the attempt. The Hobart Town Mercury published an obituary that drew attention to her Tasmanian origins, gave an account of her career and commented: 'The colonial art world suffers a serious loss by her untimely death’.
