= HMS Torch (1845) =

Iron steamer ship of the Royal Navy

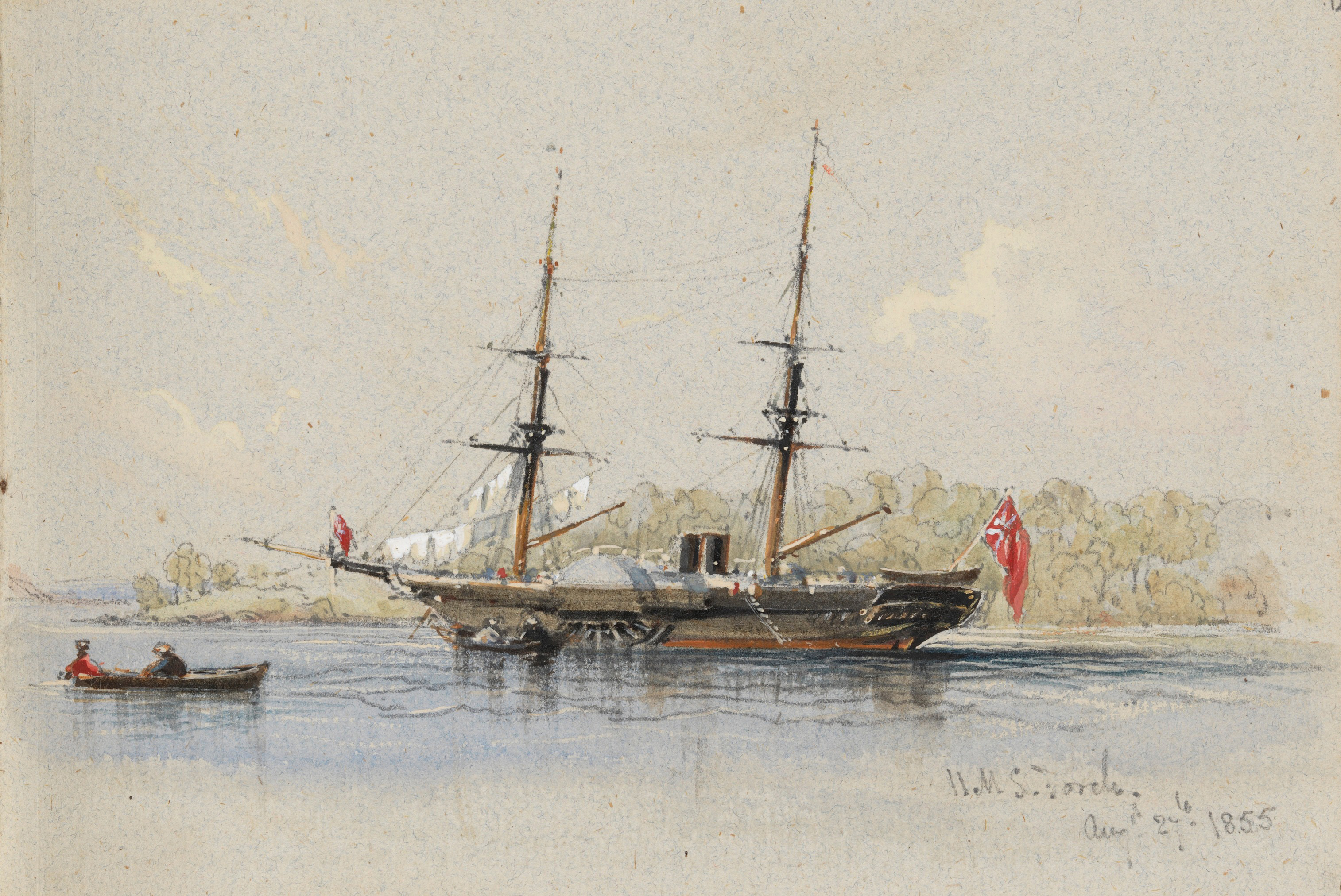
- HMS Torch, Sydney, 27 August 1855, watercolour sketch by Conrad Martens

History

United Kingdom
- Name: HMS Torch
- Launched: 25 February 1845
- Out of service: 1856
- Fate: Purchased by Dan Egan at Sydney auction in May 1856

General characteristics
- Type: paddle steamer
- Displacement: 350 tons (315,616 kilograms)
- Propulsion: 134 kilowatt steam engines
- Armament: 1 x 32 pound pivot gun

HMS Torch was an iron steamer of 350 tons which was the tender vessel for HMS Herald. In the 1850s she conducted surveying work in Australia and the Pacific.

== Service in Australian waters ==
On 18 May 1852, HMS Torch met HMS Herald at Margate to serve as her tender vessel. The following morning, she towed the Herald out of Margate Roads and they then anchored at Plymouth where the Torch was converted to a schooner to improve her sailing qualities. On 10 June 1852, they sailed from England on their voyage to work surveying in Australia and the Pacific under the command of Lieutenant William Chimmo. Soon after leaving England the Torch found it impossible to unship her paddles making sailing difficult and for most of the first leg to Madeira they were unable to travel together. To add to the confusion the two ships were separated in the Indian Ocean on 27 January 1853 with the Herald arriving in Sydney months before the tender vessel. HMS Torch finally made it to Sydney on 7 April 1853 after many had written her off as being lost at sea.

As a government vessel, she supplied coal and did surveying work in conjunction with HMS Herald as well as being commissioned to undertake specific tasks for the New South Wales Government. Being low in the water she was mounted with a long 32 pound pivot gun and nets around the sides of the vessel to ward off any pirates trying to board the ship.

19 April 1854, HMS Torch left on a cruise of the Pacific. Her first stop was Lord Howe Island before spending three weeks in Fiji where she visited missionary stations while she waited to rendezvous with the Herald. After three weeks she left for New Caledonia, without meeting up with the Herald and travelled to missionary stations at Aneityum, after surveying the area she left on 8 July. On her way back to Sydney/ she faced a series of squalls, one of which blew off her paddle box, the captain's pantry, the signal locker and the men's round house. She finally made it back to Sydney on 2 September 1854.

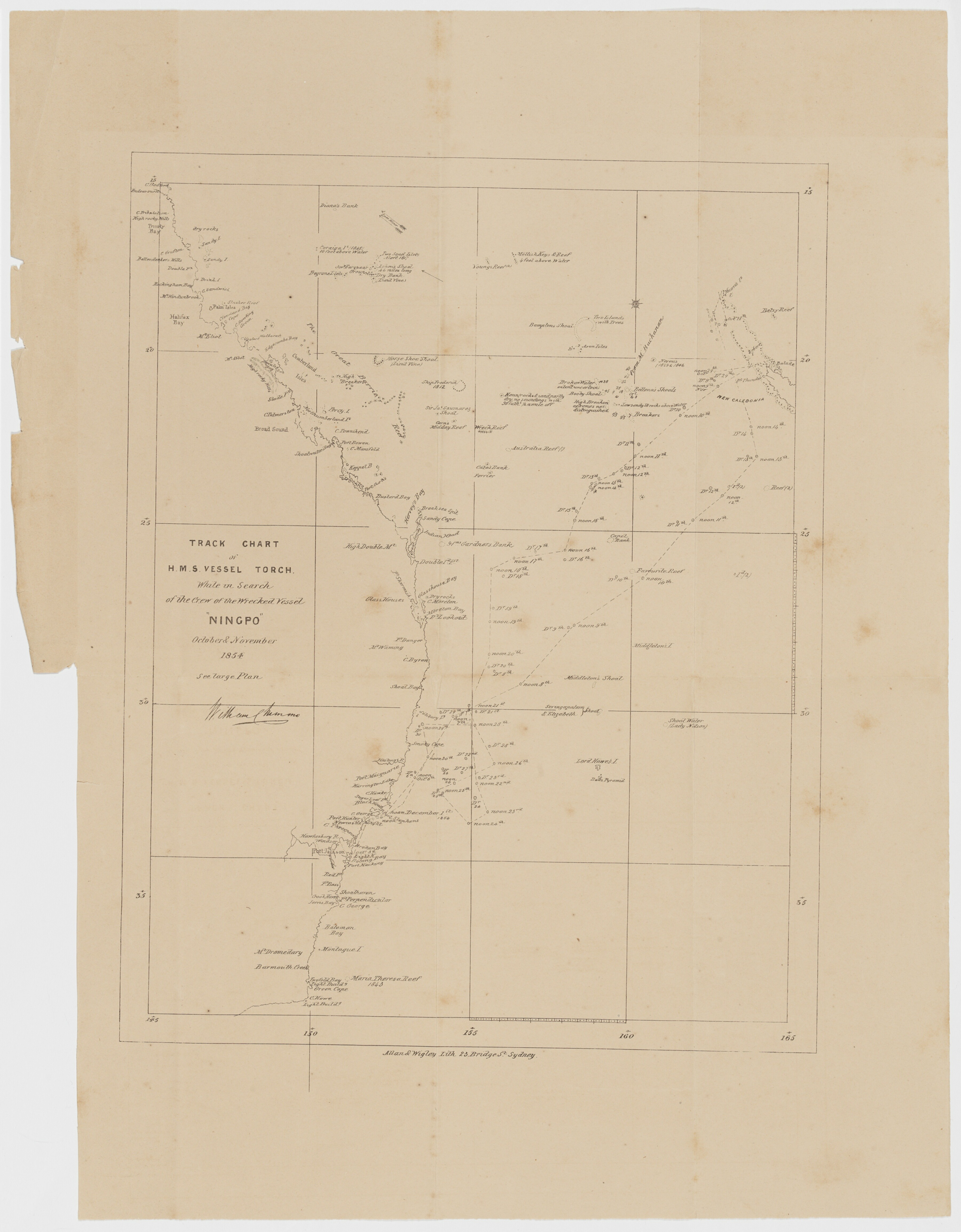
Track chart of HMS Torch searching for "Ningpo", 1854

The following month, the Torch was engaged on one of her more significant voyages. She rescued the survivors of the shipwrecked Chinese junk Ningpoto in the D'Entrecasteaux Islands, off New Guinea. This trip was conducted mainly under sail to try to save her coal supplies for navigating the reefs. After searching the islands for five days, they found the 19 survivors on "Middle Huon Island". Chimmo hoped to be able to steer the Torch back to Fiji to continue her duties with HMS Herald, but a lack of coal forced her to return to Sydney. She arrived there on 2 December 1854.

In 1855, Torch under Captain Chimmo sailed to the Northumberland Islands, Queensland, and conducted an investigation into the killing of botanist Frederick Strange and three members of the crew of his ship Vision by Aboriginal people at Middle Percy Island. He decided to take ten of the islanders prisoner. These prisoners, including three women and three children, were sent to Sydney for trial. One child died in custody and the rest were eventually shipped back to Gladstone.

In August 1855, the New South Wales Legislative Council argued about the continued funding of the Torch and its role as a gunship to protect Sydney Harbour. There were protests about the realities of such a small ship acting as a defence against a foreign fleet. Politicians like Stuart Donaldson, who would become the first Premier of the Colony the following year, publicly ridiculed the idea. Even in the face of this opposition the Legislative Council still voted to provision and pay the wages of the ship for 1856.

On 15 May 1856, the Torch was advertised for unreserved sale at Bowden and Threlkled auctioneers in George Street, Sydney. Other Sydneysiders like Frederick Howard welcomed the decision. In a letter to his sister Emily, dated 25 May 1856 he told her that

HMS Torch, former tender to HMS Herald sold to Dan Egan for 2400 pounds having originally cost the government 20,000 pounds and cost the Hydrographic office about the same amount during the last 4 years during which time she has done nothing whatever towards the survey.
