= HMS Conqueror =

Ten ships of the Royal Navy have been named HMS Conqueror, and another was planned:

- HMS Conqueror (1745) was an 8-gun fireship captured from the French by HMS Lowestoffe in 1745 and sold in 1748.
- HMS Conqueror (1758) was a 68-gun third rate launched in 1758 and wrecked in 1760.
- HMS Conqueror (1773) was a 74-gun third rate launched in 1773 and broken up in 1794.
- HMS Conqueror (1801) was a 74-gun third rate launched in 1801 and broken up in 1822.
- HMS Conqueror (1855) was a screw-propelled 101-gun first rate, launched in 1855 and wrecked in 1861.
- HMS Conqueror was a 120-gun Caledonia-class first rate launched in 1833 as HMS Waterloo. She was rearmed to 89 guns and converted to steam propulsion in 1859, and was renamed Conqueror in 1862. In 1877 she was renamed Warspite and served as a training ship at for the Marine Society. She was burnt in 1918.
- HMS Conqueror (1881) was a Conqueror-class monitor launched in 1881 and sold in 1907.
- HMS Conqueror (1911) was an Orion-class battleship launched in 1911 and sold in 1922.
- HMS Conqueror (1939) was to have been a Lion-class battleship. She was laid down in 1939 but construction was suspended later that year, and she was cancelled entirely in 1945.
- HMS Conqueror (F33) was a private yacht requisitioned in 1939 to serve as an auxiliary anti-aircraft vessel, and was returned to her owner in 1945.
- HMS Conqueror (S48) was a Churchill-class nuclear submarine launched in 1969, she was paid off and laid up in 1990.

== Battle honours ==
Ships named HMS Conqueror have earned the following battle honours;

- Lagos 1759
- The Saints 1782
- Trafalgar 1805
- Jutland 1916
- North Sea 1942–43
- English Channel 1943–45
- Biscay 1944
- Atlantic 1944–45
- Falklands Islands 1982

== See also ==
- HMY Conqueror II, an armed yacht commissioned in 1915 and sunk in 1916.
