= HMS Waterloo (1833) =

Ship of the line of the Royal Navy

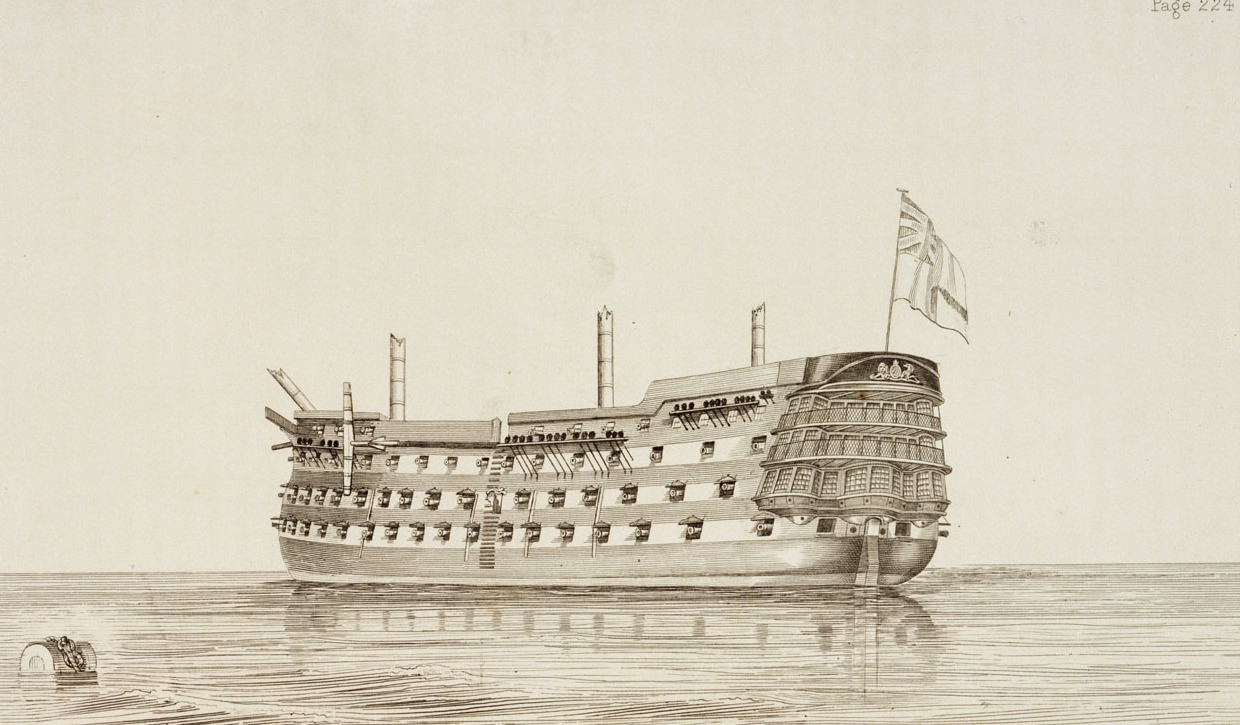
- 1833 illustration of Waterloo

History

United Kingdom
- Name: Waterloo
- Namesake: Battle of Waterloo
- Ordered: 9 September 1823
- Builder: Chatham Dockyard
- Laid down: March 1827
- Launched: 10 June 1833
- Commissioned: 5 August 1851
- Decommissioned: Paid off, 21 February 1866
- Renamed: Conqueror, 27 February 1862; Warspite, 11 August 1876
- Reclassified: As a training ship, 1876
- Fate: Destroyed by fire, 20 January 1918

General characteristics (as built)
- Class & type: Broadened Caledonia-class ship of the line
- Tons burthen: 2,694 3/94 (bm)
- Length: 205 ft 6 in (62.6 m) (gun deck)
- Beam: 55 ft 3 in (16.8 m)
- Draught: 17 ft 11 in (5.5 m) (light)
- Depth of hold: 23 ft 2 in (7.06 m)
- Propulsion: Sails
- Sail plan: Full-rigged ship
- Complement: 900
- Armament: 120 muzzle-loading, smoothbore guns: Lower gun deck: 30 × 32 pdr guns, 2 × 68 pdr carronades; Middle gun deck: 32 × 32 pdr guns, 2 × 68 pdr carronades; Upper gun deck: 32 × 32 pdr guns, 2 × 68 pdr carronades; Quarterdeck: 16 × 32 pdr carrondaes; Forecastle: 2 × 32 pdrs, 2 × 32 pdr carronades

General characteristics (after conversion)
- Displacement: 3,440 long tons (3,500 t)
- Tons burthen: 2,845 (bm)
- Length: 218 ft 2 in (66 m) (gun deck)
- Installed power: Boilers; 2,048 ihp (1,527 kW)
- Propulsion: 1 shaft; 1 single-expansion steam engine
- Speed: 10 knots (19 km/h; 12 mph)
- Complement: 830
- Armament: 89 guns; Lower gun deck: 32 × 8 in (203 mm) shell guns; Upper gun deck: 34 × 32 pdr guns; Forecastle & Quarterdeck: 22 × 32 pdr guns + 1 × 68 pdr gun

HMS Waterloo was a three-deck, 120-gun, first-rate, broadened Caledonia-class ship of the line built for the Royal Navy during the 1830s. The ship remained in ordinary until she was commissioned as a flagship in 1851. She was razeed and converted into a steam-powered, 89-gun, second rate, two decker in 1859–1860. Waterloo was renamed Conqueror in 1862 and participated in the Shimonoseki campaign two years later. Paid off in 1866, the ship was renamed Warspite 10 years later and became a training ship. She was destroyed by arson in 1918.

== Description ==
The Caledonia class was an improved version of HMS Hibernia with additional freeboard to allow them to fight all their guns in heavy weather. The broadened sub-class had their beam increased to improve their stability. Waterloo measured 205 feet 6 inches (62.6 m) on the gun deck and 170 feet 6 inches (52.0 m) on the keel. She had a beam of 55 feet 3 inches (16.8 m), a depth of hold of 23 feet 2 inches (7.1 m), a light draught of 17 feet 11 inches (5.46 m) and had a tonnage of 2,718 3/94 tons burthen. Her crew numbered 820 officers and ratings in peacetime and 900 in wartime. Waterloo had three masts and was ship rigged.

The ship was armed with 120 muzzle-loading, smoothbore guns that consisted of thirty 32-pounder (56 cwt) guns (Note: "Cwt" is the abbreviation for hundredweight, 56 cwt referring to the weight of the gun.) and two 8 in (203 mm) shell guns on her lower gun deck, thirty-two 32-pounder (55 cwt) guns and two 8-inch shell guns on her middle gun deck and thirty-four 32-pounders on her upper gun deck. Her forecastle and quarterdeck carried a total of six 32-pounders and fourteen short 32-pounder guns between them.

=== Conversion ===
After the Crimean War, the naval arms race in screw-powered ships of the line between Britain and France resumed. In mid-1858 Captain Baldwin Wake Walker, Surveyor of the Navy, estimated that Britain would have 36 battleships to France's 40 by the end of 1859. He persuaded the Admiralty to authorize the cutting down and conversion of the 120-gun first rates of the Caledonia and Nelson classes into steam-powered second rates based on the successful conversion of the second rate London. Waterloo was ordered to be converted in early 1859. She was lengthened at the stern to 218 feet 2 inches (66 m) at the gun deck and 178 feet 11 inches (54.5 m) at the keel. These changes modestly increased her tons burthen to 2,845 and gave her a displacement of 3,440 long tons (3,500 t). The ship was fitted with a two-cylinder single-expansion steam engine of 500-nominal horsepower built by Ravenhill, Selkeld & Co. that gave the ship a speed of 10 knots (19 km/h; 12 mph) during her sea trials on 17 April 1863 from 1,890 indicated horsepower (1,410 kW). To reduce drag and improve performance under sail, the ship could hoist her propeller into the hull and retract the telescoping funnel.

The lower gun deck armament of the converted ships consisted of thirty-two 8-inch shell guns while the upper gun deck had thirty-four 32-pounders of 56 cwt. The combined armament of the forecastle and quarterdeck totalled twenty-two 32-pounders (42 cwt) and a single 68-pounder (95 cwt) pivot gun.

== Construction and career ==
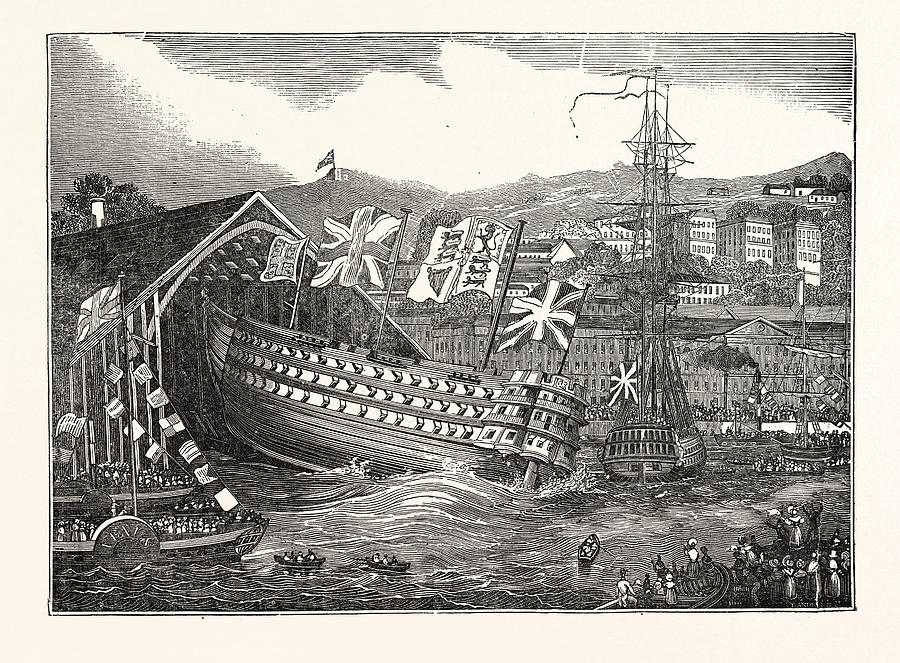
Launch of HMS Waterloo at Chatham

Named after the British victory at the Battle of Waterloo, Waterloo was the second ship of her name to serve in the RN. She was ordered on 5 October 1824, laid down at Chatham Dockyard in March 1827, launched on 18 June 1833 and moved to Sheerness Dockyard on 19 July to be placed in ordinary. The ship was commissioned by Captain Montagu Stopford on 5 August 1851 as she was intended to serve as the flagship of Vice-Admiral James Dundas, commander-in-chief of the Mediterranean Fleet, although Britannia was sent instead.

Waterloo was completed in December as the flagship of Vice-Admiral Josceline Percy, Commander-in-Chief, Sheerness, and Captain George Mundy replaced Stopford in January 1852. Captain Lord Frederick Kerr relieved Mundy on 9 December 1853. The ship served as the flagship for all of the subsequent commanders-in-chief at Sheerness until she was paid off on 28 February 1859.

Walker ordered that Waterloo be cut down one deck and converted to screw propulsion on 5 February 1859 and work began on 1 April. She was undocked on 12 November 1859 and completed on April 1860. Following the loss of the modern two-deck, 101-gun, steam-powered Conqueror in 1861, Waterloo was renamed Conqueror on 27 February 1862. The ship was commissioned on 24 November 1863 by Captain William Luard for service on the China Station. By this time her armament had been reduced to 78 guns, including a number of rifled breech-loading Armstrong guns, notably a pair of 110-pounders, ten 40-pounders and a single 20-pounder.

Earlier in 1863 the Japanese Chōshū clan began to fire without warning on foreign ships traversing the Shimonoseki Straits. This narrow waterway separates the islands of Honshū and Kyūshū and provides a passage connecting the Inland Sea with the Sea of Japan. The Americans and French had bombarded Chōshū fortifications and sunk ships in retaliation, but the Japanese repaired the damage and continued to attack foreign ships. The British Minister to Japan, Sir Rutherford Alcock persuaded his French, Dutch and American counterparts that a coordinated military effort was required to restore freedom of navigation in mid-1864.

The combined squadron of 17 ships was under the command of Rear-Admiral Augustus Kuper and the ships rendezvoused off Himeshima Island on 2 September. Kuper positioned his ships equipped with 110-pounder guns, including Conqueror, about 2,500 yards (2,300 m) away from the Japanese forts, in the belief that they would be out of range of the Japanese guns, but their own guns could still reach the forts. The Western ships opened fire on the afternoon of 5 September and silenced the guns with a few hours. Conqueror's 110-pounders did not have any problems with their vent pieces as did some other ships, but did report problems with their gun carriages which were neither designed for firing at high elevations, nor for the recoil forces of such powerful guns.

The following morning the ship unloaded a battalion of 450 Royal Marines and a hundred-sailor landing party of her own to disable the guns by driving a spike into their touch holes and damage the fortifications as much as possible. Having accomplished this task, the troops were re-embarked without further incident that afternoon. Japanese troops having not made an appearance by the morning of 7 September, working parties were then landed to load the disabled guns; 62 of all calibers being seized. Conqueror had two crewmen killed and four wounded during the bombardment and ashore. The ship was paid off on 21 February 1866.

On 11 August 1876 she was renamed Warspite and loaned to the Marine Society to serve as a training ship at Woolwich. The ship was moved to Greenhithe in 1901. The ship was destroyed by fire on 20 January 1918, with 250 boys embarked at the time. Three teenage boys later claimed to have started the fire deliberately. They were charged for the alleged act and ordered to three years' detention at a reformatory.
