= HMS Royal George (1827) =

Ship of the line of the Royal Navy

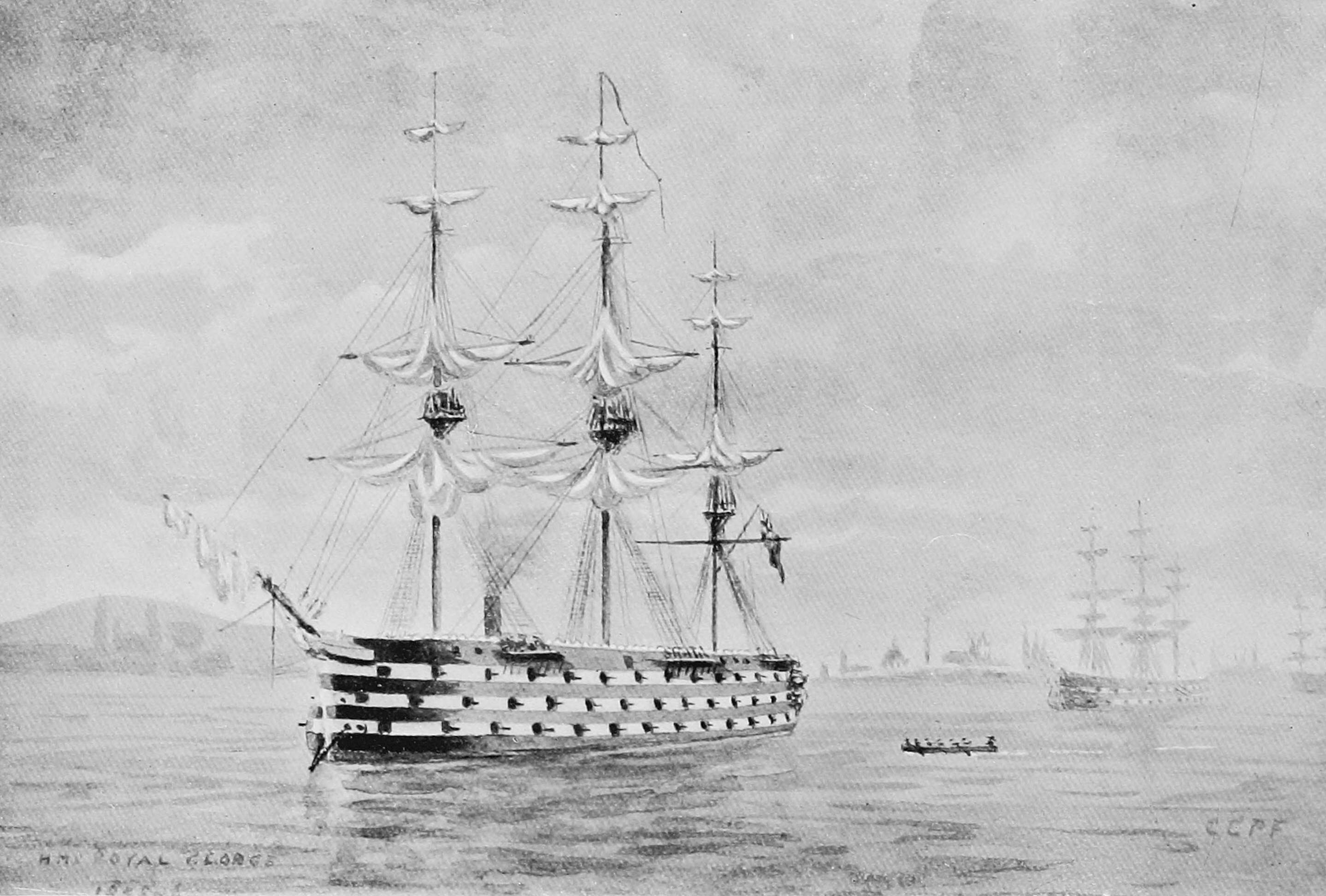
- Depiction of HMS Royal George by Charles Fitzgerald

History

United Kingdom
- Name: Royal George
- Ordered: 2 June 1819
- Builder: Chatham Dockyard
- Laid down: June 1823
- Launched: 22 September 1827
- Completed: 3 December 1827
- Commissioned: April 1864
- Renamed: From Neptune, 12 February 1823
- Fate: Sold for scrap, 23 January 1875

General characteristics (as built)
- Class & type: Caledonia-class ship of the line
- Tons burthen: 2,615 17/94 bm
- Length: 205 ft 8 in (62.7 m) (gun deck)
- Beam: 54 ft 7 in (16.6 m)
- Draught: 18 ft 3 in (5.6 m)
- Depth of hold: 23 ft 2 in (7.1 m)
- Sail plan: Full-rigged ship
- Complement: 900 (wartime)
- Armament: 120 muzzle-loading, smoothbore guns: Lower gun deck: 32 × 32 pdr guns; Middle gun deck: 34 × 24 pdr guns; Upper gun deck: 34 × 24 pdr Congreve guns; Quarterdeck: 6 × 12 pdr guns, 10 × 32 pdr carronades; Forecastle: 2 × 12 pdrs, 2 × 32 pdr carronades

General characteristics (after conversion)
- Displacement: 4,205 long tons (4,272 t)
- Installed power: Boilers; 1,417 ihp (1,057 kW)
- Propulsion: 1 shaft; 1 trunk steam engine
- Speed: 6.7 knots (12.4 km/h; 7.7 mph)
- Complement: 950
- Armament: Lower gun deck: 8 × 8 in (203 mm) shell guns + 24 × 32 pdr guns; Middle gun deck: 4 × 8 in shell guns + 30 × 32 pdr guns; Upper gun deck: 34 × 32 pdr guns; Forecastle & Quarterdeck: 6 × 32 pdr guns, 14 × 32 pdr carronades

HMS Royal George was a first-rate, modified Caledonia-class ship of the line built for the Royal Navy (RN) during the 1820s. Armed with 120 guns and completed in 1827, she was immediately placed in reserve, or "in ordinary" as the RN termed it. The ship was converted to screw power in 1852–1853 during a naval arms race between Britain and France. Royal George was assigned to the Baltic Fleet during the Crimean War of 1854–1856 with the Russian Empire, but saw no combat during the war. She was used as a troopship to bring troops back to Britain after the war. After serving as a guard ship in 1858, the ship was razeed down to a two-deck, 89-gun second rate in 1860. Royal George served as a guard ship in Ireland from 1864 to 1869 until she was paid off at the end of that year. The ship was sold for scrap in 1875.

== Description ==
The Caledonia class was an improved version of HMS Hibernia with additional freeboard to allow them to fight all their guns in heavy weather. Royal George was modified with an extra layer of fir added to her hull to improve ability to carry the heavier weight of her new armament of all 32-pounder guns. She measured 205 feet 8 inches (62.7 m) on the gun deck and 171 feet (52.1 m) on the keel. The ship had a beam of 54 feet 7 inches (16.6 m), a depth of hold of 23 feet 2 inches (7.1 m), and a tonnage of 2,615 17/94 tons burthen. Her crew numbered 900 officers and ratings. Royal George had three masts and was ship rigged.

The ship's armament was authorized as 120 muzzle-loading, smoothbore guns that consisted of thirty-two 32-pounder (56 cwt) guns (Note: "Cwt" is the abbreviation for hundredweight, 56 cwt referring to the weight of the gun.) on her lower gun deck, thirty-four 24-pounder (49 cwt) guns on her middle gun deck and thirty-six 24-pounder Congreve guns on her upper gun deck. A pair of 12-pounder guns and two 32-pounder carronades were intended for her forecastle and six 12-pounders and ten 32-pounder carronades for her quarterdeck.

=== Steam conversion ===
Never having seen active service, Captain Baldwin Wake Walker, the Surveyor of the Navy, ordered Royal George to be converted into a screw-propelled ship of the line in 1852 over concerns about the number of French screw ships of the line under construction. No significant structural modifications were made to the ship, although the extra layer of fir had been removed in February 1833, which reduced her beam to 53 feet 6 inches (16.3 m). The ship received a 400-nominal horsepower engine built by John Penn and Sons. Her boilers produced enough steam that the two-cylinder trunk steam engine produced 1,417 indicated horsepower (1,057 kW) which gave Royal George a speed of 8.7 knots (16.1 km/h; 10.0 mph) during her sea trials. To reduce drag and improve performance under sail, the ship could hoist her propeller into the hull and retract the telescoping funnel. The ship's complement increased to 950 men and she had a displacement of 4,205 long tons (4,272 t).

Royal George's lower gun deck armament consisted of eight 8-inch (203 mm) (65 cwt) shell guns and twenty-four 32-pounders (56 cwt) while the middle gun deck had another four 8-inch shell guns and thirty 50 cwt 32-pounders. The upper gun deck had thirty-four 42 cwt 32-pounders. The combined armament of the forecastle and quarterdeck totalled six 32-pounders (45 cwt) and fourteen 32-pounder carronades.

== Construction and career ==
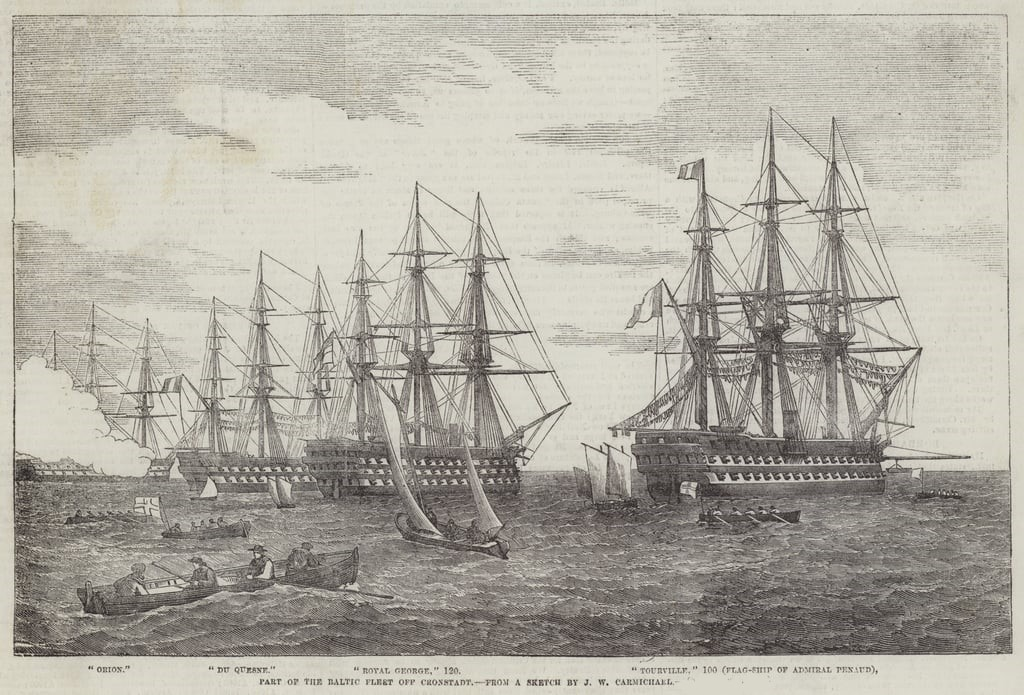
Part of the Baltic Fleet off Cronstadt, ships L-R; Orion; Du Quesne; Royal George; Tourville, Flag Ship of Admiral Penaud. Illustrated London News 1855

Honouring the first kings of the Hanoverian dynasty, Royal George was the sixth ship of her name to serve in the RN. The ship was ordered on 2 June 1819 with the name of Neptune and was renamed on 12 February 1823. She was laid down at HM Dockyard, Chatham, in June 1823 and launched on 22 September 1827. The ship was completed on 3 December, but she was not fitted for sea; she was roofed over fore and aft at Sheerness Dockyard and remained in ordinary. Royal George was used as a stage to help build a roof over a dock at Sheerness. Walker ordered her conversion to steam propulsion on 30 October 1852 and work began on 1 November. The ship was undocked on 22 June 1853, commissioned on 25 October by Captain Sir Henry Codrington, and was completed on 18 December.

The decisive Russian victory in the Battle of Sinop over the Ottoman Navy on 30 November alarmed politicians in both Britain and France. They decided to intervene on the side of the Ottomans and the British began forming a Baltic Fleet in February 1854 in anticipation of war. The Russians did not withdraw their forces in the Balkans as demanded by the British and French governments on 27 February and declarations of war by both governments followed a month later. Admiral Sir Charles Napier, commander-in-chief of the Baltic Fleet, was charged to blockade the exit from the Baltic Sea and all of the Russian ports therein. Royal George was part of his initial forces that left Spithead on 11 March and proceeded towards the mouth of the Gulf of Finland in mid-April. The ship did not participate in any action in 1854 and was part of the force based near Nargen Island (now Naissaar) blockading Reval (now Tallinn) and the southern coast of the Gulf of Finland by late 1854. By 19 October, bad weather had forced the ships to withdraw to Kiel, Germany, where they blockaded the entrance to the Baltic Sea until December when they were ordered home.

The ship had proven to be very crank in the Baltic and her forecastle and poop were removed upon her arrival at Sheerness in an attempt to alleviate the problem. This reduced her armament to 102 guns with the forecastle and quarterdeck guns replaced by a pair of 68-pounder guns. She returned to the Baltic in April, although the fleet did not proceed past Kiel until 2–3 May after the last of the solid ice in the Baltic had receded. Royal George again played no significant role in the campaign. Captain Robert Spencer Robinson relieved Codrington on 13 February 1856 and the ship was used to bring back troops from the Crimea. She served as the flagship of Vice-Admiral Sir George Seymour, Commander-in-Chief, Portsmouth, during the naval review for Queen Victoria at Spithead on 23 April and was paid off on 29 August.

Royal George was recommissioned by Captain John Fitzgerald on 9 April 1858 as the guardship at Sheerness and she was paid off on 1 July. The ship was cut down to a two-deck, 89-gun, second rate at Devonport Dockyard in 1860 as her upper works had started to rot. She now had a draught of 22 feet 6 inches (6.9 m) forward and 24 feet 2 inches (7.4 m) aft with a crew of 830 men. Her armament now consisted of thirty-two 89-inch shell guns on the lower gun deck and thirty-four 32-pounders on the upper gun deck. The forecastle and quarterdeck had a total of twenty-two 42 cwt 32 pounders and a single 68-pounder on a pivot mount. Royal George was reduced to 86 guns in 1861, 78 guns in 1863 and 72 guns in 1866.

She was recommissioned in April 1864 by Captain Michael de Courcy as the guard ship for Kingstown (modern Dún Laoghaire), Ireland. Captain Thomas Miller relieved de Courcy on 3 April 1865. The ship participated in the naval review at Spithead in July 1867. On 27 October, Royal George was driven ashore at Kingstown, County Dublin. She was refloated with assistance from RMS Ulster. By January 1869 the ship was commanded by Captain Robert Jenkins before she was paid off on 31 December. Royal George was sold to Henry Castle & Sons for scrap on 23 January 1875 and broken up at Charlton, London.
