= HMS Nelson (1814) =

Ship of the line of the Royal Navy

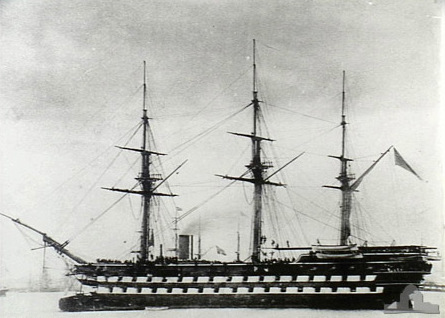
- HMVS Nelson, photographed between 1870 and 1879

History

United Kingdom
- Name: Nelson
- Namesake: Vice-Admiral Horatio Nelson
- Ordered: 23 November 1805
- Builder: Woolwich Dockyard
- Laid down: December 1809
- Launched: 4 July 1814
- Fate: Sold for scrap, August 1920

General characteristics (as sailing ship)
- Class & type: Nelson-class ship of the line
- Tons burthen: 2,617 (bm)
- Length: 205 ft (62 m) (gundeck)
- Beam: 53 ft 8 in (16.36 m)
- Depth of hold: 24 ft (7.3 m)
- Sail plan: Full-rigged ship
- Complement: 850
- Armament: 120 muzzle-loading, smoothbore guns: Lower gun deck: 32 × 32 pdr guns; Middle gun deck: 34 × 24 pdr guns; Upper gun deck: 34 × 18 pdr guns; Quarterdeck: 6 × 12 pdr guns, 10 × 32 pdr carronades; Forecastle: 2 × 12 pdrs, 2 × 32 pdr carronades; Poop deck: 6 × 18 pdr carronades

General characteristics (as converted)
- Displacement: 3,158 long tons (3,209 t)
- Tons burthen: 2,736 (bm)
- Length: 216 ft 3 in (65.9 m) (gun deck)
- Beam: 54 ft 6 in (16.6 m)
- Draught: 21 ft 10 in (6.7 m)
- Depth of hold: 24 ft 3 in (7.39 m)
- Installed power: 4 fire-tube boilers; 2,102 ihp (1,567 kW)
- Propulsion: 1 shaft; 1 HRCR steam engine
- Speed: 11.5 knots (21.3 km/h; 13.2 mph)
- Crew: 850
- Armament: Lower gun deck: 32 × 8 in shell guns; Upper gun deck: 34 × 32 pdr guns; Forecastle & Quarterdeck: 22 × 32 pdr guns, 1 × 68 pdr gun

HMS Nelson was the lead ship of her class of three-deck, 120-gun, first-rate ships of the line built for the Royal Navy (RN) during the 1810s. Completed in 1814, she was immediately placed in reserve, or "in ordinary" as the RN termed it. The ship was razeed and converted to screw-power in 1859–1860 during a naval arms race between Britain and France.

Still in ordinary, Nelson was transferred to the Victorian Navy in 1868 as a training ship although she was initially used as a reformatory. The ship was cut down into a single deck frigate in 1878–1881 and partially rearmed with rifled breech-loading guns. She was laid up in 1891 and sold out of service in 1898. Nelson was converted into a coal lighter with her upper timbers used to build another lighter. Her hulk was ultimately sold for scrap in 1920.

== Design and description ==
The Nelson class was designed as a joint effort between the two co-Surveyors of the Navy, Robert Seppings and Joseph Tucker as improved versions of the preceding Caledonia class, Nelson measured 205 feet (62.5 m) on the gun deck and 170 feet 10 inches (52.1 m) on the keel. The ship had a beam of 53 feet 8 inches (16.4 m), a depth of hold of 24 feet (7.3 m) and had a tonnage of 2,617 11/94 tons burthen. Her crew numbered 875 officers and ratings and the ships had the usual three-masted full-ship rig.

The Nelson-class ships were armed with 120 muzzle-loading, smoothbore guns that consisted of thirty-two 32-pounder guns on the lower gun deck, thirty-four 24-pounder gun on the middle gun deck and thirty-four 18-pounder guns on the upper gun deck. Their forecastles mounted a pair of 12-pounder guns and two 32-pounder carronades. On their quarterdeck they carried six 12-pounders and ten 32-pounder carronades. Above the quarterdeck was the poop deck with half-a-dozen 18-pounder carronades.

=== Conversion ===
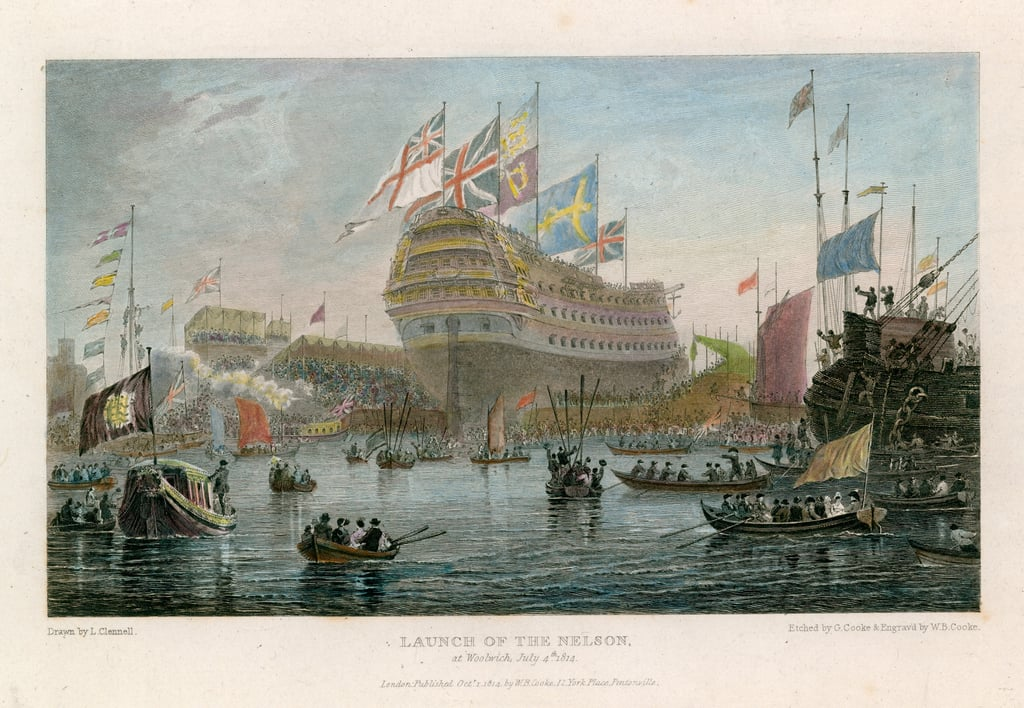
The launch of the Nelson at Woolwich, 4 July 1814, by Luke Clennell

The naval arms race between France and Britain in steam-propelled ships of the line resumed after the Crimean War ended in 1856. Based on the experience gained during the war, Captain Sir Baldwin Wake Walker, Surveyor of the Navy, favored converting first- and second-rate ships as they could accommodate the engines and their required coal better than smaller ships. He ordered Nelson to be razeed and converted into an 89-gun, two-deck, second rate in 1859 along the lines of London's very successful conversion. This involved lengthening the ship to 216 feet 3 inches (65.9 m) at the gun deck and 178 feet 7 inches (54.4 m) at the keel. Her beam increased to 54 feet 6 inches (16.6 m) and her depth of hold to 23 feet 3 inches (7.1 m). Her tonnage modestly increased to 2,736 tons burthen and she (displaced) 3,158 long tons (3,209 t). Nelson now had a draught of 17 feet 6 inches (5.3 m) forward and 21 feet 10 inches (6.7 m) aft.

The ship was fitted with a 500-nominal horsepower, two-cylinder, horizontal-return, connecting rod-steam engine. Her boilers provided enough steam to give the ship a speed of 11.5 knots (21.3 km/h; 13.2 mph) from 2,102 indicated horsepower (1,567 kW) during her sea trials in Stokes Bay on 21 June 1860, although her masts were not fitted, nor did Nelson have her stores aboard. To reduce drag and improve performance under sail, the ship could hoist her propeller into the hull and retract the telescoping funnel.

The lower gun deck armament of the converted ship consisted of thirty-two 8-inch (65 cwt) (Note: "Cwt" is the abbreviation for hundredweight, 65 cwt referring to the weight of the gun.) shell guns and the upper gun deck had thirty-four 32-pounders (56 cwt). The combined armament of the forecastle and quarterdeck totalled twenty-two 32-pounders (42 cwt) and a single 68-pounder (95 cwt) pivot gun.

== Construction and career ==
Named in honour of Vice-Admiral Horatio Nelson after his death during the Battle of Trafalgar in October 1805, Nelson was the first ship of her name to serve in the RN, and was ordered on 23 November 1805. The ship was laid down at Woolwich Dockyard in December 1809 and launched on 4 July 1814. Upon her completion on 17 August, but before she was commissioned, she was placed in ordinary at Portsmouth Dockyard. The ship received a "Very Large Repair" between October 1825 and September 1828 during which she was roofed over fore and aft and had her hull "doubled" by adding an extra layer of wood. The doubling was removed in September 1837. Nelson was refitted as an "Advanced ship" in April–June 1846 so she could be activated more quickly, which meant that all of her guns were aboard and more of her masts were fitted; the rest of her rigging and stores were in a designated warehouse. Walker ordered Nelson to be converted into a screw-powered ship on 5 February 1859 and work began on 10 March. She was undocked on 7 February 1860 and completed on 1 September and returned to the reserve.

In February 1867, the government of the Colony of Victoria requested the permanent loan of Nelson for use as a training ship, and she was transferred on 7 February. The ship was commissioned into the Victorian Navy on 22 July. Nelson was refitted to suit her new role and rearmed with a pair of 68-pounder guns that had been bored out and converted into 7-inch (178 mm) rifled muzzle-loading guns positioned on the forecastle to act as chase guns. The upper gun deck was fitted with twenty 32-pounder (42 cwt) guns and the lower had twenty rifled RML 64-pounder guns. The ship sailed for Australia in October with a hired crew, arriving at Williamstown Dockyard on 4 February 1868. Nelson was initially used as a reformatory ship and her permanent crew only numbered 36 officers and ratings. During this time she never left Port Phillip Bay.

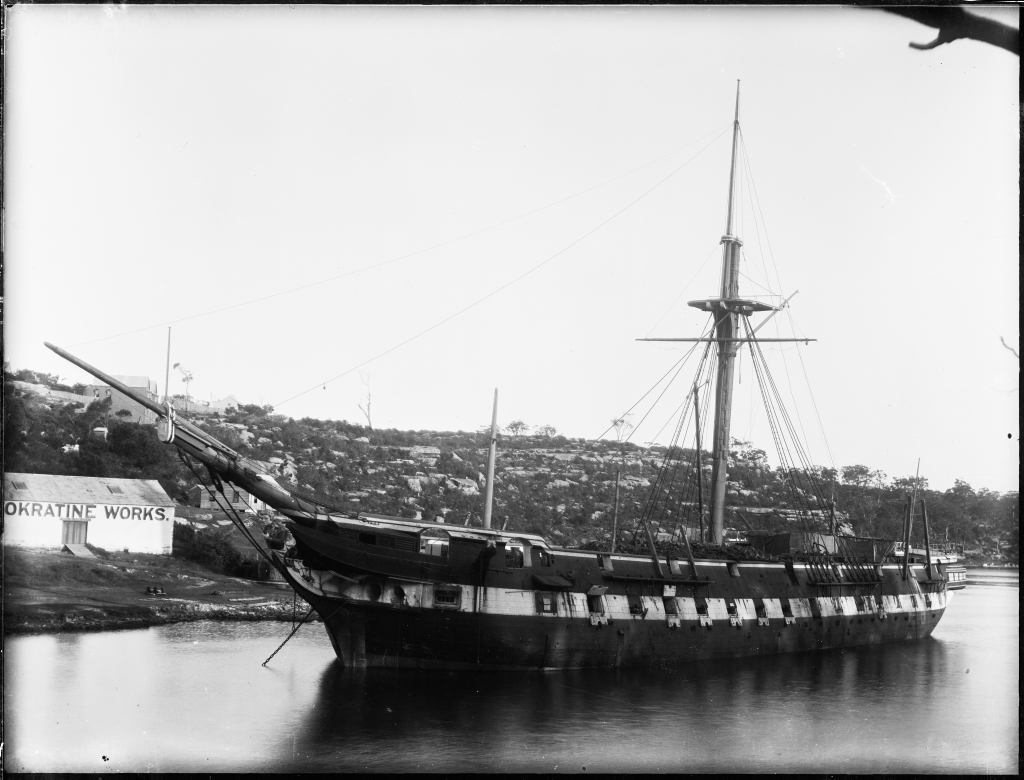
Nelson in 1898, cut down to a single deck

In 1876 the ship participated in wargames that included an attack on the Williamstown coast defences. Warscares with the Russian Empire and reports of Russian ships off the Australian coast prompted the colonial government to reclassify her as a warship the following year. Nelson was further cut down to a single deck in 1878–1881 and her rig reduced to the main mast only, the ship being reclassified as a frigate. She retained her 7-inch guns, but the number of muzzle-loading guns was reduced to two or four 64-pounders; a pair of quick-firing 4.7-inch (120 mm) guns were added as were eight smaller rifled breech-loading guns.

Budget cuts during the 1880s caused the ship to be laid up at Williamstown in 1891. Two years later her boilers were removed and she was listed for disposal. On 28 April 1898 she was put up for auction and sold to Bernard Einerson of Sydney. The ship was towed to Port Jackson and Nelson was cut down yet again in 1900 to create a coal lighter that kept the name Nelson, the upper timbers being used to build a drogher named Oceanic. Nelson was sold to the Union Steamship Co. of New Zealand in 1908, and in July was towed from Sydney to Beauty Point, Tasmania, for use as a coal storage hulk. In January 1915 she was towed to Hobart for further service as a coal hulk, until sold in August 1920 to Mr. H Gray for £500 and towed upriver to Shag Bay for gradual demolition.

The ship's figurehead was preserved by the NSW Naval Brigade, then the Royal Australian Navy, before it was presented to the Australian National Maritime Museum for display.
