= Henry Codrington =

Royal Navy Admiral of the Fleet (1808–1877)

Admiral of the Fleet Sir Henry Codrington KCB
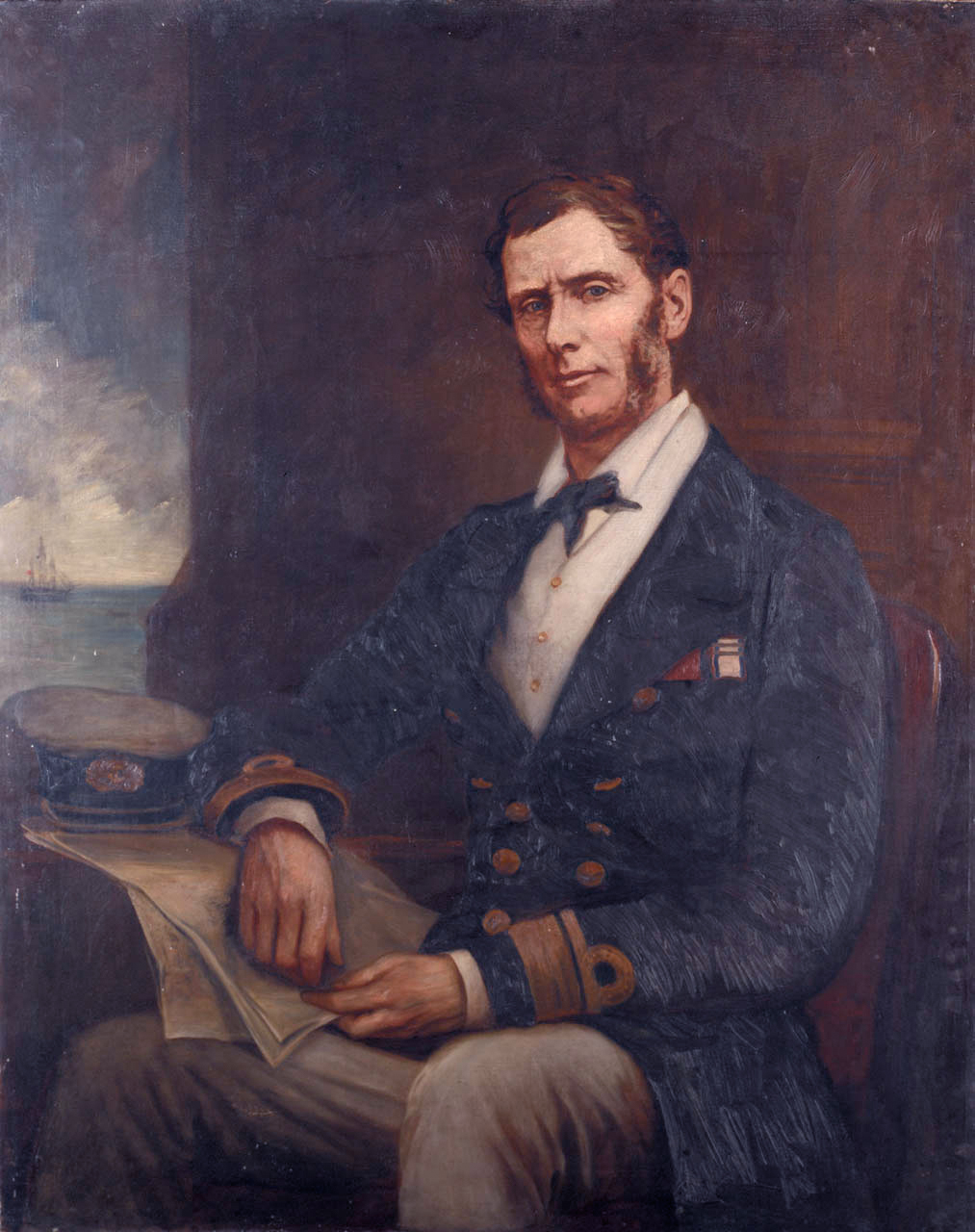
- Rear-Admiral Henry John Codrington (Lowes Cato Dickinson)
- Born: 17 August 1808
- Died: 4 August 1877 (aged 68); Eaton Square, London
- Military career
- Allegiance: United Kingdom
- Branch: Royal Navy
- Service years: 1823–1872
- Rank: Admiral of the Fleet
- Commands: HMS Orestes; HMS Talbot; HMS Queen; HMS St Vincent; HMS Thetis; HMS Royal George; Malta Dockyard; Plymouth Command
- Conflicts: Greek War of Independence; Egyptian–Ottoman War; Crimean War
- Awards: Knight Commander of the Order of the Bath

Admiral of the Fleet Sir Henry John Codrington KCB (17 October 1808 – 4 August 1877) was a Royal Navy officer. As a junior officer, he saw action during the Greek War of Independence and was present at the Battle of Navarino. He later undertook a survey of enemy positions prior to the bombardment of Acre during the Egyptian–Ottoman War.

As a captain, Codrington provided refuge on board ship for Leopold II, Grand Duke of Tuscany and his family who were fleeing from revolutionary forces and then commanded HMS Royal George in the Baltic Sea during the Crimean War. He went on to be Admiral superintendent of Malta Dockyard and then Commander-in-Chief, Plymouth.

== Early career ==
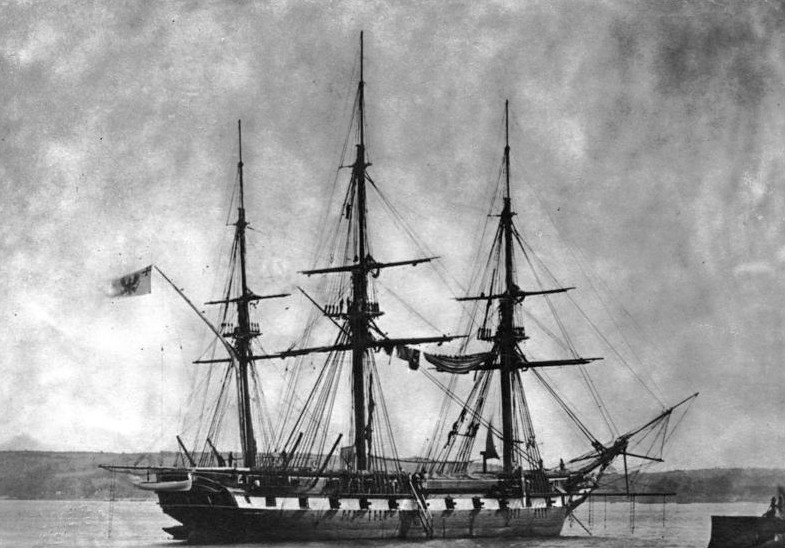
The fifth-rate HMS Thetis, refuge to Leopold II, Grand Duke of Tuscany under Codrington's command

Born the son of Admiral Sir Edward Codrington and Jane Hall. His great grandfather was Sir William Codrington, 1st Baronet of Dodington Park.

Codrington joined the Royal Navy in February 1823. He was initially appointed to the fifth-rate HMS Apollo at Portsmouth and then transferred to the fifth-rate HMS Sybille at Deptford in July 1824. Promoted to midshipman, he transferred to the fifth-rate HMS Naiad in August 1824 and took park in operations against pirates later in the year, supporting the blockade of Algiers by British forces; he then served in the British squadron off Greece, during the Greek War of Independence. He transferred to the second-rate HMS Asia, flagship of the Commander-in-Chief, Mediterranean Fleet, in October 1826 and was present at the Battle of Navarino in October 1827. During the battle he acted as signal midshipman and was wounded and, following the action during which the Ottoman fleet was destroyed, he was awarded the Russian Order of St. Vladimir, the French Legion of Honour and the Greek Order of the Redeemer for his services.

After serving briefly in the third-rate HMS Warspite and then in the fifth-rate HMS Madagascar, Codrington was promoted to lieutenant on 12 June 1829. He was appointed to the first-rate HMS Victory, flagship of the Commander-in-Chief, Portsmouth, in June 1829 and then transferred to the first-rate HMS Prince Regent, flagship of the Commander-in-Chief, The Nore, in August 1829, to the fifth-rate HMS Briton for "particular service" in April 1830 and to the first-rate HMS Caledonia, flagship of the Commander-in-Chief, Channel Squadron, for an experimental cruise in June 1831.

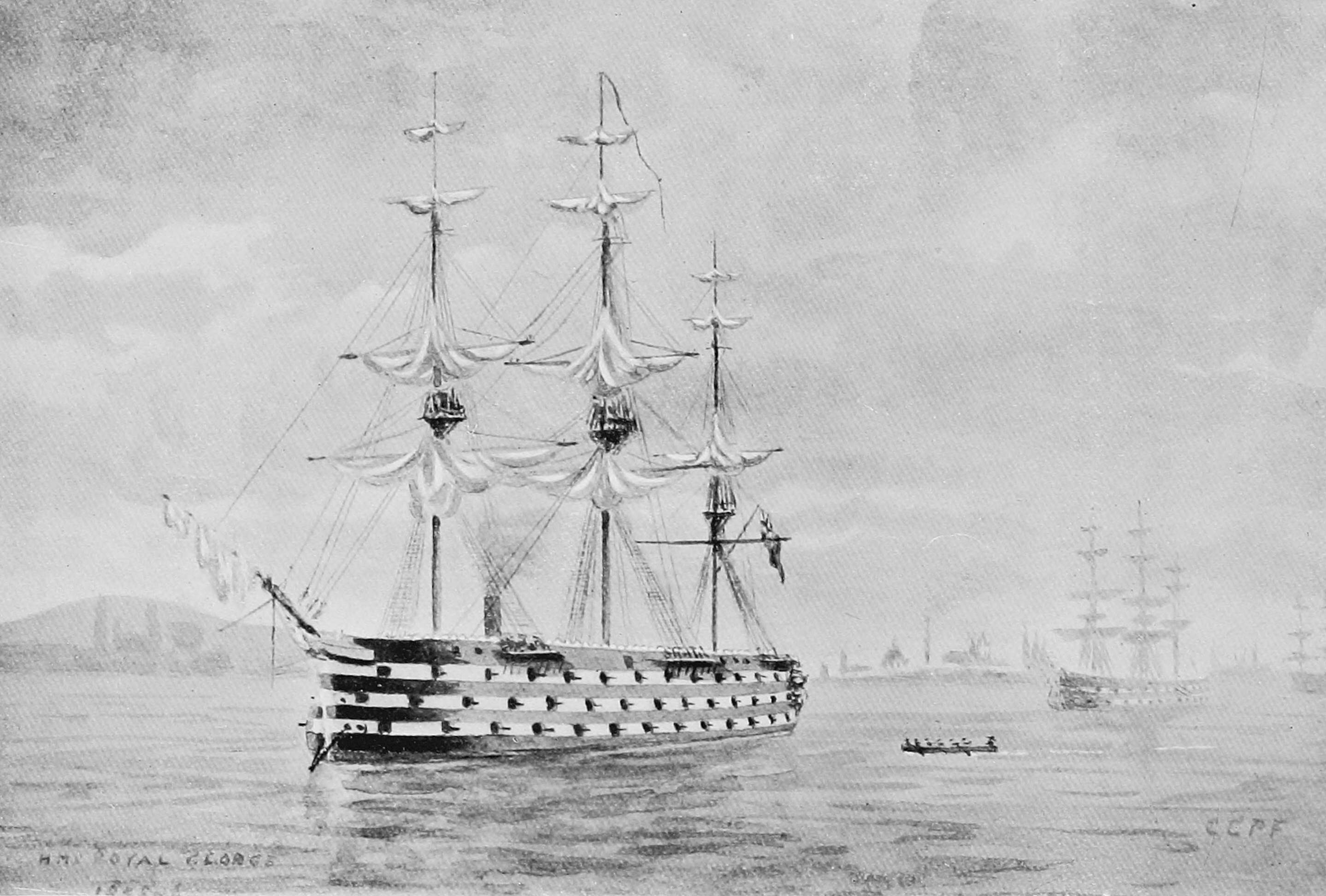
The first-rate HMS Royal George, commanded by Codrington during the Crimean War

Promoted to commander on 20 October 1831, Codrington became commanding officer of the sloop HMS Orestes in the Mediterranean Fleet in June 1834. Promoted to captain on 20 January 1836, he became commanding officer of the sixth-rate HMS Talbot in March 1838 and in that capacity undertook a survey of enemy positions prior to the bombardment of Acre in November 1840 during the Egyptian–Ottoman War. For this service he was appointed a Companion of the Order of the Bath.

Codrington went on to command the first-rate HMS Queen, his father's flagship as Commander-in-Chief, Portsmouth, in March 1841 and then to command the first-rate HMS St Vincent, his father's next flagship as Commander-in-Chief, Portsmouth, in October 1841. He became commanding officer of the fifth-rate HMS Thetis in the Mediterranean Fleet in October 1846 and provided refuge on board ship for Leopold II, Grand Duke of Tuscany and his family who were fleeing from revolutionary forces in 1848.

Codrington became commanding officer of the first-rate HMS Royal George in the Baltic Sea in October 1853 and took part in naval operations during the Crimean War. Admiral Sir Charles Napier threatened to court-martial him for failing to achieve the required standards but the Admiralty refused to support this course of action. Promoted to commodore, he was given command of a squadron of gunboats with his broad pennant in the second-rate HMS Algiers in February 1856. The Admiralty envisaged that he would lead a mission to attack the naval base at Kronstadt but the War ended with the Treaty of Paris in March 1856 and the mission was abandoned.

== Senior command ==
Promoted to rear admiral on 19 March 1857, Codrington became Admiral Superintendent of Malta Dockyard, with his flag in the first-rate HMS Hibernia, in July 1858. Promoted to vice admiral on 24 September 1863, he was advanced to Knight Commander of the Order of the Bath on 13 March 1867. Promoted to full admiral on 18 October 1867, he became Commander-in-Chief, Plymouth in November 1869. He was promoted to Admiral of the Fleet on 22 January 1877 and died at his home at Eaton Square in London on 4 August 1877.

== Family ==
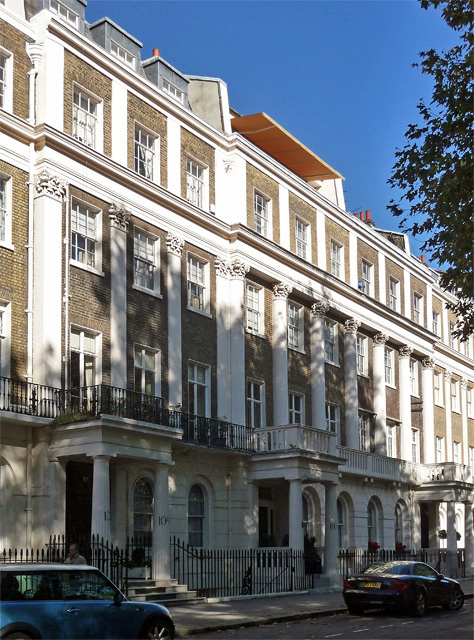
The South side of Eaton Square in London; Codrington lived at No. 112

In April 1849 Codrington married Helen Jane Webb (1828–1876); they had two daughters. They had a much publicised divorce in 1864 in which the Admiral accused her of having a close relationship with the women's rights activist Emily Faithfull. This notorious legal case, the Codrington Affair, was fictionalisd by Emma Donoghue in The Sealed Letter (2008). The novel was joint winner of the 2009 Lambda Literary Award for Lesbian Fiction.

He married Catherine Aitchison (née Compton) in August 1869; they had one daughter.

Ellen Codrington, the younger of the two daughters from Henry Codrington's first marriage, married in 1878 John Roche Dasent, the eldest son of George Webbe Dasent, the translator of Norse mythology.

Anne Codrington, his eldest daughter married Henry Finch-Hatton, later 13th Earl of Winchilsea in 1882, had issues include Guy Finch-Hatton, 14th Earl of Winchilsea, who married wealthy American heiress and the big-game hunter Denys Finch-Hatton.

== See also ==
- O'Byrne, William Richard (1849). "Codrington, Henry John" . A Naval Biographical Dictionary . John Murray – via Wikisource.

== Sources ==
- Heathcote, Tony (2002). The British Admirals of the Fleet 1734–1995. Pen & Sword. ISBN 0-85052-835-6.

Military offices
Preceded by Montagu Stopford	Admiral Superintendent, Malta Dockyard; 1858–1863	Succeeded by Horatio Austin
Preceded by Sir William Martin	Commander-in-Chief, Plymouth; 1869–1872	Succeeded by Sir Henry Keppel
