= HMS Howe (1815) =

Ship of the line of the Royal Navy

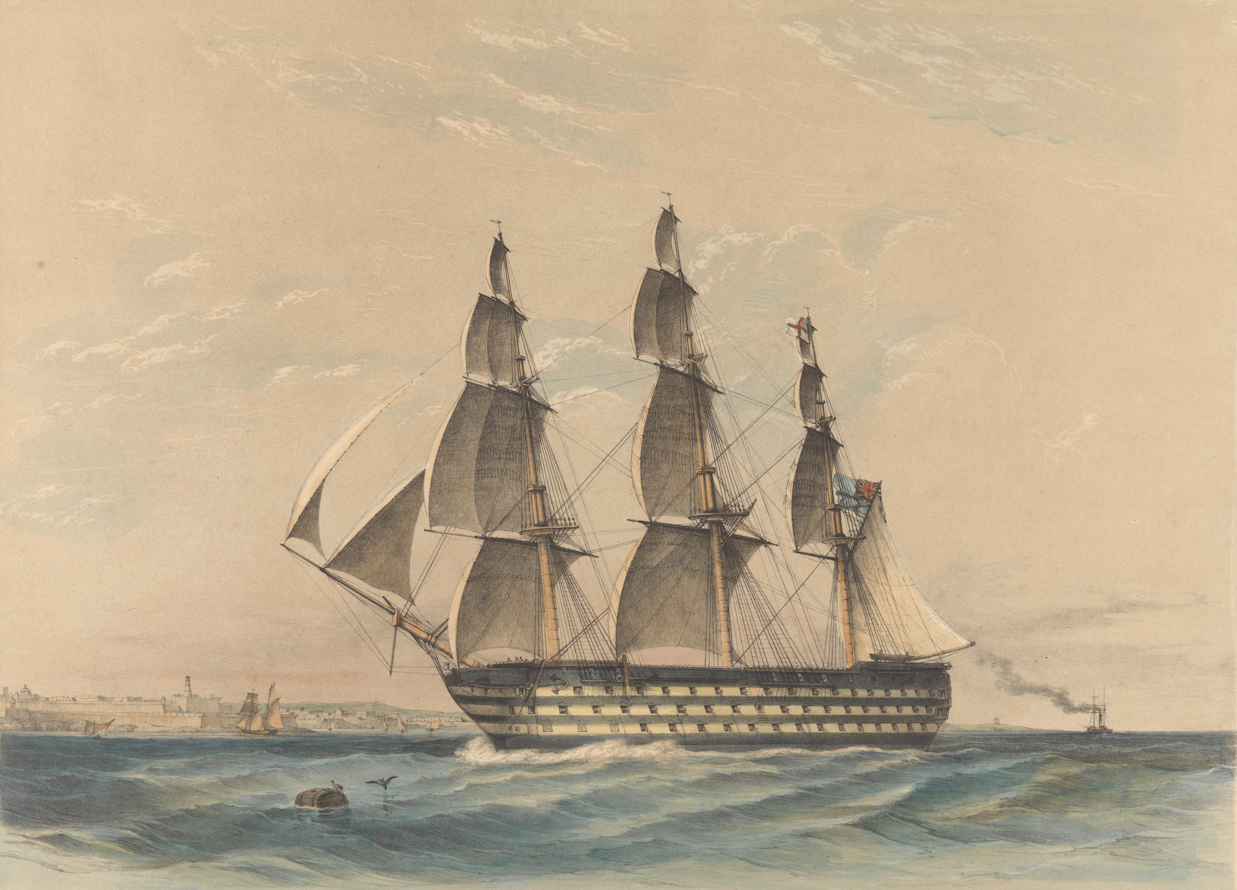
- HMS Howe entering the harbor at Malta, 1843

History

United Kingdom
- Name: Howe
- Ordered: 15 January 1806
- Builder: Chatham Dockyard
- Laid down: June 1808
- Launched: 28 March 1815
- Fate: Broken up, 1854

General characteristics
- Class & type: Nelson-class ship of the line
- Tons burthen: 2619 bm
- Length: 205 ft (62 m) (gundeck)
- Beam: 53 ft 8.75 in (16.3767 m)
- Depth of hold: 24 ft (7.3 m)
- Propulsion: Sails
- Sail plan: Full-rigged ship
- Armament: 120 guns: Gundeck: 32 × 32 pdrs; Middle gundeck: 34 × 24 pdrs; Upper gundeck: 34 × 18 pdrs; Quarterdeck: 6 × 12 pdrs, 10 × 32 pdr carronades; Forecastle: 2 × 32 pdr carronades

HMS Howe was a 120-gun, first-rate Nelson-class ship of the line built for the Royal Navy during the 1810s, launched on 28 March 1815 at Chatham.

Howe was broken up in 1854.
