= Princes Channel Wreck =

Elizabethan shipwreck

The Princes Channel wreck, also known as the Gresham Ship, is an Elizabethan shipwreck (c. 1574) that was discovered in the Princes Channel in the Thames Estuary. It was discovered by the Port of London Authority in 2004 during a dredging operation to remove obstructions that posed hazards and impeded navigation during low tides (Auer, J. and Firth, A.).

== Archaeological remains ==
20% of the wreck was recovered and lifted from the Thames Estuary, excavated and recovered by Wessex Archaeology. It was then taken to Horsea Island, an estuarine lake near Portsmouth so it could be preserved. A five-year research project ("The Gresham Ship Project"), was carried out from 2007 to 2012 by researchers from University College London and the University of Southern Denmark. The project focused on five large sections of the hull that had been recovered, as well as associated artefacts. The hull timbers are now a major exhibit at the UK National Dive Centre at Stoney Cove.

The design and construction of the Princes Channel Wreck is of Archaeological significance, as it appears to have been rebuilt using the method of furring, which allowed the vessel to gain about 1 foot in width on each side. The rebuilding may have been necessary if the ship was crank-sided.

== Naming ==
There has been debate as to the preliminary naming of the wreck, as it was found in the Princes Channel at the mouth of the Thames estuary. However the more popular name of Gresham Ship was introduced when the guns on board the vessel revealed a grasshopper insignia, which was the motif made by Sir Thomas Gresham, founder of the Royal Exchange.
