= HMS Britannia (1820) =

Ship of the line of the Royal Navy

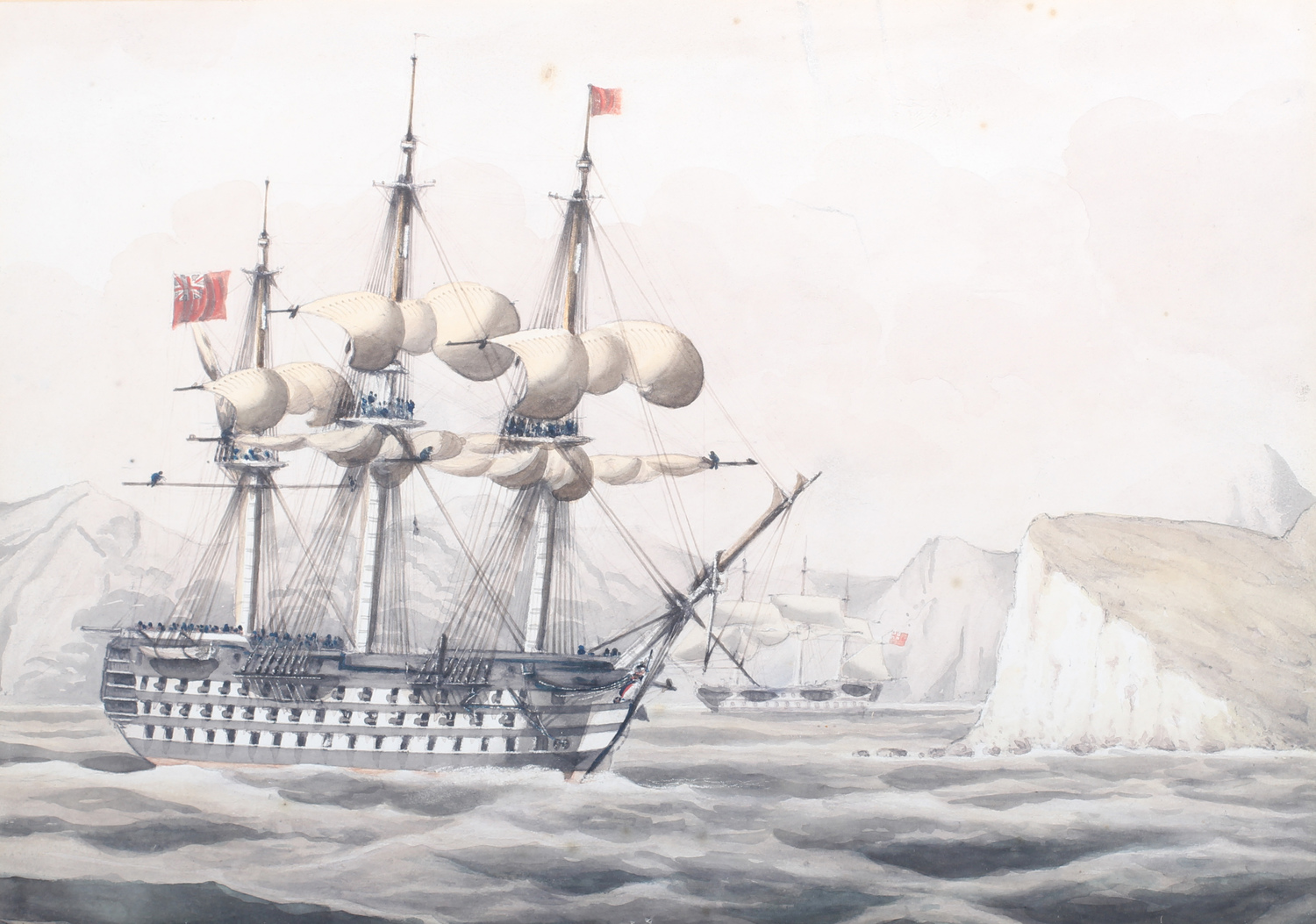
- Watercolor of HMS Britannia, c. 1834, by John H. Wilson

History

Royal NavyUnited Kingdom
- Name: Britannia
- Ordered: 6 January 1812
- Builder: HM Dockyard, Devonport
- Laid down: December 1813
- Launched: 20 October 1820
- Completed: 20 December 1820
- Commissioned: 4 October 1823
- Fate: Broken up by 20 November 1869

General characteristics (as built)
- Class & type: Caledonia-class ship of the line
- Tons burthen: 2616 15/94 bm
- Length: 205 ft (62.5 m) (gundeck)
- Beam: 54 ft 7 in (16.6 m)
- Draught: 18 ft 7 in (5.7 m)
- Depth of hold: 23 ft 2 in (7.1 m)
- Sail plan: Full-rigged ship
- Complement: 900 (wartime)
- Armament: 120 guns: Lower gundeck: 32 × 32 pdr guns; Middle gundeck: 34 × 24 pdr guns; Upper gundeck: 34 × 24 pdr Congreve guns; Quarterdeck: 6 × 12 pdr guns, 10 × 32 pdr carronades; Forecastle: 2 × 12 pdrs, 2 × 32 pdr carronades

HMS Britannia was a three-deck, 120-gun, first-rate Caledonia-class ship of the line built for the Royal Navy (RN). Completed in 1820 she was not commissioned until 1823 when she became a flagship at Plymouth. The ship remained there until 1829 when she became flagship of the Mediterranean Fleet. Britannia was often a flagship wherever she was assigned. She became a private ship in 1852 in the Mediterranean Fleet and participated in the Bombardment of Sevastopol during the Crimean War of 1854–1855 with the Russian Empire. Britannia returned home the following year and was converted into a hospital ship. She became a training ship for naval cadets in 1859 and was broken up ten years later.

== Description ==
The Caledonia class was an improved version of HMS Hibernia with additional freeboard to allow them to fight all their guns in heavy weather. Britannia measured 205 feet (62.5 m) on the gundeck and 170 feet 9 inches (52.0 m) on the keel. She had a beam of 54 feet 7 inches (16.6 m), a depth of hold of 23 feet 2 inches (7.1 m), a deep draught of 18 feet 7 inches (5.66 m) and had a tonnage of 261615/94 tons burthen. The ship was armed with 120 muzzle-loading, smoothbore guns that consisted of thirty-two 32-pounder (56 cwt) guns (Note: "Cwt" is the abbreviation for hundredweight, 56 cwt referring to the weight of the gun.) on her lower gundeck, thirty-four 24-pounder 49 cwt guns on her middle gundeck and thirty-six 24-pounder Congreve guns on her upper gundeck. Her forecastle mounted a pair of 12-pounder guns and two 32-pounder carronades. On her quarterdeck she carried six 12-pounders and ten 32-pounder carronades.

The ship was rearmed in 1840 with the 32-pounders on the lower gundeck replaced by thirty 56 cwt models and a pair of 60 cwt 68-pounder guns. The 24-pounders on the middle gundeck were exchanged for thirty-two 56 cwt 32-pounders and a pair of 60 cwt 68-pounders while the 24-pounders on the upper gun deck were replaced by 40 cwt 32-pounders. A dozen cwt 32-pounder carronades replaced all of the guns on the quarterdeck and forecastle received four 25 cwt 32-pounders. All the guns on the poop deck were removed.

== Construction and career ==
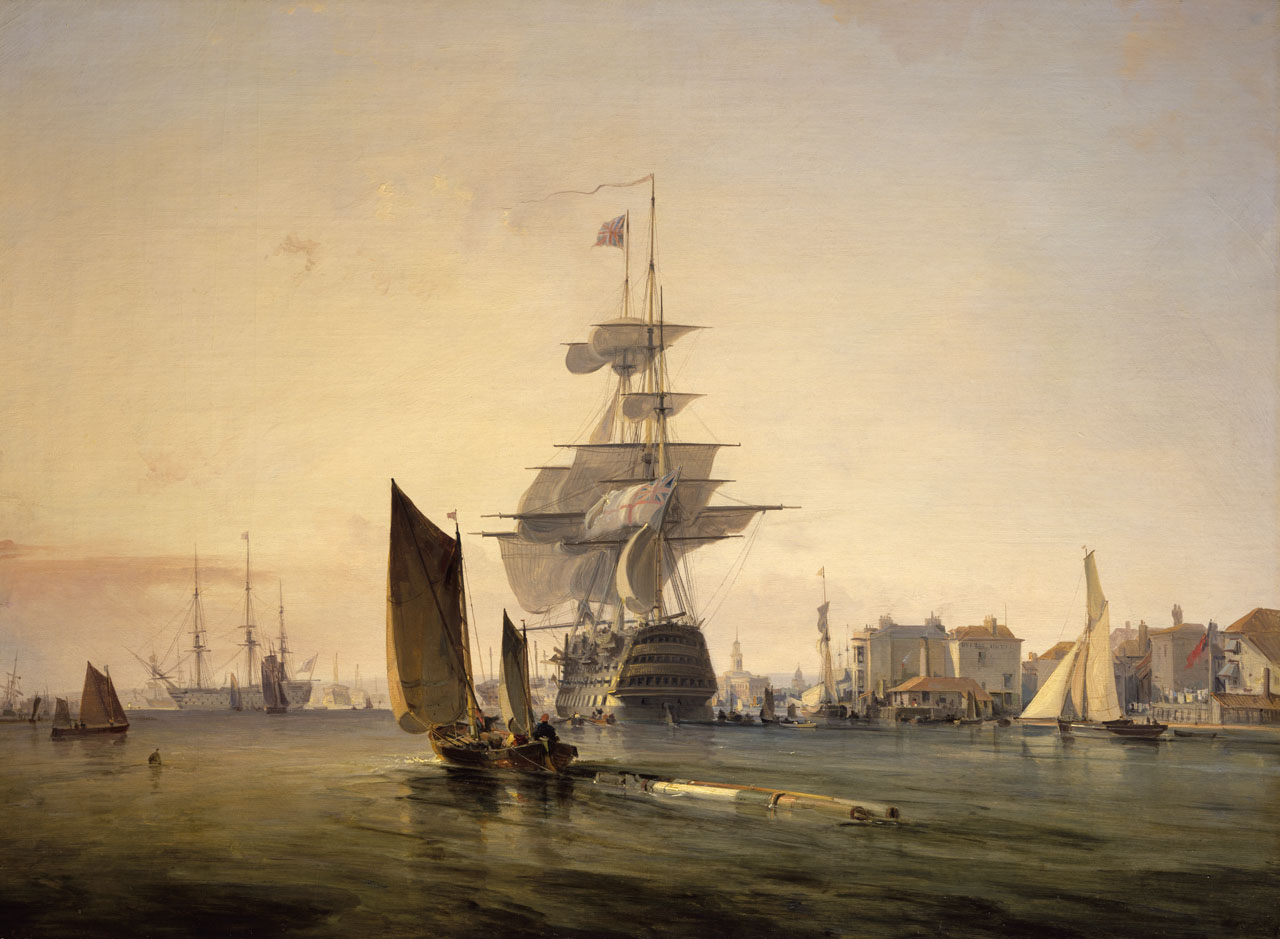
Britannia enters Portsmouth in 1835, George Chambers

Britannia was ordered on 6 January 1812, laid down at HM Dockyard, Plymouth in December 1813, launched on 20 October 1820 and completed on 20 December. The ship was not commissioned until 4 October 1823 when she became the flagship of the Commander-in-Chief, Plymouth, Admiral Sir Alexander Cochrane. Britannia remained there, serving as the flagship for the subsequent commanders-in-chief until 10 September 1829 when Vice-Admiral Pulteney Malcolm hoisted his flag aboard her as Commander-in-Chief, Mediterranean Fleet. She became a private ship on 27 October 1831 at Portsmouth, returning to the Mediterranean in 1835. The following year the ship became the flagship of Admiral Sir Philip Charles Durham, Commander-in-Chief, Portsmouth. Britannia resumed her former post as flagship of the Mediterranean Fleet in 1841. She was decommissioned in January 1843, before returning to service four years later.

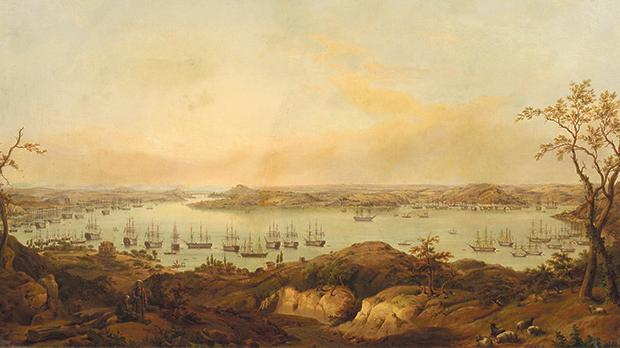
Britannia and the Allied Fleets anchored in the Bosphorus, late 1853; the prelude to the Crimean war. Giuseppe Schranz

The ship served as flagship of Admiral Sir James Deans Dundas. She was engaged in the Bombardment of Sebastopol on 17 October 1854 during the Crimean War and suffered nine crewmen wounded. On 14 November 1854, she was driven ashore on the Russian coast and was reported to have 5 feet (1.5 m) of water in her hold.

She returned to England at the beginning of 1855 and that year became a hospital ship at Portsmouth in July, then a cadet training ship on 1 January 1859. She was moved to Portland in 1862, then Dartmouth in 1863, where she served as residential barracks for cadets. She was finally sold for breaking up in 1869. Her place at Dartmouth was taken by HMS Prince of Wales, which was renamed Britannia for the role.
