= Furring =

Strips of material used to raise a surface; and the process of installing them

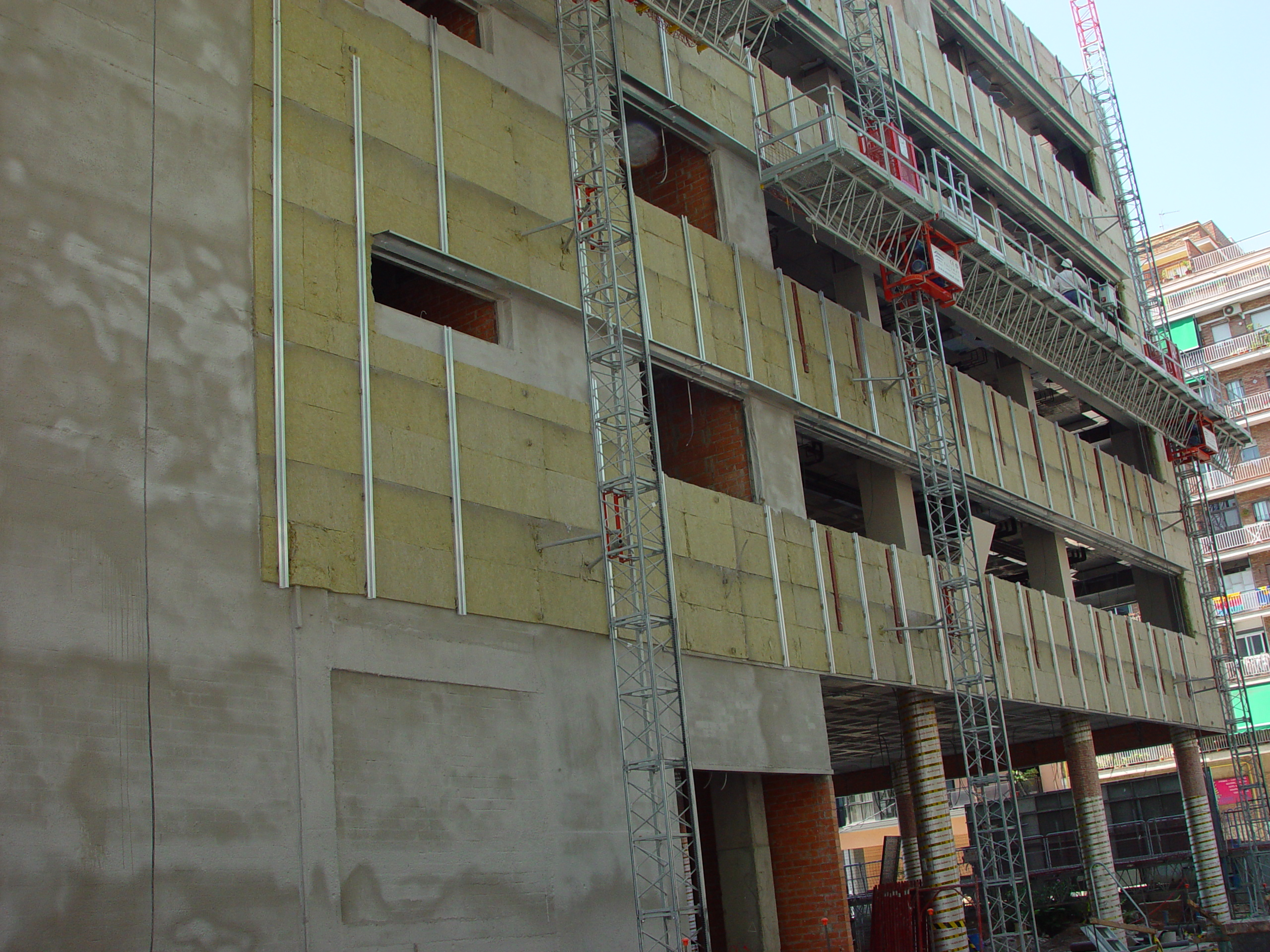
Vertical, metal furring is applied to the wall to create a channel and receive the siding material

In construction, furring (furring strips) are strips of wood or other material applied to a structure to level or raise the surface, to prevent dampness, to make space for insulation, to level and resurface ceilings or walls, or to increase the beam of a wooden ship. Furring refers to the process of installing the strips and to the strips themselves. Firring is a U.K. term for wood strips which are usually 50 mm wide, tapered and fixed above wood roof joists to provide drainage falls below roof boarding. Furring strips themselves are typically referred to as battens in the U.K. and sometimes the material is called strapping in the U.S.

== In buildings ==
Wood furring strips typically measure 1 x 2 or 1 x 3 inches. They can be laid out perpendicular to studs or joists and nailed to them, or set vertically against an existing wall surface. The spacing between the strips depends on the type of finishing material. Wider spacing is typically used behind the heavy boards that support ceramic tiles. Closely spaced strips are needed for thin panelling or plaster. The use of strips with plaster, however, is called either lath and plaster or wattle and daub. The origin of the furring strip may be from the root "furr", which is the term given to the space behind the field of lath.

Metal furring strips are used for commercial projects, or in towns where fire-proof supporting elements are required by the local building code. Often called "hat channels" to describe the profile (cross section), they consist of two flanges on each side of a trapezoid shape, 7/8 in thick.

Furring is also used to support roof materials and may be seen under barn and shed roofs but is now used less often, replaced by labor-saving plywood. Drywall has become the most common interior wall finishing material and does not need furring due to its strength. Furring is still used in remodeling work to fill out uneven sections for resurfacing, or to add room for insulation.

== Ship repair ==
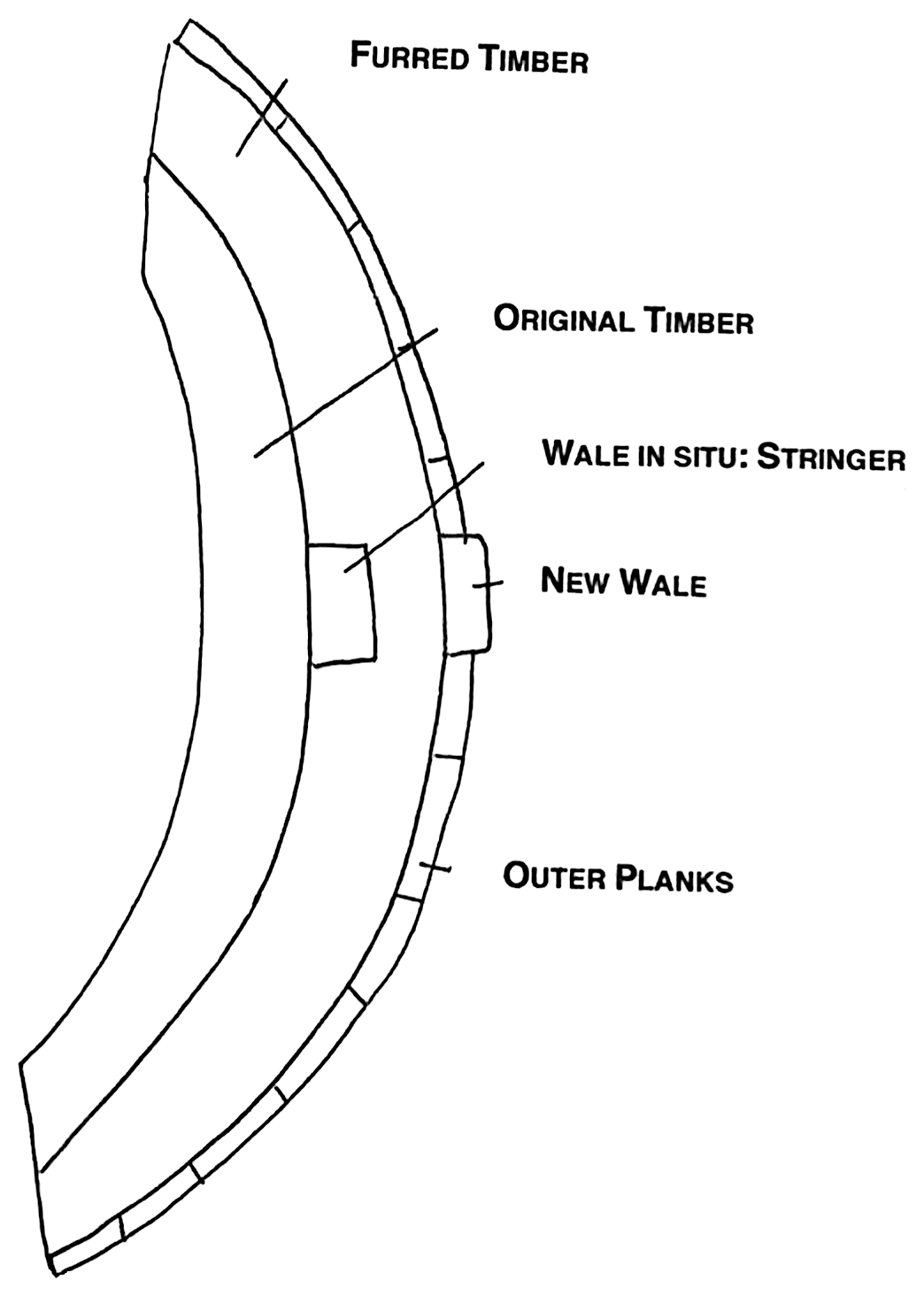

Furring is a type of ship rebuilding method indicative of the late 16th century and early 17th century England. It was adopted as a remedial process to solve crank ships that were built too narrow. When a ship could not bear sail, was too narrow or its bearing laid too low, a second layer of frames was attached outboard of the first to make it broader and lay its bearing higher. This was done by ripping the planks off and applying the second frames on top of the original frames, and then adding the planks back on. "They commonly fur some two or three strakes under water and as much above, according as the ship requires, more or less." (Mainwaring, 153) This would increase beam at and near the waterline, and thereby the transverse stability of the hull.

Although this appeared to have fixed the problems with "makeshift corrections" due to miscalculation, it was seen as a poor remedy and at times was used as a black listing method among shipwrights during the end of the 16th century and beginning of the 17th century England (ex. Phineas Pett and the Prince Royal).

Because it was seen as such an incompetent occurrence to miscalculate while building, even the writers of the time had plenty to say about its uncertainties: "I think in all the world there are not so many ships furred as are in England, and it is a pity that there is no order taken either for the punishing of those who build such ships or the preventing of it, for it is an infinite loss to the owners and an utter spoiling and disgrace to all ships that are so handled (Mainwaring, 153)".

The only archaeological evidence of furring found to date is on the Princes Channel Wreck.

== See also ==
- Henry Mainwaring – English naval officer, lawyer, and pirate (1587–1653)
- Mathew Baker – English shipwright
- Thomas Harriot – English astronomer, mathematician, ethnographer and translator
