= Nelson-class ship of the line =

1814 class of British first-rate ships of the line

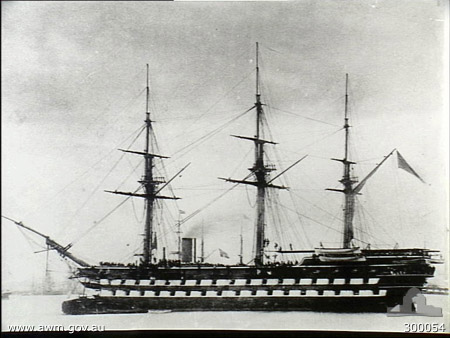
- Nelson in Williamstown, Victoria, before 1878

Class overview
- Name: Nelson
- Operators: Royal Navy
- Preceded by: Caledonia class
- Succeeded by: HMS Trafalgar
- Built: 1808–1815
- In service: 4 July 1814–1898
- Completed: 3
- Scrapped: 3

General characteristics
- Type: First-rate ship of the line
- Tons burthen: 2,601 4/94 (bm)
- Length: 205 ft (62.5 m) (gun deck); 170 ft 10 1/8 in (52.1 m) (keel)
- Beam: 53 ft 6 in (16.3 m)
- Depth of hold: 24 ft (7.3 m)
- Sail plan: Full-rigged ship
- Crew: 875 officers and ratings
- Armament: 120 muzzle-loading, smoothbore guns: Lower gun deck: 32 × 32 pdr guns; Middle gun deck: 34 × 24 pdr guns; Upper gun deck: 34 × 18 pdr guns; Quarterdeck: 6 × 12 pdr guns, 10 × 32 pdr carronades; Forecastle: 2 × 12 pdrs, 2 × 32 pdr carronades; Poop deck: 6 × 18 pdr carronades

General characteristics (Nelson, as converted)
- Displacement: 3,158 long tons (3,209 t)
- Tons burthen: 2,736 (bm)
- Length: 216 ft 3 in (65.9 m) (gun deck)
- Beam: 54 ft 6 in (16.6 m)
- Draught: 21 ft 10 in (6.7 m)
- Depth of hold: 24 ft 3 in (7.39 m)
- Installed power: boilers; 2,102 ihp (1,567 kW)
- Propulsion: 1 shaft; 1 HRCR steam engine
- Speed: 11.5 knots (21.3 km/h; 13.2 mph)
- Crew: 850
- Armament: Lower gun deck: 32 × 8 in shell guns; Upper gun deck: 34 × 32 pdr guns; Forecastle & Quarterdeck: 22 × 32 pdr guns, 1 × 68 pdr gun

The Nelson class consisted of three 120-gun, first-rate ships of the line built for the Royal Navy during the 1810s, Nelson, St Vincent, and Howe. The ships spent the bulk of their service in ordinary or on secondary duties like stationary flagships for various administrative positions. Nelson spent her entire career in various ports and never saw active duty at sea. She was the only one of the sisters to be converted to steam power. After her conversion in 1860, she became a training ship in 1867 for the government of Victoria, Australia, and was sold out of service in 1898. The ship was subsequently hulked and was eventually sold for scrap in 1928. Howe served with the Mediterranean Fleet in 1840–1843 and again in 1847–1850. The ship was broken up in 1854.

St Vincent served as the flagship for the Mediterranean Fleet in 1831–1834. She next saw active duty when she was assigned to participate in comparative sailing trials in the Experimental Squadrons in 1844–1846. The ship participated in the Crimean War in 1854 when she served as a troopship. St Vincent became a training ship in 1862 and was sold for scrap in 1906.

== Design and description ==
Designed as a joint effort between the two co-Surveyors of the Navy, Robert Seppings and Joseph Tucker, the ships measured 205 feet (62.5 m) on the gun deck and 170 feet 10 inches (52.1 m) on the keel. They had a beam of 53 feet 6 inches (16.3 m), a depth of hold of 24 feet (7.3 m) and had a tonnage of 2,6014/94 tons burthen. Their crew numbered 875 officers and ratings. The ships had the usual three-masted full-ship rig and were undistinguished sailers, being very crank. Comparative trials with the Experimental Squadron in 1844–1846 showed that St. Vincent had a very slow roll, which made her a good gun platform.

The ships were armed with 120 muzzle-loading, smoothbore guns that consisted of thirty-two 32-pounder guns on the lower gun deck, thirty-four 24-pounder gun on the middle gun deck and thirty-four 18-pounder guns on the upper gun deck. Their forecastles mounted a pair of 12-pounder guns and two 32-pounder carronades. On their quarterdeck they carried six 12-pounders and ten 32-pounder carronades. Above the quarterdeck was the poop deck with half-a-dozen 18-pounder carronades.

By 1840, the surviving ships had been rearmed with thirty 32-pounders and two 8 in (203 mm) shell guns on the lower gun deck, thirty-two 32-pounders and two 8-inch shell guns on the middle gun deck and the upper gun deck. On the forecastle a pair of 32-pounders and two 32-pounder carronades while the quarterdeck had four 32-pounders and a dozen 32-pounder carronades.

=== Conversion of Nelson into a screw-propelled ship of the line ===
The naval arms race between France and Britain in steam-propelled ships of the line resumed after Crimean War ended in 1855. Based on the experience gained during the war, Captain Sir Baldwin Wake Walker, Surveyor of the Navy, favored converting first- and second-rate ships as they could accommodate the engines and their required coal better than smaller ships. He ordered Nelson to be razeed and converted into an 89-gun, two-deck, second rate in 1859 along the lines of London's very successful conversion. This involved lengthening the ship to 216 feet 3 inches (65.9 m) at the gun deck and 178 feet 7 inches (54.4 m) at the keel. Her beam increased to 54 feet 6 inches (16.6 m) and her depth of hold to 23 feet 3 inches (7.1 m). Her tonnage modestly increased to 2,736 tons burthen and she (displaced) 3,158 long tons (3,209 t). Nelson now had a draught of 17 feet 6 inches (5.3 m) forward and 21 feet 10 inches (6.7 m) aft.

The ship was fitted with a 500-nominal horsepower, two-cylinder, horizontal-return, connecting rod-steam engine. Her boilers provided enough steam to give the ship a speed of 11.5 knots (21.3 km/h; 13.2 mph) from 2,102 indicated horsepower (1,567 kW) during her sea trials in Stokes Bay on 21 June 1860, although her masts were not fitted, nor did Nelson have her stores aboard.

The lower gun deck armament of the converted ship consisted of thirty-two 8-inch (65 cwt) (Note: "Cwt" is the abbreviation for hundredweight, 65 cwt referring to the weight of the gun.) shell guns and the upper gun deck had thirty-four 32-pounders (56 cwt). The combined armament of the forecastle and quarterdeck totalled twenty-two 32-pounders (42 cwt) and a single 68-pounder (95 cwt) pivot gun.

When Nelson was transferred to Australia in 1867 as a training ship, she was rearmed with a pair of 7-inch (178 mm) and twenty 64-pounder rifled muzzle-loading guns. The ship was also equipped with twenty 32-pounders.

== Ships ==
Construction data
Ship	Builder	Ordered	Laid down	Launched	Completed	Fate
Nelson	HM Dockyard, Woolwich	23 November 1805	December 1809	4 July 1814	17 August 1814	Scrapped, 1928
St Vincent	HM Dockyard, Plymouth	15 January 1806	May 1810	11 March 1815	1815	Sold for scrap, 15 May 1906
Howe	HM Dockyard, Chatham	15 January 1806	June 1808	28 March 1815	1815	Scrapped by 23 February 1854

== Service history ==
The only time that Nelson used her sails before she was converted into a steam-propelled ship of the line was when she sailed to Portsmouth to be placed in ordinary in 1814. The ship received a "Very Large Repair" between October 1825 and September 1828 during which she was roofed over fore and aft and had her hull "doubled" by adding an extra layer of wood. The doubling was removed in September 1837. Nelson was refitted as an "Advanced ship" in April–June 1846 so she could be activated more quickly, which meant that all of her guns were aboard and more of her masts were fitted; the rest of her rigging and stores were in a designated warehouse.

Walker ordered Nelson to be converted to steam power in February 1859 and she was completed in September 1860, the only ship launched before the end of the Napoleonic Wars in 1815 to be converted. The ship was immediately placed in ordinary until she was transferred to the colonial government of Victoria, Australia, in 1867 as a training ship. Nelson arrived in Port Phillip in February 1868 and was paid off in Melbourne later that month. The ship was cut down to a frigate in 1878 and sold as a storage hulk in 1898. She was resold as a coal hulk for Sydney and later transferred to Launceston, Tasmania, where she was broken up in 1928.

Howe was the first ship to be built incorporating Seppings' interlocking, diagonal bracing. Shen was placed in ordinary upon her completion in 1815 and was refitted at Sheerness Dockyard from September 1823 to April 1824. The ship was refitted again at Chatham from October 1832 to July 1833. She was commissioned in 1835 to serve as the flagship of Vice-Admiral Charles Fleeming, Commander-in-Chief, The Nore at Sheerness. Howe was assigned to the Mediterranean Fleet in 1840 and became the flagship of Rear-Admiral Sir Francis Mason, second-in-command of the fleet the following year. The ship returned home in 1843 and was placed in ordinary although she was designated as an "Advanced ship". Howe was recommissioned in 1847 and returned to the Mediterranean the following year, before returning home in 1850. The ship was in ordinary until 1853; her demolition at Sheerness was completed the following year.

Like her sister ships, St Vincent was placed in ordinary upon her completion. She had a "Very Small Repair" at Plymouth from June to October 1823 and was refitted to serve as a guard ship from September 1829 to May 1830. The ship was commissioned while the refit was in progress and briefly served as the flagship for Admiral Lord Northesk, Commander-in-Chief, Portsmouth and his successor Admiral Sir Thomas Foley. St Vincent became the flagship of Vice-Admiral Sir Henry Hotham, commander of the Mediterranean Fleet, in 1831 and returned home in 1834 and was placed back in ordinary. The ship had a "Small Repair" and was served as a demonstration flagship from 1839 to 1843. Admiral Sir Edward Codrington, the Commander-in-Chief, Portsmouth, hoisted his flag aboard the ship in 1841 and she served his successors in the same role until the end of 1848. During this time St Vincent was detached for several months each of the year from 1844 to 1846 to participate in sailing trials with the Experimental Squadrons. She had another "Very Small Repair" and was refitted to serve as an "Advance ship" from April 1849 to December 1851.

St Vincent was recommissioned in April 1854 to serve as the flagship of Rear-Admiral William Martin, Admiral Superintendent of HM Dockyard, Portsmouth. Two months later the ship transported French troops to the Baltic during the Crimean War. After the Battle of Bomarsund in August, she ferried Russian prisoners back to Britain. In February 1858 St Vincent became the flagship of Rear-Admiral George Grey, Admiral Superintendent at Portsmouth, while also serving as a depot ship for the Reserve fleet. She became a boys' training ship at the beginning of 1862 and continued on that duty until she was sold for scrap in 1906. The ship arrived at Falmouth later that year to begin demolition.
