= Lion-class battleship =

Planned class of battleships for the Royal Navy

Class overview
- Name: Lion-class battleship
- Operators: Royal Navy
- Preceded by: King George V class
- Succeeded by: HMS Vanguard
- Planned: 6
- Completed: 0
- Cancelled: 6

General characteristics (1938 design)
- Type: Fast battleship
- Displacement: 40,550 long tons (41,200 t) (standard); 46,400 long tons (47,100 t) (deep load)
- Length: 780 ft (237.7 m) (waterline); 785 ft (239.3 m) (o/a)
- Beam: 105 ft (32 m)
- Draught: 33 ft 6 in (10.2 m) (deep load)
- Installed power: 8 × Admiralty 3-drum boilers; 130,000 shp (97,000 kW)
- Propulsion: 4 shafts; 4 × steam turbine sets
- Speed: 30 knots (56 km/h; 35 mph)
- Range: 14,000 nmi (26,000 km; 16,000 mi) at 10 knots (19 km/h; 12 mph)
- Complement: 1,680
- Armament: 3 × triple 16 in (406 mm) guns; 8 × twin 5.25 in (133 mm) DP guns; 6 × octuple 2-pdr (40 mm) AA guns
- Armour: Belt: 6–14.7 in (152–373 mm); Deck: 2.5–6 in (64–152 mm); Barbettes: 12–15 in (305–381 mm); Gun turrets: 7–15 in (178–381 mm); Conning tower: 3–4.5 in (76–114 mm); Bulkheads: 4–12 in (102–305 mm)

General characteristics (1942 design)
- Displacement: 42,550 long tons (43,230 t) (standard); 48,890 long tons (49,670 t) (deep load)
- Length: 780 ft (237.7 m) (waterline); 793 ft (241.7 m) (o/a)
- Beam: 108 ft (32.9 m)
- Draught: 34 ft 3 in (10.4 m) (deep load)
- Installed power: 130,000 shp (97,000 kW); 8 × Admiralty 3-drum boilers
- Propulsion: 4 shafts; 4 × steam turbine sets
- Speed: 28.25 knots (52.32 km/h; 32.51 mph)
- Range: 16,500 nmi (30,600 km; 19,000 mi) at 10 knots (19 km/h; 12 mph)
- Complement: 1,750
- Armament: 3 × triple 16 in guns; 8 × twin 5.25 in DP guns; 9 × octuple, 1 × quadruple 2-pdr AA guns
- Armour: Belt: 6–14.7 in (152–373 mm); Deck: 2.5–6 in (64–152 mm); Barbettes: 12–15 in (305–381 mm); Gun turrets: 7–15 in (178–381 mm); Conning tower: 3–4.5 in (76–114 mm); Bulkheads: 4–12 in (102–305 mm)

The Lion class was a class of six fast battleships designed for the Royal Navy (RN) in the late 1930s. They were a larger, improved version of the preceding King George V class, with 16-inch (406 mm) guns. Only two ships were laid down before the Second World War began in September 1939 and a third was ordered during the war, but their construction was suspended shortly afterwards. The design was modified in light of war experience in 1942, but the two ships already begun were scrapped later in the year.

None of the other ships planned were laid down, although there was a proposal in 1941 to modify one of the suspended ships into a hybrid battleship-aircraft carrier with two 16-inch gun turrets and a flight deck. Preliminary work for a new design began in 1944 and continued for the next year or so until the RN realised that they were unaffordable in the post-war financial environment.

== Design and description ==
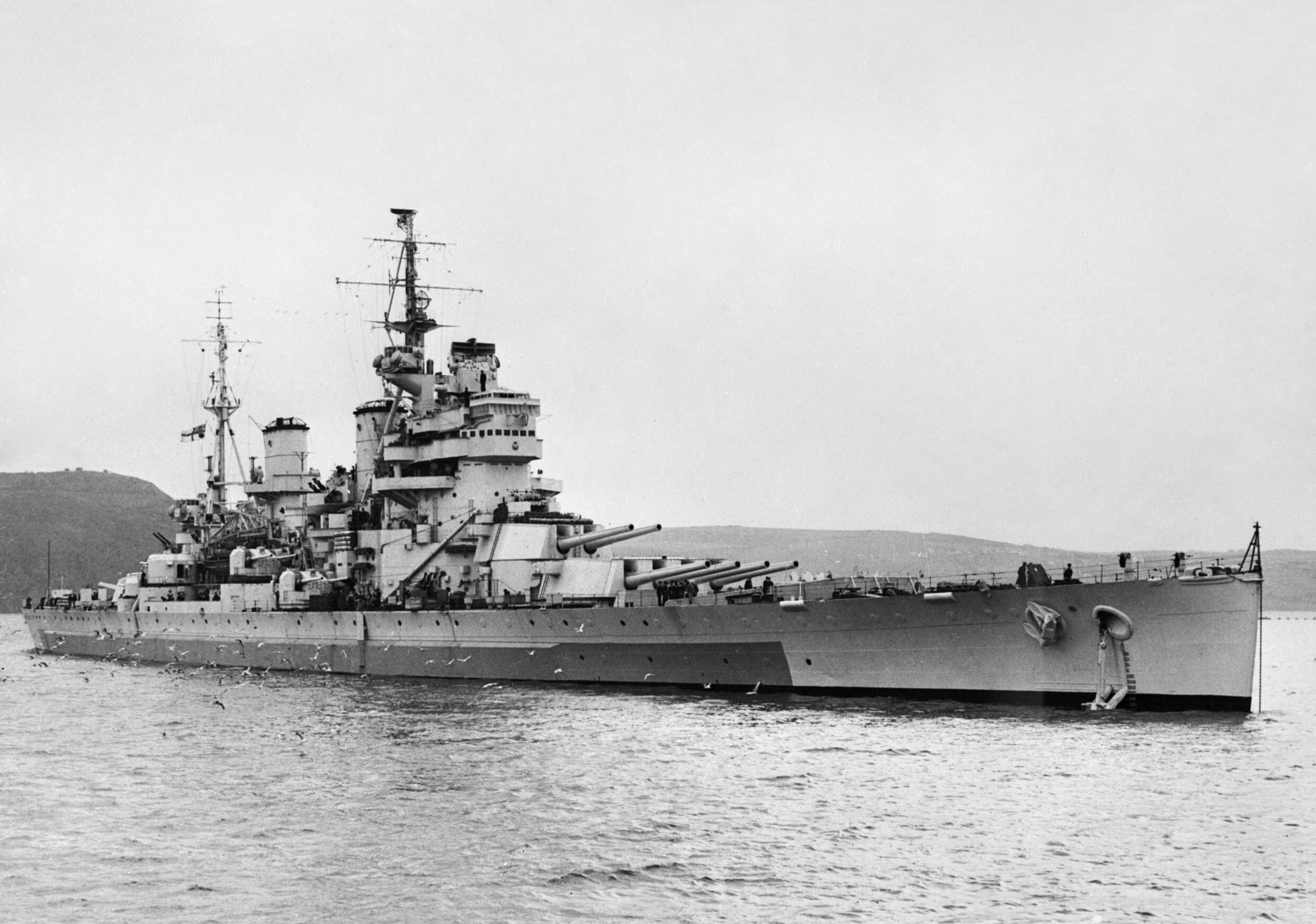
HMS Anson of the King George V class, which provided the basis for the Lion design

The design of the Lion-class battleships was influenced by the terms of several arms control treaties of the 1920s and 1930s. The Washington Naval Treaty of 1922 had banned new battleship construction, with certain specified exceptions, for a decade. The London Naval Treaty of 1930 extended the ban for five more years, which meant that almost all the First World War-era ships would be eligible for replacement by the Washington Treaty's rules when the London Treaty expired. The British government intended for the 1935 Second London Naval Disarmament Conference to prevent a naval arms race that Britain could ill afford, but the Japanese refusal to sign the resulting Second London Naval Treaty of 1936 thwarted that hope. The three signatories, Britain, France and the United States had agreed to limit the size and gun calibre for the battleships that would be built by the signatories. They were restricted to 35,000 long tons (35,562 t) standard displacement and a main armament calibre of 14 inches (356 mm). This dictated the choice of the 14-inch gun for the main battery of the King George Vs (KGV). The treaty contained an "Escalator Clause" that would increase the maximum allowable calibre to 16 inches if the Japanese government failed to sign; this was triggered in April 1937.

As it was too late to modify the KGVs to avoid delays in construction, the Board of Admiralty then began preliminary design work on a 35,000-long-ton ship armed with 16-inch guns and it was promising enough that the Director of Naval Construction (DNC) was ordered to further investigate such designs. To save design time, many of the features of the KGVs were incorporated in the new design, but the limited size of the ship was a real challenge for the designers. Maintaining the same speed, protection, and secondary armament as the older ships while using 16-inch guns proved impossible while remaining within the treaty limits. In an effort to remain within treaty limits, the overall weight of armour was slightly reduced and two twin 5.25-inch (133 mm) gun turrets as well as aircraft and their facilities were eliminated.

The treaty-imposed design problems became irrelevant on 31 March 1938, when the signatories of the Treaty invoked the tonnage escalation clause because the Japanese refused to provide any information about their battleship construction programme and the signatories feared that their new ships could be outclassed by the new Japanese battleships. Due to limitations of docking facilities particularly at Rosyth and Portsmouth as well as costs, the Admiralty hoped to have the new limit at 40,000 long tons (40,642 t); the limit was eventually settled at 45,000 long tons (45,722 t) because the Americans would accept only that figure or none at all. The Admiralty in any case decided to limit itself to 40,000 long tons and nine 16-inch guns on the grounds that larger vessels would be unable to dock at the major Royal Navy dockyards at Rosyth or Portsmouth. A new design was prepared with more armour, more powerful machinery, the two twin 5.25-inch gun turrets restored, and four aircraft added. The Admiralty approved this design on 15 December and bids were solicited very shortly afterwards.

=== 1938 design ===
The 1938 version of the Lion class had a waterline length of 780 feet (237.7 m), an overall length of 785 feet (239.3 m), a beam of 105 feet (32 m), and a maximum draught of 33 feet 6 inches (10.2 m). They would have displaced 40,550 long tons (41,201 t) at standard load and 46,400 long tons (47,145 t) at deep load. The appearance of the Lions closely resembled that of the KGVs, but included a transom stern to improve steaming efficiency at high speed. The crew complement was estimated to be about 1,680 officers and ratings.

In the interests of saving time, the four-shaft unit machinery design from the KGVs was duplicated with alternating boiler and engine rooms. The Lion-class ships would have had four sets of geared Parsons steam turbine sets housed in separate engine rooms, each driving one propeller shaft. They were designed to produce a total of 130,000 shaft horsepower (97,000 kW) at overload condition and a speed of 30 knots (56 km/h; 35 mph). The turbines were intended to be powered by eight Admiralty three-drum boilers in four boiler rooms at a working pressure of 400 psi (2,758 kPa; 28 kgf/cm^{2}) and temperature of 700 °F (371 °C). The turbines and boilers could be cross-connected in an emergency. The ships were designed to carry 3,720 long tons (3,780 t) of fuel oil. Their maximum estimated range was 14,000 nautical miles (26,000 km; 16,000 mi) at a speed of 10 knots (19 km/h; 12 mph). They would have been equipped with six 330-kilowatt (440 hp) turbogenerators and two 330-kW diesel generators that supplied the common ring main at 220 volts.

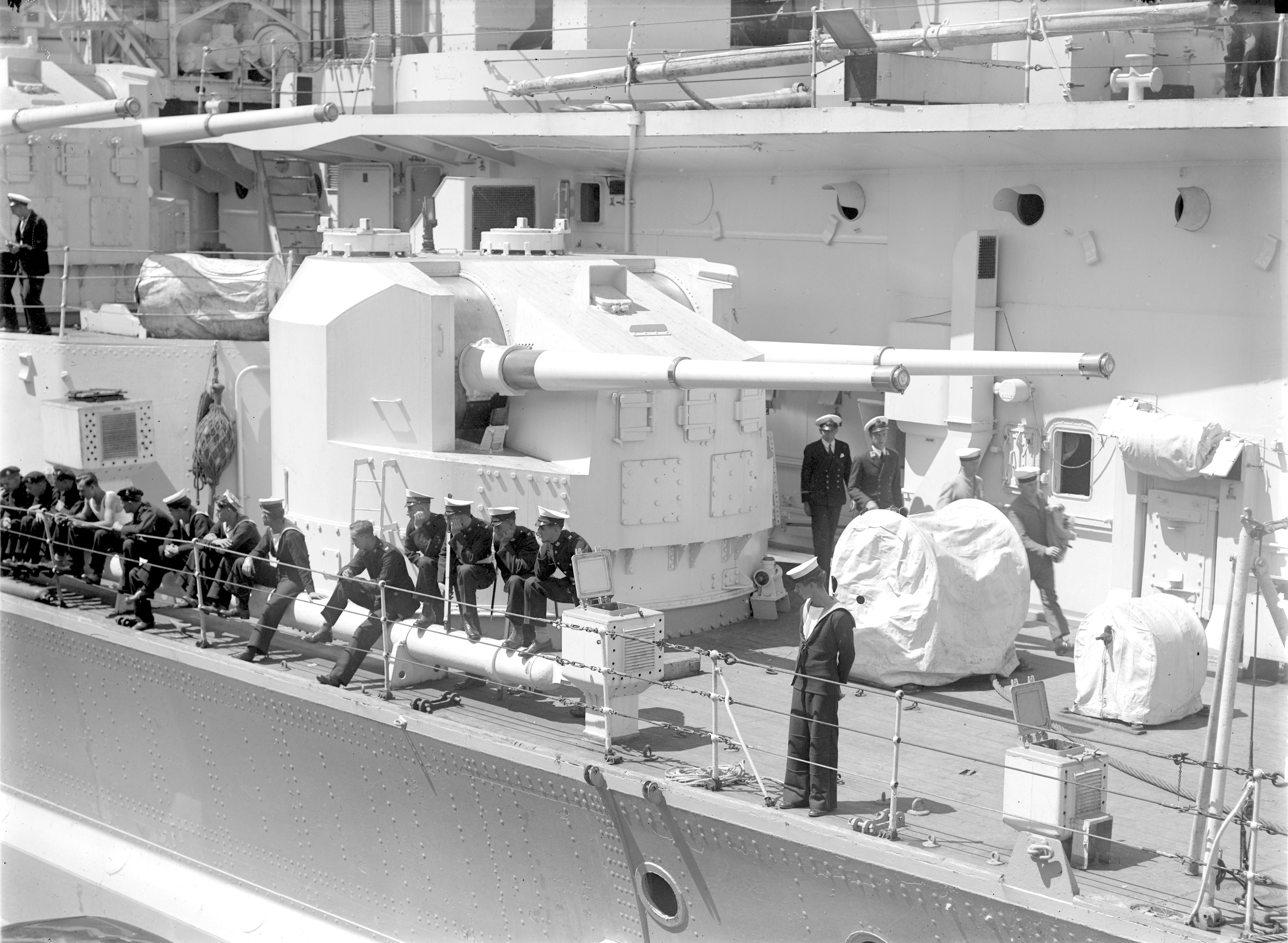
QF 5.25-inch Mark I turret on HMS King George V, which was identical to the secondary guns Lion would have carried

The Lion-class ships' main armament consisted of nine newly designed 45-calibre BL 16-inch Mark II guns in three hydraulically powered triple-gun turrets. The maximum elevation of the turrets was increased to +40° although the guns were loaded at +5°. They fired 2,375-pound (1,077 kg) projectiles at a muzzle velocity of 2,483 ft/s (757 m/s); this provided a maximum range of 40,560 yards (37,088 m). Their rate of fire was two rounds per minute and the ships carried 100 shells per gun. The secondary armament consisted of sixteen 50-calibre QF 5.25-inch Mk I dual-purpose guns in eight twin-gun mounts. They had a maximum depression of −5° and a maximum elevation of +70°. They fired an 80-pound (36 kg) high-explosive shell at a muzzle velocity of 2,672 ft/s (814 m/s). At maximum elevation, the guns had a maximum range of 24,070 yards (22,010 m). Their normal rate of fire was about 7–8 rounds per minute and 400 rounds were provided for each gun. Short-range air defence was provided by 48 QF 2-pounder "pom-pom" guns in six octuple mountings. The 2-pounder gun fired a 40-millimetre (1.6 in), 1.684-pound (0.764 kg) shell at a muzzle velocity of 2,400 ft/s (730 m/s) to a distance of 6,800 yards (6,200 m). The gun's rate of fire was approximately 96–98 rounds per minute and 1,800 rounds per gun were carried by the ships.

Their armour scheme was virtually identical to that of the KGVs. The waterline belt was intended to be made from Krupp cemented armour (KCA) 14.7 inches (373 mm) thick and was 433 feet (132 m) long. The main portion of the belt would have been 15 feet (4.6 m) high, but a lower strake, 8 feet 3 inches (2.5 m) high, extended an additional 40 feet (12.2 m) past the ends of the armoured citadel. It was intended to be tapered vertically from 14.7 inches in thickness to 5.5 inches (140 mm) at the bottom edge of the belt, while the plates at the end of the belt would have been only 11 inches (279 mm) thick at the top. Transverse bulkheads 10–12 inches (254–305 mm) thick would have closed off each end of the armoured citadel. At the aft end of the steering gear compartment would have been a 4-inch (100 mm) transverse bulkhead. The KCA face-plates of the main gun turrets were intended to be 15 inches thick and their roofs would have used 6-inch (152 mm) non-cemented armour plates. Their sides remained 7–10 inches (180–250 mm) in thickness. The barbettes for the 16-inch guns were intended to be 15 inches thick on the sides, tapering to 12–13.5 inches (305–343 mm) closer to the centreline of the ship.

Intended to resist the impact of a 1,000-pound (450 kg) armour-piercing bomb dropped from a height of 14,000 feet (4,300 m), the Lions' deck protection was identical to that of the KGV class. It consisted of 6-inch (152 mm) non-cemented armour over the magazines that reduced to 5 inches (127 mm) over the machinery spaces. The armour continued forward and aft of the citadel at the lower-deck level. Forward it tapered in steps from five inches down to 2.5 inches (64 mm) near the bow. Aft, it protected the steering gear and propeller shafts with 4.5–5 inches (114–127 mm) of armour. Unlike the Germans, French and Americans, the British no longer believed that heavy armour for the conning tower served any real purpose, given that the chance of hitting the conning tower was very small, and protected the forward conning tower with only 3–4.5 inches (76–114 mm) of armour.

The underwater protection, also virtually identical to that of the KGVs, would have consisted of a 13.25 ft (4 m) wide three-layer system of voids and liquid-filled compartments meant to absorb the energy of an underwater explosion. It was bounded on the inside by the 1.75-inch (44 mm) torpedo bulkhead. Both of the inner and outer voids were fitted with pumps to flood them with water to level the ship (counter-flood) in case she began to list. Over the length of the citadel, this system was found to be proof against 1,000 lb (450 kg) of TNT during full-scale trials. The Lion-class ships would have had a double bottom with a depth of 4 feet (1.2 m).

Naval historians William Garzke and Robert Dulin believe that the design of the Lion class would have corrected some of the deficiencies of the KGVs with the notable exceptions of the too-shallow torpedo protection system, caused by limits of the existing infrastructure, and the limited endurance, both of which were addressed in the revised 1942 design. Their 16-inch main battery, although not the most powerful in the world, were superior to the earlier guns used in the Nelson-class battleships, and they "would have been the most powerful and fastest battleships to have served in the Royal Navy."

=== 1942 design ===
Construction was suspended shortly after the war began and the Admiralty took advantage of the time to refine the design in light of war experience in late 1941. The beam was increased to 108 feet (32.9 m), the maximum width allowed by the locks of the Panama Canal, to increase the depth and effectiveness of the ships' torpedo protection system, and almost 1,100 long tons (1,100 t) of fuel oil were added to increase the ship's endurance. The beam increase meant that many of the Royal Navy home docking facilities, including Rosyth and Portsmouth, could no longer accommodate these ships. The requirement that 'A' turret had to be able to fire directly ahead at 0° elevation was rescinded as it radically reduced freeboard forward and caused the KGVs to take a lot of water over the bow in head seas. To partially compensate for the additional weight, the belt armour was reduced in thickness by 1 inch (25 mm) to 13.7 inches (350 mm) except over the magazines, and the aircraft and their facilities were removed. The space in the superstructure freed up by these changes was used to increase the light anti-aircraft armament to nine octuple and one quadruple 2-pounder mounts.

The overall length of the Lion class increased to 793 feet (241.7 m) and the displacement grew to 42,550 long tons (43,233 t) at standard load and 47,650 long tons (48,415 t) at deep load. No changes were made to the propulsion machinery, so the speed decreased to 28.25 knots (52.32 km/h; 32.51 mph) because of the greater displacement. The 4,800 long tons (4,877 t) of fuel increased their endurance to an estimated maximum of 16,500 nautical miles (30,600 km; 19,000 mi) at a speed of 10 knots. The freeboard forward was increased by nearly 9 feet (2.7 m), and the radar suite was increased to match that of the battleship Vanguard, then under construction. Because the light cruiser Belfast lost all steam power when she struck a mine early in the war, two diesel generators were substituted for two turbo-generators. The extra beam was used to increase the depth of the torpedo protection system amidships from 13.25 ft to 15 feet (4.6 m). The ships' crew was estimated at 1,750 officers and ratings.

=== 1944 design ===
The RN's Plans Division set a requirement for a dozen battleships for the post-war navy and the DNC began another design in February 1944 that would incorporate wartime lessons, but they soon concluded that "the power of modern weapons had increased so much that ever-increasing armour and torpedo protection was required until it became incompatible with the limited offensive power of the ship." The main armament was revised to an improved Mk IV version of the 16-inch gun in a new Mk III turret that fired a heavier shell at a marginally lower velocity, mounted in three triple turrets. They would also carry twelve twin QF 4.5-inch (114 mm) Mk V guns as their secondary armament and one twin and ten sextuple Bofors mounts plus fifty 20 mm Oerlikons for anti-aircraft protection. Calculations for a preliminary sketch design were completed in October and revealed a 26-knot (48 km/h; 30 mph), 50,400-long-ton (51,209 t) ship at standard load and 60,700 long tons (61,674 t) at deep load. More detailed studies were conducted in January 1945 and showed that the ship would actually displace 59,850 long tons (60,810 t) at standard load and 69,500 long tons (70,615 t) deep. This design was too large, so multiple variants were considered over the next several months, examining the effects of reducing side armour, underwater protection and the number of main and secondary gun turrets. The provisional staff requirements were issued in March and increased the speed to 29 knots (54 km/h; 33 mph) and set the endurance equal to that of the original design, which was slightly modified in April as 'Design B'. This greatly hampered the ability of the designers to reduce the size of the design as only those variants with two main gun turrets were below 55,500 long tons (56,391 t) at standard displacement. The most radical variant, christened 'Design X', had an armour arrangement similar to the modernised battlecruiser Renown with a pair of 16-inch and eight 4.5-inch turrets and had only minimal underwater protection, relying on tight compartmentalisation and strengthened internal bulkheads to localise damage. This yielded a 36,800-long-ton (37,391 t) ship at standard load.

That same month a committee headed by Rear-Admiral Reginald Servaes reviewed all the proposals and the Admiralty requested a sketch design of 'X' with two 16-inch turrets, both forward of the superstructure as in the French Richelieu class, and a thicker waterline belt in May that the DNC designated 'X3'. This displaced 45,350 long tons (46,078 t) at standard load. The following month the Admiralty asked that the 16-inch turrets be replaced by quadruple 15-inch (381 mm) turrets and the DNC replied that no design work had been done on such turrets and would thus delay construction by 15 to 18 months and add about 2,000 long tons (2,032 t) to the ship's displacement. The DNC asked permission to investigate further methods of reducing the size of 'B3' in July and work continued on both designs through October. By this time the impossibility of even maintaining the existing battle fleet, much less building such large battleships, had become clear in light of Britain's economic difficulties and further design work was informally suspended on all but the new Mk IV gun and its Mk III turret; this was finally cancelled by the First Sea Lord on 10 March 1949.

=== Hybrid aircraft carrier ===
On 8 January 1941, Rear-Admiral Bruce Fraser, Third Sea Lord and Controller of the Navy, asked the DNC to work up a hybrid aircraft carrier based on the Lion-class hull. Two months later, a sketch design was presented for consideration, but it was not well regarded by the participants. This design retained all three main gun turrets and the flight deck was deemed too short to be useful. A revised version with only the two forward turrets retained was requested and was ready in July. In this design, the displacement ranged from 44,750 long tons (45,470 t) at standard load and 51,000 long tons (52,000 t) at deep load. The design's dimensions included a waterline length of 800 feet (243.8 m), a beam of 115 feet (35.1 m) and a draught of 29 feet 6 inches (8.99 m). The flight deck was 500 feet (152.4 m) long and had a width of 73 feet (22.3 m). The machinery was unchanged, but another 600 long tons (610 t) of oil increased her endurance to 14,750 nautical miles (27,320 km; 16,970 mi) at 10 knots. The hybrid's armament consisted of six 16-inch guns in two triple turrets, sixteen 5.25-inch guns and eight octuple 2-pounder mounts. Twelve fighters and two torpedo bombers could be carried. The Director of Naval Gunnery's assessment was that "The functions and requirements of carriers and of surface gun platforms are entirely incompatible ... the conceptions of these designs ... is evidently the result of an unresolved contest between a conscious acceptance of aircraft and a subconscious desire for a 1914 Fleet ... these abortions are the results of a psychological maladjustment. The necessary readjustments should result from a proper re-analysis of the whole question, what would be a balanced fleet in 1945, 1950 or 1955?" The design was rejected.

== Construction ==
Six Lion-class ships were planned, two each in the 1938, 1939, and 1940 Naval Programmes. The first pair, Lion and Temeraire, were ordered on 28 February 1939 from Vickers Armstrongs and Cammell Laird, respectively. Lion was laid down at Vickers' Walker, Newcastle upon Tyne shipyard on 4 July; Temeraire preceded her at Birkenhead on 1 June. The contract for Conqueror was awarded on 15 August to John Brown, and that of Thunderer was scheduled for 15 November for Fairfield. After the start of the Second World War in September, construction continued desultorily until early October, when it was suspended by the Admiralty for one year; construction of the 16-inch guns and their turrets was to continue. The second pair of Lions were now expected to be laid down in January and April 1941. On 15 November 1939, work on Lion and Temeraire was authorised to resume whenever there was available labour, but it was suspended again in May 1940. In November, the decision to suspend construction was reaffirmed and steel from Lion was ordered transferred to Vanguard. After thoroughly revising the design in late 1942, the RN's Director of Contracts wrote to Vickers Armstrongs and Cammell Laird "requesting them to clear the slipways and reuse the material on other naval contracts where possible". All design work ceased in April 1943 and armour plates made for Lion were to be scrapped. Only four 16-inch guns, and no turrets, were ever completed. One of the guns was used to test aspects of the Mk IV gun.

== Bibliography ==
- Brown, David K. (2006). Nelson to Vanguard: Warship Design and Development 1923–1945. London: Chatham Publishing. ISBN 978-1-59114-602-5.
- Campbell, John (1985). Naval Weapons of World War II. Annapolis, Maryland: Naval Institute Press. ISBN 978-0-87021-459-2.
- Friedman, Norman (2015). The British Battleship 1906–1946. Barnsley, UK: Seaforth Publishing. ISBN 978-1-84832-225-7.
- Garzke, William H. Jr.; Dulin, Robert O. Jr. (1980). British, Soviet, French, and Dutch Battleships of World War II. London: Jane's. ISBN 978-0-7106-0078-3.
- Johnston, Ian; Buxton, Ian (2013). The Battleship Builders: Constructing and Arming British Capital Ships. Barnsley, UK: Seaforth. ISBN 978-1-84832-093-2.
- Layman, R. D.; McLaughlin, Stephen (1991). The Hybrid Warship: The Amalgamation of Big Guns and Aircraft. Annapolis, Maryland: Naval Institute Press. ISBN 978-1-55750-374-9.
- Raven, Alan; Roberts, John (1976). British Battleships of World War Two: The Development and Technical History of the Royal Navy's Battleship and Battlecruisers from 1911 to 1946. Annapolis, Maryland: Naval Institute Press. ISBN 978-0-87021-817-0.
