= Crank-sided =

Crank is a condition in which a ship (especially a sailing ship) heels abnormally, and recovers slowly under the action of the wind. If a ship makes long, slow rolls and takes time resuming a vertical position, it is referred to as crank, cranky, crank-sided, tender, or tender-sided. If the ship snaps back to its vertical position when heeled, it is called ʻstiff.ʼ Stiffness refers to a ship's power to stand up to her canvas, and will offer great resistance to inclination from the upright, when under sail. Although stiff is considered good in the case of many ships, there are extreme cases in which the vessel will be too stiff and resist the tendency to heel under wind pressure, which may cause damage to masts, rigging, and structure. According to Arthur Nelson, “most new Tudor ships were affected slightly on completion, one way or the other."

The reason a ship may be crank cannot be summarized as one precise, underlying cause, but rather as anything that may affect the relationship of the centre of buoyancy and the centre of gravity to each other; essentially, anything that affects the ship's stability.

The stability of a ship will at any moment depend:

- on her external form and proportions
- on her immediate comparative displacement and depth of immersion
- on the momentary distribution of her weights, as affecting the position of her ʻcentre of gravityʼ

The summation of all the weights is an important aspect of the stability of a ship. Fixtures, fittings, masts, rigging, crew, ballast, etc., will affect a ship's stability based on their individual movements about the centreline of the ship. These weights will exert a downward force on the vertical centreline (imagining a line drawn through the centre of the ship and the metacentre is the point in the middle). The centre of the submerged part of the hull acts as an upward force on the vertical centreline, and so these two forces have to be balanced with the sea at the waterline of the ship when it is at rest.

By looking at the various weights, distributions and contributing factors that may affect its buoyancy, remedies can be attempted to solve what has affected the ship's stability. In the case of the Gresham Ship (1574), furring was the chosen method to solve its crankness.
