= Caledonia-class ship of the line =

1808 class of British Royal Navy ships

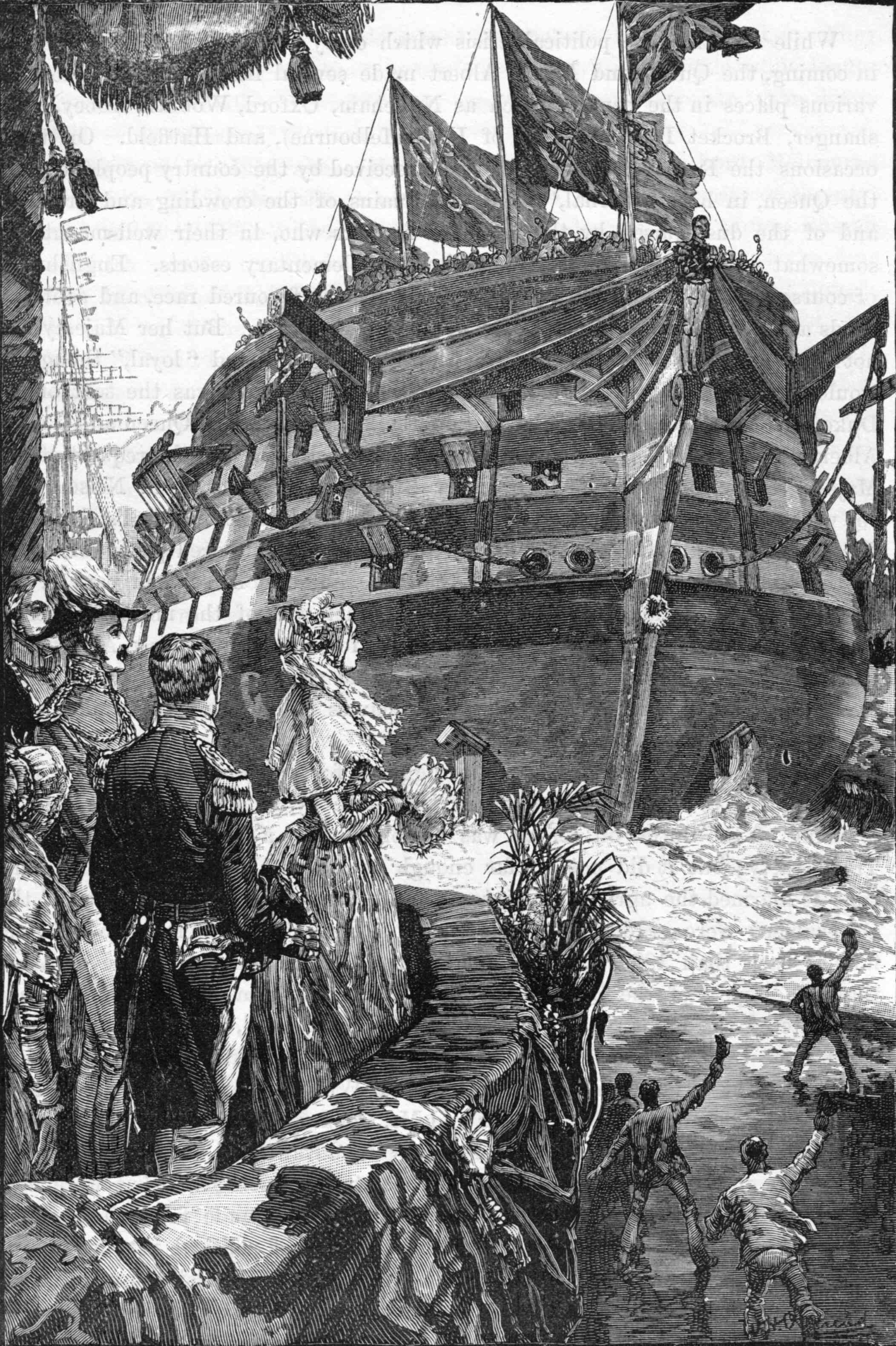
- Launching of Trafalgar

Class overview
- Name: Caledonia
- Operators: Royal Navy
- Succeeded by: Nelson class
- In service: 25 June 1808 – 1918
- Planned: 10
- Completed: 9

General characteristics
- Type: Ship of the line
- Length: 205 ft (62 m) (gundeck); 170 ft 11 in (52.10 m) (keel); Broadened: 205 ft 5 1/2 in (62.624 m) (gundeck); 170 ft 6 in (51.97 m) (keel)
- Beam: 53 ft 6 in (16.31 m); 54 ft 6 in (16.61 m) (broadened)
- Depth of hold: 23 ft 2 in (7.06 m)
- Propulsion: Sails
- Armament: 120 guns (original): Gundeck: 32 × 32-pounders; Middle gundeck: 34 × 24-pounders; Upper gundeck: 34 × 18-pounders; Quarterdeck: 6 × 12-pounders, 10 × 32-pounder carronades; Forecastle: 2 × 12-pounders, 2 × 32-pounder carronades; Poop deck: 2 × 18-pounder carronades; In 1847: Lower deck: 4 × 8" 65 cwt 9', 28 × 32-pdr 56 cwt; Middle deck: 2 × 8" 65 cwt 9', 32 × 32-pdr 50 cwt; Main deck: 34 × 32-pdr 42 cwt; QD FC: 6 × 32-pdr 45 cwt, 14 × 32-pdr 17 cwt

The Caledonia-class ships of the line were a class of nine 120-gun first rates, designed for the Royal Navy by Sir William Rule. A tenth ship, Royal Frederick, was ordered on 29 October 1827 to the same design, but was launched in 1833 as Queen to a fresh design by Sir William Symonds. The lead ship of the class, Caledonia, had "superb sailing qualities" and was chosen by the Board of Admiralty to serve as the model for all future three-decker ships of the line.

== Armament ==
In the original configuration, the armament of the Caledonia class was consistent for the first three ships of the class. The exception was an increase in firepower on the poop deck from two to six 18-pounder carronades.

Starting with the fourth ship, the armament of the class was significantly modified to adhere to the principle of a unified caliber of 32 pounds. All guns on the middle and upper gun decks were replaced with the same number of 32-pounders, except for two 24-pounders on the middle deck that were replaced by two 8-inch-shell guns. Four of the 12-pounder guns on the quarterdeck were replaced with 32-pounder carronades. The remaining two were increased to 18-pounders, along with the two 12-pounders on the forecastle, and the carronades on the poop deck were removed.

By 1847 the armament had been brought to the 32-pounder standard.

== Size ==
The last five ships of the class were built to a slightly broadened version of the draught, and this sub-class was armed in the same way as the last of the standard Caledonias, HMS Royal George. Except for Caledonia herself, all these ships were converted into steam-powered screw battleships during the 1850s.

== Ships ==
=== Standard group ===
- HMS Caledonia

Builder: Plymouth Dockyard
Ordered: 19 January 1797
Laid down: 1 January 1805
Launched: 25 June 1808
Fate: Broken up, 1875

- HMS Britannia

Builder: Plymouth Dockyard
Ordered: 11 June 1812
Laid down: December 1813
Launched: 20 October 1820
Fate: Broken up, 1869

- HMS Prince Regent

Builder: Chatham Dockyard
Ordered: 6 January 1812
Laid down: 17 July 1815
Launched: 12 April 1823
Fate: Broken up, 1873

- HMS Royal George

Builder: Chatham Dockyard
Ordered: 2 June 1819
Laid down: June 1823
Launched: 22 September 1827
Fate: Sold out of the service, 1875

=== Broadened group ===
- HMS Neptune

Builder: Portsmouth Dockyard
Ordered: 12 February 1823
Laid down: January 1827
Launched: 22 September 1832
Fate: Sold out of the service, 1875

- HMS Royal William

Builder: Pembroke Dockyard
Ordered: 30 December 1823
Laid down: October 1825
Launched: 2 April 1833
Fate: Burnt, 1899

- HMS Waterloo

Builder: Chatham Dockyard
Ordered: 9 September 1823
Laid down: March 1827
Launched: 10 June 1833
Fate: Burnt, 1918

- HMS St George

Builder: Plymouth Dockyard
Ordered: 2 June 1819
Laid down: May 1827
Launched: 27 August 1840
Fate: Sold out of the service, 1883

- HMS Trafalgar

Builder: Woolwich Dockyard
Ordered: 22 February 1825
Laid down: November 1829
Launched: 21 June 1841
Fate: Sold out of the service, 1906
