= HMS Hibernia (1804) =

Ship of the line of the Royal Navy

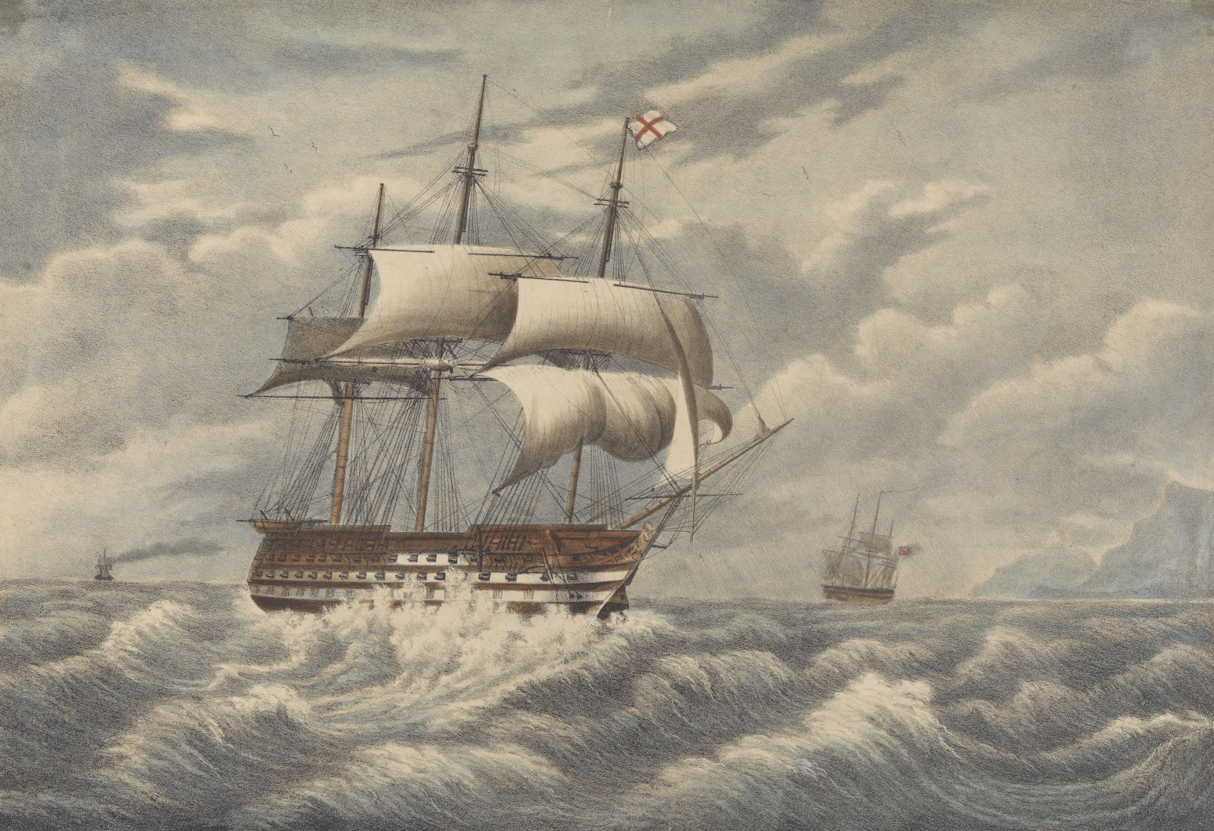
- Illustration of Hibernia by Charles de Brocktorff

History

United Kingdom
- Name: HMS Hibernia
- Ordered: 9 December 1790
- Builder: Plymouth dockyard
- Laid down: November 1797
- Launched: 17 November 1804
- Fate: Sold then broken up 1902

General characteristics
- Class & type: 110-gun first-rate ship of the line
- Tons burthen: 2,530 (bm)
- Length: 201 ft 2 in (61.32 m) (gundeck)
- Beam: 53 ft 1 in (16.18 m)
- Depth of hold: 22 ft 4 in (6.81 m)
- Propulsion: Sails
- Sail plan: Full-rigged ship
- Armament: 110 guns: Gundeck: 32 × 32-pounder guns; Middle gundeck: 32 × 24-pounder guns; Upper gundeck: 34 × 18-pounder guns; QD: 12 × 32-pounder carronades; Fc: 4 × 32-pounder carronades + 2 × 18-pounder guns

HMS Hibernia was a 110-gun first-rate ship of the line of the Royal Navy. She was launched at Plymouth dockyard on 17 November 1804, and was the only ship built to her draught, designed by Sir John Henslow.

On 11 January 1806, Hibernia capsized in the "Wembury River" — probably a reference to the River Yealm off Wembury, Devon, England — with the loss of 19 of her crew. She was later refloated, repaired, and returned to service.

Between 1807 and 1808, Hibernia, under the command of Sir William Sidney Smith, led the British escort of the Portuguese Royal Family during the transfer of the Portuguese Court to Brazil.

Hibernia was flagship of the British Mediterranean Fleet from 1816 until 1855, when she became the flagship for the Royal Navy's base at Malta and stationed in Grand Harbour. She remained in this role until she was sold in 1902.

Nonetheless, she did also take on some non-Mediterranean duties in the post-Waterloo period, such as to transport convicts to the colony of New South Wales. In 1818–1819, for example, the ship carried 160 male convicts to Sydney from Portsmouth sailing on 20 November and arriving 18 June. Also, on board as passengers were the first Minister of St James' Church, Sydney, Richard Hill and his wife.

The ten-day court-martial of the surviving officers and crewmen of the battleship HMS Victoria for the loss of their ship in a 22 June 1893 collision with the battleship HMS Camperdown near Tripoli was held on Hibernia's deck. The proceedings began on 17 July 1893.

Hibernia was sold for £1,010 to Michele Apap on 14 October 1902 and broken up at Pietà in 1903. Heavily painted timbers ended up being used to fire local bakeries, which led to an outbreak of lead poisoning on the island. A statue of the Virgin Mary, in her mantle as Queen of Heaven, was carved from a section of the ship's main mast and can be seen in the Collegiate Parish Church of St Paul's Shipwreck in Valletta. Her figurehead is now displayed at the Malta Maritime Museum, which is housed in the former Royal Naval Bakery building in Birgu, Malta.

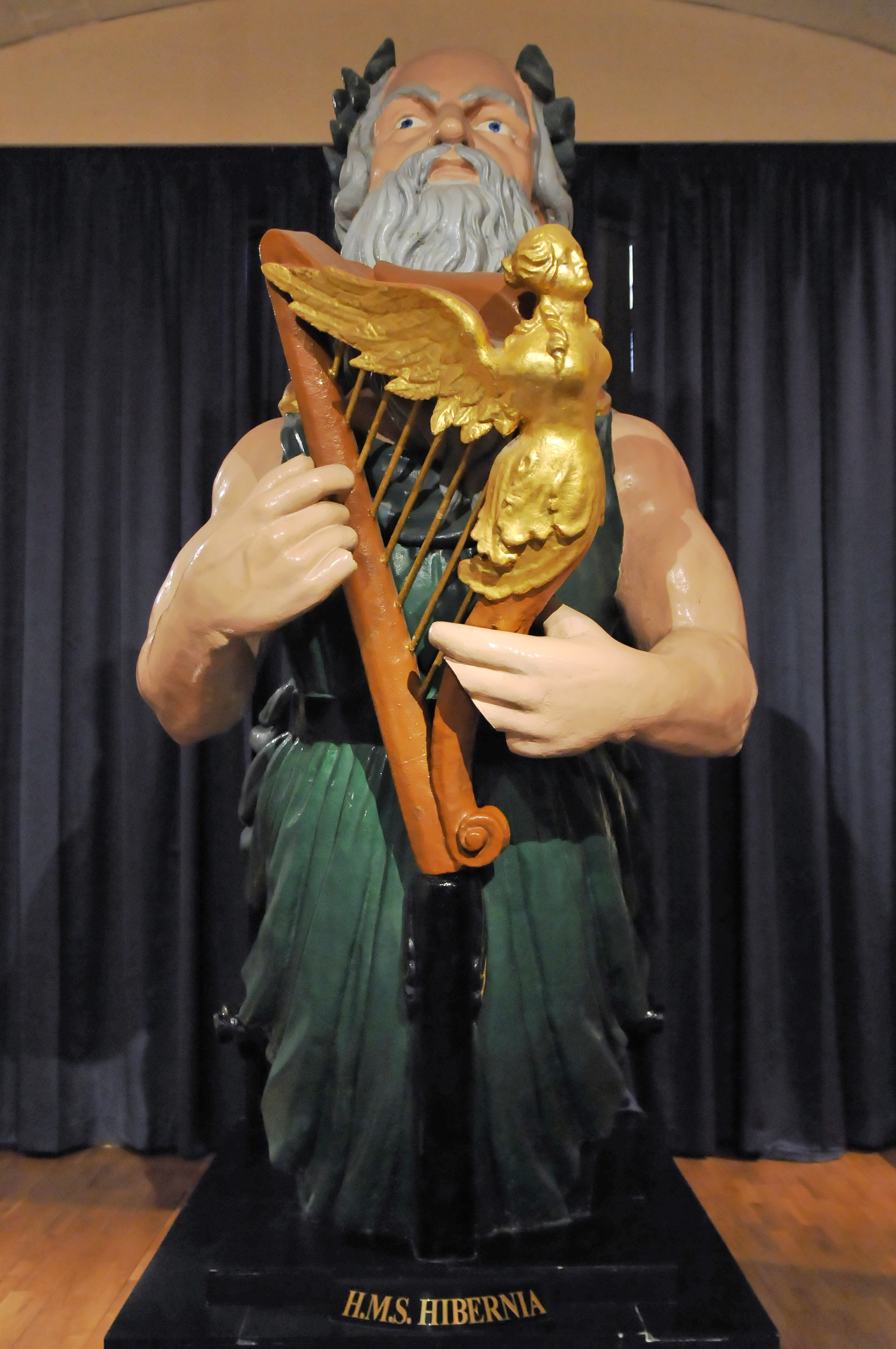
Hibernia's figurehead on display at the Malta Maritime Museum

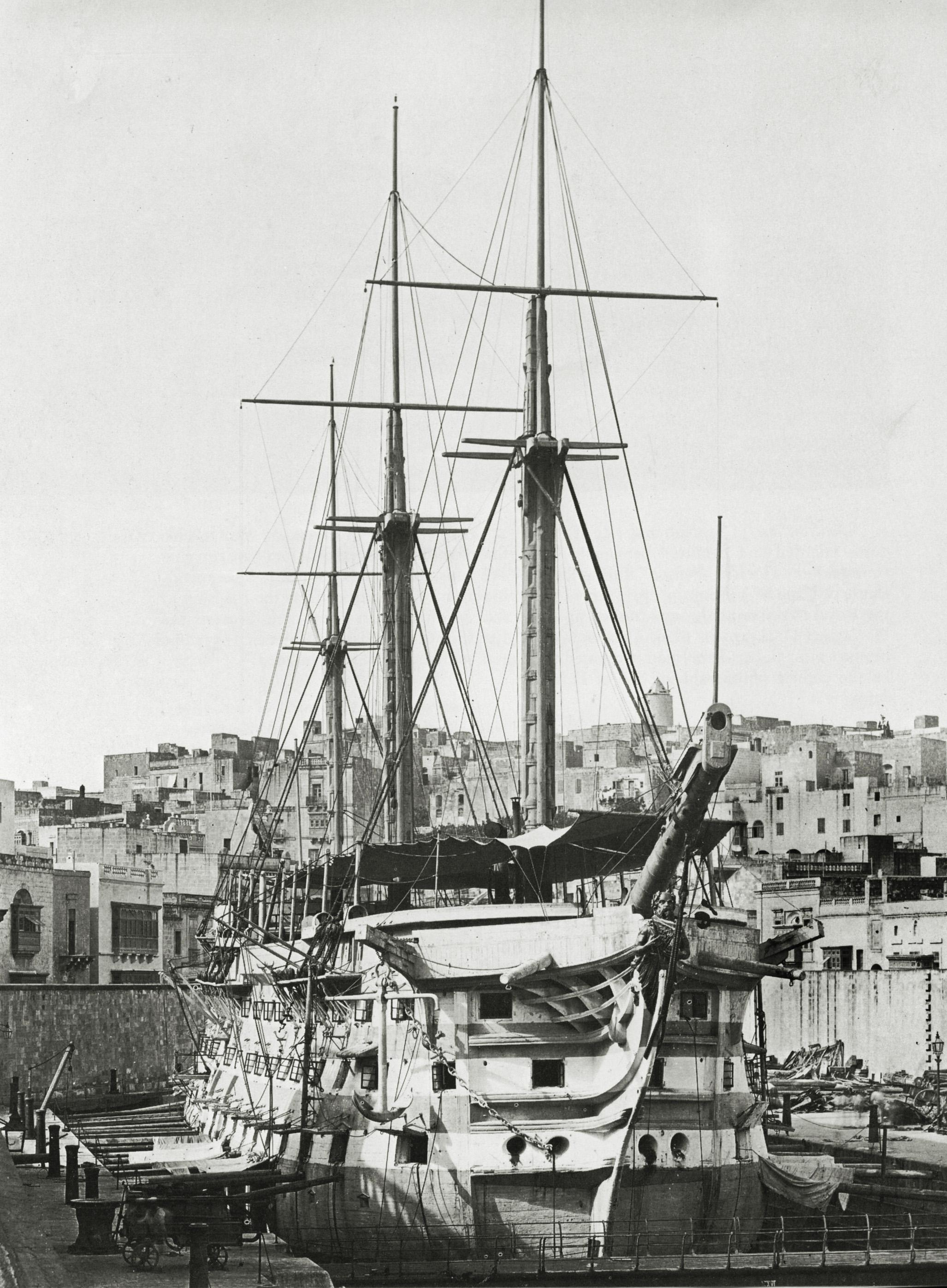
Hibernia in drydock at Malta, c. 1860

== Bibliography ==
- Hough, Richard. Admirals in Collision. New York: Viking Press, 1959. Library of Congress Card Catalog Number 59-13415.
- Lavery, Brian (1983) The Ship of the Line - Volume 1: The development of the battlefleet 1650-1850. Conway Maritime Press. ISBN 0-85177-252-8.
- Winfield, Rif (2008). British Warships in the Age of Sail 1793–1817: Design, Construction, Careers and Fates (revised ed.). Barnsley, UK: Seaforth Publishing. ISBN 978-1-84415-717-4.
