= Meteor (disambiguation) =

A meteor or "shooting star" is the visible streak of light from a heated and glowing object falling through the Earth's atmosphere.

- A meteoroid is a small rocky or metallic body travelling through outer space.
- A meteorite is a rock that has fallen from space to the Earth's surface.

Meteor may also refer to:

== Astronomy and space exploration ==
- Meteor (rocket), a Polish meteorology rocket (1963–1974)
- Meteor (satellite), three series of weather satellites of the Soviet Union, starting in 1969
- Meteor, a spacecraft recovery system being developed by the student-run Cambridge University society CU Spaceflight

== Geography ==
- Meteor, Wisconsin, a town in the United States
  - Meteor (community), Wisconsin, an unincorporated community, United States
- Meteor Crater, Arizona, United States
- Great Meteor Seamount, Portugal

== Science and technology ==
- Meteor (weather), any weather phenomenon, as studied in meteorology
- Meteor (web framework), an open-source JavaScript web application development platform
- METeOR, an Australian information repository
- Meteor goldfish, a variety of goldfish having no tail fin
- METEOR (Metric for Evaluation of Translation with Explicit ORdering), a metric for the evaluation of machine translation output

== Business ==
- Meteor (mobile network), a defunct mobile phone operator in Ireland
- Meteor Vineyard, a vineyard in Napa Valley

== Transport ==
- Météor, a codename for the Paris Metro Line 14
- Meteor (automobile), a brand of car from Ford Motor Company of Canada (1949–1976)
- Ford Meteor, a car model, available 1981–1995
- Mercury Meteor, a car in North America, 1961–1963
- Mormon Meteor, a 1930s racing car
- Volkswagen Meteor, a modified version of the MAN TGX made by Volkswagen Caminhões e Ônibus
- Meteor (St. Louis-San Francisco Railway), a named passenger train
- Silver Meteor, an Amtrak train service
- Meteor, a South Devon Railway Comet class 4-4-0ST steam locomotive
- List of ships named Meteor
  - USS Meteor, several U.S. Navy ships
  - HMS Meteor, several ships of the Royal Navy
  - SMS Meteor, several ships of the Imperial German Navy
  - Meteor (hydrofoil), a series of hydrofoil ships of the USSR

== Arts and entertainment ==
- Meteor Music Awards, Ireland's national music awards, also known as "The Meteors"
- Meteor (film), a 1979 science-fiction film
- Meteor (miniseries), a 2009 disaster-science fiction two-part TV mini-series starring Billy Campbell and Marla Sokoloff
- Meteor Records, an American record label
- The Meteors, English psychobilly band formed in 1980
- "Meteor" (Pink Lady song), 2019
- "Meteor", song by Changmo
- Kamen Rider Meteor, a fictional character in the Japanese television series Kamen Rider Fourze
- Meteor, a powerful magic spell in the video game Final Fantasy VII
- Meteors, a video game developed by Amusement World, notable for its recognition in Atari, Inc. v. Amusement World, Inc.
- Meteor, a 1929 play by S. N. Behrman
- Meteor, a science fiction short story by John Wyndham in the collection The Seeds of Time
- Meteor (horse), a racing horse

== Weaponry ==
- The Meteor hammer, a Chinese martial arts weapon or dance prop
- Gloster Meteor, the first British jet fighter and the Allies' first operational jet (1943–1970s)
- Rolls-Royce Meteor, a tank engine version of the Rolls-Royce Merlin
- MBDA Meteor, a next-generation beyond visual range air-to-air missile
- BSA Meteor Air Rifle, a Birmingham Small Arms Company-manufactured air rifle

== Other uses ==
- The Meteor, internal newspaper of Bryce Hospital in Tuscaloosa, Alabama, U.S.

== See also ==
- Meteorite (disambiguation)
- Meteorology, the interdisciplinary scientific study of the atmosphere
- Meteora (disambiguation)
