= List of shipwrecks in 1786 =

The list of shipwrecks in 1786 includes some ships sunk, wrecked or otherwise lost during 1786.

table of contents
1786
Jan	Feb	Mar	Apr
May	Jun	Jul	Aug
Sep	Oct	Nov	Dec
Unknown date

== January ==
=== 1 January ===
List of shipwrecks: 1 January 1786
Ship	State	Description
Betty	Sweden	The ship was driven ashore near St. Lucar, Spain. She was on a voyage from Memel, Prussia to Cádiz, Spain.
Cornelius	Sweden	The ship was driven ashore and wrecked near St. Lucar. She was on a voyage from Stockholm to Cádiz.
Jenny	Great Britain	The ship was driven ashore and wrecked 8 leagues (24 nautical miles (44 km)) from St. Andero, Spain with the loss of four of her crew.
Senhouse	Great Britain	The ship was driven ashore at "Llencalth" and severely damaged. She was on a voyage from London to Barbados.

=== 3 January ===
List of shipwrecks: 3 January 1786
Ship	State	Description
James	Great Britain	The ship was wrecked on the south coast of the Isle of Wight. She was on a voyage from Sunderland, County Durham to Portsmouth, Hampshire.

=== 4 January ===
List of shipwrecks: 4 January 1786
Ship	State	Description
Rosamund	Great Britain	The ship sank at Plymouth, Devon.
St. Antonia Boa Viagem	Great Britain	The ship was severely damaged at Plymouth. She was on a voyage from Porto to London, Great Britain.
Trecothick	Great Britain	The ship was lost between Fowey and Looe, Cornwall with the loss of thirteen of her seventeen crew. She was on a voyage from London to Grenada.
Twee Gesustus	Dutch Republic	The ship sank at Plymouth. She was on a voyage from Bordeaux, France to Amsterdam.
Zeelust	Dutch Republic	The ship was driven ashore and wrecked at Plymouth. She was on a voyage from Nantes, France to Amsterdam.

=== 5 January ===
List of shipwrecks: 5 January 1786
Ship	State	Description
Hannah	Great Britain	The ship sank at Dún Laoghaire, County Dublin, Ireland. She was on a voyage from Waterford, Ireland to Liverpool, Lancashire.

=== 6 January ===
List of shipwrecks: 6 January 1786
Ship	State	Description
Concord	Flag unknown	The ship was wrecked at "Helleness", 8 nautical miles (15 km) south of "Inerwick", Orkney Islands, Great Britain. There were eleven survivors from more than 50 people aboard. She was on a voyage from Copenhagen, Denmark to India.
Halsewell	British East India Company	Halsewell The full-rigged ship was driven ashore and wrecked at St Alban's Head, Dorset with the loss of over 240 lives. There were 74 survivors.
James	Great Britain	The ship was wrecked on the south coast of the Isle of Wight. she was on a voyage from Sunderland, County Durham to Portsmouth, Hampshire.
Eleven unnamed vessels	Sweden	The ships were wrecked on the coast of Essex, Great Britain.

=== 7 January ===
List of shipwrecks: 7 January 1786
Ship	State	Description
Jonge Ricke	Dutch Republic	The ship foundered in the North Sea west of Ostend, West Flanders, Austrian Netherlands. Her crew were rescued.
L'Aimable Desirée	France	The brigantine was wrecked at San Sebastián, Spain with the loss of all but two of her crew.

=== 8 January ===
List of shipwrecks: 8 January 1786
Ship	State	Description
Hero	Great Britain	The ship foundered in St. Brides Bay. Her crew were rescued. She was on a voyage from Virginia, United States to London.

=== 10 January ===
List of shipwrecks: 10 January 1786
Ship	State	Description
Notre Dame de Montserrat	Spain	The polacca was wrecked at Cádiz. She was on a voyage from Montevideo, Viceroyalty of the Río de la Plata to Cádiz.
Thomas and Wiliam	Great Britain	The ship capsized and sank at Cork, Ireland. She was on a voyage from Bristol, Gloucestershire to Cork.
Two unnamed vessels	Sweden	The ships were wrecked at Cádiz.
Unnamed	Great Britain	The ship was wrecked at Cádiz with the loss of 42 or 43 of the 47 people on board. She was on a voyage from London to Gibraltar.
Unnamed	Denmark	The ship was wrecked between Conil de la Frontera and "Saint Petri", Spain. Her crew were rescued.

=== 11 January ===
List of shipwrecks: 11 January 1786
Ship	State	Description
Unnamed	Flag unknown	The ship was wrecked between the Bass Rock and the Isle of May, Fife.

=== 14 January ===
List of shipwrecks: 14 January 1786
Ship	State	Description
Peggy	Great Britain	The ship was driven ashore and damaged at Waterford, Ireland. She was on a voyage from Virginia, United States to Whitehaven, Cumberland.
Two unnamed vessels	Flags unknown	The ships were wrecked near Thisted, Denmark with the loss of all hands.

=== 15 January ===
List of shipwrecks: 15 January 1786
Ship	State	Description
Nancy	Ireland	The ship was wrecked on The Skerries, in the Irish Sea off the coast of County Down. She was on a voyage from Memel, Prussia to Drogheda, County Louth.
Pomona	Ireland	The ship was lost 2 nautical miles (3.7 km) east of the Waterford Lighthouse with the loss of three of her crew. She was on a voyage from Málaga, Spain to Belfast, County Antrim.
Ross	Great Britain	The brig foundered in the Atlantic Ocean. Her crew were rescued by Thistle (Great Britain).

=== 17 January ===
List of shipwrecks: 17 January 1786
Ship	State	Description
William and Margaret	Great Britain	The ship was lost near Youghal, County Cork, Ireland. She was on a voyage from Dungarvan, County Waterford, Ireland to Liverpool, Lancashire.

=== 18 January ===
List of shipwrecks: 18 January 1786
Ship	State	Description
Unnamed	Ireland	The brig was wrecked on Cable Island, County Cork with the loss of two of her crew.
Two unnamed vessels	Flags unknown	The ships foundered off Cable Island. Survivors were pelted with stones by the local inhabitants.

=== Unknown date ===
List of shipwrecks: Unknown date in January 1786
Ship	State	Description
Antilope	Great Britain	The ship was driven ashore and wrecked at Slapton, Devon, Great Britain. She was on a voyage from St. Ubes, Portugal to Gothenburg.
Betsey	Great Britain	The ship was driven ashore in Whitsand Bay. She was on a voyage from Lisbon, Portugal to London.
Britannia	Great Britain	The ship was driven ashore at Spurn Point, Yorkshire. She was on a voyage from Newcastle upon Tyne, Northumberland to London.
Catharine	Great Britain	The ship was lost near Plymouth, Devon. She was on a voyage from Lisbon to London.
Crescent	French Navy	The Enterprise-class frigate was wrecked off Petit-Goâve, Saint-Domingue.
Defiance	Great Britain	The ship foundered in the Atlantic Ocean off Ouessant, France. She was on a voyage from "Guyon" to London.
Diana	Great Britain	The ship was driven ashore at Spurn Point. She was on a voyage from Newcastle upon Tyne to London.
Dispatch	Great Britain	The ship was driven ashore near Boulogne, France. She was on a voyage from Waterford, Ireland to London
Enterprize	Great Britain	The ship was driven ashore at Lisbon. She was later refloated.
Everton	Great Britain	The ship was driven ashore at Gibraltar.
Fanny	Great Britain	The ship was driven ashore near Lyme, Dorset. She was on a voyage from London to Jamaica. She was later refloated and taken in to Poole, Dorset.
Fountain	Great Britain	The full-rigged ship capsized in the Atlantic Ocean with the loss of all on board.
Friends	Great Britain	The ship was lost at Madeira.
Friends	Great Britain	The ship was lost off Portland, Dorset. She was on a voyage from Seville, Spain to London, or vice versa.
Friendship	Great Britain	The ship was driven ashore and wrecked near Dunbar, Lothian. She was on a voyage from Leith, Lothian to London.
Friendship	Great Britain	The ship was lost at Porto, Portugal. She was on a voyage from Newfoundland, British America to Porto.
Ganges	Dutch East India Company	The East Indiaman was wrecked in the Atlantic Ocean and put into Padstow, Cornwall, Great Britain. She was abandoned by her crew and plundered by the local inhabitants.
George	Great Britain	The ship was driven ashore at Salcombe, Devon.
Grampus	Great Britain	The ship was wrecked in Bigbury Bay with the loss of all hands. She was on a voyage from Newfoundland to Dartmouth, Devon.
Hercules	Great Britain	The ship was wrecked near Montrose, Forfarshire with the loss of all on board.
Hibernia	Ireland	The brig foundered in Tramore Bay with the loss of all ten crew. She was on a voyage from Waterford to London.
Hope	Great Britain	The ship was driven ashore and wrecked near Helston, Cornwall. She was on a voyage from Lisbon to London.
Jupiter	Great Britain	The ship was driven ashore at Steden Point, Zealand, Denmark. She was on a voyage from Memel, Prussia to London.
Le Maria	France	The ship was driven ashore on the Isle of Wight, Great Britain.
Marie Anne	France	The ship was driven ashore near Sandown Castle, Kent, Great Britain. She was on a voyage from La Rochelle to Dunkerque.
Martha	Great Britain	The ship was wrecked off Boulogne. She was on a voyage from Milford, Pembrokeshire to London.
Molly	Ireland	The ship was driven ashore and damaged at Kinsale, County Cork. She was on a voyage from Rotterdam, Dutch Republic to Londonderry. Molly was later refloated.
Notre-Dame-de-Montserrat	Spain	The polacca was wrecked at Cádiz.
Nancy	Great Britain	The ship was lost at Port a Ferry, County Down, Ireland. She was on a voyage from Cork, Ireland to Bristol, Gloucestershire.
Patience	Denmark	The ship was lost near "St. Peter's Castle". Her crew were rescued. She was on a voyage from Riga, Russia to Marseille, France.
Peggy	Great Britain	The ship foundered in the Bristol Channel off Minehead, Somerset. She was on a voyage from Waterford to Bristol.
Piedmont	Great Britain	The ship was driven ashore near Saltfleet, Lincolnshire. Her crew were rescued. She was on a voyage from London to Hull, Yorkshire. Piedmont was later refloated and taken in to Hull.
Pilten	Great Britain	The sloop was run down and sunk by Monmouth (Great Britain). She was on a voyage from Neath, Glamorgan to Barnstaple, Devon.
Polly	Great Britain	The ship was lost near Portland. She was on a voyage from New Providence, New Jersey, United States to London.
Prescieux	France	The ship was driven ashore and severely damaged in the Garonne. She was on a voyage from Saint-Domingue to Bordeaux.
Prince of Wales	Great Britain	The ship was lost near Aveiro, Portugal. She was on a voyage from the United States to Lisbon.
Providence	Great Britain	The ship was driven ashore and wrecked at Plymouth. She was on a voyage from Liverpool, Lancashire to Teignmouth, Devon.
Rose	Ireland	The ship foundered in the Atlantic Ocean off Cape Clear Island County Cork. Her crew were rescued. She was on a voyage from Philadelphia to Dublin.
Sally	Great Britain	The ship was lost near Copenhagen, Denmark. She was on a voyage from Memel to Pool, Dorset.
Silecia	Great Britain	The ship was driven ashore near Weymouth, Dorset. She was on a voyage from London to Bristol.
Snowden Hill	Great Britain	The ship was driven ashore at Beaumaris, Anglesey. She was on a voyage from Liverpool to Aberdovey, Cardiganshire.
Speedwell	Great Britain	The ship was lost near Plymouth. She was on a voyage from Bilbao, Spain to Plymouth.
St Elias	Russia	The ship was wrecked on the French coast with the loss of three of her crew. She was on a voyage from Saint Petersburg to Nantes, France.
Thomas and Mary	Great Britain	The ship foundered in the Bristol Channel off Minehead. She was on a voyage from Ross-on-Wye, Herefordshire to Bristol.
Thomas and William	Great Britain	The ship capsized at Cork.
William & Margaret	Great Britain	The ship was lost near Youghall, County Cork, Ireland. She was on a voyage from Dungarvan, County Waterford, Ireland to London.
Two unnamed vessels	France	The ship ran aground and sank off Sunderland, County Durham, Great Britain. There were seven survivors.
Unnamed	Flag unknown	The sloop was wrecked near Slade, County Wexford, Ireland with the loss of all but two of her crew.
Unnamed	Algerine Corsairs	The corsair foundered off "Fara", Portugal. Her crew survived.
Unnamed	Algerine Corsairs	The corsair foundered off Vila Real, Portugal. Her crew survived.

== February ==
=== 2 February ===
List of shipwrecks: 2 February 1786
Ship	State	Description
San Pedro de Alcantara	Spanish Navy	The fourth rate ship-of-the-line sank in the Atlantic Ocean off Peniche, Portugal with the loss of 128 of the 398 people on board. She was on a voyage from Lima, Viceroyalty of Peru to Cádiz.

=== 3 February ===
List of shipwrecks: 3 February 1786
Ship	State	Description
Alexander	Great Britain	The ship was driven ashore at Saltcoats, Ayrshire with the loss of all but one of her crew. She was on a voyage from Greenock, Renfrewshire to The Rosses, County Donegal, Ireland.
San Pedro de Alacantra	Spanish Navy	The man-of-war was wrecked near Peniche, Portugal with the loss of 180 lives..
Four unnamed vessels	Flags unknown	The ships were driven ashore at Gibraltar.

=== 5 February ===
List of shipwrecks: 5 February 1786
Ship	State	Description
Emperor	Great Britain	The ship was driven ashore at Calais, France. She was on a voyage from Ostend, Dutch Republic to Liverpool, Lancashire.

=== 7 February ===
List of shipwrecks: 7 February 1786
Ship	State	Description
L'Amiable Desirée	France	The brigantine was wrecked off San Sebastián, Spain with the loss of all but two of her crew. She was on a voyage from Bayonne to Cádiz, Spain.
Maria	Great Britain	The brig was wrecked on the Goodwin Sands, Kent. Her ten crew took to a boat, they landed at Zierikzee, Zeeland, Dutch Republic. She was on a voyage from Borrowstounness, Lothian to Falmouth, Cornwall.

=== 21 February ===
List of shipwrecks: 21 February 1786
Ship	State	Description
Jenny	Great Britain	The ship was driven ashore and wrecked on the Isle of Arran. Her crew were rescued. She was on a voyage from Greenock, Renfrewshire to Antigua.

=== 22 February ===
List of shipwrecks: 22 February 1786
Ship	State	Description
Iris	Great Britain	The ship was driven ashore and wrecked at Great Yarmouth, Norfolk. Her crew were rescued. She was on a voyage from Hamburg to Saint Thomas, Virgin Islands.
Minerva	Great Britain	The ship was wrecked on the Corton Sand, in the North Sea off the coast of Suffolk with the loss of all hands. She was on a voyage from Hamburg to London.
William	United States	The schooner was wrecked on a reef off Bermuda with the ultimate loss of five of her six crew. The survivor was rescued on 28 February. She was on a voyage from Plymouth, Massachusetts to Saint Eustatius.
Unnamed	Flag unknown	The ship was driven ashore at Caister-on-Sea, Norfolk. Her crew were rescued.

=== 23 February ===
List of shipwrecks: 23 February 1786
Ship	State	Description
William	Great Britain	The ship was driven ashore at Roscoff, France. She was on a voyage from London to Ostend, Dutch Republic and Nantes, France.

=== 25 February ===
List of shipwrecks: 25 February 1786
Ship	State	Description
Earl Tyrone	Ireland	The ship was lost near Land's End, Cornwall, Great Britain. She was on a voyage from Dungarvan, County Waterford to Portsmouth, Hampshire, Great Britain.

=== 26 February ===
List of shipwrecks: 26 February 1786
Ship	State	Description
Enterprize	Great Britain	The ship foundered in the Atlantic Ocean whilst on a voyage from Rhode Island, United States to Dublin, Ireland with the loss of two of her crew. Survivors were rescued by Buckthorn (Great Britain).

=== 28 February ===
List of shipwrecks: 28 February 1786
Ship	State	Description
Unnamed	Great Britain	The brig was wrecked at Skerries, County Dublin, Ireland with the loss of all hands. She was on a voyage from Workington, Cumberland to Dublin, Ireland.

=== Unknown date ===
List of shipwrecks: Unknown date in February 1786
Ship	State	Description
Adventure	Great Britain	The ship was wrecked at Trapani, Kingdom of Sicily.
Brothers	Ireland	The ship was wrecked on the coast of Scotland. She was on a voyage from Killybegs, County Donegal to Bristol, Gloucestershire, Great Britain.
Concordia	Denmark	The ship was lost in the Shetland Islands, Great Britain with the loss of all but thirteen of her crew. She was on a voyage from Copenhagen to the East Indies.
Fermuse	Kingdom of Sicily	The ship was wrecked on the coast of Portugal. She was on a voyage from Newfoundland, British America to Naples.
Friendship	Great Britain	The ship was lost on the coast of Cornwall. She was on a voyage from Cork, Ireland to Falmouth, Cornwall.
Harmony	Ireland	The ship was wrecked on the Goodwin Sands, Kent, Great Britain. She was on a voyage from Dublin to Rotterdam, Dutch Republic.
Helena	Great Britain	The hoy was driven ashore 3 nautical miles (5.6 km) from Great Yarmouth, Norfolk. She was on a voyage from Emden, Electorate of Hanover to London.
Houghton	Great Britain	The ship was driven ashore in the River Thames. She was on a voyage from Porto, Portugal to London.
Mary	Ireland	The ship was lost at the Koog of Texel, Dutch Republic. She was on a voyage from Dublin to Rotterdam.
Prosperity	Ireland	The ship was wrecked on the Dutch coast. She was on a voyage from Belfast, County Antrim to Gothenburg, Sweden and the West Indies.

== March ==
=== 4 March ===
List of shipwrecks: 4 March 1786
Ship	State	Description
Bahama	Great Britain	The ship was wrecked on the Bimini Rocks, Bahamas. She was on a voyage from British Honduras to New Providence, New Jersey, United States.
Hedwig Christiana	France	The ship was wrecked on the coast of Spain. She was on a voyage from Cette to Alderney, Channel Islands.

=== 5 March ===
List of shipwrecks: 5 March 1786
Ship	State	Description
Clio	Great Britain	The ship foundered in the Atlantic Ocean (37°37′N 50°51′W). Her crew were rescued on 22 March by a French ship. She was on a voyage from Jamaica to London.
Friendship	Ireland	The ship foundered between Cádiz and the Strait of Gibraltar, Spain. Her crew were rescued. She was on a voyage from Cádiz to Cork.
Postillion	Dutch Republic	The ship was driven ashore and wrecked north of St. Lucar, Spain. She was on a voyage from Ostend to Cádiz.

=== 12 March ===
List of shipwrecks: 12 March 1786
Ship	State	Description
Unnamed	Sweden	The ship foundered in Sole Bay, Suffolk, Great Britain with some loss of life. Survivors were rescued by two fishing boats.

=== 15 March ===
List of shipwrecks: 15 March 1786
Ship	State	Description
Friends Adventure	Great Britain	The brigantine was wrecked on Sandy Key, off Grand Bahama, Bahamas. All on board survived. They made a small boat from the wreckage and reached the Abaco Islands on 7 June. Friends Adventure broke up on 2 May.

=== 16 March ===
List of shipwrecks: 16 March 1786
Ship	State	Description
Christian	Great Britain	The ship was driven ashore at Bridlington, Yorkshire. She was on a voyage from Leith, Lothian to Rotterdam, Dutch Republic.
John & Elizabeth	Great Britain	The ship was driven ashore at Whitby, Yorkshire. She was on a voyage from Chatham, Kent to Sunderland, County Durham.
Nancy	United States	The sloop was driven ashore at Swansborough, North Carolina. She was on a voyage from Charleston, South Carolina to New York.
Vulcan	Great Britain	The ship was driven ashore 20 nautical miles (37 km) north of Newcastle upon Tyne, Northumberland. She was on a voyage from Jamaica to Newcastle upon Tyne.

=== 17 March ===
List of shipwrecks: 17 March 1786
Ship	State	Description
Henrietta	Great Britain	The ship was wrecked on the coast of Yorkshire. Her crew were rescued.

=== 31 March ===
List of shipwrecks: 31 March 1786
Ship	State	Description
John & Elizabeth	Great Britain	The ship ran aground at Plymouth, Devon with the loss of three of her crew. She was refloated.

=== Unknown date ===
List of shipwrecks: Unknown date in March 1786
Ship	State	Description
Betsey	Great Britain	The ship was lost at Pool, Dorset. She was on a voyage from Sandwich, Kent to Pool.
Elogium	Great Britain	The ship foundered in the North Sea off the coast of Lincolnshire.
Endeavour	Great Britain	The ship was driven ashore in Dunworley Bay. She was on a voyage from Limerick, Ireland to Bristol, Gloucestershire.
Flora	Great Britain	The ship was lost at Great Yarmouth, Norfolk. She was on a voyage from Newcastle upon Tyne, Northumberland to London.
Frederick	Sweden	The ship was driven ashore and wrecked at Caister-on-Sea, Norfolk. She was on a voyage from Gothenburg to Lisbon, Portugal.
Friendship	Great Britain	The ship was driven ashore at Happisburgh, Norfolk. She was on a voyage from Emden, Electorate of Hanover to London.
Hannah	Great Britain	The ship foundered. Her crew were rescued by Brothers (Great Britain). Hannah was on a voyage from London to Bordeaux, France.
Happy Return	Great Britain	The ship was wrecked on the Welsh coast. Her crew were rescued. She was on a voyage from Bristol to Liverpool, Lancashire.
Jenny	Great Britain	The ship was wrecked near Drogheda, County Louth, Ireland with the loss of all hands. She was on a voyage from Dundalk, County Louth to Liverpool.
Johnson	Great Britain	The ship was wrecked on The Skerries, in the Irish Sea, with the loss of all hands.
La San Jos la Conception	Spain	The ship foundered in the Atlantic Ocean off Ouessant, France. Her crew were rescued. She was on a voyage from Bristol to St. Andero.
Mercurius	Hamburg	The ship was lost near Dunkirk, France. She was on a voyage from Saint Petersburg, Russia to Bordeaux.
Molly	Great Britain	The ship was wrecked at Carlingford, County Louth, Ireland. Her crew were rescued. She was on a voyage from Greenock, Renfrewshire to Portsmouth, Hampshire.
Polly	Great Britain	The ship was wrecked on the Wicklow Bank, in the Irish Sea. Her crew were rescued.
Rose & Sally	Great Britain	The ship foundered whilst on a voyage from Tinmouth, Devon to Bristol.
Sally	Great Britain	The ship was driven ashore and wrecked on the coast of Suffolk 4 nautical miles (7.4 km) south of Great Yarmouth. She was on a voyage from Gainsborough, Lincolnshire to Colchester, Essex.
Success	Great Britain	The ship was driven ashore at Waxham, Norfolk. She was on a voyage from Sunderland, County Durham to Guernsey, Channel Islands.
Vrow Catharina	Hanover	The ship was driven ashore at North Somercotes, Lincolnshire. Her crew were rescued. She was on a voyage from Emden to Pool, Dorset, Great Britain.
Woodhouse	Great Britain	The ship was driven ashore at Beachy Head, Sussex. She was on a voyage from Lisbon to Hull, Yorkshire.
Unnamed	Denmark	The West Indiaman foundered off Terschelling, Friesland, Dutch Republic with the loss of all hands.
Several unnamed vessels	Flags unknown	The ships were driven ashore on the coast of Friesland.
Unnamed	Kingdom of Naples	The settee was captured by Algerine Corsairs off Cartagena, Spain. She was attacked the next day by two Portuguese Navy frigates and a polacca. Her captors set her afire, and she exploded and sank with the loss of all on board.
Unnamed	Algerine Corsairs	The barque was attacked by two Portuguese Navy frigates and a polacca and sunk off Carthagena.

== April ==
=== 1 April ===
List of shipwrecks: 1 April 1786
Ship	State	Description
Mary	Flag unknown	The schooner was wrecked on Tinker's island, off the coast of Marblehead. Everyone on board died. The ship and goods were fully lost. She was on a voyage from Bilbao, Spain to Boston, Massachusetts, United States.
Unnamed	Unspecified West Indies company	The brig was wrecked near Plymouth, Massachusetts. Everyone on board died. The ship passed between two rocks and became stranded on a sandbar, stuck even after high tide. She was on a voyage from Bilbao to Boston.

=== 2 April ===
List of shipwrecks: 2 April 1786
Ship	State	Description
Lady Cathcart	Great Britain	The ship was wrecked on the south west coast of Hispaniola. Her crew were rescued. She was on a voyage from London to Jamaica.

=== 10 April ===
List of shipwrecks: 10 April 1786
Ship	State	Description
Carolina	United States	The ship foundered in the Atlantic Ocean. Her crew were rescued. She was on a voyage from Wilmington, Delaware to a port in North Carolina.

=== 12 April ===
List of shipwrecks: 12 April 1786
Ship	State	Description
Unnamed	Spain	The ship ran aground on a reef 3 leagues (9 nautical miles (17 km)) north west of Grand Bahama, Bahamas and was abandoned by her crew. She broke up on 25 April.

=== 14 April ===
List of shipwrecks: 14 April 1786
Ship	State	Description
Unnamed	Republic of Venice	The ship was driven ashore and wrecked at Tripoli, Ottoman Tripolitania with the loss of most of her crew.

=== 17 April ===
List of shipwrecks: 17 April 1786
Ship	State	Description
Adriana	Dutch Republic	The ship was driven ashore at Hellevoetsluis. She was on a voyage from Smyrna, Ottoman Empire to Rotterdam.

=== 20 April ===
List of shipwrecks: 20 April 1786
Ship	State	Description
Maria Elizabeth	Flag unknown	The ship was driven ashore and wrecked 2 nautical miles (3.7 km) north of Deal, Kent, Great Britain.

=== 24 April ===
List of shipwrecks: 24 April 1786
Ship	State	Description
Fly	(Kingdom of Great Britain) Jersey	The ship foundered in the Atlantic Ocean whilst on a voyage from Jersey to Newfoundland, British America. Her crew were rescued.

=== Unknown date ===
List of shipwrecks: Unknown date in April 1786
Ship	State	Description
American	United States	The ship capsized at Fayal, Azores with the loss of all but two of her crew. She was on a voyage from Philadelphia, Pennsylvania to Fayal.
Ann	Great Britain	The ship sprang a leak in the Atlantic Ocean. She was run ashore at Fayal and was wrecked.
Cato	Hamburg	The ship was wrecked on the Corton Sand, in the North Sea off the coast of Suffolk with the loss of three of her crew. She was on a voyage from Altona, Hamburg to Barcelona, Spain.
Horizon	Great Britain	The ship was driven ashore and wrecked at San Sebastián, Spain. She was on a voyage from Trapani, Kingdom of Sicily to a Baltic port.
Jamaica Paquet	Great Britain	The ship was struck by lightning and destroyed by fire in the Atlantic Ocean 18 leagues (54 nautical miles (100 km)) south west of Grand Cayman, Cayman Islands. Her crew were rescued by Amity (Great Britain). Jamaica Paquet was on a voyage from Jamaica to London.
James	Great Britain	The ship foundered in the Bristol Channel off Lundy Island, Devon. She was on a voyage from Dartmouth, Devon to Neath, Glamorgan.
Lucia Emerantia	(Denmark) Danish Asiatic Company	The East Indiaman was lost at the Cape of Good Hope. She was on a voyage from Bengal to copenhagen. She was later refloated and resumed her voyage.
Prince George	Great Britain	The ship was driven ashore on the Holderness coast, Yorkshire. She was on a voyage from London to Sunderland, County Durham.
Seville Packet	Great Britain	The ship ran aground near St. Mary's, Isles of Scilly. She was on a voyage from Liverpool, Lancashire to Cádiz, Spain.

== May ==
=== 6 May ===
List of shipwrecks: 6 May 1786
Ship	State	Description
Lord Townsend	Great Britain	The ship ran aground on the Colorados and was wrecked. Her crew were rescued. She was on a voyage from Jamaica to London.

=== 7 May ===
List of shipwrecks: 7 May 1786
Ship	State	Description
Zonsderdorf	Prussia	The ship foundered in the Dogger Bank. Her crew were rescued. She was on a voyage from Liverpool, Lancashire, Great Britain to Königsberg.

=== Unknown date ===
List of shipwrecks: Unknown date in May 1786
Ship	State	Description
Albion	Great Britain	The ship foundered in the Irish Sea off Arklow, County Wicklow, Ireland with the loss of all hands. She was on a voyage from Drogheda, County Louth, Ireland to Bristol. Gloucestershire.
Alexander	Great Britain	The ship ran aground and sank in the River Thames. She was on a voyage from London to Cádiz, Spain.
Betsey	Great Britain	The ship was wrecked on the Calf of Man, Isle of Man. She was on a voyage from Newry, County Antrim, Ireland to Liverpool, Lancashire.
Betsey	Great Britain	The ship was wrecked on Zea, Republic of Venice. She was on a voyage from Smyrna, Ottoman Empire to London.
Clyde	Great Britain	The ship was lost whilst on a voyage from Cork to Lisbon, Portugal. Her crew were rescued.
Friendship	Great Britain	The ship was destroyed by fire at Rotterdam, Dutch Republic.
Neptune	Great Britain	The ship was driven ashore and wrecked at Danzig. She was on a voyage from Liverpool to Danzig.
Prosperous	Great Britain	The ship was driven ashore on the Île d'Oléron, France. She was on a voyage from London to Newfoundland, British America. She was later refloated and taken in to St Martin's, Isles of Scilly for repairs.
Rebecca	Great Britain	The ship was lost near the mouth of the Llobregat, Spain. She was on a voyage from Barcelona, Spain to Zant, Republic of Venice.
Sally	Great Britain	The ship departed from Cádiz for Newfoundland. No further trace, presumed foundered in the Atlantic Ocean with the loss of all hands.
St. Joseph	Spain	The ship was driven ashore and wrecked at Santoña. She was on a voyage from London to Bilbao.
St. Joze e St. Antonio	Portugal	The ship was wrecked at Aveiro, Portugal. She was on a voyage from Pernambuco, Brazil to Lisbon.

== June ==
=== 10 June ===
List of shipwrecks: 10 June 1786
Ship	State	Description
Mary	United States	The ship was wrecked on Tincker's Island, Massachusetts with the loss of all hands. She was on a voyage from Bilboa, Spain to Marblehead, Massachusetts.
Unnamed	United States	The brig was driven ashore near Plymouth, Massachusetts.

=== Unknown date ===
List of shipwrecks: Unknown date in June 1786
Ship	State	Description
Crown	Great Britain	The ship was driven ashore in the Orkney Islands. She was on a voyage from Whitehaven to Memel, Prussia.
Eagle	United States	The brig was wrecked in the Turks Islands. She was on a voyage from Philadelphia, Pennsylvania to Jamaica.

== July ==
=== 13 July ===
List of shipwrecks: 13 July 1786
Ship	State	Description
Two ship′s boats	France	A barge and two longboats, operating as part of the La Perouse Expedition, were swept into a tidal bore during an ebb tide near the entrance to Lituya Bay in southeastern Russian America. Two of the craft were wrecked, killing all 21 men aboard them; their bodies were not recovered. The third craft escaped.

=== 16 July ===
List of shipwrecks: 16 July 1786
Ship	State	Description
Eliza	Great Britain	The ship was lost at Barbados.

=== Unknown date ===
List of shipwrecks: Unknown date in July 1786
Ship	State	Description
Britannia	Great Britain	The ship was driven ashore and wrecked in the River Thames at Pitcher's Point. She was on a voyage from Grenada to London.
Lutin	(Kingdom of France) French West India Company	The ship departed from Africa for the French West Indies. No further trace, presumed foundered with the loss of all hands.
Rose	Great Britain	The ship was lost in the Bay of Bulls.
Scotia	Great Britain	The ship foundered in the North Channel. She was on a voyage from Barnstaple, Devon to Coleraine, County Antrim, Ireland.
Unnamed	{ Kingdom of Slavonia	The ship was wrecked on "La Porie du Fer", in the Danube with loss of life.

== August ==
=== 5 August ===
List of shipwrecks: 5 August 1786
Ship	State	Description
Dolphin	Great Britain	The ship was driven ashore north of Helsingborg, Sweden. She was later refloated and taken in to Copenhagen, Denmark for repairs.
Florentia	Prussia	The ship foundered. Her crew were rescued. She was on a voyage from Königsberg to Dort, Dutch Republic.

=== 6 August ===
List of shipwrecks: 6 August 1786
Ship	State	Description
Unnamed	Flag unknown	The sloop foundered in the North Sea. Her crew were rescued by Fly (Great Britain).

=== 29 August ===
List of shipwrecks: 29 August 1786
Ship	State	Description
Three Cranes	Great Britain	The ship foundered in the Atlantic Ocean (approximately 37°N 60°W) whilst on a voyage from Jamaica to London. Her crew were rescued.

=== 30 August ===
List of shipwrecks: 30 August 1786
Ship	State	Description
Nelly	Great Britain	The ship was driven out of Dominica in a storm. No further trace, presumed foundered with the loss of all hands.

=== 31 August ===
List of shipwrecks: 31 August 1786
Ship	State	Description
Trial	Great Britain	The ship departed from Saint Vincent. No further trace, presumed foundered with the loss of all hands.

=== Unknown date ===
List of shipwrecks: Unknown date in August 1786
Ship	State	Description
Aid	Great Britain	The ship capsized at Liverpool, Lancashire.
Ann	United States	The ship was lost off Long Island, New York in early August. She was on a voyage from L'Orient, France to a port in New England.
Ann Marian	Ireland	The ship was driven ashore in Loch Crinan. She was on a voyage from Dublin to Riga, Russia.
Mary Ann	Great Britain	The ship was lost near Long Island, Rhode Island, United States. She was on a voyage from L'Orient, France to a port in New England, United States.
Nancy	Ireland	The ship was driven ashore on the coast of Scotland. She was on a voyage from Memel, Prussia to an Irish port.
Peggy	Great Britain	The ship was lost near Kirkwall, Orkney Islands. She was on a voyage from Liverpool to Narva, Russia.
Resolution	Great Britain	The ship was driven ashore and wrecked at "Holmstadt", Sweden. She was on a voyage from Memel to London.

== September ==
=== 2 September ===
List of shipwrecks: 2 September 1786
Ship	State	Description
Braithwaite	Great Britain	The full-rigged ship was wrecked at Barbados with the loss of a crew member.
Bridgetown	(Kingdom of Great Britain) Barbados	The brig was driven ashore andwrecked at Barbados.
Generous Planter	Great Britain	The full-rigged ship was wrecked at Barbados. She was on a voyage from Barbados to Bristol, Gloucestershire.
Hibernia	Ireland	The full-rigged ship was wrecked at Barbados.
Industry	Great Britain	The sloop was driven ashore at Barbados. She was later refloated.
Isabella	Ireland	The brig was driven ashore and wrecked at Barbados. She was on a voyage from Barbados to Cork.
James	Great Britain	The sloop was driven ashore at Barbados. She was later refloated.
Mary	Great Britain	The schooner departed from Tobago for London. No further trace, presumed foundered with the loss of all hands.
Speedwell	Great Britain	The brig was driven ashore at Barbados. She was later refloated.
Townsend	Great Britain	The full-rigged ship was wrecked at Barbados. She was on a voyage from Barbados to London.
William	Great Britain	The brig was driven ashore at Barbados.

=== 3 September ===
List of shipwrecks: 3 September 1786
Ship	State	Description
Cruger	United States	The ship was wrecked on the Horseshoe Reef, off Anegada, Virgin Islands. She was on a voyage from Philadelphia, Pennsylvania to Saint Croix, Virgin Islands.
Jackson	Great Britain	The ship foundered in the Irish Sea with the loss of all hands. She was on a voyage from St. Ubes, Portugal to Limerick, Ireland.

=== 5 September ===
List of shipwrecks: 5 September 1786
Ship	State	Description
Cruger	(flag) United States	The ship was wrecked on the Horse Shoe. She was on a voyage from Philadelphia, Pennsylvania to Santa Cruz.

=== 8 September ===
List of shipwrecks: 8 September 1786
Ship	State	Description
Sally	Great Britain	The ship was lost on the Wicklow Banks, in the Irish Sea. She was on a voyage from Liverpool, Lancashire to New York, United States.
'Unnamed	Spain	The ship was wrecked at Bray Head, County Wicklow, Kingdom of Ireland. Her thirteen crew were rescued. She was on a voyage from Cádiz to Bray, County Wicklow.
Unnamed	France	The hoveller capsized off Winchelsea, Sussex, Great Britain with the loss of all three crew.
Unnamed	Great Britain	The hoveller foundered in the English Channel with the loss of all hands. She was on a voyage from Boulogne, France to East Dean, Sussex.
Unnamed	Great Britain	The sloop was driven ashore at Hastings, Sussex. Her crew survived. She floated off and came ashore again. Subsequently placed under repair.

=== 14 September ===
List of shipwrecks: 14 September 1786
Ship	State	Description
Betsey	Great Britain	The sloop was wrecked at Easter Clyth 7 nautical miles (13 km) south of Wick, Caithness. All on board were rescued. She was on a voyage from Staxigoe, Caithness to Dunbar, Lothian.
Cadiz Packet	Great Britain	The ship was driven ashore in Stokes Bay. She was on a voyage from Hull, Yorkshire to Lisbon, Portugal. Cadiz Packet was later refloated and taken in to Portsmouth, Hampshire for repairs.

=== 15 September ===
List of shipwrecks: 15 September 1786
Ship	State	Description
Two Brothers	France	The ship was driven ashore and wrecked in Chale Bay. Her crew were rescued. She was on a voyage from Marennes to Dunkirk.

=== 16 September ===
List of shipwrecks: 16 September 1786
Ship	State	Description
Castlecrieve	Great Britain	The ship was driven ashore near Formby. Lancashire. She was on a voyage from Liverpool, Lancashire to the West Indies.

=== 22 September ===
List of shipwrecks: 22 September 1786
Ship	State	Description
La Laurette	France	The ship was wrecked at Havre de Grâce, Seine-Maritime.

=== 23 September ===
List of shipwrecks: 23 September 1786
Ship	State	Description
Nelly	Great Britain	The ship ran aground at Ostend, Dutch Republic and was wrecked. Her crew were rescued. She was on a voyage from Sunderland, County Durham to Middleburg, Zeeland, Dutch Republic.

=== 24 September ===
List of shipwrecks: 24 September 1786
Ship	State	Description
Four Brothers	Great Britain	The ship departed from Newfoundland, British America for Plymouth, Devon. No further trace, presumed foundered in the Atlantic Ocean with the loss of all hands.
Mercury	Great Britain	The ship was wrecked on a sandbank in the English Channel 6 nautical miles (11 km) off Dunkerque, France with the loss of all but three of the 113 people on board. Two of the survivors were rescued by a pilot boat.
Aleksandr Nevsky (Александр Невский, 'Alexander Nevsky')	Imperial Russian Navy	The Slava Yekateriny-class ship of the line ran aground and was wrecked at Cape Tarkhan-Kut. Her crew were rescued. She was on a voyage from Kherson to Sevastopol. Also mentioned as Svyatoy Aleksandr (Святой Александр, 'St. Alexander').

=== 27 September ===
List of shipwrecks: 27 September 1786
Ship	State	Description
General Melville	Great Britain	The ship was driven ashore at Saint-Quentin-au-Bosc, France. She was on a voyage from Dominica to London.

=== 28 September ===
List of shipwrecks: 28 September 1786
Ship	State	Description
Unnamed	Flag unknown	The packet ship was wrecked at Calais, France. All on board were rescued. She was on a voyage from Dover, Kent, Great Britain to Calais.

=== 29 September ===
List of shipwrecks: 29 September 1786
Ship	State	Description
Unnamed	Great Britain	The ship foundered off Saint-Quentin-en-Tourmont, France. Her 21 crew were rescued.

=== Unknown date ===
List of shipwrecks: Unknown date in September 1786
Ship	State	Description
Auspicious	Great Britain	The ship was wrecked on the Dutch coast with the loss of all but one of her crew.
Britannia	Great Britain	Captain Muirhead's ship was driven ashore and severely damaged in the Bristol Channel. She was later refloated.
Britannia	Great Britain	Captain Roberts's ship was driven ashore and wrecked near Padstow, Cornwall. She was on a voyage from London to Liverpool, Lancashire.
Brothers	Great Britain	The ship foundered in the Baltic Sea 5 leagues (15 nautical miles (28 km)) west of Hogland, Russia.
City of Seville	Spain	The ship was driven ashore east of Ostend, Dutch Republic. She was on a voyage from Seville to Ostend. She was later refloated and taken in to Ostend.
Columba Alba	Danzig	The ship was lost whilst on a voyage from Danzig to Liverpool.
Copenhagen	Denmark	The ship foundered in the Mediterranean Sea. Two of her crew were rescued by a Tuscan vessel.
Dartmouth	Great Britain	The ship was driven ashore at Pitcher's Point. She was refloated.
Diana	Ireland	The ship was driven ashore on the Dutch coast. She was on a voyage from Saint Petersburg, Russia to Cork.
John & Mary	Great Britain	The ship was driven ashore at Calais, France. She was on a voyage from Arkhangelsk, Russia to Falmouth, Cornwall. John & Mary was later refloated and taken in to Calais.
John and Thomas	Great Britain	The ship was driven ashore near "Strumstadt", Norway. She was on a voyage from Leith, Lothian to Saint Petersburg.
Mary	Great Britain	The ship was abandoned off the Virginia Capes, United States. Her crew were rescued by New Hope (Great Britain). Mary was on a voyage from London to Cádiz, Spain and Virginia.
Phebe	Great Britain	The ship was wrecked on the Falsterbo Reef, in the Baltic Sea. She was on a voyage from Aberdeen to Memel, Prussia.
Polly	Great Britain	The ship was wrecked on the coast of Norway with the loss of all but one of her crew. She was on a voyage from Saint Petersburg to Hull, Yorkshire.
Sea Otter	Great Britain	The 100-ton two-masted snow disappeared without trace after departing Snug Harbor Cove (60°45′N 146°39′W) in Russian Alaska in September sometime prior to 20 September.
Severn Packet	Great Britain	The ship sank in the Bengal River, India with the loss of all but one of her crew.
Speedwell	Great Britain	The ship departed from Placentia, Newfoundland, British America. No further trace, presumed foundered with the loss of all hands.
Young William	Great Britain	The ship ran aground in the Bristol Channel off The Mumbles, Glamorgan.

== October ==
=== 2 October ===
List of shipwrecks: 2 October 1786
Ship	State	Description
Unnamed	Denmark	The ship was wrecked near Shoreham-by-Sea, Sussex, Great Britain and sank with the loss of all but one of her crew and four of six would-be rescuers.

=== 4 October ===
List of shipwrecks: 4 October 1786
Ship	State	Description
Betsey	Ireland	The ship was wrecked on Sanday, Orkney Islands, Great Britain. She was on a voyage from Dram, Norway to The Rosses, County Donegal.
Unnamed	France	The brig was driven ashore at Reculver, Kent, Great Britain. She was on a voyage from Havre de Grâce, Frane to London, Great Britain. She was refloated and taken in to Margate, Kent.

=== 12 October ===
List of shipwrecks: 12 October 1786
Ship	State	Description
Unnamed	Great Britain	The brig was driven ashore at Newhaven, Sussex. She was refloated on 14 October.

=== 20 October ===
List of shipwrecks: 20 October 1786
Ship	State	Description
Brothers	Great Britain	The ship was driven ashore at Jamaica.
Hector	Great Britain	The ship was driven ashore at Jamaica.
Hope	Great Britain	The brig was driven into a hulk at Jamaica and was damaged.
Lady Charlotte	Great Britain	The ship was driven ashore at Jamaica.
Mercury	Great Britain	The ship was driven ashore at Jamaica.
Mercury Pacquet	Great Britain	The ship was driven ashore on Great Goat Island, Jamaica. She was later refloated.
Minerva	Great Britain	The brig was driven ashore at Jamaica.
New Betsey	Great Britain	The ship was driven ashore and wrecked at Jamaica.
Sally	Great Britain	The schooner capsized at Kingston, Jamaica during a gale with the loss of seven of the nine people on board.
Wilhelmina	Great Britain	The brig was driven ashore in Green Bay, Jamaica. She was refloated with the assistance of the Royal Navy.
Unnamed	Flag unknown	The shallop was wrecked off Gun Key, Jamaica with the loss of all on board.
Two unnamed vessels	Flags unknown	A full-rigged ship and a sloop were wrecked in Wreck Bay, Jamaica.
Two unnamed vessels	Flags unknown	A full-rigged ship and another vessel were wrecked at Portland Point, Jamaica.
Unnamed	Great Britain	The plantain boat foundered off Port Morant, Jamaica with the loss of all but one of her crew.
Unnamed	Flag unknown	The ship was wrecked at the mouth of the Salt Pond River, Jamaica.
Unnamed	Flag unknown	The schooner was driven ashore at Bull Bay, Jamaica.

=== 24 October ===
List of shipwrecks: 24 October 1786
Ship	State	Description
Betsey	Great Britain	The ship was lost at Renewse, Newfoundland.

=== 28 October ===
List of shipwrecks: 28 October 1786
Ship	State	Description
Hendrick and Jacob	Hamburg	The ship was wrecked on the Goodwin Sands, Kent, Great Britain. She was on a voyage from Altona, Hamburg to Barcelona, Spain.

=== Unknown Date ===
List of shipwrecks: Unknown date in October 1786
Ship	State	Description
America	United States	The ship was driven ashore and wrecked near Creden Head, County Waterford, Ireland. She was on a voyage from Cape Fear, North Carolina to Erskine, Renfrewshire, Great Britain.
Catharina	Sweden	The ship was lost near Marstrand. She was on a voyage from Bordeaux, France to Stralsund.
Dispatch	Ireland	The ship was driven ashore at Hoylake, Cheshire, Great Britain.
General Washington	Republic of Genoa	The ship was abandoned off Cape Spartel, Morocco. She was on a voyage from Nice, France to Philadelphia, Pennsylvania, United States.
Glory	Great Britain	The ship was driven ashore in the River Thames at Northfleet, Kent. She was on a voyage from Arkhangelsk, Russia to London.
Jane	Great Britain	The ship was wrecked on the Steen Stares, in the Gulf of Finland. She was on a voyage from Saint Petersburg, Russia to Leith, Lothian.
Johanna Cornelia	Sweden	The ship was lost near Marstrand.
Juno	Great Britain	The ship was wrecked on the Sandhammer, in the Baltic Sea. Her crew were rescued.
Lambkin	Great Britain	The ship departed from Newfoundland, British America for Pool, Dorset. No further trace, presumed foundered in the Atlantic Ocean with the loss of all hands.
Pitt	Great Britain	The ship was run down and sunk in the Baltic Sea by Hope (Great Britain). Her crew were rescued.
Prosperous	Great Britain	The ship was driven ashore at Margate, Kent. she was on a voyage from Porto, Portugal to London. Prosperous was later refloated.
Two unnamed vessels	France	The West Indiamen foundered in the English Channel off Havre de Grâce.
Two unnamed vessels	Ireland	The fishing vessels foundered in Galway Bay in mid-October. Their crews were rescued.

== November ==
=== 3 November ===
List of shipwrecks: 3 November 1786
Ship	State	Description
Kettle Bender	Great Britain	The ship departed from Newfoundland. No further trace, presumed foundered with the loss of all hands.

=== 6 November ===
List of shipwrecks: 6 November 1786
Ship	State	Description
New London	Great Britain	The ship ran aground on the Cutler Sand, in the North Sea off the coast of Suffolk and was severely damaged. She was on a voyage from London to Stockholm, Sweden. New London was taken in to Bawdsey, Suffolk.

=== 14 November ===
List of shipwrecks: 14 November 1786
Ship	State	Description
L'Aimable Marthe	France	The ship foundered in the Bristol Channel. Her crew were rescued.

=== 23 November ===
List of shipwrecks: 23 November 1786
Ship	State	Description
Thomas and William	Great Britain	The ship was lost near Campbeltown, Argyllshire with the loss of two of her crew. She was on a voyage from Bordeaux, France to Liverpool, Lancashire.

=== 26 November ===
List of shipwrecks: 26 November 1786
Ship	State	Description
Gibraltar	Great Britain	The ship ran aground on the Goodwin Sands, Kent. She was refloated.
Le Fry	France	The ship foundered off Cordovan. Her crew were rescued.

=== 28 November ===
List of shipwrecks: 28 November 1786
Ship	State	Description
Notre Dame de Grâce	France	The ship was lost at D'Arcachon with the loss of three of her crew. She was on a voyage from Dunkirk to Bordeaux.

=== 30 November ===
List of shipwrecks: 30 November 1786
Ship	State	Description
Fly	United States	The ship was lost at La Rochelle, France. She was on a voyage from Philadelphia, Pennsylvania to Bordeaux, France.
Le Pressigny	France	The ship was wrecked at Saint-Vaast-la-Hougue.

=== Unknown date ===
List of shipwrecks: Unknown date in November 1786
Ship	State	Description
Anna Christina	Sweden	The ship capsized in the North Sea. She was subsequently towed in to Pegwell Bay crewless.
Anna Elizabeth	Russia	The ship ran aground on the Goodwin Sands, Kent, Great Britain. She was taken in to Ramsgate, where she sank due to damage sustained.
Bonavista	Great Britain	The ship departed from Newfoundland, British America for Porto. No further trace, presumed foundered in the Atlantic Ocean with the loss of all hands.
Britannia	Great Britain	The ship was driven ashore and wrecked at Winterton-on-Sea, Norfolk. She was on a voyage from Bremen to London.
British Queen	Great Britain	The ship was driven ashore near St. Lucar, Spain. she was on a voyage from Quebec, British America to the Strait of Gibraltar.
Charlotte	Great Britain	The ship was lost on the coast of Scotland. She was on a voyage from Málaga, Spain to Liverpool, Lancashire.
Congress	United States	The ship was abandoned in the Atlantic Ocean. She was on a voyage from Bordeaux, France to Philadelphia, Pennsylvania.
Enterprize	Ireland	The ship was driven ashore and wrecked at Duncannon, County Wexford. Her crew were rescued. She was on a voyage from Cádiz, Spain to Dublin.
Glasgow	Great Britain	The ship was driven ashore near Lowestoft, Suffolk. She was on a voyage from Carron, Stirlingshire to London.
Hope	Great Britain	The ship ran aground on the Maplin Sand, in the North Sea off the coast of Essex. She was later refloated and taken in to the River Thames.
King George	Great Britain	The ship was driven ashore and wrecked at Bawdsey, Suffolk. She was on a voyage from London to Rotterdam, South Holland, Dutch Republic.
L'Amiable Marie	France	The ship was wrecked on Drake's Island, Devon, Great Britain. She was on a voyage from Newfoundland, British America to Grandville.
Lowestoffe	Great Britain	The ship was driven ashore near "Draken". She was on a voyage from Memel, Prussia to London.
Nymph	Great Britain	The ship was driven ashore and wrecked at Boulogne, France. She was on a voyage from Lisbon, Portugal to London.
Prince of Orange	Great Britain	The ship was driven ashore at Barcelona, Spain. She was on a voyage from "Saloe" to London.
Providence	Great Britain	The ship was driven ashore at Calais, France.
Providence	Great Britain	The ship was driven ashore at Saltfleet, Lincolnshire with the loss of her captain. She was on a voyage from Saint Petersburg, Russia to Hull, Yorkshire.
Thornton	Great Britain	The ship was driven ashore and wrecked 5 leagues (15 nautical miles (28 km)) from Kronstadt, Russia. She was on a voyage from Lisbon to Saint Petersburg.
Three Friends	Great Britain	The ship was lost at Beaumaris, Anglesey. She was on a voyage from Saint Petersburg to Liverpool.
Two Sisters	Great Britain	The ship was wrecked on the Maplin Sand, in the North Sea off the coast of Essex

== December ==
=== 2 December ===
List of shipwrecks: 2 December 1786
Ship	State	Description
Friendship	Great Britain	The ship foundered in the Bay of Biscay off Bayonne, France. She was on a voyage from the Shetland Islands to Alicante, Spain.

=== 6 December ===
List of shipwrecks: 6 December 1786
Ship	State	Description
St. Austle	Great Britain	The sloop was wrecked at Brighthelmstone, Sussex with loss of life.

=== 8 December ===
List of shipwrecks: 8 December 1786
Ship	State	Description
Swallow	Great Britain	The ship foundered in the Atlantic Ocean with the loss of two of her crew. Survivors were rescued by Brothers (Great Britain). Swallow was on a voyage from America to Greenock, Renfrewshire.
Vriendschap	Dutch Republic	The ship was wrecked near Galley Head, County Cork, Ireland with the loss of two of her crew. She was on a voyage from the Essequibo River to Middelburg, Zeeland.

=== 10 December ===
List of shipwrecks: 10 December 1786
Ship	State	Description
Thistle	Great Britain	The ship was wrecked in the Kenmare River, Ireland. She was on a voyage from Cork to Málaga, Spain.

=== 14 December ===
List of shipwrecks: 14 December 1786
Ship	State	Description
L'Amphitrite	French Navy	The fifth rate frigate sank at the Île de France, Mauritius. She was later refloated, repaired and returned to service.
L'Aurore	French Navy	The fifth rate frigate was driven ashore at the Île de France. She was later refloated and returned to service.
La Colombe	(Kingdom of France) French East India Company	The East Indiaman sank at the Île de France.
L'Actiff	(Kingdom of France) French East India Company	The East Indiaman sank at the Île de France. She was refloated.
La Fidele	(Kingdom of France) Mauritius	The ship was driven ashore at the Île de France.
La Rosalie	(Kingdom of France) French East India Company	The East Indiaman sank at the Île de France. She was refloated within three weeks.
L'Astrée	(Kingdom of France) French East India Company	The East Indiaman sank at the Île de France. She was refloated.
Le Bien Amis	(Kingdom of France) French East India Company	The East Indiaman was lost at the Île de France.
Le Bons Amis	(Kingdom of France) French East India Company	The East Indiaman was lost at the Île de France.
Le Boukons	(Kingdom of France) Mauritius	The ship sank at the Île de France. She was refloated within three weeks.
Le Chancellor Du Brabant	(Kingdom of France) French East India Company	The East Indiaman was driven ashore and severely damaged at the Île de France.
Le Colon	(Kingdom of France) French East India Company	The East Indiaman sank at the Île de France. She was refloated within three weeks.
Le Compte D'Artois	(Kingdom of France) French East India Company	The East Indiaman was lost at the Île de France.
Le Consalateur	(Kingdom of France) French East India Company	The East Indiaman sank at the Île de France. She was refloated within three weeks.
Le David	(Kingdom of France) French East India Company	The East Indiaman was lost at the Île de France.
Le Louisa	(Kingdom of France) Mauritius	The ship was lost at the Île de France.
Le Maria Jeaune	(Kingdom of France) Mauritius	The ship was driven ashore at the Île de France.
Le Pacifique	(Kingdom of France) French East India Company	The East Indiaman was lost at the Île de France.
Le Telemaque	(Kingdom of France) French East India Company	The East Indiaman was driven ashore at the Île de France.
L'St Esprit	(Kingdom of France) French East India Company	The East Indiaman sank at the Île de France. She was refloated within three weeks.
Sykes	Great Britain	The ship was driven ashore near Seaford, Sussex. Her crew were rescued. She was on a voyage from Rouen, France to Dublin.

=== 15 December ===
List of shipwrecks: 15 December 1786
Ship	State	Description
Robert	Great Britain	The ship was driven ashore and sank near the Black Rock, in Liverpool Bay. She was on a voyage from Barbados to Liverpool, Lancashire

=== 16 December ===
List of shipwrecks: 16 December 1786
Ship	State	Description
Lebed (Лебедь, 'Swan')	Imperial Russian Navy	The galiot was driven ashore and wrecked in the Dniester Estuary near Akkerman. Her crew survived.
Petersfield	Great Britain	The ship was in collision with Judith (Great Britain) off the coast of Kent and foundered. Her crew were rescued by Judith. Petersfield was on a voyage from London to Jamaica.

=== 17 December ===
List of shipwrecks: 17 December 1786
Ship	State	Description
Whalefisher	Great Britain	The whaler was driven ashore and wrecked in Broad Bay, Stornoway, Isle of Lewis with the loss of four of her crew.

=== 23 December ===
List of shipwrecks: 23 December 1786
Ship	State	Description
Anna	Sweden	The ship was lost near Cádiz, Spain. She was on a voyage from Barcelona, Spain to Gothenburg.

=== 24 December ===
List of shipwrecks: 24 December 1786
Ship	State	Description
Adventure	Great Britain	The ship was driven ashore near Cádiz, Spain. She was on a voyage from Valencia, Spain to London. Adventure was refloated in January 1787 and taken in to Cádiz Bay.
Joseph	Great Britain	The ship foundered in The Swin. Her crew were rescued. She was on a voyage from Memel, Prussia to London.
Success	Great Britain	The ship was driven ashore at Dublin, Ireland.

=== 27 December ===
List of shipwrecks: 27 December 1786
Ship	State	Description
Molly	Great Britain	The ship was driven ashore and wrecked on the south coast of Sicily. She was on a voyage from Zant, Venetian Republic to London.

=== Unknown date ===
List of shipwrecks: Unknown in December date 1786
Ship	State	Description
Ann	Great Britain	The ship was driven ashore near Dundalk, County Louth, Ireland. She was on a voyage from Liverpool, Lancashire to Newry, County Antrim, Ireland.
Benjamin	Great Britain	The ship was lost near Weymouth, Dorset. She was on a voyage from Weymouth to London.
Betsey	Great Britain	The ship was driven ashore at Tingmouth, Devon.
Capelin	Great Britain	The ship was lost near Figueira da Foz, Portugal.
Christian Hendrick	Dutch Republic	The ship was driven ashore and wrecked in Deadman's Bay, Devon. Her crew were rescued. She was on a voyage from Rotterdam to Barcelona, Spain.
Congress	United States	The ship foundered in the Atlantic Ocean. Her crew were rescued by Prince Frederick (Great Britain), which sprang a leak three days later and was abandoned. The crews from both ships reached Flores Island, Azores. Congress was on a voyage from a French port to Philadelphia, Pennsylvania. Prince Frederick was on a voyage from New York, United States to London.
Dame Maria Anne	Spain	The ship was wrecked on the Spanish coast. She was on a voyage from a port in Catalonia to Cádiz.
Fletcher	Great Britain	The ship was driven ashore at Limerick, Ireland. She was on a voyage from Virginia, United States to London.
Grenada Packet	Great Britain	The ship was driven ashore and sank at Liverpool. She was on a voyage from Grenada to Liverpool.
Gryfraald	Sweden	The brig was driven ashore at Gibraltar. She was on a voyage from Sicily to Lisbon, Portugal.
Hercules	Great Britain	The ship was lost near Bilbao, Spain.
Hercules	Great Britain	The ship foundered in the Baltic Sea off "Derwinde". She was on a voyage from Riga, Russia to Dundee, Perthshire.
Industry	Great Britain	The ship was lost on the Nass Sand, in the Bristol Channel. She was on a voyage from Waterford, Ireland to Bristol, Gloucestershire.
Industry	Great Britain	The ship was driven ashore at Figueira da Foz.
Johannes Francisco	Dutch Republic	The ship was driven ashore near Dartmouth, Devon. Her crew were rescued. She was on a voyage from Rotterdam to Gibraltar.
Juno	Dutch Republic Navy	The fifth rate frigate was wrecked in Freshwater Bay, Isle of Wight with the loss of six of her crew.
L'Aimable Thèrese	France	The ship was wrecked at the Cape of Good Hope.
La Ville de Havre	France	The ship was wrecked near Cherbourg. She was on a voyage from Saint-Domingue to Cape Town, Dutch Cape Colony and Havre de Grâce.
Maria Christina	Flag unknown	The ship was wrecked at Poole, Dorset, Great Britain. She was on a voyage from Bordeaux, France to Stettin.
Messenger	Great Britain	The ship was lost in Blacksod Bay, County Mayo, Ireland. Her crew were rescued. She was on a voyage from Newfoundland, British America to an English port.
Mette Catharina	Russia	The ship was wrecked near Plymouth, Devon. Her crew were rescued. She was on a voyage from Saint Petersburg to Genoa.
Montgomery	Great Britain	The ship was wrecked on the Welsh coast. She was on a voyage from Newry to London.
Neptune	Great Britain	The ship became trapped by ice at Narva, Russia and was abandoned by her crew. She was on a voyage from Narva to Hull, Yorkshire.
Nostra Señora de Begona	Spain	The ship was wrecked near Newhaven, Sussex, Great Britain with the loss of five of her crew.
Ormond	Great Britain	The ship was lost near Wexford, Ireland. She was on a voyage from Liverpool to Africa.
Polly	Great Britain	The ship was driven ashore on the coast of Cornwall.
Polly	Great Britain	The ship was driven ashore at North Foreland, Kent. She was on a voyage from Rotterdam to London.
Providence	Great Britain	The ship sank at Bridlington, Yorkshire. She was on a voyage from Amsterdam, Dutch Republic to Hull.
Rebecca	Great Britain	The ship was lost at Plymouth. Her crew were rescued.
Rodney	Great Britain	The ship was lost on the coast of Ireland.
Sally	Great Britain	The ship was driven ashore between Waterford and Dungarvan, County Waterford, Ireland. She was on a voyage from Limerick to Pool, Dorset.
Samuel	Great Britain	The ship was lost in The Wash with the loss of all but one of her crew. She was on a voyage from Newcastle upon Tyne to Herne Bay, Kent.
St. Antonio	Spain	The ship departed from Carthagena, Viceroyalty of New Granada for Ferrol. No further trace, presumed foundered in the Atlantic Ocean with the loss of all hands.
Success	Great Britain	The ship was driven ashore on Texel, Dutch Republic. She was on a voyage from Newcastle upon Tyne, Northumberland to Hamburg.
Sophia	Great Britain	The ship was lost near Harwich, Essex. She was on a voyage from Ostend, Dutch Republic to London.
Three Brothers	Great Britain	The ship was driven ashore near Figueira da Foz.
Three Sisters	Great Britain	The ship was wrecked in the Swin. She was on a voyage from Saint Petersburgh to London.
Wallfish	Stettin	The ship was driven ashore on the coast of Jutland. She was on a voyage from Liverpool to Stettin.
Wasa	Russia	The ship was driven ashore on Terschelling, Dutch Republic. She was on a voyage from Riga to Lisbon and Porto, Portugal.
William and Mary	Great Britain	The ship was lost near Figueira da Foz.
Unnamed	Flag unknown	The ship was wrecked at Bonmahon, County Waterford, Ireland before 5 December.
Unnamed	Flag Unknown	The ship was driven ashore near Figueira da Foz.
Unnamed	Flag unknown	The schooner foundered off Figueira da Foz with the loss of all hands.

== Unknown date ==
List of shipwrecks: Unknown date in 1786
Ship	State	Description
Assistance	Great Britain	The ship was wrecked at the Black River, Belize.
Baton Rouge	Great Britain	The ship was lost on the coast of Cuba. She was on a voyage from Jamaica to New Orleans, Louisiana, New Spain.
Biscayner	Great Britain	The whaler was lost on the coast of Newfoundlan, British America.
Brabant	France	The ship was wrecked on Rodrigues, Mauritius. She was on a voyage from the Malabar Coast to France.
Bridget	Great Britain	The ship was lost.
Britannia	Great Britain	The ship was driven ashore and wrecked at the mouth of the Cape Fear River, South Carolina, United States.
Carleton	Great Britain	The ship was wrecked by a flood at "Pigu".
Carolina	Great Britain	The ship foundered in the Gulf of Florida. She was on a voyage from St. Marks, Florida, New Spain to Charleston, South Carolina and London.
Commerce	Great Britain	The ship foundered in the Atlantic Ocean whilst on a voyage from Savannah, Georgia, United States to Liverpool, Lancashire. Her crew were rescued.
Dolphin	Great Britain	The ship was lost on "Robert Island", off the Cape of Good Hope.
Flor de Naugacas	Portugal	The ship foundered in the Atlantic Ocean. Her crew were rescued by a Dutch vessel. She was on a voyage from Maranão, Brazil to Porto.
Friendship	Great Britain	The ship was wrecked on a reef off Antigua. Her crew were rescued. She was on a voyage from Bristol to the Musquito Shore and British Honduras.
Hansford	Great Britain	The brig was lost whilst on a voyage from Virginia, United States to Antigua.
Hawke	Great Britain	The ship was lost in the Bahamas. She was on a voyage from New Providence, New Jersey, United States to Jamaica.
Hector	Great Britain	The ship was lost at Jamaica.
Hindrick and Jacob	Hamburg	The ship ws wrecked on the Goodwin Sands, Kent, Great Britain.
Hope	Great Britain	The ship was wrecked on the east coast of Jamaica. She was on a voyage from Philadelphia, Pennsylvania, United States to Savanna-la-Mar, Jamaica.
Hope	United States	The ship foundered in the Atlantic Ocean. Her crew were rescued. She was on a voyage from Boston, Massachusetts to the West Indies and Virginia.
Hunter	Great Britain	The ship was wrecked on the coast of Brazil. Her crew were rescued.
Kitty	Great Britain	The ship was lost whilst on a voyage from Pool, Dorset to Newfoundland.
La Brunette de Nantes	France	The ship was wrecked on Aiglenau whilst of a voyage from Port-au-Prince, Hispaniola to France. Her crew were rescued.
Le Dolphin	France	The ship struck a rock and sank off the coast of Lower Siam with the loss of most of her crew.
Les Deux Amis de Havre	France	The ship was wrecked at Guernsey, Channel Islands.
Marquis de Voyer	France	The ship was lost whilst on a voyage from the West Indies to France.
Mary	Great Britain	The ship foundered in the Atlantic Ocean. She was on a voyage from Saint Lucia to Virginia.
Maryland Paquet	Great Britain	The ship was lost on the Virginia Capes, United States. She was on a voyage from London to Maryland, United States.
Nuestra Señora del Rosário	Spain	The ship was wrecked on Faial Island, Azores.
Peggy	Great Britain	The ship foundered in the Atlantic Ocean whilst on a voyage from Shelburne, Nova Scotia to New York, United States. Her crew were rescued by Patey Rutledge (Flag unknown)
Porgey	United States	The ship was wreckedin the Turks Islands. Her crew were rescued. She was on a voyage from New York to Jamaica.
Providence	Great Britain	The ship was abandoned in the Atlantic Ocean. Her crew were rescued by Friendship (Great Britain). Providence was on a voyage from Newfoundland to Cádiz.
Rebecca	Great Britain	The ship was lost in the Bengal River. She was on a voyage from Madras to Bengal, India.
Renuse	Great Britain	The ship was lost at Newfoundland.
Revenge	Great Britain	The ship was wrecked on Cape Breton Island, Nova Scotia.
Sally	Great Britain	The ship was lost in the Turks Islands. She was on a voyage from Jamaica to Maryland.
Santa Roza	Portugal	The ship was lost in the Chinese Sea. Her crew were rescued.
Success	Great Britain	The ship was wrecked off Dublin, Ireland.
Susannah	Great Britain	The ship was lost whilst on a voyage from Newfoundland to Passamaquoddy Bay, Maine, United States. She may have been the ship that sank at "Harbour De Lute" and was subsequently refloated.
Telemachus	United States	The ship was wrecked on the Isle of Sable. She was on a voyage from Georgia to Amsterdam, Dutch Republic.
Theodore de Nantes	France	The ship struck a rock and was wrecked.
True Briton	Great Britain	The ship was driven ashore and wrecked at Halifax, Nova Scotia, British America. She was on a voyage from a port in New Brunswick to Halifax.
True Briton	Great Britain	The ship was wrecked in the Baltic Sea.
Uu Terre Neuvier	France	The ship foundered in the Bay of Biscay off La Rochelle, France.
Warren's Town	Great Britain	The ship foundered in the Atlantic Ocean whilst on a voyage from Cork, Ireland to Cádiz, Spain. Her crew were rescued.
Unnamed	Dutch Republic	The ship struck a rock and sank off the coast of Lower Siam.
