= List of shipwrecks in February 1834 =

The list of shipwrecks in February 1834 includes ships sunk, foundered, wrecked, grounded or otherwise lost during February 1834.

== 1 February ==
List of shipwrecks: 1 February 1834
Ship	State	Description
HMS Undaunted	Royal Navy	The Lively-class frigate ran aground in the English Channel off Selsey Bill, Sussex. She was refloated the next day. HMS Undaunted was subsequently decommissioned.

== 2 February ==
List of shipwrecks: 2 February 1834
Ship	State	Description
Ann	United Kingdom	The sloop was in collision with John Deniston (United Kingdom) in the North Channel and sank. Her crew were rescued by John Densiton. Ann was on a voyage from Londonderry to Glasgow, Renfrewshire.
Mary and Jane	United Kingdom	The ship was wrecked on the Melmore Rocks. She was on a voyage from Londonderry to Campbeltown, Argyllshire.
Robert and Mary	United Kingdom	The ship was driven ashore in Dundalk Bay. She was on a voyage from Glasgow to Dundalk, County Louth.

== 3 February ==
List of shipwrecks: 3 February 1834
Ship	State	Description
Commerce	United Kingdom	The brig foundered in the Irish Sea off Ballymacaw, County Cork. There were six crew on board. She was on a voyage from Milford Haven, Pembrokeshire, to Cork.
Hibernia	United Kingdom	The ship was driven ashore at Musquash, New Brunswick, British North America. She was refloated on 18 February and taken in to Saint John, New Brunswick. Hibernia was on a voyage from Magaguadavic, New Brunswick, to Kinsale, County Cork.
Mary	United Kingdom	The ship was in collision with Commerce (United Kingdom) and sank in the Irish Sea off Holyhead, Anglesey. Mary was on a voyage from Liverpool, Lancashire, to Dingle, County Kerry.
Onderneming	Hamburg	The ship was driven ashore on Ameland, Friesland, Netherlands. She was on a voyage from Bordeaux, Gironde, France, to Hamburg.
Robert	(United Kingdom of Great Britain and Ireland) British North America	The ship foundered in the Irish Sea off Lambay Island, County Dublin, United Kingdom. She was on a voyage from Liverpool to Savannah, Georgia, United States or Havana, Cuba.

== 4 February ==
List of shipwrecks: 4 February 1834
Ship	State	Description
Flora	United Kingdom	The ship was driven ashore on Walney Island, Lancashire. She was on a voyage from Whithorn, Wigtownshire, to Lancaster, Lancashire.

== 5 February ==
List of shipwrecks: 5 February 1834
Ship	State	Description
Giulia	Russia	The brig was wrecked near Marseille, Bouches-du-Rhône, France.
Laure	France	The ship was driven ashore and wrecked at the mouth of the Ebro. She was on a voyage from Sète, Hérault to "Bahia".
Rapid	United Kingdom	The ship was run down and sunk in the River Thames at Gravesend, Kent, by Ardent (United Kingdom).

== 6 February ==
List of shipwrecks: 6 February 1834
Ship	State	Description
Betsey	United Kingdom	The smack was wrecked at Ayr. Her crew were rescued by the Ayr pilot boats.
Dee	United Kingdom	The ship was driven ashore at Ramsgate, Kent.
Mary and Eliza	United Kingdom	The ship was driven ashore at Ramsgate.
Xeres	France	The ship was wrecked off Camaret-sur-Mer, Finistère.

== 7 February ==
List of shipwrecks: 7 February 1834
Ship	State	Description
Robert	(United Kingdom of Great Britain and Ireland) British North America	The ship was abandoned in the Irish Sea off Rush, County Dublin, United Kingdom.

== 8 February ==
List of shipwrecks: 8 February 1834
Ship	State	Description
Ann	United Kingdom	The ship was run down and sunk in the English Channel off Dartmouth, Devon. Her crew were rescued. She was on a voyage from Penryn to Portsmouth, Hampshire.

== 9 February ==
List of shipwrecks: 9 February 1834
Ship	State	Description
Jean	United Kingdom	The ship was driven ashore and wrecked at Eyemouth, Berwickshire. She was on a voyage from Eyemouth to the Firth of Forth.
Maria	France	The ship was in collision with Patience (United Kingdom) in the Atlantic Ocean off A Coruña, Spain and foundered. Her crew were rescued by Patience. Maria was on a voyage from Sète, Hérault to Dunkerque, Nord.

== 10 February ==
List of shipwrecks: 10 February 1834
Ship	State	Description
Corsenside	United Kingdom	The ship was run down and sunk in the Irish Sea off Kinsale, County Cork, by Columbia (United States). Her crew were rescued. She was on a voyage from Liverpool to Trieste.
Giovanni	Kingdom of the Two Sicilies	The ship sank at Malta during a gale.
Mary Ann	United Kingdom	The ship departed from Stockton on Tees, County Durham, for London. No further trace, presumed foundered in the North Sea with the loss of all hands.
Mary Dalgleish	United Kingdom	The ship foundered off the Spanish coast. All on board were rescued. She was on a voyage from San Sebastián, Spain, to Puerto Rico.

== 11 February ==
List of shipwrecks: 11 February 1834
Ship	State	Description
Swiftsure	United Kingdom	The ship was driven ashore at Constantinople, Ottoman Empire.

== 12 February ==
List of shipwrecks: 12 February 1834
Ship	State	Description
Caroline	Belgium	The ship was driven ashore at Berck, Pas-de-Calais, France. Her crew were rescued. She was on a voyage from Rio de Janeiro, Brazil, to Antwerp.
Martha	United Kingdom	The ship was driven ashore near Emden, Kingdom of Hanover. She was on a voyage from Hamburg to La Rochelle, Charente-Maritime, France.

== 13 February ==
List of shipwrecks: 13 February 1834
Ship	State	Description
Adelaide	United Kingdom	The sloop was wrecked at Grenada.
Paragon	United Kingdom	The ship was wrecked on the Moran Reef.
Vriendschap	Hamburg	The ship was in collision with another vessel before 13 February and sank. She was on a voyage from Bordeaux, Gironde, France, to Amsterdam, North Holland, Netherlands.

== 14 February ==
List of shipwrecks: 14 February 1834
Ship	State	Description
Fortuna	Hamburg	The ship was capsized by ice in the Elbe. She was on a voyage from Rio de Janeiro, Brazil, to Hamburg.
Lardmans	United Kingdom	The ship ran aground at Fort Augusta, Jamaica.

== 15 February ==
List of shipwrecks: 15 February 1834
Ship	State	Description
Aigle	France	The whaler was lost near the Cape of Good Hope with the loss of three of her crew.
Fanny	France	The ship foundered. She was on a voyage from Puerto Rico to Martinique.
Providence	United Kingdom	The ship was wrecked on the Whiting Sand, in the North Sea off the coast of Suffolk. Her crew were rescued. She was on a voyage from Sunderland, County Durham, to Harwich, Essex.

== 16 February ==
List of shipwrecks: 16 February 1834
Ship	State	Description
Russel	United Kingdom	The ship was driven ashore and damaged at Shoreham-by-Sea, Sussex. She was on a voyage from Newcastle-upon-Tyne, Northumberland, to Shoreham-by-Sea. Russell was refloated on 19 February.

== 17 February ==
List of shipwrecks: 17 February 1834
Ship	State	Description
Catherina	Bremen	The galeass foundered off Borkum, Kingdom of Hanover.
Concordia	Denmark	The ship was wrecked at Hørsholm. She was on a voyage from Aarhus to Leith, Lothian, United Kingdom.
D'Uberville	France	The ship was wrecked on the Haisborough Sands, in the North Sea off the coast of Norfolk, United Kingdom.
Spitfire	United Kingdom	The ship was driven ashore and severely damaged at Leith, Lothian. She was on a voyage from Dundee, Forfarshire, to Anstruther, Fife.

== 18 February ==
List of shipwrecks: 18 February 1834
Ship	State	Description
Meteor	United Kingdom	The schooner was destroyed by the explosion of her cargo of gunpowder at Malta with the loss of 28 lives.
Neptune	Sweden	The ship was wrecked near Savannah, Georgia, United States.
HMS St Vincent	Royal Navy	The Nelson-class ship of the line was severely damaged by the explosion of Meteor (United Kingdom) and driven aground. She was refloated on 21 February after discharging all her 120 cannon. HMS St Vincent was subsequently repaired and returned to service.

== 19 February ==
List of shipwrecks: 19 February 1834
Ship	State	Description
Amy	United Kingdom	The ship was lost on the Kentish Knock, in the North Sea off the coast of Kent. She was opn a voyage from Sunderland, County Durham, to New York, United States.
Ceylon	(United Kingdom of Great Britain and Ireland) New South Wales	The cutter was wrecked near Newcastle.
Expedition	United Kingdom	The ship was driven onto rocks near Blyth, Northumberland.
Mary	United Kingdom	The ship sprang a leak and foundered in the Raz de Sein. Her crew were rescued by Renard (France). She was on a voyage from St. Ives, Cornwall, to Ancona, Papal States.
Mary and Nancy	United States	The ship was abandoned in the Atlantic Ocean (39°N 64°W). She was on a voyage from New York to Demerara.

== 20 February ==
List of shipwrecks: 20 February 1834
Ship	State	Description
Mary Ann	United Kingdom	The ship departed from Stockton-on-Tees, County Durham, for London. She subsequently foundered in the North Sea off Flamborough Head, Yorkshire, with the loss of all hands.

== 21 February ==
List of shipwrecks: 21 February 1834
Ship	State	Description
James	United Kingdom	The ship was driven ashore on Islay, Inner Hebrides.

== 22 February ==
List of shipwrecks: 22 February 1834
Ship	State	Description
Columbia	flag unknown	The ship was driven ashore at Algeciras, Spain. She was on a voyage from Puerto Rico to Marseille, Bouches-du-Rhône, France.
St. Auben	United Kingdom	The ship foundered in Liverpool Bay. Her crew were rescued. She was on a voyage from Galway to Liverpool, Lancashire.
Unity	United Kingdom	The ship was driven ashore at Rye, Sussex. She was on a voyage from Newcastle upon Tyne, Northumberland, to Rye.

== 23 February ==
List of shipwrecks: 23 February 1834
Ship	State	Description
Joseph and Ann	United Kingdom	The ship was driven ashore at Wells-next-the-Sea, Norfolk.

== 26 February ==
List of shipwrecks: 26 February 1834
Ship	State	Description
Richmond	United Kingdom	The ship departed from Sligo for London. No further trace, presumed foundered with the loss of all hands.
Tyne	United Kingdom	The ship ran aground on the Newton Rock. She floated off the next day but consequently foundered in the North Sea. Her crew survived. Tyne was on a voyage from Newcastle upon Tyne, Northumberland, to Leith, Lothian.

== 27 February ==
List of shipwrecks: 27 February 1834
Ship	State	Description
Merry Maid	United Kingdom	The ship foundered in the English Channel off Folkestone, Kent. All on board were rescued by a Board of Customs cutter.
Valentine	United Kingdom	The ship was driven ashore and sank in Sandyhaven Bay. She was on a voyage from Milford Haven, Pembrokeshire, to Gloucester. Valentine was refloated on 12 March and taken in to Milford Haven for repairs.

== 28 February ==
List of shipwrecks: 28 February 1834
Ship	State	Description
Catherine	Kingdom of Hanover	The ship was driven ashore on the coast of the Isle of Man. She was on a voyage from Liverpool, Lancashire, United Kingdom, to Leer.
Jean	United Kingdom	The ship was driven ashore and wrecked at Eyemouth, Berwickshire.
Newton	United Kingdom	The ship was driven ashore in Drogheda Bay. She was on a voyage from Liverpool to Boston, Massachusetts, United States.
Providence	United Kingdom	The sloop struck the North Carr, in the Firth of Forth and sank. She was on a voyage from Newcastle upon Tyne, Northumberland, to Perth.
Vesta	United Kingdom	The ship departed from Sligo for London. No further trace, presumed foundered with the loss of all hands.

== Unknown date ==
List of shipwrecks: Unknown date in February 1834
Ship	State	Description
Argus	United States	The ship was in collision with Henry Brougham (United Kingdom) in the Mediterranean Sea off Marbella, Spain, and sank. She was on a voyage from Virginia to Málaga, Spain.
British Hero	United Kingdom	The ship foundered off Gothenburg, Sweden, on or before 20 February.
Constant Trader	United Kingdom	The ship foundered off Gothenburg on or before 20 February.
Coriolanus	United Kingdom	The ship was driven ashore at Étaples, Pas-de-Calais, France. She was on a voyage from Demerara to London. Coriolanus was refloated on 11 February and taken in to Saint-Valery-sur-Somme, Somme, France.
Eliza	United Kingdom	The ship was driven ashore on Ameland, Friesland, Netherlands. She was on a voyage from Hull, Yorkshire, to Hamburg.
Frithioft	Denmark	The ship capsized in the North Sea off Rasvåg, Norway, on or before 8 February.
Maria Johanna	flag unknown	The ship foundered in the Atlantic Ocean (47°N 10°W). Her crew were rescued.
Martha	Hamburg	The ship was driven ashore near "Eden". She was on a voyage from Hamburg to La Rochelle, Charente-Maritime.
Monitor	(United Kingdom of Great Britain and Ireland) New South Wales	The cutter was wrecked at Newcastle, New South Wales.
Rosina	United Kingdom	The ship was in collision with Lord Stanley and sank. Her crew were saved. She was on a voyage from Liverpool, Lancashire, to Constantinople, Ottoman Empire.
Stephanie	France	The ship was driven ashore at Fredrikshavn, Denmark.
Vine	United Kingdom	The ship departed from Galway for London. No further trace, presumed foundered with the loss of all hands.
Vriendschap	Netherlands	The ship was in collision with another vessel and foundered in the North Sea off Hamburg before 13 February. She was on a voyage from Bordeaux, Gironde, France, to Amsterdam, North Holland.
