= List of shipwrecks in May 1831 =

The list of shipwrecks in May 1831 includes ships sunk, foundered, grounded, or otherwise lost during May 1831.

== 4 May ==
List of shipwrecks: 4 May 1831
Ship	State	Description
Archibald	United Kingdom	The ship was driven ashore and wrecked at Sandhamn, Sweden.

== 5 May ==
List of shipwrecks: 5 May 1831
Ship	State	Description
Janet	United Kingdom	The ship was driven ashore at Fraserburgh, Aberdeenshire. Her crew were rescued by the Fraserburgh Lifeboat.
Mary Ann	United Kingdom	The schooner was in collision with a brig and sank with the loss of three of her five crew. she was on a voyage from Portaferry, County Down to Campbeltown, Argyllshire.

== 9 May ==
List of shipwrecks: 9 May 1831
Ship	State	Description
Hero	United Kingdom	The ship was wrecked on St. Paul's Island, Nova Scotia, British North America. Her crew were rescued.

== 10 May ==
List of shipwrecks: 10 May 1831
Ship	State	Description
Sarah	United Kingdom	The ship foundered off Skagen, Denmark.

== 11 May ==
List of shipwrecks: 11 May 1831
Ship	State	Description
Jessie	(United Kingdom of Great Britain and Ireland) New South Wales	The sloop was wrecked off Newcastle. Her crew were rescued.
John	United Kingdom	The ship was wrecked in Jank's Sound, off Milford Haven, Pembrokeshire. Her crew were rescued.
Union	United Kingdom	The ship was lost on the East Barrow Sand, in the North Sea off the coast of Essex. All on board were rescued by the cutter Area (United Kingdom).

== 12 May ==
List of shipwrecks: 12 May 1831
Ship	State	Description
Doris	United Kingdom	The ship sprang a leak and was abandoned in the Atlantic Ocean. Lady Ridley (United Kingdom) rescued the crew.
Duke of York	United Kingdom	The ship was wrecked at Madeira, Portugal.
George	(United Kingdom of Great Britain and Ireland) Cape Colony	The cutter was wrecked on Dyer Island. Her crew were rescued.

== 13 May ==
List of shipwrecks: 13 May 1831
Ship	State	Description
Mary Ann	United Kingdom	The brig capsized off Hiiumaa, Russia with some loss of life.

== 14 May ==
List of shipwrecks: 14 May 1831
Ship	State	Description
Fleece	United Kingdom	The schooner was wrecked on Scroby Sands, in the North Sea off the coast of Norfolk. Her crew were rescued by HMS Royal Charlotte (Royal Navy). She was on a voyage from Boston, Lincolnshire to London.
Washington	United States	The 180-foot (55 m), 339-gross register ton sidewheel paddle steamer sank in 60 feet (18 m) of water in Long Island Sound off Stratford, Connecticut, within 15 minutes of colliding in darkness with the steamer Chancellor Livingston (flag unknown). Chancellor Livingston rescued all 52 of Washington′s passengers.

== 15 May ==
List of shipwrecks: 15 May 1831
Ship	State	Description
Rattler	United Kingdom	The ship foundered in the Arctic Sea. Her crew were rescued. She was on a voyage from Sunderland, County Durham to Arkhangelsk, Russia.

== 17 May ==
List of shipwrecks: 17 May 1831
Ship	State	Description
Pero	United Kingdom	The ship was driven ashore at North Somercotes, Lincolnshire. She was on a voyage from London to Hull, Yorkshire.

== 19 May ==
List of shipwrecks: 19 May 1831
Ship	State	Description
Coosa	United States	The steamboat collided with Huntress (United States) and sank in the Mississippi River 90 miles (140 km) downstream of the mouth of the Ohio River with the loss of eight lives. She was on a voyage from New Orleans, Louisiana to Louisville, Kentucky.
Henrick	Hamburg	The three-masted barque capsized in the River Thames at St. Katherine's Dock, London, United Kingdom. Her twenty crew survived. She was refloated later that day.
Thorne	United Kingdom	The ship was wrecked on Robin Island, Cape Colony. She was on a voyage from the Cape Colony to London.

== 20 May ==
List of shipwrecks: 20 May 1831
Ship	State	Description
Lively	United Kingdom	The ship capsized and sank off "Huen Island". Her crew were rescued. She was on a voyage from Pillau, Prussia to Ramsey, Isle of Man.

== 22 May ==
List of shipwrecks: 22 May 1831
Ship	State	Description
Prosperous	United Kingdom	The ship was wrecked and sank on the north coast of Guernsey, Channel Islands. Her crew were rescued. She was on a voyage from Weymouth, Dorset to Guernsey.

== 23 May ==
List of shipwrecks: 23 May 1831
Ship	State	Description
Ruby	United Kingdom	The ship was wrecked on Cape Sable Island, Nova Scotia, British North America. Her crew were rescued. She was on a voyage from Poole, Dorset to St. Andrews, New Brunswick, British North America.

== 24 May ==
List of shipwrecks: 24 May 1831
Ship	State	Description
Hercules	United Kingdom	The ship was lost on the Corton Sand, in the North Sea off the coast of Suffolk. She was on a voyage from Dominica to London.
Lady Cathcart	United Kingdom	The ship was destroyed by fire at Kingston, Jamaica.
Windart	United Kingdom	The ship was lost on the Corton Sand.

== 25 May ==
List of shipwrecks: 25 May 1831
Ship	State	Description
Sarah	United Kingdom	The ship was driven ashore at Lossiemouth, Inverness-shire where she subsequently became a wreck.

== 26 May ==
List of shipwrecks: 26 May 1831
Ship	State	Description
Cape Breton	Spain	The ship was destroyed by fire at Liverpool, Lancashire, United Kingdom.
Mary Porter	United Kingdom	The ship was wrecked on Cape Sable Island, Nova Scotia, British North America. She was on a voyage from Liverpool, Lancashire to Saint John, New Brunswick, British North America.
Sir Charles Ogle	(United Kingdom of Great Britain and Ireland) British North America	The ship was lost west of Halifax, Nova Scotia. She was on a voyage from Demerara to Halifax.

== 27 May ==
List of shipwrecks: 27 May 1831
Ship	State	Description
Governor Hodgson	United Kingdom	The ship was wreckled at County Harbour, Nova Scotia, British North America. She was on a voyage from Bermuda to Quebec City, Lower Canada, British North America.
Mary	United Kingdom	The ship was wrecked on Anholt, Denmark. Her crew were rescued. She was on a voyage from Riga, Russia to London.

== Unknown date ==
List of shipwrecks: Unknown date 1831
Ship	State	Description
Devenant	France	The ship was driven ashore in the Bay of Anthie in early May. Her crew were rescued. She was on a voyage from Havre de Grâce, Seine-Inférieure to Hamburg.
Maria	United Kingdom	The ship was captured in the Atlantic Ocean off the coast of Africa by a 10-gun Spanish pirate brig. Most of her crew were murdered and the ship was scuttled.
Mina	United Kingdom	The ship foundered in the North Sea approximately 20 nautical miles (37 km) north of Kinnaird Head, Aberdeenshire. Her crew were rescued. She was on a voyage from Ballachulish, Inverness-shire to Dundee, Forfarshire.
Mersey	United Kingdom	The ship was wrecked on "The Triangles" before 25 May. She was on a voyage from Liverpool, Lancashire, to Veracruz, Mexico.
HMS Monkey	Royal Navy	The schooner was wrecked at Tampico, Mexico. Her crew were rescued.
Providence	United Kingdom	The ship foundered in the Atlantic Ocean whilst on a voyage from Liverpool to Newfoundland, British North America. Her crew were rescued.
