= Eric Owen Moss =

American architect (born 1943)

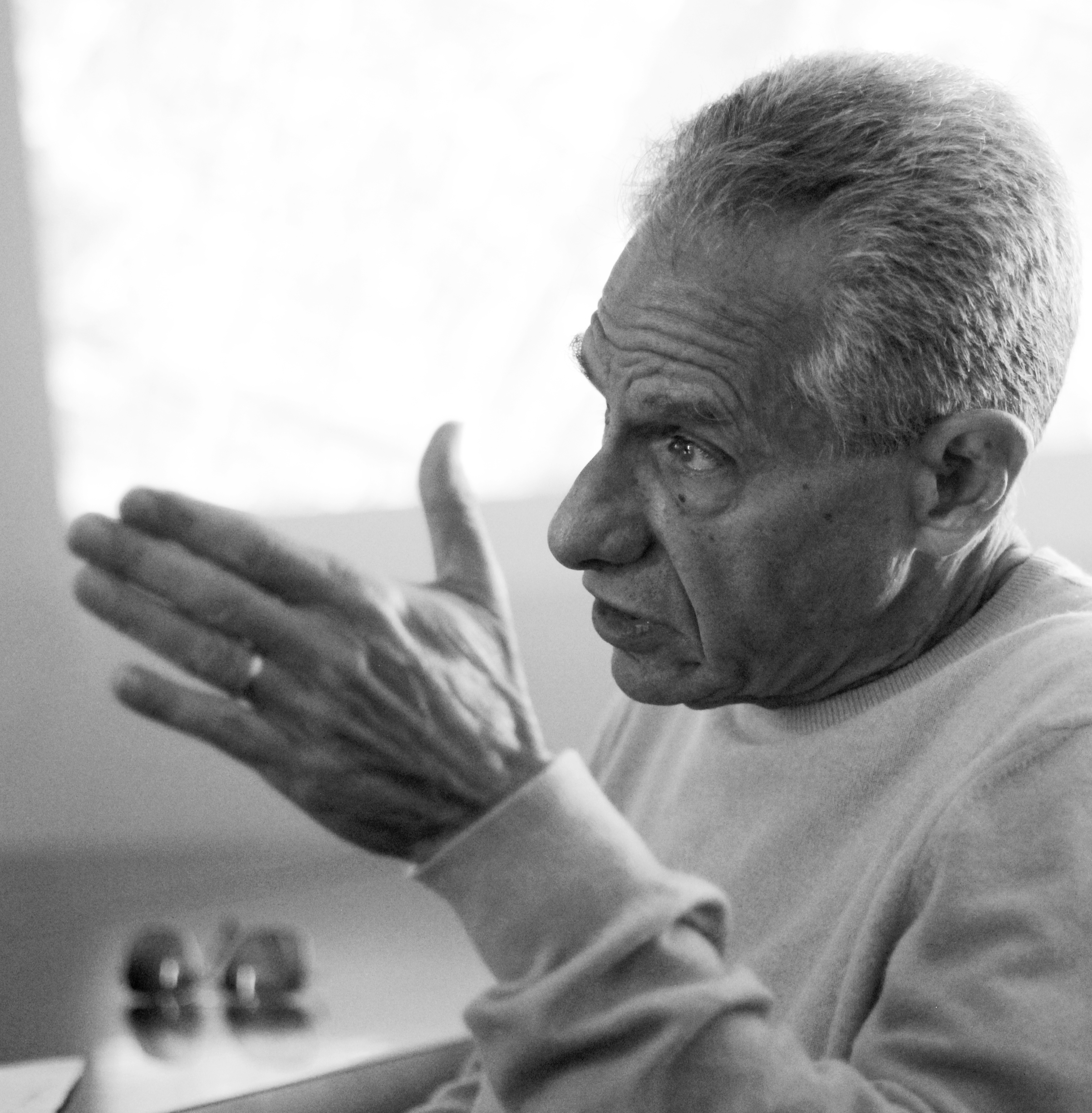
- Eric Owen Moss in Los Angeles, 2018
- Born: July 25, 1943 (age 83); Los Angeles, California, United States
- Education: UCLA, UC Berkeley, Harvard University
- Occupation: Architect
- Children: 2, including Miller
- Awards: Austrian Decoration for Science and Art; American Academy of Arts and Letters; Jencks Award; AIA/LA Gold Medal; Arnold Brunner Memorial Prize
- Practice: Eric Owen Moss Architects (EOMA)
- Website: ericowenmoss.com

Eric Owen Moss (born July 25, 1943) is an American architect based out of Culver City, California. He is the father of American football player Miller Moss.

== Education ==
Moss was born on July 25, 1943 in Los Angeles, California. He received a Bachelor of Arts from the University of California, Los Angeles in 1965, a Masters of Architecture from the University of California, Berkeley, College of Environmental Design in 1968 and a second Masters of Architecture from Harvard University Graduate School of Design in 1972.

== Academics ==
Moss has taught at Southern California Institute of Architecture (SCI-Arc) since 1974 and served as director from 2002 to 2015. He has held chairs at Yale and Harvard universities, and appointments at Columbia University, the University of Applied Arts Vienna, and the Royal Danish Academy of Fine Arts in Copenhagen.

== Career ==
Eric Moss founded Eric Owen Moss Architects (EOMA) in 1973, which had 25 staff as of 2016. The longest-running work of the office is an ongoing urban revitalization project in Culver City, California. Since 1986, the EOMA team has been commissioned by developers Frederick and Laurie Samitaur Smith to develop portions of an abandoned industrial neighborhood into an office campus. Today, the Hayden Tract and surrounding neighborhood attracts prominent design, film, internet, and digital media companies. In 2017 EOMA designed on Vespertine in the Hayden Tract, an experimental restaurant run by chef Jordan Kahn.

Paul Goldberger stated in a 2010 article for The New Yorker, "Slowly, one building at a time, Moss has managed to accomplish something that none of his fellow-jet-setters have ever achieved: the creation of a genuine urban transformation through architecture."

== Awards and honors ==
Moss received an Academy Award in Architecture from the American Academy of Arts and Letters in 1999. He was awarded the 2001 AIA/LA Gold Medal for his architectural work as well as the Business Week/Architectural Record Award in 2003 for the design and construction of the Stealth project, Culver City, California. He is a Fellow of the American Institute of Architects and received the Distinguished Alumni Award for the University of California at Berkeley in 2003. Moss received the 2007 Arnold Brunner Memorial Prize from the American Academy of Arts and Letters. In 2011, he was awarded the Jencks Award, given each year to an architect who has made a major contribution to theory and practice of architecture by the Royal Institute of British Architects. In 2014 Moss was named a "Game Changer" by Metropolis magazine. In 2016, Moss was awarded the Austrian Decoration for Science and Art.

Moss was awarded the American Prize for Architecture from the Chicago Athenaeum and the European Centre for Architecture Art Design and Urban Studies in 2020. Also known as the Louis H. Sullivan Award, the award is bestowed to an outstanding practitioner in the United States that has emblazoned a new direction in the history of American Architecture with talent, vision, and commitment and has demonstrated consistent contributions to humanity through the built environment and through the art of architecture.

In 2020 Conjunctive Points – The New City was awarded the AIA Twenty-five Year Award. The award is conferred on a building that has stood the test of time for 25–35 years and continues to set standards of excellence for its architectural design and significance.

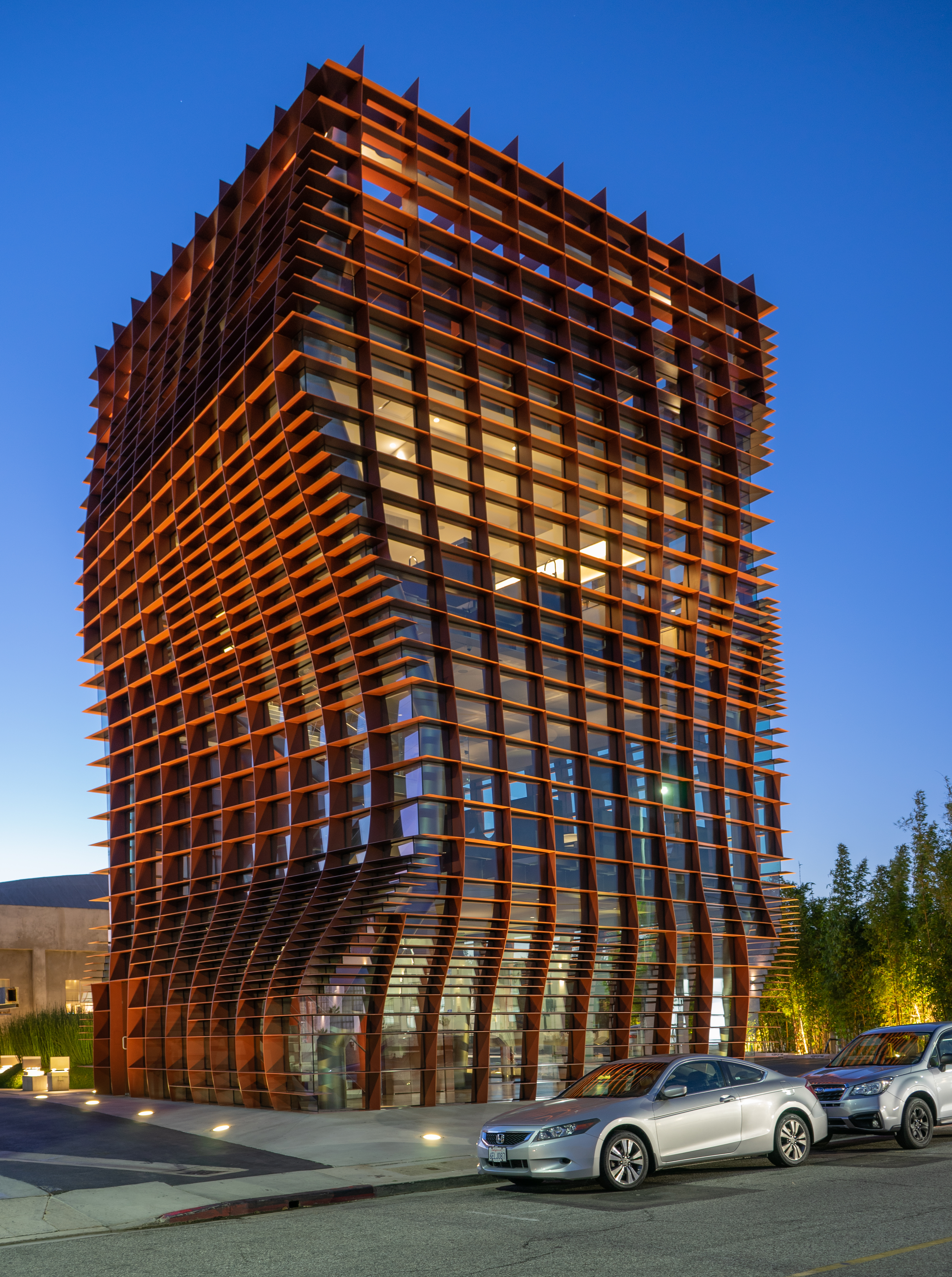
Vespertine, Culver City, CA

== List of works ==
- Triplex Apartments, Playa Del Rey, California, US, 1976
- Morgenstern Warehouse, Los Angeles, California, US, 1979
- 708 House, Los Angeles, California, US, 1982
- Petal House, Los Angeles, California, US, 1984
- 8522 National Boulevard, Culver City, California, US, 1986
- UC Irvine Central Housing Office, Irvine, California, USA 1989
- Lindblade Tower, Culver City, California, US, 1989
- Paramount Laundry, Culver City, California, US, 1989
- Gary Group, Culver City, California, US, 1990
- Lawson Westen House, Brentwood, California, US, 1993
- The Box, Culver City, California, US, 1994
- Gasometer D-1, Vienna, Austria, 1995 (unbuilt)
- Samitaur, Los Angeles, California, US, 1996
- SPARCity, Culver City, California, US, 1996
- 3535 Hayden Boulevard, Culver City, California, US, 1997
- Dancing Bleachers, Columbus, Ohio, US, 1998
- Umbrella, Culver City, California, US, 1999
- Stealth, Culver City, California, US, 2001
- Mariinsky Theater, St. Petersburg, Russia, 2001 (unbuilt)
- Beehive, Culver City, California, US, 2001
- Queens Museum of Art, Queens, New York, US, 2001 (unbuilt)
- Caterpillar, Los Angeles, California, US, 2001
- Smithsonian Institution, Patent Office Building, Washington DC, US, 2004 (unbuilt)
- Guangdong Provincial Museum, Guangzhou, China, 2004 (unbuilt)
- Republic Square, Almaty, Kazakhstan, 2006 (unbuilt)
- 3555 Hayden, Culver City, California, US, 2008
- If Not Now, When?, Vienna, Austria, 2009
- Samitaur Tower, Culver City, California, US, 2010
- Cactus Tower, Culver City, California, US, 2010
- Austrian Pavilion, Venice, Italy, 2010
- Nanjing Master Plan, Nanjing, China, 2013–current
- Termicas del Besos, Barcelona, Spain, 2013–current
- Pterodactyl, Culver City, California, US, 2014
- Sberbank Technopark, Moscow, Russia, 2016 (unbuilt)
- (W)rapper, Los Angeles, California, US, 2014–
- Vespertine, Culver City, California, US, 2017

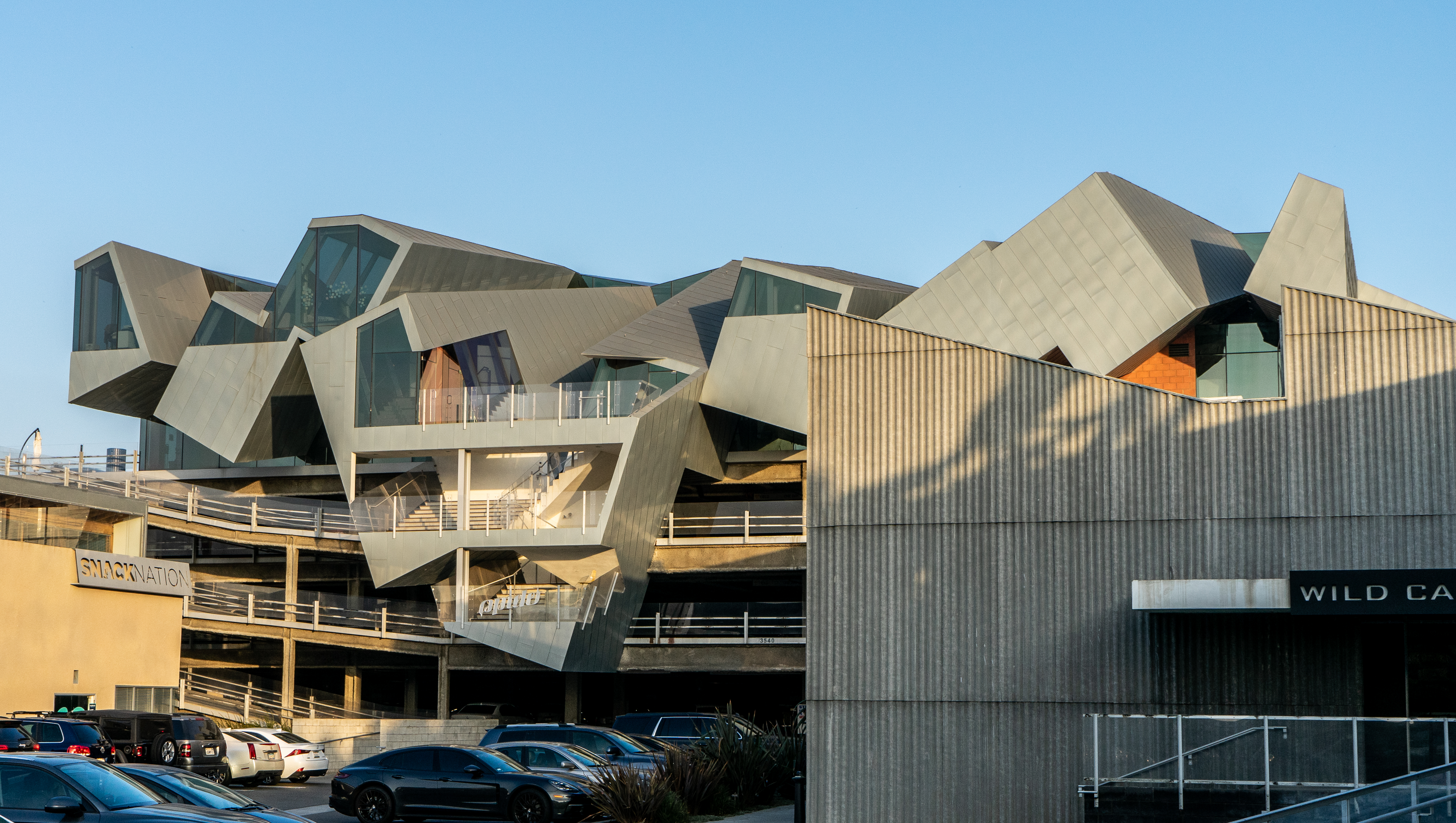
Pterodactyl, Culver City, CA

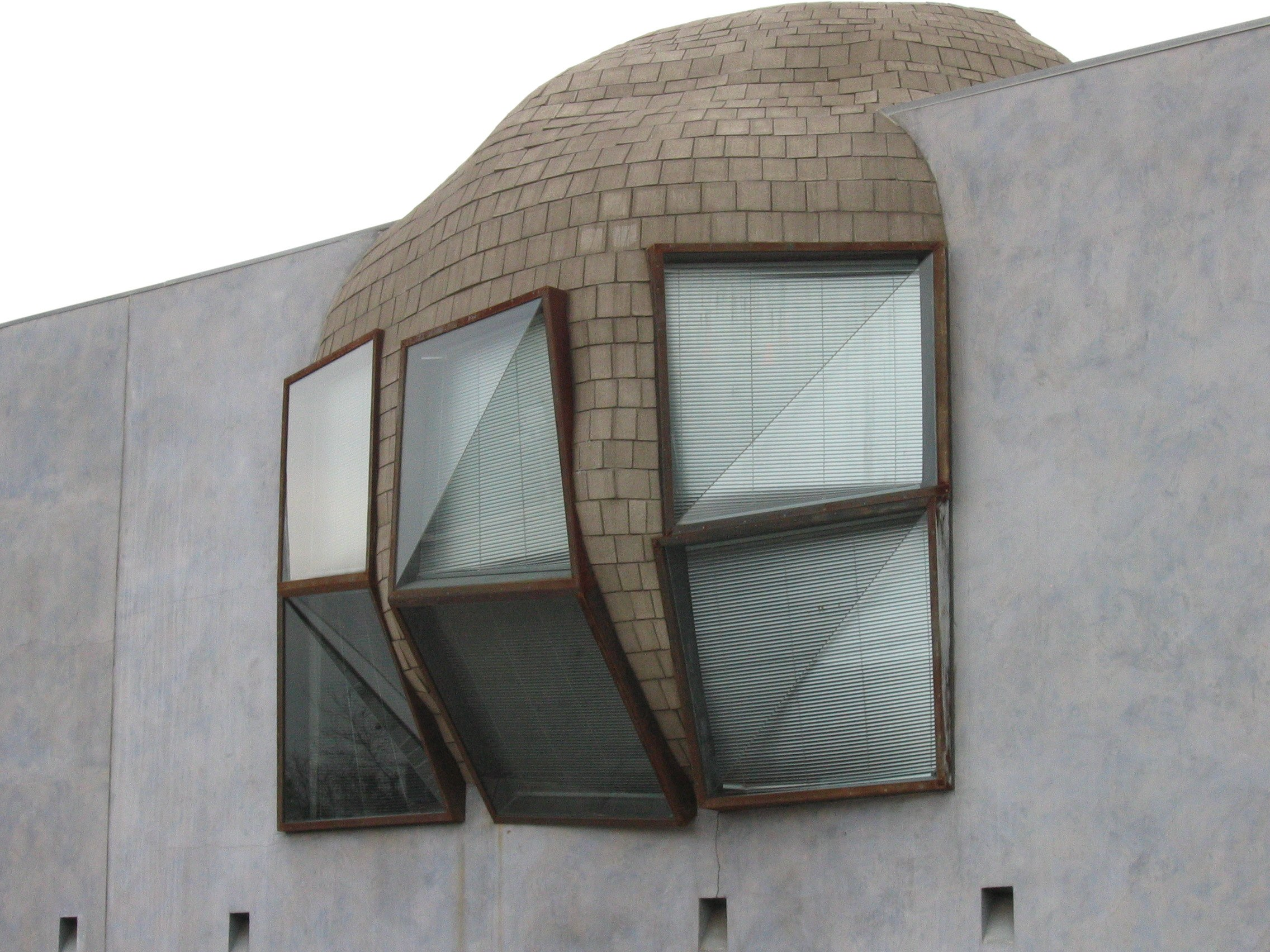
What Wall?, Eric Owen Moss, Culver City, CA

== Selected publications ==
There are twenty published monographs on the work of Moss' office.

- Eric Owen Moss, Vespertine, AADCU and Idea Books, Beijing and Amsterdam, 2023
- Eric Owen Moss, Nanjing Charter, essays by Michael Sorkin; Stefan Al; Joe Day; Hernan Diaz Alonso; Zhongjie Lin; Brian McGrath; Catherine Seavitt Nordenson; Xuefei Ren; Shawn Rickenbacker; David Grahame Shane; Brett Steele; Peter Trummer; Aleksandra Wagner, Urban Research, New York, 2020.
- The New City: I'll See It When I Believe It, preface by Frank Gehry, essays by Jean-Louis Cohen, Jeffrey Kipnis, Thom Mayne, Wolf D. Prix, Michael Sorkin, Rizzoli, New York, 2016.
- Todd Gannon (ed.), Eric Owen Moss Architects/3585: Source Books in Architecture 9, Applied Research + Design Publishing, San Francisco, 2016.
- Eric Owen Moss, Coughing Up the Moon, SCI-Arc Press + AADCU, Los Angeles and Beijing, 2015.
- Eric Owen Moss: I Maestri dell'Architettura, Hachette, France, 2012.
- Eric Owen Moss, Again, Who Says?, SCI-Arc Press, Los Angeles, 2012.
- Eric Owen Moss, Eric Owen Moss: Construction Manual 1988–2008, AADCU, Beijing, September 2009.
- Eric Owen Moss, Who Says What Architecture Is?, SCI-Arc Press, Los Angeles, November 2007.
- Emilia Giorgi, Paradigmi Provvisori, Marsilio, Venice, 2007.
- Paola Giaconia, Eric Owen Moss. The Uncertainty of Doing, Skira, Milan 2006.
- Eric Owen Moss: Buildings and Projects 3, Rizzoli, New York 2002.
- Eric Owen Moss, Gnostic Architecture, Monacelli, New York 1999.
- Luca Rivalta, Eric Owen Moss, Edil Stampa, Italy, March 2002.
- Preston Scott Cohen, Brooke Hodge (eds.), Eric Owen Moss. The Box, Princeton Architectural Press, New York 1996.
- Eric Owen Moss. Buildings and Projects 2, Rizzoli, New York 1995.
- James Steele, Lawson-Westen House (Architecture in Detail), Phaidon Press, London 1995.
- Eric Owen Moss. Architectural Monographs, n. 29, Academy Editions, London 1993.
- Eric Owen Moss. Buildings and Projects, Rizzoli, New York 1991.
- Olivier Boissiere, Eric Owen Moss Architecte: Lindblade Tower & Paramount Laundry, Les Editions du Demi-cercle, Paris, Spring 1990.

== See also ==
- List of American architects
