= HMS Meteor =

Nine ships of the Royal Navy have been named HMS Meteor after the meteor, a space object.

- HMS Meteor (1797) was a 12-gun gun-brig, launched at Leith in 1794 as the merchant vessel Lady Cathcart. The Royal Navy purchased her in 1797 and initially named her GB No. 34. She was sold in 1802. New owners returned her to the name Lady Cathcart and under that name she continued to trade until 1822.
- HMS Meteor (1803) was an 8-gun bomb vessel, previously in civilian service as Sarah Ann. She was purchased in 1803 and sold in 1811.
- HMS Meteor was an 18-gun sloop launched in 1805 as HMS Starr. She was rebuilt as a bomb vessel in 1812 and was renamed HMS Meteor. She was sold in 1816.
- HMS Meteor (1823) was an 8-gun bomb vessel launched in 1823. She became a survey ship in 1832 and was renamed HMS Beacon. She was sold in 1846.
- HMS Meteor (1824) was a wooden paddle vessel launched in 1824 and broken up in 1849.
- HMS Meteor (1839) was a river gunboat launched in 1839. Her fate is unknown.
- HMS Meteor (1855) was an Aetna-class ironclad floating battery launched in 1855 and broken up in 1861.
- HMS Meteor (1914) was an Thornycroft M-class destroyer launched in 1914 and sold in 1921.
- HMS Meteor (G73) was an M-class destroyer launched in 1941. She was handed over to the Turkish Navy in 1959 and renamed Piyale Pasha. She was on their navy lists until 1979.

== See also ==
- HMS Meteorite
- List of ships named Meteor
