= 708 House =

General information
- Status: Destroyed
- Location: 708 El Medio Avenue, Los Angeles, California, United States
- Year built: 1948
- Renovated: 1979-1982

Design and construction
- Architect: Milton H. Caughey

Renovating team
- Architect: Eric Owen Moss

708 House, located at 708 El Medio Avenue in the Pacific Palisades neighborhood of Los Angeles, was a single-family residence renovated by architect Eric Owen Moss. The building was destroyed in the Palisades Fire in January 2025.

708 House was designed by Milton H. Caughey in 1948 as a single-story residence. Beginning in 1979, Moss renovated the building to serve as his own family home, adding a second story atop the garage of the original building. It was the first instance where the second story was added without removing the first floor roof structure. One of its noteworthy features included 'flying buttresses' that frame the entrance. The 600-square foot addition was completed in 1982. The stucco exterior of the home featured a large painted 7, 0, and 8 on the northern, western, and southern faces, respectively, referring to the building's address. The three-bedroom, three-bathroom home was 1,912 square feet.

According to architectural historian Charles Jencks in his book Architecture Today, the 708 House was "a sophisticated essay in urban realism." Author Livio Sacchi said that the 708 House's extravagances would intrigue even the most distracted observer. Architectural historians David Gebhard and Robert Winter described the 708 House as "tinged with a sense of humor" and called it one of Moss's characteristic buildings.
