= List of ships named Meteor =

A number of ships have been named Meteor after a meteor or shooting star, including the following:

== Naval and Government vessels ==
- HMS Meteor, several ships of the Royal Navy
- SMS Meteor, several ships of the German Navy
- USAT Meteor, a troop transport of the US Army, built 1899 as Chester W. Chapin
- USS Meteor, several ships of the United States Navy
- Meteoro (1848), a brigantine that served in the Mexican and Chilean navies
- Meteor (1877), a salvage vessel, built as Hermes, that served in the Russian and Soviet navies 1916–1958
- Meteor (1887), a gunboat of the Austro-Hungarian Navy
- Meteoro-class, a class of Spanish offshore patrol vessels
  - Meteoro (2009), the first-of-class
- PS Meteor (1821), an early steam packet of the British Post Office
- Meteor (1915), a German survey ship
- Meteor (1964), a German research vessel
- Meteor (1986), a German research vessel
- a new German research vessel under construction, completion planned for 2026

== Merchant ships ==
- Meteor, a British schooner; destroyed in an accidental explosion in February 1834
- SS Meteor (1887), a British coastal passenger ship, later with the Romanian Government
- SS Meteor (1896), a whaleback freighter on the Great Lakes, now a museum ship in Superior, Wisconsin
- SS Meteor (1904), an ocean liner built for the Hamburg America Line, and later with Bergen Line; sunk by aircraft 9 March 1945
- One of several Type C2 ships built for the United States Maritime Commission:
  - SS Meteor (1941) (MC hull number 127, Type C2-T), built by Tampa Shipbuilding; transferred to the United States Navy as Arcturus-class attack cargo ship USS Electra (AKA-4); scrapped in 1974
  - SS Meteor (1943) (MC hull number 292, Type C2-S-B1), built by Moore Dry Dock; sold for commercial use under the name American Miller in 1948; scrapped in 1970
- MV Meteor (1955), a cruise ship of Bergen Line, then later with Epirotiki Line as Neptune; scrapped in 2002
- Meteor (hydrofoil), a Soviet seagoing passenger hydrofoil design; over 400 built from 1959 to 2006

== Yachts ==
- Meteor (1887 yacht) (1887), Kaiser Wilhelm II's yacht, formerly Thistle
- Meteor (1902 yacht) (1902), Kaiser Wilhelm II's yacht

== See also ==
- HMS Meteorite, an experimental submarine
