= Vespertine (restaurant) =

Restaurant in Culver City, California, U.S.

- Interactive map of Vespertine

Restaurant information
- Head chef: Jordan Kahn
- Rating: (Michelin Guide)
- Location: 3599 Hayden Avenue, Culver City, California, 90232, United States
- Coordinates: 34°1′27″N 118°22′54.5″W
- Website: vespertine.la

Vespertine is a gastronomical restaurant in Culver City, California, United States.

== History ==
Vespertine opened in 2017 in a building designed by architect Eric Owen Moss.

The restaurant closed in March 2020 but reopened in April 2024. The reopened Vespertine features a new menu inspired by a trip head chef Jordan Kahn and his wife took to Nayarit, Mexico.

Vespertine's soundtrack was created by Sigur Rós's frontman Jónsi, in collaboration with Kahn, music producer CJ Baran, and composer Paul Corley.

== Reception ==
In its first year Vespertine was named best restaurant in Los Angeles by Jonathan Gold, and Time Magazine listed Vespertine as one of the World's Greatest Places to Visit in 2018.

In 2024, Vespertine regained its Michelin-star rating.

== See also ==
- List of Michelin-starred restaurants in California
- Meteora
