= Meteora (disambiguation) =

Meteora is a rock formation and important complex of Eastern Orthodox monasteries in Thessaly, Greece.

Meteora may also refer to:

- Meteora (municipality), a municipality in Thessaly, Greece
- Meteora (album), a 2003 album by Linkin Park
- Meteora (film), a 2012 film by Spiros Stathoulopoulos
- Meteora (horse), a racehorse
- Meteora (restaurant), a Michelin-starred restaurant in Hollywood, California
- Meteora sporadica, a free-living protozoan
- Meteora (wrestling), a professional wrestling attack
- Meteora: The Unchained Goddess, a 1958 film in the Bell Laboratory Science Series
- Meteora Österreich, a character from 2017 anime series Re:Creators
- Meteorology (Aristotle), a philosophical treatise by Aristotle
