= Meteora (restaurant) =

Restaurant in Los Angeles, California, U.S.

- Interactive map of Meteora

Restaurant information
- Chef: Jordan Kahn
- Rating: (Michelin Guide)
- Location: 6703 Melrose Avenue, Los Angeles, California, 90038, United States
- Coordinates: 34.0835°N 118.3399°W
- Website: meteora.la

Meteora is a restaurant in Hancock Park, Los Angeles, California, United States. Jordan Kahn is the chef.

== Description ==
Meteora's overall design is prehistoric-themed. The restaurant's drink menu consists of tepache, and food includes an avocado pie, bluefin squid, and an appetizer named Leaves & Stones.

== See also ==
- List of Michelin-starred restaurants in California
- Vespertine
