= USS Meteor =

USS Meteor may refer to:

- USS Meteor (1819), was a full‑rigged sailing ship, built in 1819, and sunk in 1862 as part of the Stone Fleet
- USS Meteor (1863) was a "Tinclad" gunboat, built as Scioto in 1863, commissioned in 1864, and sold in 1865.
- USNS Meteor (T-AKR-9), was originally named Sea Lift (T-LSV-9), a roll-on/roll-off cargo ship, launched in 1965, renamed in 1975, and transferred to the Reserve Fleet in 2006.

== See also ==
- List of ships named Meteor
