= Trecothick (1784 ship) =

History

Great Britain
- Name: Unknown
- Launched: 1773, Thames
- Acquired: 1784
- Renamed: Trecothick (1784)
- Fate: Wrecked 1786

General characteristics
- Tons burthen: 250 (bm)

Trecothick was launched on the Thames in 1773, possibly under another name. She first appeared as Trecothick in 1784 and was lost in 1786.

Trecothick entered Lloyd's Register (LR) in 1784.

Year	Master	Owner	Trade	Source
1784	Robert Elder	Trecothic	London–Boston	LR
1786	Robert Elder	Trecothic	London–Grenada	LR

On 4 January 1786, Trecothick was lost near Looe, Cornwall with the loss of all but four of her crew. She was on a voyage from London to Grenada. Another report stated that Captain Elder and 12 of his crew had drowned when a violent gale had driven Trecothick onto a ridge of rocks. Lloyd's Register for 1786 carried the annotation "Lost" by her name.
