= SMS Meteor =

SMS Meteor may refer to one of the following ships:

- SMS Meteor (1865), a gunboat of the Imperial German Navy
- SMS Meteor (1887), an Austrian-Hungarian torpedo boat
- SMS Meteor (1890), an aviso
- SMS Meteor (1914), a converted merchant ship which saw service during the First World War
- SMS Meteor (1915), a planned gunboat, completed instead as a survey ship

== See also ==
- List of ships named Meteor
