= Meteorite (disambiguation) =

A meteorite is an object that originates in outer space and impacts the surface of a planet or moon.

Meteorite may also refer to:

- Meteorite Hills, a group of hills, forming the western portion of the Darwin Mountains in Antarctica
- Meteorite Island, an island in Baffin Bay, in Avannaata municipality, off northwest Greenland
- HMS Meteorite, an experimental U-boat developed in Germany, scuttled at the end of World War II, subsequently raised and commissioned into the Royal Navy
- Meteorites (wasp), a genus of wasps in the tribe Euphorini

== Music ==
- Meteorites (album), by Echo & the Bunnymen
- "Meteorite" (Mariah Carey song), 2014
- "Meteorite" (Years & Years song), 2016
- "Meteorites" (Lights song), 2014

== Other ==
- Rolls-Royce Meteorite, also known as the Rover Meteorite, a V8 petrol or diesel engine derived from the Rolls-Royce Meteor
- A monk from the monasteries of Meteora may be called a Meteorite
- Karla Sofen, a Marvel suppervillain previously known as Meteorite
- Valerie Barnhardt, a Marvel character known as Meteorite
- Lifter (comics), a Marvel mutant character also known as Meteorite
