= HMS St Vincent (1815) =

Ship of the line of the Royal Navy

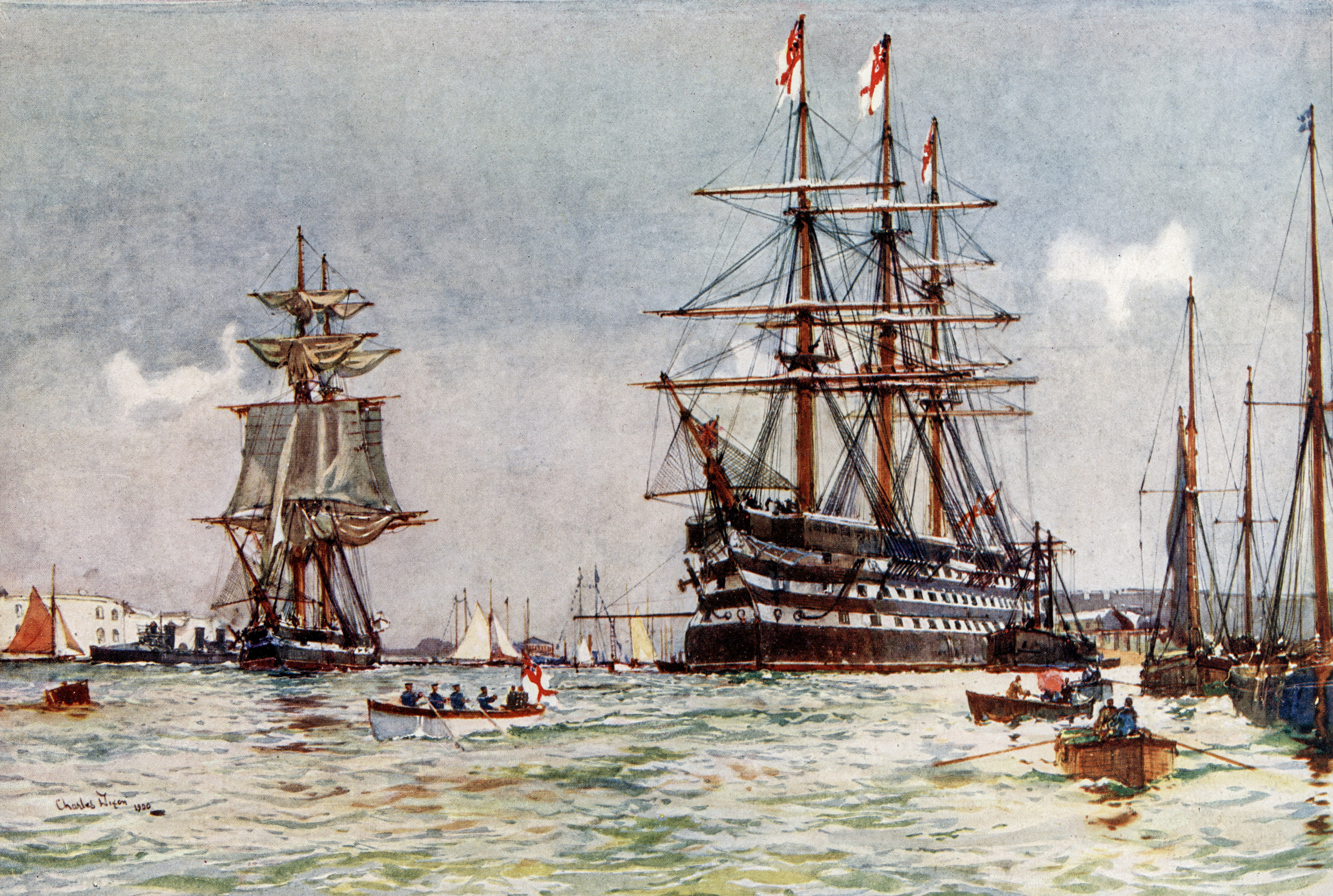
- St Vincent in Portsmouth Harbour by Charles Dixon

History

United Kingdom
- Name: St Vincent
- Ordered: 15 January 1806
- Builder: HM Dockyard, Devonport
- Laid down: May 1810
- Launched: 11 March 1815
- Commissioned: 7 September 1829
- Fate: Sold for scrap, 15 May 190

General characteristics
- Class & type: 120-gun Nelson-class ship of the line
- Tons burthen: 2,612 31/94 (bm)
- Length: 204 ft 11 in (62.5 m) (gun deck)
- Beam: 53 ft 8 in (16.4 m)
- Draught: 18 ft 9 in (5.7 m)
- Depth of hold: 24 ft (7.3 m)
- Propulsion: Sails
- Sail plan: Full-rigged ship
- Complement: 875
- Armament: 120 muzzle-loading, smoothbore guns: Lower gun deck: 32 × 32 pdrs; Middle gundeck: 34 × 24 pdrs; Upper gundeck: 34 × 18 pdrs; Quarterdeck: 6 × 12 pdrs, 10 × 32 pdr carronades; Forecastle: 2 × 32 pdr carronades

HMS St Vincent was a 120-gun first-rate ship of the line of the Royal Navy, laid down in 1810 at HM Dockyard, Devonport, and launched on 11 March 1815. She saw service at sea in the mid 19th century before becoming a training ship in Portsmouth Harbour until she was decommissioned in 1906.

== Design and description ==
The Nelson class was designed as a joint effort between the two co-Surveyors of the Navy, Robert Seppings and Joseph Tucker as improved versions of the preceding Caledonia class, St Vincent measured 204 feet 11 inches (62.5 m) on the gun deck and 170 feet 6 inches (52.0 m) on the keel. The ship had a beam of 53 feet 8 inches (16.4 m), a depth of hold of 24 feet (7.3 m) and had a tonnage of 2,612 31/94 tons burthen. Her light draft was 18 feet 9 inches (5.7 m). Her crew numbered 875 officers and ratings and the ships had the usual three-masted full-ship rig.

The Nelson-class ships were armed with 120 muzzle-loading, smoothbore guns that consisted of thirty-two 32-pounder guns on the lower gun deck, thirty-four 24-pounder gun on the middle gun deck and thirty-four 18-pounder guns on the upper gun deck. Their forecastles mounted a pair of 12-pounder guns and two 32-pounder carronades. On their quarterdeck they carried six 12-pounder guns and ten 32-pounder carronades. Above the quarterdeck was the poop deck with half-a-dozen 18-pounder carronades.

== Construction and career ==
Named in honour of Admiral John Jervis, 1st Earl St Vincent, St Vincent was the third ship of her name to serve in the RN, and was ordered on 15 January 1806. The ship was laid down at HM Dockyard, Devonport in May 1810 and launched on 11 March 1815. Upon her completion, but before she was commissioned, she was placed in ordinary. St Vincent was not commissioned until 7 September 1829 when Captain Edward Hawker did so as the flag captain for Admiral Lord Northesk, the Commander-in-Chief, Plymouth. Paid off on 31 April 1830, she was recommissioned the following day by Captain Hyde Parker as the flagship of Admiral Sir Thomas Foley, the Commander-in-Chief, Portsmouth. St Vincent was recommissioned on 25 February 1831 by Captain Humphrey Senhouse as the flagship of Admiral Henry Hotham, commander of the Mediterranean Fleet.

On 18 February 1834, St Vincent was at Malta when the British merchant schooner Meteor was destroyed there by the explosion of her cargo of gunpowder with the loss of 28 lives. The explosion severely damaged St Vincent and drove her aground. She was refloated on 21 February after unshipping all of her guns and subsequently was repaired and returned to service. The ship was subsequently paid off, and was refitted at Portsmouth from May to July. St Vincent received a "Small Repair" and was outfitted as a demonstration flagship at Portsmouth between July 1839 and August 1843.

The ship had a "Very Small Repair" and was refitted as an "Advanced ship" from April 1849 to December 1851 so she could be activated more quickly, which meant that all of her guns were aboard and more of her masts were fitted; the rest of her rigging and stores were in a designated warehouse.

Placed on harbour service at Portsmouth in 1841, St Vincent joined the Experimental Squadron in 1846. From May 1847 until April 1849 she was the flagship of Rear-Admiral Sir Charles Napier, commanding the Channel Fleet.

After a spell in ordinary at Portsmouth, from July to September 1854, during the Crimean War, she was used to transport French troops to the Baltic. Subsequently, she became a depot ship at Portsmouth. She was driven ashore there on 11 January 1862, but was refloated. She was commissioned as a training ship in 1862, and specifically as a training ship for boys, moored permanently at Haslar from 1870. In this role she retained 26 guns. She continued as a training ship until 1905. Commander Cecil Thursby was in command from April 1899, succeeded by Commander Bentinck J. D. Yelverton from January 1902. The final commander was G. C. Cayley, who captained the ship from 1904 until her decommissioning in 1906. St Vincent was sold out of the service in 1906 for breaking up. She was broken up in Falmouth Docks and one of her anchors was put on display near Gyllyngvase Beach in Falmouth.
