= Lady Cathcart (ship) =

At least three vessels have been named Lady Cathcart:

- Lady Cathcart, of 400 tons (bm), was launched at Yarmouth in 1783. She sailed as a West Indiaman for Mangles & Co. and was lost on 2 April 1786 off the southwest part of Hispaniola; her crew was saved
- Lady Cathcart (1794 ship) was launched at Leith in 1794. Between 1797 and 1802 she served the British Royal Navy as the gun-brig HMS Meteor. She then returned to mercantile service and continued sailing to 1822.
- Lady Cathcart, of 188 tons (bm), was launched at Greenock in 1828. In 1830 Captain John Mackie sailed her from Greenock to Jamaica. She was destroyed by fire at Kingston on 24 May 1831. On 15 July 1831 Lloyd's List reported that Lady Cathcart had caught fire at Kingston, Jamaica. She had sunk and would be sold.
- Lady Cathcart, an iron screw steamer of 648grt, was built by Alexander Hall & Co., Aberdeen, and launched on 13 September 1882. She was wrecked at Johnshaven, Kincardine, on 21 April 1889 while sailing from Kennet Pans to Aberdeen with coal.
