= Compagnie de Calonne =

Early modern colonial company

The Compagnie de Calonne was the last iteration of the Compagnie des Indes, a series of French state-sponsored ventures to compete with the British East India Company and Dutch East India Company. It was established in 1785 at the initiative of Charles Alexandre de Calonne, and eventually liquidated in 1794 in the turmoil of the French Revolution.

== Overview ==
Following the liquidation of the French Indies Company in 1770, a new company was reconstituted in 1785, and issued 40,000 shares of stock, priced at 1,000 livres apiece. It was given monopoly on all trade with countries beyond the Cape of Good Hope for an agreed period of seven years.

Unlike the previous iterations of the French Indies Company, the new venture did not hold civil or military power in its overseas outposts, nor did it fully control the port infrastructure at Lorient which by then belonged to the French Navy. Even so, it had a promising start, but that was cut short by the French Revolution. On 3 April 1790 the monopoly was abolished by an act of the new Constituent Assembly which enthusiastically declared that the lucrative Far Eastern trade would henceforth be "thrown open to all Frenchmen".

The Committee of Public Safety had banned all joint-stock companies on 24 August 1793, and specifically seized the assets and papers of the East India Company. While its liquidation proceedings were being set up, directors of the company bribed various senior state officials to allow the company to carry out its own liquidation, rather than be supervised by the government. When this became known the following year, the resulting scandal led to the execution of key Montagnard deputies like Fabre d'Églantine and Joseph Delaunay, among others. The infighting sparked by the episode also brought down Georges Danton and can be said to have led to the downfall of the Montagnards as a whole.

== See also ==
- France-Asia relations
- French colonial empire
- French India
- List of chartered companies
