= Meteor (schooner) =

Meteor was a British merchant schooner which was destroyed in an explosion at the Grand Harbour, Malta in February 1834, with the loss of at least 11 lives.

== Explosion ==
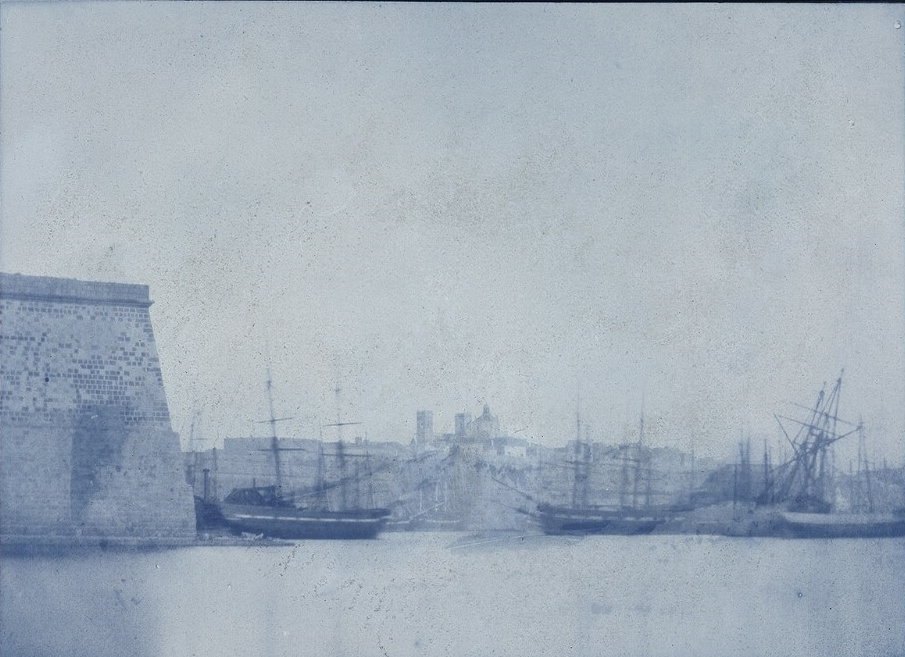
Merchant vessels in the Grand Harbour, as photographed by Calvert Jones in 1846

During its final voyage, the Meteor was captained by master James William Waye and it carried gunpowder and general cargo from London to Malta. The vessel encountered stormy weather and while en route, approximately 300–400 lb (140–180 kg) of gunpowder fell out of the barrels it was stored in. The vessel arrived in Malta's Grand Harbour on 13 February 1834, and 180 barrels of gunpowder were unloaded without incident shortly afterwards and were taken to a government gunpowder magazine. The vessel was surveyed while stationed at a buoy, and the spilled gunpowder was noted to have made its way in between the remaining cargo.

On 14 February, the schooner was cleared to approach a wharf in order to unload its remaining cargo. At this point, a surveyor boarded the vessel and noticed that a fire had been lit in the ship's cookhouse while the spilled gunpowder had not yet been disposed of. This was reported to the ship's master and mate and to the Marine Police, but despite police orders to put out the fires, Waye claimed that all gunpowder had been unloaded and permitted that fires be lit on board.

While the general cargo was being unloaded on 15 February, the schooner was destroyed by an accidental explosion which killed 11 people, including master Waye, two other crew members, the superintendent responsible for discharging the cargo, a Marine Police officer, a Maltese warehousemen and four Maltese labourers. Four crew members and four Maltese workers also suffered injuries and were treated at the Civil Hospital in Valletta; the full extents of their injuries is not clear but they were reported to be recovering within a few days of the explosion. The cargo which remained on board the schooner was lost during the explosion.

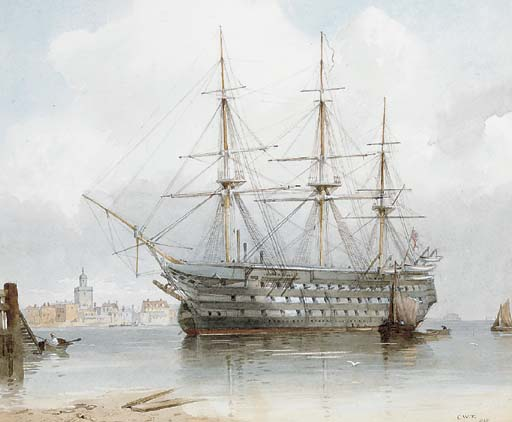
The HMS St Vincent which was reportedly damaged during the Meteor explosion, as painted by Charles W. Fothergill in 1898

According to the 10 March 1834 edition of The Times, the explosion occurred on 18 February and 28 lives were lost. The Royal Navy ship of the line HMS St Vincent was reportedly severely damaged and was driven aground by the explosion, but was refloated on 21 February.

== Inquest and aftermath ==
On the day of the accident, the Lieutenant Governor instructed Chief Secretary to Government Frederick Hankey to order acting coroner William Robertson to hold an inquest to determine the cause of the accident. The subsequent investigation revealed that the explosion was a result of Waye's negligence. The inquest report was later published in the Malta Government Gazette. Stricter controls for vessels carrying gunpowder were subsequently published in the Government Gazette dated 19 March 1834.

A fund was set up for the relatives of the victims in the aftermath of the accident, and British forces and the Filodrammatici Maltesi held theatrical performances to raise money for the victims' families.

== See also ==
- 1634 Valletta explosion
- 1806 Birgu polverista explosion
- C23 tragedy
