= HMS Meteor (1797) =

Brig of the Royal Navy

History

Great Britain
- Name: Lady Cathcart
- Owner: R.Bruce
- Builder: Leith
- Launched: 1794
- Fate: Sold 1797

Great Britain
- Name: GB No. 34
- Builder: Leith
- Acquired: March 1797 by purchase
- Renamed: HMS Meteor
- Fate: Sold 1802

United Kingdom
- Name: Lady Cathcart
- Owner: Various
- Builder: Leith
- Acquired: 1802 by purchase
- Fate: Last listed 1822

General characteristics
- Tons burthen: 15377/94, or 161, or 165 (bm)
- Length: Overall: 74 ft 6 in (22.7 m); Keel: 61 ft 7 1/4 in (18.8 m)
- Beam: 21 ft 8 in (6.6 m)
- Depth of hold: 9 ft 0 in (2.7 m)
- Propulsion: Sail
- Complement: 50
- Armament: 1797:2 × 18-pounder guns + 10 × 18-pounder carronades; 1810:10 × 18-pounder carronades

HMS Meteor was originally the merchant ship Lady Cathcart launched at Leith in 1794. The Royal Navy purchased her in 1797, used her as a gun-brig escorting convoys in the North Sea, and sold her in 1802. She then returned to mercantile service under her original name and continued to trade along the British coast. She was last listed in 1822.

== Lady Cathcart ==
Lady Cathcart entered Lloyd's Register in 1792 with R.Bruce, owner and master, and trade Leith–London. In 1797 Lloyd's Register still carried Lady Cathcart with unchanged information.

== HMS Meteor ==
After the onset of war with France Britain's merchant fleet provided French, and later Dutch privateers with a target-rich environment. The Royal Navy needed escort vessels and a quick fix was to buy existing merchant vessels, arm and man them, and then deploy them. Between March and April the Admiralty purchased 10 brigs at Leith, Lady Cathcart among them. The Royal Navy initially designated these as GB №__, but then gave them names before they actually sailed.

The Royal Navy acquired Lady Cathcart in March 1797 at Leith and commissioned her as GB No.34 that month under the command of Lieutenant Alexander Pearson for the North Sea. She underwent fitting at Leith between 20 March and 11 July. She spent her brief naval career escorting convoys.

After the Treaty of Amiens ended the war with France, the Admiralty had Meteor come into Sheerness and paid her off.

The "Principal Officers and Commissioners of His Majesty's Navy" offered Meteor, of 154 tons, lying at Sheerness, for sale on 24 February 1802. She was sold that month.

== Lady Cathcart ==
The Register of Shipping carried Lady Cathcart, of 165 tons (bm), launched at Leith in 1794, from 1802 to 1818. On 20 August 1816 Lloyd's List reported that Lady Cathcart, of Shields, had been sailing from Dundalk to Norway when she was driven on shore and bilged near Lough Swilly. However she returned to service and continued to trade for another six years.

Year	Master	Owner	Trade
1802	R.Bruce	R.Bruce	Government service
1804	Williamson	E. Silva	London–Coast
1805	Judd	E. Silva	London–Coast
1810	W.Osborne (or W.Osburn)	E. Silva	Cork transport
1815	W.Osborne; Noch_ter	E.Silva	Cork transport London–Southampton
1820	Nochester	Captain & co.	London–Southampton
1822	Nochester	Captain & co.	London–Southampton
