= Figureheads Collection Project: National Museum of the Royal Navy =

In 2023, the National Museum of the Royal Navy, Portsmouth embarked upon a two year restoration and reinterpretation project of their nationally important figurehead collection. The project was completed in 2025.

== History ==
The National Museum of the Royal Navy holds a significant collection of figureheads from the Age of Sail, dated between the 1700s and early 1900s. With over 70 figureheads in total, this national collection can be found scattered across the United Kingdom and even as far as Europe.

Figureheads were carved as bow decorations for the front of wooden naval vessels (common also among mercantile ships) and have a history that can be traced back as far as Ancient Egypt. Believed to hold the soul or spirit of a ship, they were well respected and cared for by sailors who believed a ship without a figurehead was bad luck.

Numerous individuals and carving families operated throughout the UK, namely the Dickerson family of Devonport, Plymouth and Hellyer & Sons of Portsmouth and Robert Hall of Rotherhithe, London. Other figureheads were carved in Bombay (modern day Mumbai) under the British-controlled dockyard. Construction and decoration was carried out dominantly by the Wadia family of Parsi shipbuilders, though their names went unrecorded.

Figureheads could take the form of animals, Greek mythological characters, naval heroes, members of the royal family, political figures and other notable members of high society. A figurehead in female form was particularly common, especially with one or both breasts bared. A design trait that was believed to hold the power to calm treacherous seas.

== Locations ==
Much of the collection has been held on site in Portsmouth, with many on display in the Figureheads Gallery. Others, however, remain inaccessible to the public, either in storage or "behind the wire" within HMNB Portsmouth Dockyard, exposed to the elements and lacking preservation.

Fourteen of the National Museum of the Royal Navy's collection were loaned to The Box, Plymouth when they transformed from Plymouth City Museum and Art Gallery and reopened in 2020. These received full conservation and can be seen on display in the South Hall.

Others are still held at various European dockyards that once supported the Royal Navy, either through allied relationships or as former states of the British Empire.

=== Other collections ===
Other notable collections of figureheads can be found at the National Maritime Museum in Greenwich, London, who hold sixty figureheads respectively, making up another national collection.

Several others can be seen housed within Devonport Naval Heritage Centre in Plymouth.

== The Project ==
The project was greenlit by the National Lottery Heritage Fund and Pilgrim Trust in 2023 who funded grants of £249,000 and £15,000 respectively. Three figureheads received full conservation: HMS Seaflower (1873), HM Brig Martin and HMS Queen Charlotte (1810) A further two - HMS Asia (1824) and HMS Madagascar (1822) - were identified for re-interpretation. Vast numbers of the collection were also researched in-depth for the first time, with new knowledge being shared with visitors and other interested parties through the Bloomberg Connects website and app; ArtUK and Wikipedia.

The National Museum of the Royal Navy created a team of curators, conservators and community producers to work on the project over the course of two years, and employed Orbis Conservation and Lincoln Conservation to carry out the restorative and analytical work to the five figureheads. The museum also worked with numerous community groups to better understand the nuances of accuracy with portrayal and culturally appropriate representation, and to direct the research.

== Conservation ==
=== Orbis Conservation ===
London based conservation company, Orbis, won the contract to restore HM Brig Martin, HMS Seaflower and HMS Queen Charlotte, having previously restored the figureheads loaned to The Box, Plymouth. The figureheads underwent CT scans to fully understand the level of degradation within each figure, before they were restored internally and externally.

Analysis of the painting schemes the figureheads had already undergone over several hundred years revealed numerous combinations, colours and paint types, with many beginning life as white figures with gold gilding. This was commonplace for figureheads to prevent their costs from becoming too high.

The newly conserved figureheads were then repainted using a collection of Players Cigarette Cards from 1912 as the inspiring paint schemes.

=== Lincoln Conservation ===
Lincoln Conservation's services were required to perform paint analysis on both HMS Asia and HMS Madagascar figureheads. This was particularly important as the two most controversial figureheads within the collection.

A CT scan was also conducted of HMS Madagascar that revealed the extent of damage done to the figurehead from fire and damp rot. It also revealed a number of bullets lodged within the figurehead, the details of which were then sent to the Royal Armouries Museum in Leeds for further investigation.

== Outcome ==
The figureheads project culminated in a redisplaying of conserved figureheads and a celebratory event to mark the end of the project.

Research completed on the history of the ships and figureheads were shared onto the Bloomberg Connects digital guide app and website and ArtUK website. Research was also compiled into figurehead sections for the relevant ships' articles on Wikipedia, whilst other individual figurehead articles were created for those with a wider history.

Figureheads involved in the Figureheads Collection Project 2023-2025
Figurehead	Conserved	Display/Storage	Location
HM Brig Martin	Yes	Displayed	National Museum of the Royal Navy
HMS Seaflower (1873)	Yes	Displayed	National Museum of the Royal Navy
HMS Queen Charlotte (1810)	Yes	Displayed	National Museum of the Royal Navy
HMS Madagascar (1822)	No - research/reinterpretation	Removed from display due to offensive nature. Storage.	National Museum of the Royal Navy - Storehouse 12
HMS Asia (1824)	No - research/reinterpretation	Displayed	National Museum of the Royal Navy
HMS Victory (1765)	No - researched only	Displayed	National Museum of the Royal Navy
HMS Tremendous/Grampus (1774)	No - researched only	Displayed	National Museum of the Royal Navy
HMS Warrior (1781)	No - researched only	Displayed	National Museum of the Royal Navy
HMS Bellerophon (1786)	No - researched only	Displayed	National Museum of the Royal Navy
HMS Illustrious (1803)	No - researched only	Displayed	
HMS Apollo (1805)	No - researched only	Displayed	National Museum of the Royal Navy
HMS Calliope (1808)	No - researched only	Displayed	National Museum of the Royal Navy
HMS Poictiers (1809)	No - researched only	Displayed	National Museum of the Royal Navy
HMS Benbow (1813)	No - researched only		
HMS Glasgow (1814)	No - researched only	Displayed	National Museum of the Royal Navy
HMS Waterloo (1818)	No - researched only		
HMS Minerva (1820)	No - researched only	DIsplayed	National Museum of the Royal Navy
HMS Carnatic (1823)	No - researched only	Displayed	National Museum of the Royal Navy
HMS Bellerophon (1824)	No - researched only	Displayed	National Museum of the Royal Navy
HMS Orestes (1824)	No - researched only	Displayed	National Museum of the Royal Navy
HMS Rolla (1829)	No - researched only	Displayed	National Museum of the Royal Navy
HMS Black Eagle (1831)	No - researched only	Displayed	National Museum of the Royal Navy
HMS Actaeon (1831)	No - researched only	Displayed	National Museum of the Royal Navy
HMS Royal Adelaide (1834)	No - researched only	Displayed	National Museum of the Royal Navy
HMS Blazer (1834)	No - researched only	Displayed	National Museum of the Royal Navy
HMS Cleopatra (1835)	No - researched only		
HMS Trafalgar (1841)	No - researched only	Displayed	National Museum of the Royal Navy - Outside
HMS Eurydice (1843)	No - researched only	Displayed	National Museum of the Royal Navy
HMS Centurion (1844)	No - researched only	Displayed	National Museum of the Royal Navy
HMS Princess Alice (1844)	No - researched only	Displayed	National Museum of the Royal Navy
HMS Trincomalee (1845)	No - researched only	Displayed	National Museum of the Royal Navy - Hartlepool
HMY Fairy (1845)	No - researched only		
HMS Malacca (1847)	No - researched only	Displayed	National Museum of the Royal Navy
HMS Elfin (1849)	No - researched only	Displayed	National Museum of the Royal Navy
Unknown Lady (1850)	No - researched only	Displayed	National Museum of the Royal Navy
HMS Cruizer (1852)	No - researched only		
HMS Supply (1854)	No - researched only	Storage	National Museum of the Royal Navy
HMY Victoria and Albert II (1855)	No - researched only	Displayed	National Museum of the Royal Navy
HMS Peterel (1860)	No - researched only		
HMS Warrior (1860)	No - researched only	Displayed - attached to ship	National Museum of the Royal Navy
HMY Alberta (1863)	No - researched only	Displayed	National Museum of the Royal Navy
HMS Tamar (1863)	No - conserved for The Box 2020	Displayed	The Box, Plymouth
HMS Albatross (1873)	No - researched only	Displayed	National Museum of the Royal Navy
HMS Centurion (1892)	No - researched only		
HMS Espiegle (1900)	No - researched only	Displayed	National Museum of the Royal Navy
