= HMS Nettle =

Four ships of the Royal Navy have borne the name HMS Nettle, after the stinging nettle, a species of flowering plants. A fifth was renamed before being launched.

- HMS Nettle (1856) was a Cheerful-class wooden screw gunboat launched in 1856 and broken up in 1867.
- HMS Nettle was a target ship, formerly the 84-gun second-rate HMS Thunderer. She had been renamed Comet in 1869, Nettle in 1870, and was sold in 1901.
- HMS Nettle (1905) was a tender, formerly the War Department's Pennar. She was transferred to the navy in 1905 and was sold in 1934.
- HMS Nettle was to have been a Flower-class corvette. She was renamed HMS Hyderabad before her launch in 1941.
- HMS Nettle was a tender launched in 1933 as HMS Elfin. She was renamed Nettle in 1941, and placed on the sale list in 1957.

== See also ==
- HMS Nettleham
