= HMS Elfin =

HMS Elfin has been the name of more than one British Royal Navy ship, and may refer to:

- HMS Elfin (1849), a paddle yacht launched in 1849 and used for many years as a despatch-boat by the royal court, placed on the sale list in 1901
- HMS Elfin (1905), a tender, formerly the War Department vessel Dundas, transferred to the Royal Navy in 1905 and sold in 1928
- HMS Elfin (1933), a torpedo recovery vessel launched in 1933, renamed Nettle in 1941, sold in 1957, and now preserved in the Netherlands as Elfin
