= Royal Naval Museums, Portsmouth =

Naval museum in Portsmouth, England

Coordinates: 50.8007°N 1.1098°W

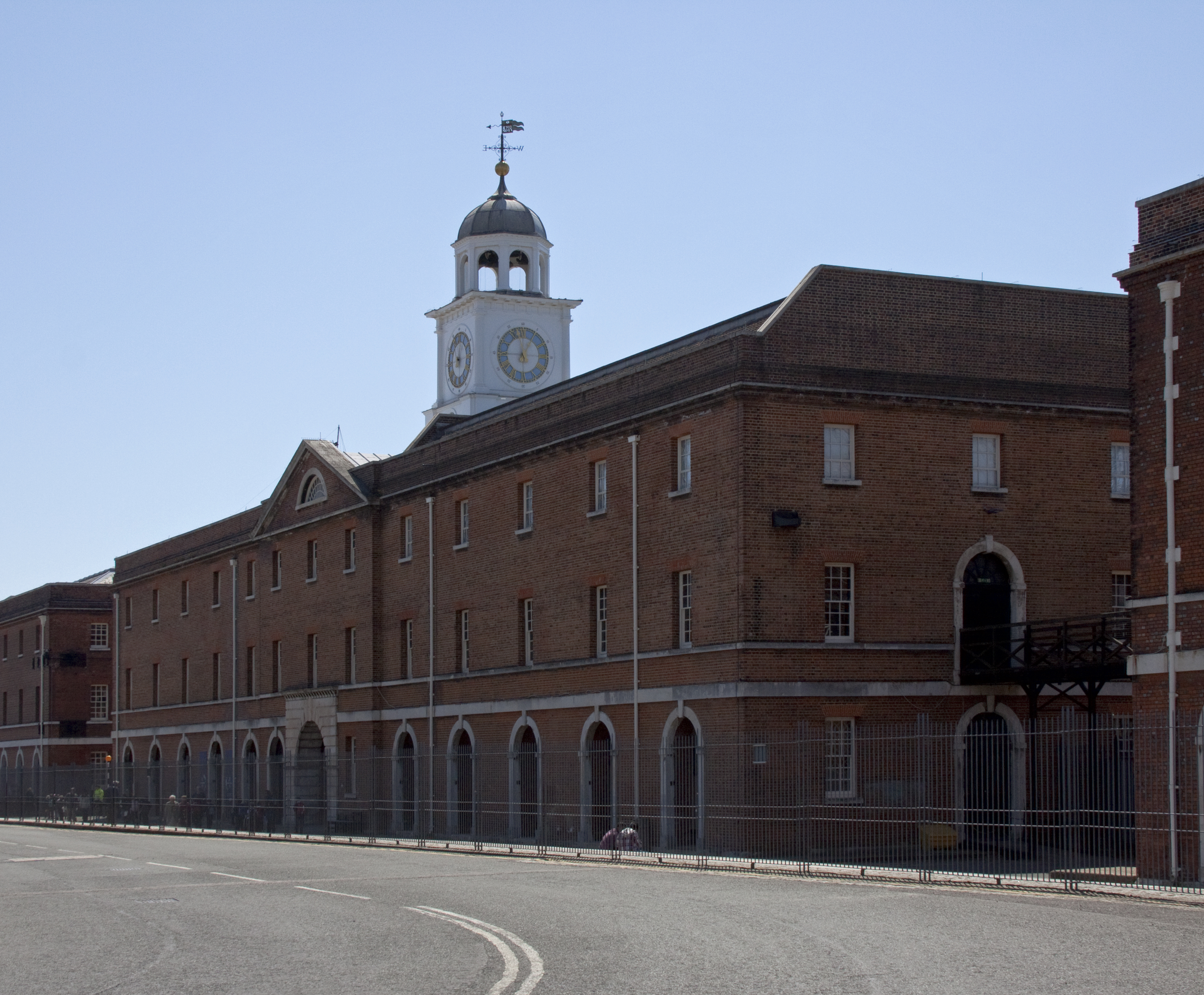
No. 10 Storehouse, which dates from 1776, has housed some of the museum's galleries since 1972.

The Royal Naval Museums, Portsmouth, formerly known as the National Museum of the Royal Navy, Portsmouth, is a museum of the history of the Royal Navy located in the Portsmouth Historic Dockyard section of HMNB Portsmouth, Portsmouth, Hampshire, England. The museum is part of the National Museum of the Royal Navy, a non-departmental public body sponsored by the Ministry of Defence. It received 1,081,909 visitors in 2017.

== History ==
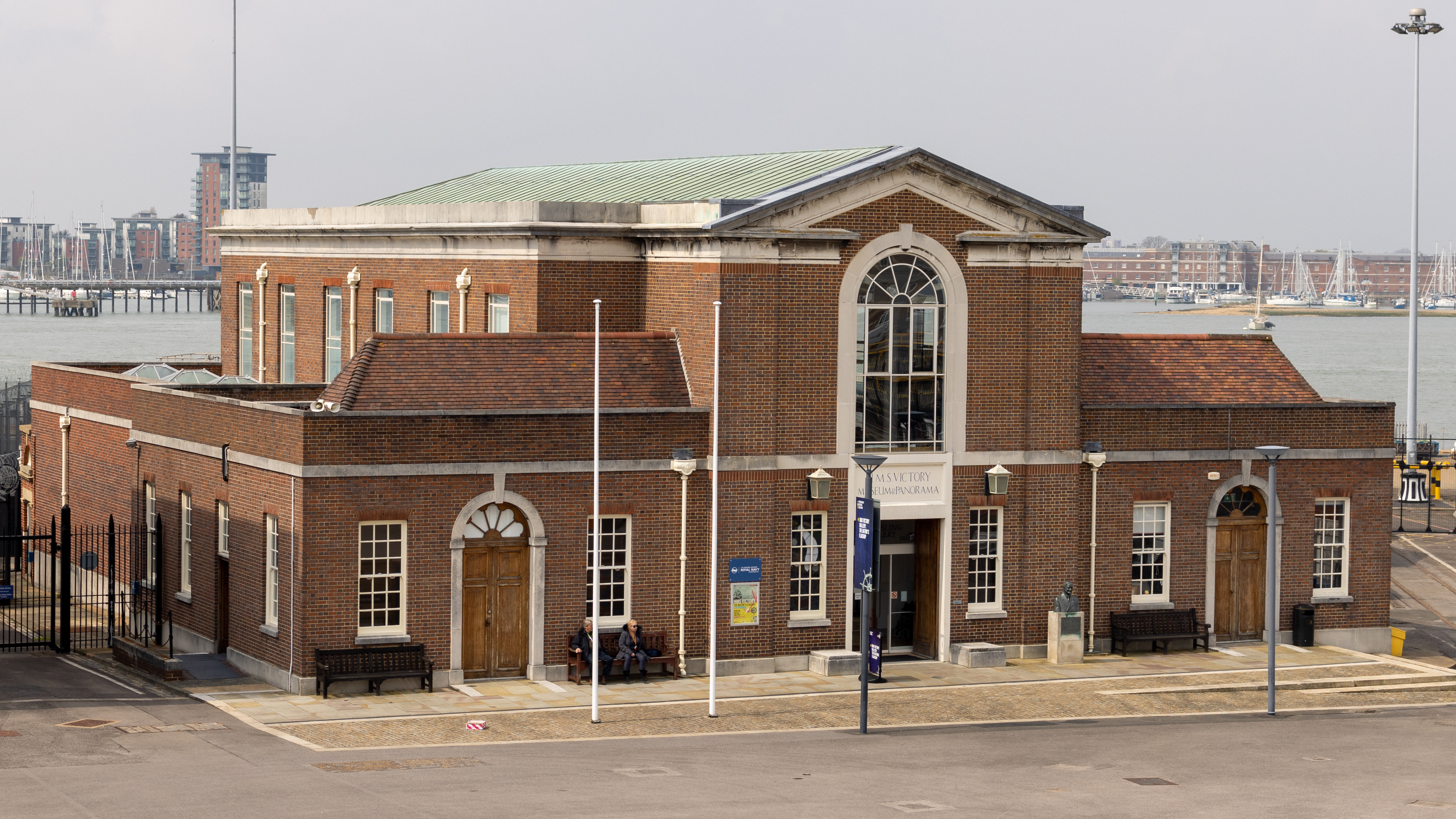
The Victory Gallery, viewed from the deck of HMS Victory: opened in 1938, it was the first purpose-built museum building in the dockyard.

The museum was founded in 1911. Known originally as the Dockyard Museum, it was conceived by Mr. Mark Edwin Pescott-Frost, then secretary to the Admiral Superintendent at Portsmouth. With a passion for naval history he spearheaded a project to save items for future generations, eventually leading to the opening of a museum (space having been made available for him in the eastern section of the Great Ropehouse). His foresight ensured the survival of many interesting and important artefacts, several of which are still on display today. He was awarded in 1916 the Imperial Service Order.

Following Pescott-Smith's retirement (in 1919) the museum was closed and its collections began to be dispersed. With the impending arrival of HMS Victory, however, (which was to be dry docked in the dockyard in 1922) a substantial number of items were retained for display with the ship. In 1929 the foundation stone was laid for a new purpose-built museum building, designed to display artefacts from HMS Victory; standing alongside the ship itself, the Victory Gallery was finally opened in 1938. In 1972 the museum began using the ground floor of the nearby No. 10 Storehouse as an exhibition space.

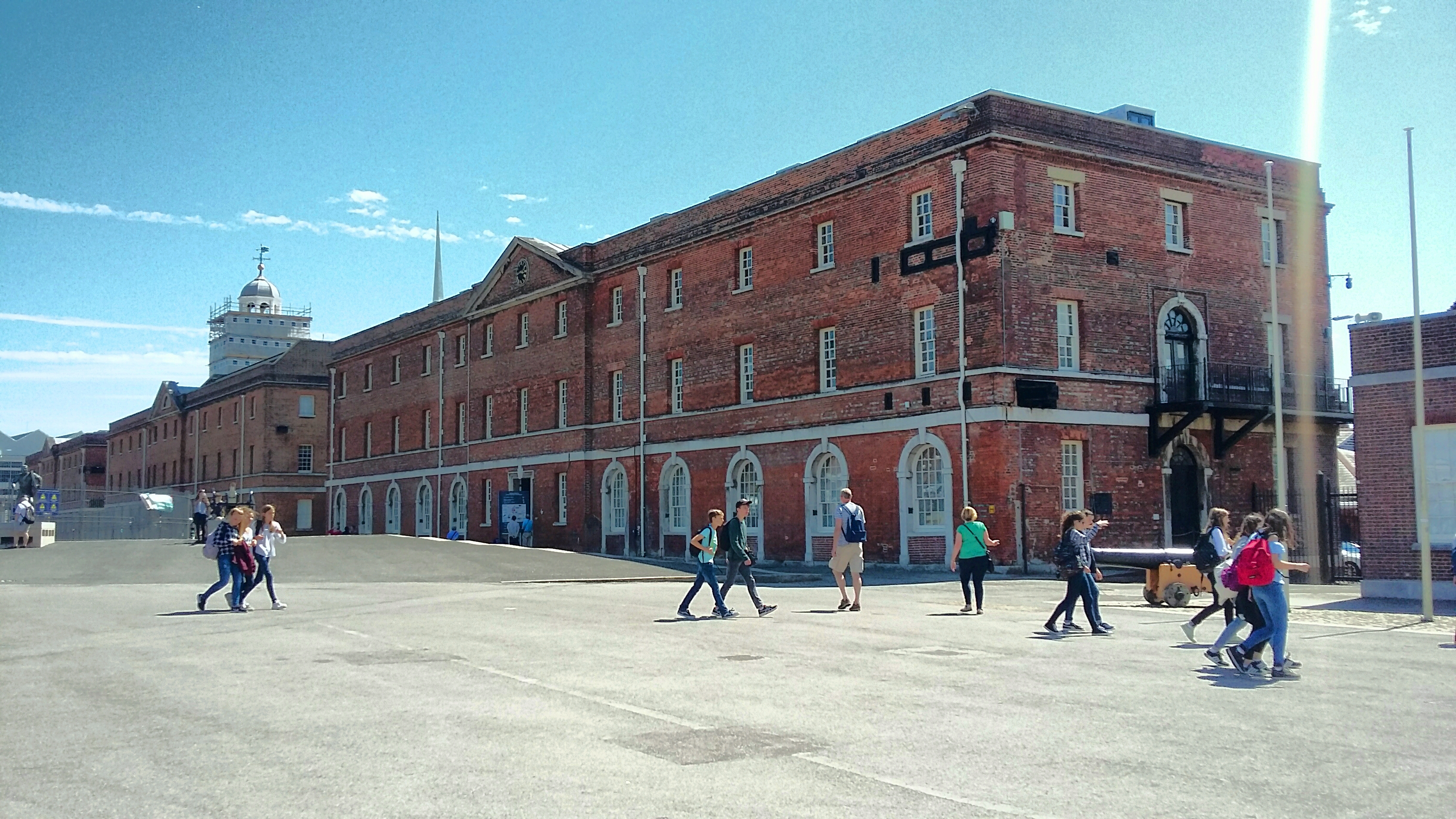
No. 11 Storehouse (built in 1763) became part of the museum in the 1980s.

In 1985, under the terms of the National Heritage Act 1983, the museum was devolved from the Ministry of Defence to become an executive non-departmental public body, supported by a grant-in-aid. At this juncture, the name was changed to become the "Royal Naval Museum, Portsmouth." The following year, the museum took over No. 11 Storehouse: the ground floor was used as an exhibition space and the upper floors as a library, offices and storage space. Not long afterwards a glass link corridor was opened between this and the adjacent storehouse, No. 10.

In 2008, the National Museum of the Royal Navy (NMRN) formally came into being with the express purpose of providing greater co-ordination of naval heritage in the broadest sense; following on from this, in 2010 the Royal Naval Museum became a full subsidiary of the National Museum of the Royal Navy and changed its name to "National Museum of the Royal Navy, Portsmouth". In 2014 the ground floor galleries of No. 10 Storehouse were refurbished and reopened as the Babcock Galleries.

== Buildings and exhibits ==
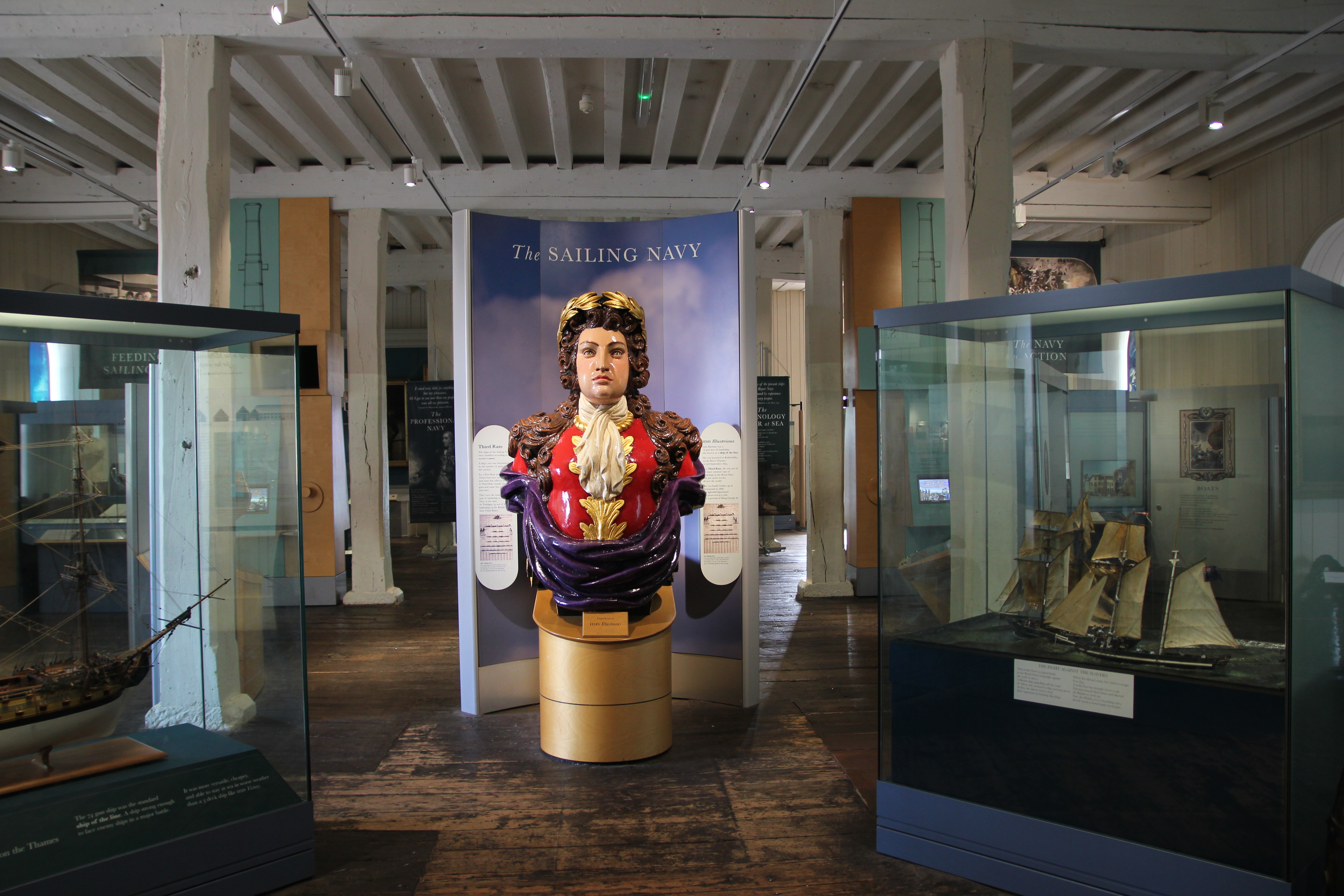
The Sailing Era Gallery in Storehouse 11.

The museum is housed in a row of three buildings which face HMS Victory. No. 11 Storehouse dates from 1763, and the adjacent No. 10 Storehouse from 1776; both are Grade I listed. The Victory Gallery is a purpose-built museum building of 1938. HMS M33, a World War I Monitor warship, is also part of the museum; she was opened to the public in 2015, her centenary year.

No. 11 Storehouse contains various exhibition spaces relating to the Age of Sail. The restored No. 10 Storehouse opened to the public in 2014 as the Babcock Galleries, housing a new permanent exhibition telling the story of the 20th- and 21st-century Navy, as well as temporary exhibition spaces. It also houses the Trafalgar Sail (the fore topsail of HMS Victory, said to be the largest surviving single original artefact from the Battle of Trafalgar). A new glass atrium links the two historic storehouses.

- Victory Gallery "tells the story of HMS Victory and the people who lived, worked and fought on board".
- Nelson Gallery tells the story of Horatio, Viscount Nelson.
- Sailing Navy Gallery tells of life at sea in the Sailing Navy.
- HMS Hear My Story tells "undiscovered stories from the ordinary men, women and ships which have made the Navy‘s amazing history over the last 100 years".

== See also ==
- Figureheads Collection Project: National Museum of the Royal Navy
