= T36 =

T-36 or T36 may refer to:

- T36 (classification), a disability sport classification
- Beechcraft XT-36, an American trainer aircraft
- ENAER T-36 Halcón, a Spanish jet training aircraft
- German torpedo boat T36
- HMS Redwing (1933), a submarine tender of the Royal Navy
- Self-propelled barge T-36, a Soviet barge
- Yaominami Station, Osaka, Japan
- Cooper T36, a British Formula Three racing car: see Cooper Mark IX
