= List of shipwrecks in August 1849 =

The list of shipwrecks in August 1849 includes ships sunk, foundered, wrecked, grounded, or otherwise lost during August 1849.

== 1 August ==
List of shipwrecks: 1 August 1849
Ship	State	Description
Eliza	United Kingdom	The sloop was in collision with the schooner Aspern (United Kingdom) and sank in the Firth of Forth. Her crew were rescued.
Enterprise	United Kingdom	The ship was discovered abandoned in the Atlantic Ocean off Flores Island, Azores. She was taken in to Flores Island.
Joven Daniel	Chilean Navy	El Naufraigio del Joven Daniel - painting by Raymond Monvoisin. The brigantine was wrecked at the mouth of the Toltén. All on board survived and made a camp on shore. They were attacked by the Curín tribe and all but one of them were murdered. Joven Daniel was on a voyage from Valparaíso to Valdivia.
Mary Campbell	United Kingdom	The ship ran aground off Amrum, Duchy of Holstein and was abandoned by her crew. She was on a voyage from Peterhead, Aberdeenshire to Hamburg.
Orelia	United Kingdom	The ship capsized at Penzance, Cornwall.
Provence	France	The felucca was wrecked on the East Planna Key. She was on a voyage from Port-au-Prince, Haiti to Marseille, Bouches-du-Rhône.
Scotia	United Kingdom	The ship was driven ashore on Mandan Island, Province of Canada, British North America. She was on a voyage from Glasgow, Renfrewshire to Quebec City, Province of Canada. She was refloated and towed in to Quebec City.

== 2 August ==
List of shipwrecks: 2 August 1849
Ship	State	Description
Ceres	United Kingdom	The ship ran aground of the Dragoe Reef, in the Baltic Sea. She was on a voyage from Riga, Russia to Bridgwater, Somerset. She was refloated the next day and taken in to Copenhagen, Denmark for repairs.
Isabella Muston	United Kingdom	The ship was driven ashore at St. Stephano's Point, Ottoman Empire. She was on a voyage from the Danube to a British port. She was refloated.

== 3 August ==
List of shipwrecks: 3 August 1849
Ship	State	Description
Beaver	United Kingdom	The ship was driven ashore at Eyemouth, Berwickshire. She was on a voyage from Saint John, New Brunswick, British North America to Eyemouth.
Graham	United Kingdom	The ship was sunk by ice in Hudson Bay. Eight of her twelve crew survived, four were declared missing.
Opgaende Sol	Portugal	The ship ran aground at St. Ubes. She was on a voyage from St. Ubes to a Norwegian port. She was refloated and taken in to St. Ubes for repairs.
Mary Ellen	United Kingdom	The smack struck a sunken rock and foundered off Crow Point, Pembrokeshire. Her crew were rescued. She was on a voyage from Neath, Glamorgan to Red Wharf Bay, Anglesey.

== 4 August ==
List of shipwrecks: 4 August 1849
Ship	State	Description
Beccles	United Kingdom	The ship ran aground on a reef off Cape Lopez, Africa. She was on a voyage from Bonny, Africa to Liverpool, Lancashire.
Gertrudes	Spain	The ship was wrecked on Anegada de Adrento, Mexico. Her crew were rescued. She was on a voyage from Barcelona to Cádiz and Veracruz, Mexico.
Marietta	Trieste	The ship capsized at Cardiff, Glamorgan, United Kingdom. She was on a voyage from Cardiff to Malta. She was refloated and beached at Penarth, Glamorgan.
Pearl	(United Kingdom of Great Britain and Ireland) British North America	The schooner was destroyed by fire at "Isdore". Her crew were rescued. She was on a voyage from Labrador to Halifax, Nova Scotia.
Trintje	Netherlands	The smack ran aground off Heligoland and was damaged. She was later refloated and put in to Cuxhaven in a leaky condition. She arrived on 6 August.
Yathanayee	India	The ship was wrecked east of Saugor Point. She was on a voyage from Calcutta to Rangoon, Burma.

== 5 August ==
List of shipwrecks: 5 August 1849
Ship	State	Description
London	United Kingdom	The ship was driven ashore at Dublin. She was on a voyage from Memel, Prussia to Dublin. She was refloated.
Victor Jules	France	The ship was in collision with a lugger off the Longships and was abandoned. Her crew were rescued. She was on a voyage from Nantes, Loire-Inférieure to Newport, Monmouthshire, United Kingdom of Great Britain and Ireland. She was taken in to the Isles of Scilly, United Kingdom in a waterlogged condition on 6 August.

== 6 August ==
List of shipwrecks: 6 August 1849
Ship	State	Description
Sybil	United Kingdom	The ship was driven ashore at Wexford. She was on a voyage from Wexford to Newport, Monmouthshire. She was refloated the next day and put back to Wexford in a leaky condition.

== 7 August ==
List of shipwrecks: 7 August 1849
Ship	State	Description
Amalia	Greece	The brig ran aground at Point St. Elmo, Malta. She was on a voyage from La Spezia, Grand Duchy of Tuscany to Cork, United Kingdom. She was refloated.
Hoturangi	(United Kingdom of Great Britain and Ireland) New Zealand	The schooner foundered with the loss of all hands.
Neptune	(United Kingdom of Great Britain and Ireland) New Zealand	The schooner was wrecked in Hawkes Bay, Her crew were rescued.

== 8 August ==
List of shipwrecks: 8 August 1849
Ship	State	Description
Acorn	United Kingdom	The brig was abandoned in the Atlantic Ocean. Her crew were rescued by Manto (United States). Acorn was on a voyage from Liverpool, Lancashire to Boston, Massachusetts, United States.
May	United Kingdom	The schooner was driven ashore at Lampsacas, Ottoman Empire. She was refloated.
Prinz von Preussen	Prussia	The steamship was severely damaged by fire at Swinemünde.
Sarah	United Kingdom	The schooner was run down and sunk in the River Mersey by Fairy (United Kingdom). Her crew were rescued. She was on a voyage from Bridgwater, Somerset to Liverpool, Lancashire.

== 9 August ==
List of shipwrecks: 9 August 1849
Ship	State	Description
Friends	United Kingdom	The sloop was driven ashore and wrecked at Rattray Head, Aberdeenshire. She was abandoned by her crew, who were presumed to have perished.
Numa	United Kingdom	The ship was abandoned in the Atlantic Ocean. She was on a voyage from Saint Stephen, New Brunswick, British North America to Liverpool, Lancashire.

== 10 August ==
List of shipwrecks: 10 August 1849
Ship	State	Description
HDMS Bellona	Royal Danish Navy	First Schleswig War: The fourth rate frigate ran aground in the Elbe whilst blockading Hamburg.
Providence	France	The ship was wrecked on Heneagua, Bahamas. Her crew were rescued. She was on a voyage from Saint Domingo to Marseille, Bouches-du-Rhône, France.
Tipula	United Kingdom	The ship ran aground at Barber's Point, in the Dardanelles. She was refloated on 13 August.

== 11 August ==
List of shipwrecks: 11 August 1849
Ship	State	Description
Betty	Sweden	The schooner capsized off Cape Finisterre, Spain with the loss of four of her seven crew. She was on a voyage from Gävle to Marseille, Bouches-du-Rhône, France.
Johanne Marie	Denmark	The ship was wrecked at Fanø. She was on a voyage from Seaham, County Durham. United Kingdom to Fanø.
Maria	United Kingdom	The ship was driven ashore at "Mellneragen", Prussia. Her crew were rescued.

== 12 August ==
List of shipwrecks: 12 August 1849
Ship	State	Description
Nicolene	Norway	The ship was driven ashore at Rattray Head, Aberdeenshire, United Kingdom. Her crew were rescued. She was on a voyage from Brevik to Wick, Caithness, United Kingdom.
Otto	Stralsund	The ship ran aground off Læsø, Denmark. She was on a voyage from Stralsund to Stockton-on-Tees, County Durham, United Kingdom. She was refloated on 14 August and resumed her voyage.

== 13 August ==
List of shipwrecks: 13 August 1849
Ship	State	Description
Finish	United Kingdom	The schooner was driven ashore at Cairnbulg, Aberdeenshire. She was on a voyage from Sandhaven, Aberdeenshire to Burntisland, Fife.
Romulus	United Kingdom	The brig sprang a leak and foundered off Cromer, Norfolk. Her crew were rescued by Wright (United Kingdom).

== 14 August ==
List of shipwrecks: 14 August 1849
Ship	State	Description
Courier de la Rainee	France	The ship caught fire at Cette, Hérault.
Dorade	France	The ship was driven ashore and wrecked at "Douras Narin", County Donegal, United Kingdom. She was on a voyage from Bordeaux, Gironde to Ballina, County Mayo, United Kingdom.

== 15 August ==
List of shipwrecks: 15 August 1849
Ship	State	Description
Friendship	United Kingdom	The brig ran aground off Scharhörn and sank. Her crew were rescued. She was on a voyage from Liverpool, Lancashire to Hamburg.
Fortuna	Flag unknown	The ship ran aground on the Brake Sand, in the North Sea. She was on a voyage from London, United Kingdom to St. Ubes, Portugal. She was refloated and put in to Ramsgate, Kent, United Kingdom in a leaky condition.
John Mowlem	United Kingdom	The ship ran aground on the Pennington Spit, in the Solent. she was on a voyage from South Shields, County Durham to Weymouth, Dorset. She was refloated the next day and taken in to Yarmouth, Islr of Wight.
St. Olai	Portugal	The ship ran aground on the Flemish Banks, in the North Sea. She was on a voyage from Pärnu, Russia to Porto. She was refloated and put in to Great Yarmouth, Norfolk, United kingdom in a leaky condition.

== 16 August ==
List of shipwrecks: 16 August 1849
Ship	State	Description
Gipsy	(United Kingdom of Great Britain and Ireland) New Zealand	The schooner was wrecked at Cape Turnagain during a heavy gale. All hands were saved.
Marmeluke	United Kingdom	The ship was wrecked on Freshwater Point, Newfoundland, British North America. Her crew were rescued She was on a voyage from Sunderland, County Durham to Quebec City, Province of Canada, British North America.

== 17 August ==
List of shipwrecks: 17 August 1849
Ship	State	Description
Adeline	United Kingdom	The ship was in collision with another vessel and ran aground in the River Tyne.
Admiral	United Kingdom	The ship was wrecked on Cape Negro, Nova Scotia. British North America. Her crew were rescued. She was on a voyage from Liverpool, Lancashire to Saint John, New Brunswick, British North America.
Ann Hall's	United Kingdom	The ship was driven ashore and damaged on Cape Sable Island, Nova Scotia. She was on a voyage from Saint John to London. She was refloated and taken in to "Cherbouque" in a waterlogged condition.
Dee	United Kingdom	The flat sank in the River Dee.
Freedom	United Kingdom	The ship ran aground in the Elbe near Schulau. She was on a voyage from Hamburg to London. She was refloated and taken in to Cuxhaven in a leaky condition.
Neptune	United Kingdom	The smack was in collision with the paddle steamer Blenheim (United Kingdom) and foundered off the Calf of Man, Isle of Man. She was on a voyage from Newport, Monmouthshire to Port-le-Murray, Isle of Man.
Vesta	United Kingdom	The steamship ran aground on the Skerry of Ness. She was on a voyage from Leith, Lothian to Thurso, Caithnes.

== 18 August ==
List of shipwrecks: 18 August 1849
Ship	State	Description
Arsene	France	The ship was driven ashore and damaged at Europa Point, Gibraltar. She was on a voyage from Port-la-Nouvelle, Aude to Rouen, Seine-Inférieure. She was refloated.
Parrsboro'	United Kingdom	The ship was driven ashore at Höganäs, Sweden. She was on a voyage from Riga, Russia to Dundee, Forfarshire. She was refloated on 20 August and resumed her voyage.

== 19 August ==
List of shipwrecks: 19 August 1849
Ship	State	Description
Admiral	United Kingdom	The brig ran aground on the Goodwin Sands, Kent. She was on a voyage from Riga, Russia to Bridport, Dorset. She was refloated and taken in to Ramsgate Kent in a leaky condition.
Catherine Ann	(United Kingdom of Great Britain and Ireland) New Zealand	The schooner was driven ashore and wrecked near Port Gore.
Liffey	United Kingdom	The brig was wrecked on the Cobler Rocks, in Long Bay, Barbados. She was on a voyage from Newport, Monmouthshire to Grenada.
Lucy and Mary	United Kingdom	The ship ran aground on the Kentish Knock. She was refloated but consequently sank. Her crew were rescued. She was on a voyage from Middlesbrough, Yorkshire to Deal, Kent.
Roland	France	The ship was wrecked on the Creston Rocks, off Mazatlan, Cuba with the loss of 30 lives. Survivors were rescued by HMS Champion (Royal Navy).

== 20 August ==
List of shipwrecks: 20 August 1849
Ship	State	Description
Middleton	United Kingdom	The ship ran aground in the Ems. She was on a voyage from Emden, Kingdom of Hanover to Valparaíso, Chile. She was refloated and put back to Emden.
Orion	France	The ship was lost near Marseille, Bouches-du-Rhône. She was on a voyage from Port-la-Nouvelle, Aude to Marseille.
Woolsington	United Kingdom	The ship was wrecked on Castle Island, Bahamas. Her crew were rescued. She was on a voyage from Jamaica to Liverpool, Lancashire.

== 21 August ==
List of shipwrecks: 22 August 1849
Ship	State	Description
Liffey	United Kingdom	The brig was wrecked on the Cobler's Rock, off Barbados. Her crew were rescued. She was on a voyage from Newport, Monmouthshire to Grenada.
Samarang	United Kingdom	The ship was wrecked in the Maldives. Her crew were rescued by Sophia (United Kingdom). Samarang was on a voyage from Mauritius to Ceylon.

== 22 August ==
List of shipwrecks: 22 August 1849
Ship	State	Description
Mutual	United Kingdom	The brig sprang a leak and sank off Bawdsey, Suffolk. Her crew were rescued. She was on a voyage from Newcastle upon Tyne, Northumberland to London.

== 23 August ==
List of shipwrecks: 23 August 1849
Ship	State	Description
Challenger	United Kingdom	The ship was wrecked near LaHave, Nova Scotia, British North America. She was on a voyage from Sydney, Nova Scotia, British North America to Boston, Massachusetts, United States.
Deux Cousins	France	The ship was wrecked at Agde, Hérault. She was on a voyage from Seville, Spain to Agde.
London Merchant	United Kingdom	The steamship was driven ashore at Great Yarmouth, Norfolk. She was on a voyage from Newcastle upon Tyne, Northumberland to London. She was refloated and resumed her voyage.
Swallow	United Kingdom	The schooner ran aground on the Pentland Skerries. She was on a voyage from Caernarfon to Memel, Prussia. She floated off but consequently sank. Her crew were rescued.
Wiedersehen	Prussia	The barque was abandoned in the Mediterranean Sea 100 nautical miles (190 km) off Dénia, Spain. She was on a voyage from Liverpool, Lancashire, United Kingdom to Alexandria, Egypt.

== 24 August ==
List of shipwrecks: 24 August 1849
Ship	State	Description
Enchantress	(United Kingdom of Great Britain and Ireland) Cape Colony	The ship was wrecked between the Green Point Lighthouse and Mouille Point. All on board were rescued. She was on a voyage from Cape Town to Port Natal.
Lady Caroline	United Kingdom	The ship was driven ashore near Boston, Massachusetts. She was on a voyage from Newcastle upon Tyne, Northumberland to Boston. She was refloated and towed in to Boston.
Victoria	United Kingdom	The barque was wrecked on the Pentland Skerries. She was on a voyage from Liverpool, Lancashire to Kronstadt, Russia. She was refloated on 26 September and taken in to the Acumster Creek, near Clyth, Caithness.

== 25 August ==
List of shipwrecks: 25 August 1849
Ship	State	Description
Blonde	United Kingdom	The ship was driven ashore on Cape Sable Island, Nova Scotia, British North America. Her crew were rescued. She was on a voyage from Montreal, Province of Canada, British North America to the Clyde.
Dawn	United Kingdom	The brig was wrecked at Trepassey, Nova Scotia. She was on a voyage from Westport, Nova Scotia to an Irish port.
Phœbe	United Kingdom	The ship was wrecked at the mouth of the Penna River with the loss of a crew member. She was on a voyage from Coringa to Madras, India.

== 26 August ==
List of shipwrecks: 26 August 1849
Ship	State	Description
Brigand	United Kingdom	The ship ran aground on the Barber Sand, in the North Sea off the coast of Norfolk. She was on a voyage from Newcastle upon Tyne to Dover, Kent. She was refloated the next day.
Damsel	United Kingdom	The ship was in collision with Nymph (United Kingdom) and sank off the mouth of the Humber. Her crew were rescued.
Dolphin	United Kingdom	The ship was driven ashore on Flotta, Orkney Islands. She was on a voyage from Liverpool, Lancashire to Kronstadt, Russia. She was refloated on 30 August and taken in to Stromness, Orkney Islands.
Louise	Stettin	The ship was in collision with another vessel and sank off Møn, Denmark. She was on a voyage from "Stevens" to Stettin.
Mary Ann	United Kingdom	The ship was driven ashore and sank near Girvan, Ayrshire. She was on a voyage from the Clyde to Demerara, British Guiana.
Roland	France	The full-rigged ship was wrecked on Criston Island, off Mazatlan, Cuba with some loss of life.
Victoria	United Kingdom	The ship sprang a leak and was abandoned in the North Sea. Her crew were rescued. She was on a voyage from Holbæk, Denmark to Great Yarmouth, Norfolk.

== 27 August ==
List of shipwrecks: 27 August 1849
Ship	State	Description
Fides	Kingdom of Hanover	The ship was driven ashore at the entrance to the Agger Canal. Her crew were rescued. She was on a voyage from Hull, Yorkshire, United Kingdom to a Baltic port.
Swallow	United Kingdom	The ship struck the Pentland Skerries and sank. Her crew were rescued. She was on a voyage from Caernarfon to Memel, Prussia.

== 27 August ==
List of shipwrecks: 27 August 1849
Ship	State	Description
Rosalind	United Kingdom	The ship ran aground and was severely damaged on a reef off Otaheite. She was refloated but was consequently condemned.

== 28 August ==
List of shipwrecks: 28 August 1849
Ship	State	Description
Anna Maria	Hamburg	The ship ran aground on the Banjaard Sand, in the North Sea off the Dutch coast. She was on a voyage from Antwerp, Belgium to Hamburg. She was refloated and out in to Brouwershaven, Zeeland, Netherlands in a leaky condition.
Douglas	(United Kingdom of Great Britain and Ireland) Cape Colony	The ship ran aground on the Lee Bank. She was on a voyage from Table Bay to D'Urban.
Harmony	United Kingdom	The ship ran aground on the Ryeman Rock, off the south coast of Cornwall.
Helmsley	United Kingdom	The ship was driven ashore in the Eider. Her crew were rescued. She was on a voyage from Inverkeithing, Fife to Rendsburg, Duchy of Schleswig.
Margaret	United Kingdom	The schooner ran aground on the Goodwin Sands, Kent. She was on a voyage from Galaţi, Ottoman Empire to Great Yarmouth, Norfolk. She was refloated and taken in to Deal, Kent before resuming her voyage.
Rose Julienne	France	The ship was wrecked near Ciudad del Carmen, Mexico. She was on a voyage from Guadeloupe to Saint Thomas, Virgin Islands and Ciudad del Carmen.

== 29 August ==
List of shipwrecks: 29 August 1849
Ship	State	Description
Brightman	United Kingdom	The ship was driven ashore 2 nautical miles (3.7 km) from Worthing, Sussex. She was on a voyage from London to Sydney, New South Wales. She was refloated the next day and resumed her voyage.
Geertruida	Netherlands	The barque was abandoned off the coast of the Cape Colony with the loss of seven of her 25 crew. Survivors were rescued by HMS Minerva (Royal Navy). Geertruida was on a voyage from Banjoewangi, Netherlands East Indies to Amsterdam, North Holland.
Jane Bird	United Kingdom	The ship ran aground on the Swine Bottoms, in the Baltic Sea. She was on a voyage from Saint Petersburg, Russia to London. She was refloated and put in to Copenhagen, Denmark.
Phoebe	United Kingdom	The ship was wrecked at Madras, India with the loss of a crew member.
No. 5	Imperial Russian Navy	The barge ran aground and was subsequently wrecked in the Caspian Sea at Lenkoran. Her crew survived.

== 30 August ==
List of shipwrecks: 30 September 1849
Ship	State	Description
Fruiterer	(United Kingdom of Great Britain and Ireland) Jersey	The ship was wrecked on Belle Isle, Newfoundland, British North America. She was on a voyage from "Lance-au-Loupe" to a port in Labrador.
Three Sisters	United Kingdom	The sloop foundered off "Fratagel Head", Cornwall. Her crew were rescued.
Tuskar	United Kingdom	The ship ran aground off Isle Madam, Nova Scotia, British North America. She was refloated and towed in to Quebec City Province of Canada by the steamship North America ( (United Kingdom of Great Britain and Ireland) British North America).

== 31 August ==
List of shipwrecks: 31 August 1849
Ship	State	Description
Flora	Norway	The ship was driven ashore on Scotsman Head, Aberdeenshire, United Kingdom. She waso on a voyage from Østerrisør to Wick, Caithness, United Kingdom. She was refloated and resumed her voyage.
Gibraltar	United Kingdom	The ship departed from Dominica. No further trace, presumed foundered with the loss of all hands.
Hibernia	United Kingdom	The paddle steamer was driven ashore at Chedabucto Head, Nova Scotia, British North America. She was on a voyage from Boston, Massachusetts, United States to Liverpool, Lancashire. Temporary repairs were made and she was refloated the next day, departing for Liverpool. She consequently put back to Halifax, Nova Scotia in a leaky condition on 7 September.
Jantina	Netherlands	The ship was driven ashore at Souter Point, County Durham, United Kingdom. She was on a voyage from Hull, Yorkshire to Newcastle upon Tyne, Northumberland. She was refloated on 2 September and taken in to Sunderland, County Durham.
Lady Mary Pelham	United Kingdom	The barque was wrecked at Port Fairy, New South Wales. Her crew survived.
Psyche	United Kingdom	The ship was sighted in the Atlantic Ocean (41°00′N 10°30′W) whilst on a voyage from Málaga, Spain to Dublin. No further trace, presumed foundered with the loss of all hands.
Sylphide	(Russian Empire) Grand Duchy of Finland	The ship ran aground off Ljugarn, Sweden. She was on a voyage from Helsinki to Málaga, Spain.
Union	United Kingdom	The ship ran aground on the Swine Bottoms, in the Baltic Sea. She was on a voyage from Memel, Prussia to Cardiff, Glamorgan. She was refloated on 2 September and resumed her voyage.

== Unknown date ==
List of shipwrecks: Unknown date August 1849
Ship	State	Description
Alexandre	France	The brig ran aground on the Lay. She was on a voyage from Saint-Maurice-le-Girard, Vendée to Newcastle upon Tyne, Northumberland, United Kingdom. She was refloated and put in to Saint-Martin-de-Ré, Charente-Maritime for repairs. She arrived on 18 August.
Ann Hall	United Kingdom	The ship was driven ashore on the coast of Nova Scotia, British North America before 24 August. She was on a voyage from Saint John, New Brunswick, British North America to Liverpool, Lancashire. She was refloated and put in to "Chebique", where she was condemned.
Avenger	(United Kingdom of Great Britain and Ireland) New South Wales	The cutter was wrecked on Erromanga Island, New Hebrides before 11 August.
Brothers	United Kingdom	The ship was wrecked on Cape Sable Island, Nova Scotia before 20 August. Her crew were rescued. She was on a voyage from Cumberland, Nova Scotia to Runcorn, Cheshire.
Caledonia	United Kingdom	The ship was driven ashore in the Rabbit Islands, Ottoman Empire. She was on a voyage from Ancona, Papal States to Constantinople, Ottoman Empire. She was refloated but subsequently drove ashore on the coast of Troy. She was again refloated and reached the Dardanelles on 13 August. She was taken in to Constantinople for repairs.
Comfort	(United Kingdom of Great Britain and Ireland) New Zealand	The schooner left Wellington on August 22 and was found upside down in Queen Charlotte Sound some time later. All seven on board perished.
Hoturangi	(United Kingdom of Great Britain and Ireland) New Zealand	The schooner was wrecked on the east coast of New Zealand with the loss of all hands.
Neptune	(United Kingdom of Great Britain and Ireland) New Zealand	The schooner was wrecked near Long Point (Taramahiti Point) on the Māhia Peninsula during a heavy gale. All hands were saved.
Elizabeth	Netherlands	The ship caught fire and was scuttled at Lodshaven, Denmark between 11 and 31 August. She was on a voyage from Palermo, Sicily to Dordrecht, South Holland.
Emily	(United Kingdom of Great Britain and Ireland) New Zealand	The schooner was wrecked in Palliser Bay before 4 August.
Isabella Anna	(United Kingdom of Great Britain and Ireland) New South Wales	The ship was wrecked on the Isle of Pines, New Caledonia before 21 August.
Marie Antoinette	Belgium	The ship was driven ashore on Bear's Cut, Florida, United States before 20 August. She was on a voyage from Antwerp to Havana, Cuba. She was refloated and put in to Key West, Florida.
Prince of Wales	United Kingdom	The ship was driven ashore on Rathlin Island, County Donegal after 11 August. She was on a voyage from Greenock, Renfrewshire to Saint John, New Brunswick, British North America. She was later refloated and put back to Greenock, where she arrived on 8 September.
William Brandt	Russia	The ship was driven ashore at "Pissen" on the coast of Courland. She was on a voyage from Riga to Cowes, Isle of Wight, United Kingdom. She was refloated on 21 August and resumed her voyage.
