= Three Mariners =

Historic building in Scarborough, England

Coordinates: 54°17′04″N 0°23′18″W

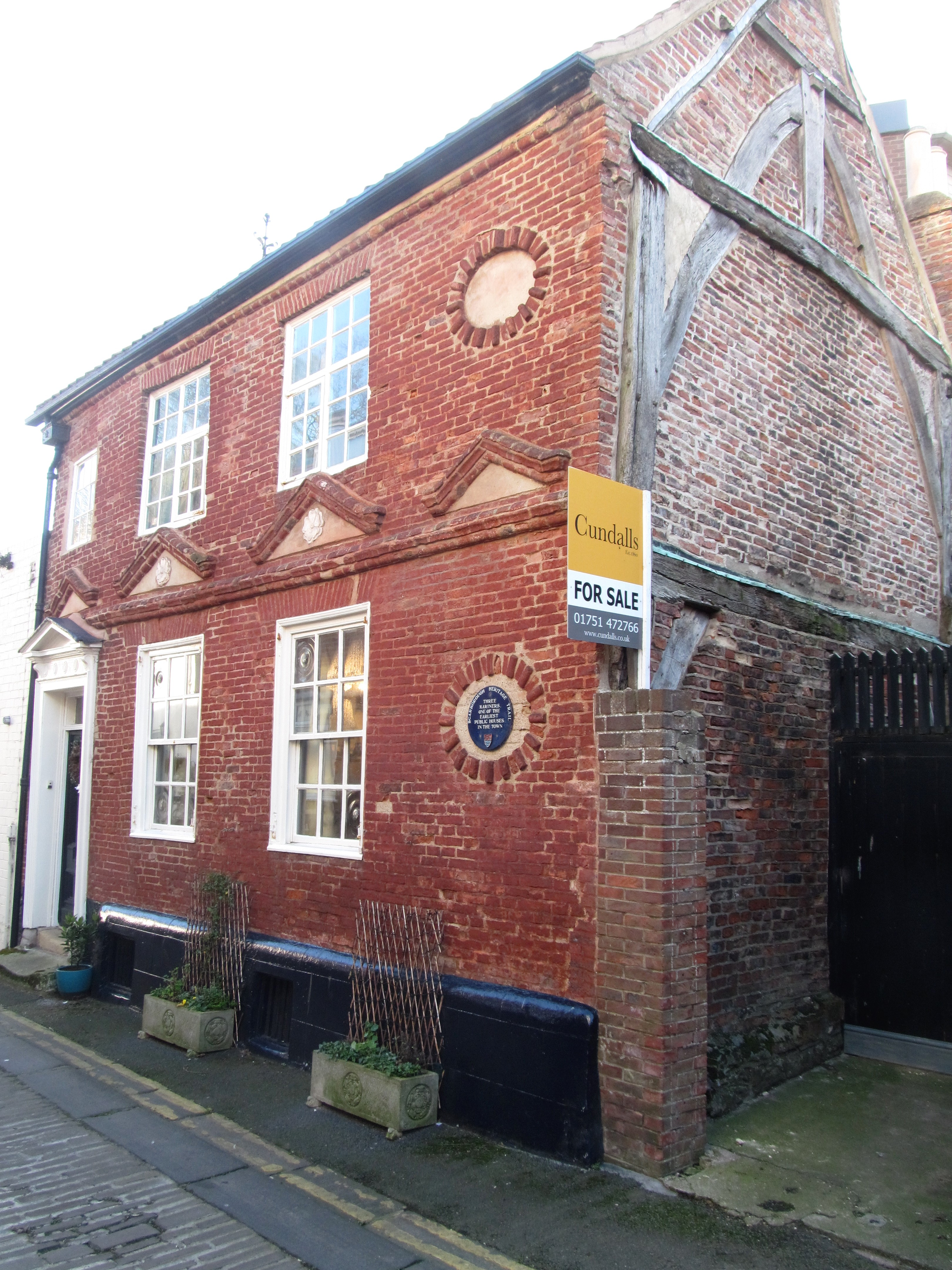
The building, in 2016

The Three Mariners is a historic building in Scarborough, North Yorkshire, a town in England.

The building was constructed in the 15th or 16th century. It was originally a much larger building, perhaps part of the same structure as 45 Quay Street, although the two are now separate. It is a timber framed building, but in the late 17th century the external walls were rebuilt in brick, in the Artisan Mannerist style. The front door and some of the windows were replaced in the 18th century. The building became a public house named the "Blockmakers Arms", in reference to the local shipbuilding industry. It was later renamed the "Three Mariners", and became popular with local artists in the Victorian period. In the early 20th century, it was converted into a museum, and a figurehead was installed above the side entrance. Later in the century, the museum closed, and it was converted into a house. The building has been grade II* listed since 1953.

The building has a timber framed core enclosed in red brick, leaving the west front exposed with brick infill. It has two storeys and four bays, a plinth, a moulded brick eaves cornice, and a pantile roof. The doorway in the left bay has an architrave, a false oblong fanlight, a frieze with fluting and roundels, and a cornice and pediment on small brackets. Above the ground floor are four pediments in moulded brick on a string course in moulded brick, and in the right bay is a carved brick roundel ornament on both floors. The windows on the ground flor are sashes, and the upper floor contains a small window in the left bay, and two mullioned and transomed casement windows in the middle bays. Inside, the front ground floor room has panelling from around 1700.

== See also ==
- Grade II* listed buildings in North Yorkshire (district)
- Listed buildings in Scarborough (Castle Ward)
