= HMS Seaflower (1873) =

British screw propulsion training brig

HMS Seaflower was a screw propulsion training brig launched at Pembroke Dockyard in 1873.

The vessel was stationed at Portland from 1879 as a tender to the training ship HMS Boscawen (1844). From 1904, it was used as a workshop before being sold to Castles for breaking up in 1908.

== Figurehead ==
The figurehead was saved when the ship was broken up and is now part of the National Museum of the Royal Navy's collection at Portsmouth.
