= HMS Elfin (1849) =

English paddle yacht, 1849–1901

HMS Elfin was built as a paddle yacht and launched from Chatham Dockyard in 1849, powered by two 20 hp engines.

== Career ==
HMs Elfin had an uneventful naval career, beginning by becoming a tender to the first Royal Yacht, HMY Victoria and Albert (1843) in 1849.

The ship was dominantly used as a dispatch boat, carrying papers for the royal household between Osborne House on the Isle of Wight and Portsmouth or Southampton, earning the local nickname 'the milk boat'.

Elfin was broken up at Portsmouth in 1901.

== Figurehead ==
An original sketch for the figurehead survives within the collection of The National Archives, designed by James Edward Hellyer Snr of Hellyer & Sons of Portsmouth, provided on an outline provided by Chatham Dockyard. The original estimate for the carving, which recommended a full-length figure, was £20 (approximately £2,160 today). Both the initial design and cost were accepted by the Surveyor of the Navy.

However, in 1849, Hellyer & Sons submitted another design for a 'neat busthead', for an estimate of £5 (almost £540 today) and it was in this form that the figurehead you see today was carved. The reason for the change in design is unknown.
