= Hellyer & Sons =

Family of ships figurehead carvers

The Hellyers were a family of wood carvers based in Portsmouth and London during the nineteenth century.

== Overview ==
Contracted to Portsmouth Dockyard from 1851, the Hellyers specialised in the carving of ships’ figureheads for the Royal Navy from their two workshops until the cessation of business in 1901.

== Edward Hellyer ==
Edward Hellyer, the son of shipwright, Phillip Hellyer, was apprenticed as a carver to an Edward Balter in Rotherhithe, Surrey in 1773 according to the Register of Duties Paid for Apprentices' Indentures, 1771–1773.

He went on to establish the family business, Hellyer & Son (later James Hellyer & Son and Hellyer & Sons), working as a 'ship carver' for the Royal Navy. During this time he designed and carved numerous figureheads including:

Vessel	Year	Designed	Carved	Notes
HMS Illustrious	1803	Yes	Yes	Original figurehead design submitted by Edward Hellyer for a price of £21 (approx. £1,381.59 today). Another design was submitted by Hellyer in 1816 to replace the original, but was rejected in favour of a coat of arms, for which he was allowed just £16 (approx. £1,162.91 today).
HMS Madagascar	1812	Yes	Yes	Design submitted by Edward Hellyer & Son with an estimate of £6 (approx. £362.04 today). Sketch in colour rather than usual black and white. Similar in appearance to the Bombay (modern day Mumbai) carved figurehead for the 1822 ship of the same name.
HMS Apollo Design for HMS Apollo by Edward Hellyer & Sons, 1817, (TNA – ADM 106/1889)	1817	Yes	Yes	This design was a replacement figurehead for the original from 1805, submitted by Edward Hellyer & Son for a cost of £15 (approx. £1,090 today)
HMS Minerva	1820	Yes	Unknown	The original full-length design from 1819 by Edward Hellyer & Son was rejected. A bust was requested instead and the carvers allowed £8 (approx. £595 today)

== James Edward Hellyer (Snr.) ==
James Edward Hellyer Snr headed the family business following the retirement of his father, Edward. Employed beneath him were his two sons, James and Frederick Hellyer, and later his Grandson, James Edward Hellyer Jnr.

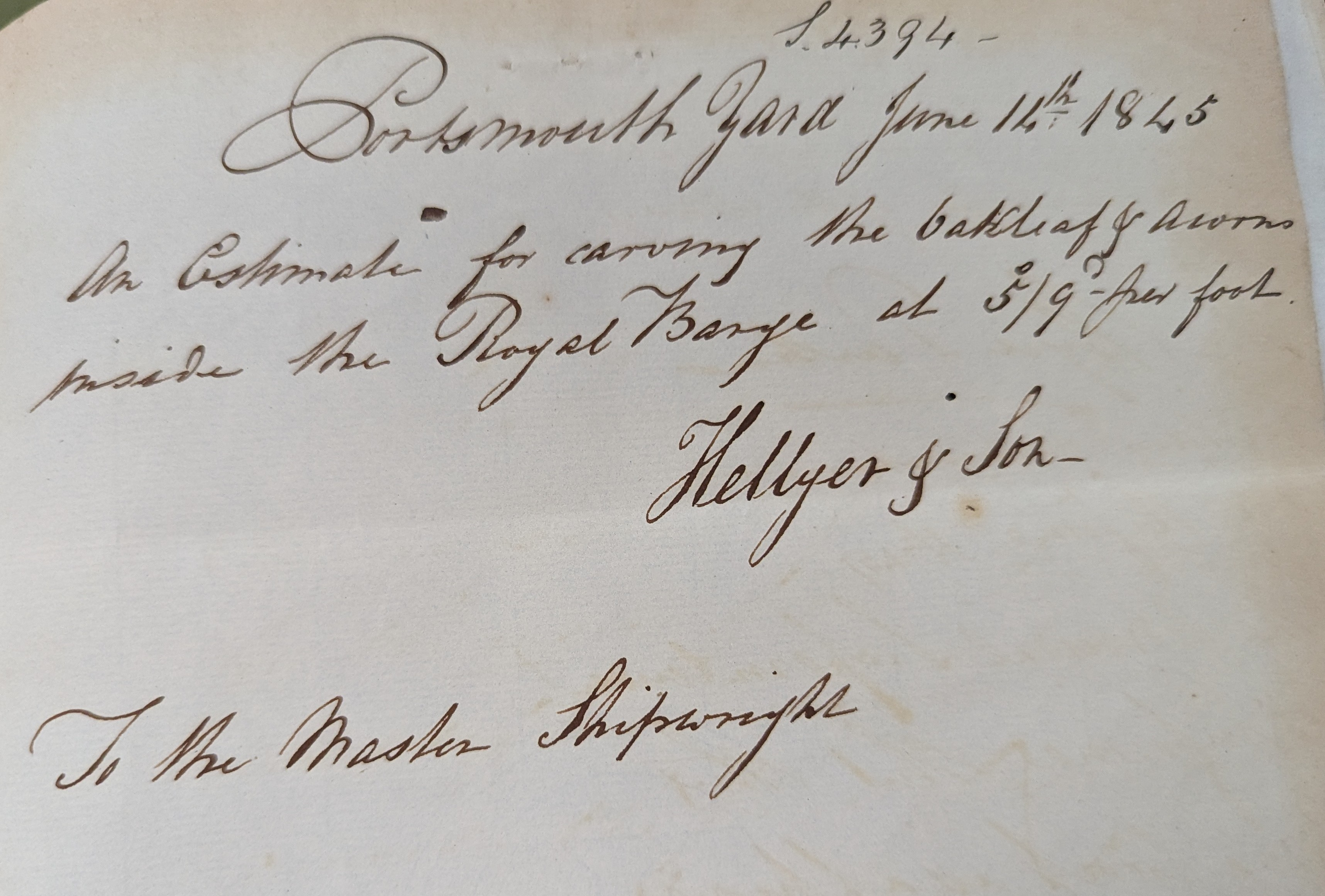
Estimate of the cost of carved works for the Royal Barge by Hellyer & Sons, 14th June 1845 (TNA – ADM 87/15)

James Edward Hellyer also held the position of Master Carver at Portsmouth Dockyard.

He is also believed to have carved a statue of George III that originally stood in Jubilee Terrace, Portsmouth. Figurehead commissions were not always guaranteed, so it was not uncommon for the Hellyers to work on other projects or indeed other ships carvings.

He is also linked to an Isaac Hellyer of Weymouth; working as a statuary and stonemason.

James Edward Hellyer is known to have designed and carved figureheads for the following vessels:

Vessel	Year	Designed	Carved	Notes
HMS Trafalgar	1841	Yes	Yes	Submitted in competition with the Dickerson family of Devonport.
HMS Calypso	1843	Yes	Yes	The design for HMS Calypso was approved in 1843 at £8.18.0 (approx. £862.38 today). The figurehead can be seen as part of the collection at the National Museum of the Royal Navy, Portsmouth.
HMS Grampus Design of HMS Grampus figurehead by Hellyer & Sons, 1845, (TNA – ADM 87/15)	1845	Yes	Yes	Hellyer & Son's design for HMS Grampus was not the ship's first figurehead. It depicted the Roman divine hero, Hercules, to suit the ship's original name, HMS Tremendous. Later that year, however, the name was deemed unsuitable and was changed to Grampus – a member of the dolphin family. The Hellyers were then instructed to design a new figurehead, which resides in the collection of the National Museum of the Royal Navy, Portsmouth.
HMS Elfin	1848/9	Yes	Yes	Hellyer & Son submitted two designs for HMS Elfin. The first – for a full-length figure – was accepted in 1848 at an estimate of £20 (approx. £2,019.80 today). The second submitted in the following year was for 'a neat busthead' and accepted at an estimate of £5 (approx. £538.99 today). The figurehead of HMS Elfin can be seen within the collection of the National Museum of the Royal Navy, Portsmouth.
HMS Vernon	1849	Yes	Yes	Hellyer & Son carved the second figurehead fitted to the ship after the first decayed. This figurehead was based on a second design after Hellyer's first was rejected in favour of one looking like Lord Vernon.
HMS Marlborough	1854	Yes	Yes	Carved by J.E. Hellyer in his Blackwall workshop and approved at a cost of £50 (approx. £4,702.95 today).
HMS Ariadne	1859	Yes	Yes	Designed and carved by Hellyer & Son in response to a Deptford Yard request for a figurehead to be provided. The carver's estimate for the work stood at £24.10.0 (approx. £2,559 today).

== James Hellyer ==
Joining the family business underneath his father, James Hellyer Snr, James is presumed to have run the London side of the firm with his brother, Frederick, with both recorded has living in Essex.

Their close proximity to London enabled them to establish a second workshop in Blackwall, increasing their chances of securing more contracts owed largely to the fact that their London presence kept costs down for the Admiralty who did not have to factor in the cost of transporting a figurehead from further afield to its ship in the capital.

There are no records suggesting when James ceased working in London, but he is recorded in the 1871 Census as living and working in Hampshire.

== Frederick Hellyer and son, James Edward Hellyer Jnr ==
Frederick is believed to have continued with the London side of the business until his retirement with records showing he died in Lewisham in 1906.

It is uncertain how long his son, James Edward Jnr, worked for the family firm. The details of his occupation given in both the 1901 and 1911 Census Returns are ambiguous and suggest he may already have been working on his own by this stage.

== The Great Exhibition ==
In 1851, Hellyer & Sons exhibited a group of 17 figureheads on a pedestal at The Great Exhibition of the Works of the Industry of All Nations in Hyde Park. Attended by numerous prominent and famous people such as Charles Darwin, Samuel Colt, and Charlotte Brontë, it was an invaluable opportunity to showcase their craftsmanship and business acumen.

== Naval Figureheads ==
Other figureheads designed and carved by the Hellyers include:

Vessel	Year	Designed	Carved	Notes
HMS Malacca	1844	Yes	Unknown	In 1844, Hellyer & Son submitted a request to design figureheads for ships being built at several of the British Empire owned dockyards. Their request was approved, and they submitted a design for HMS Malacca alongside several others. The design was approved with an estimate of £9.0.0 (approx. £970 today) but it is unknown whether the Hellyer figurehead ever reached Moulmein, Burma (modern day Mawlamyine, Myanmar) where the ship was ordered. The carving that resides within the collection of the National Museum of the Royal Navy, Portsmouth is not the Hellyer figurehead.
HMS Hibernia	1845	Yes	Yes	Hellyer & Son submitted the design for HMS Hibernia's replacement figurehead, the original most likely carved by resident carvers at Devonport. The carvers were allowed £47 for the work (approx £4,848.59 today).
HMS Cruizer	1851	Yes	Yes	Hellyer & Son submitted two figureheads; a larger Demi-Head and a cheaper Bust Head for three pounds cheaper than the first at £6.10.0. The Survey of the Navy chose the cheaper option (approx. £710.67 today). The figurehead of HMS Cruizer can be seen within the collection at the National Museum of the Royal Navy, Portsmouth.
HMS Royal Albert	1853	Yes	Yes	Designed and carved by Hellyer & Son at their Blackwall workshop with an original estimate of £150 (approx. £16,169 today) reduced to £100 (approx. £10,779 today) after the royal arms intended for the trailboards were declared 'not required' by the Surveyor of the Navy.
HMS Orestes	1860	Yes	Yes	J.E. & J. Hellyer submitted the design for the 1860 HMS Orestes that replaced the original from 1824. The original is also believed to have been created by either Edward or his son J.E. Hellyer, though no records survive that identify the carver.
HMS Royal Frederick	1860	Yes	Yes	Designed as both a standing figure and a bust. £40 was allowed for the work (approx. £4,126.36 today).
HMS St Vincent	1906	Yes	Yes	Replacement figurehead for the original carved by the Dickerson family of Devonport.

== Competition ==
Competition among carvers was often encouraged by the Surveyor of the Navy as it helped to keep overall costs down. For several decades, the Hellyers competed with the Dickersons of Devonport; the family's biggest rivals. It became commonplace for the Hellyers and the Dickersons to compete for the same figurehead commissions.

On several occasions, original Dickerson figureheads – perhaps damaged or decayed – were replaced by new Hellyer designs. And with a London firm they often found themselves in favour for contracts, with the dual locations often assisting in cutting transportation costs of figureheads to their intended ships.

The Hellyers were also willing to compete globally for commissions; in the summer of 1844, when work was scarce, the company wrote to the Surveyor of the Navy to request the placing of an order for the carved work of for the ships being built at Bombay Dockyard. Successful in their request, the Hellyers were granted permission to submit designs for HM Ships Madras, Malacca, Zebra and Goshawk – 'observing that they are to be made characteristic of the country in which they are building.'
