= Acrostolium =

Decorative feature on early Greek and Roman ships

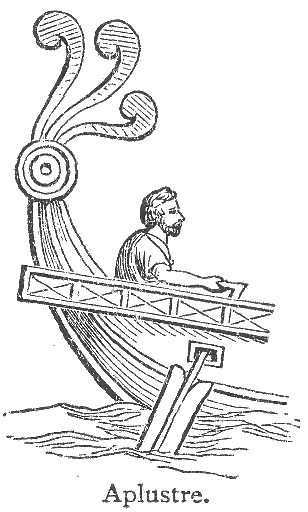

An acrostolium (from Gk: akrostolion, ἀκροστόλιον, meaning "high dressing"; also called an aphlaston; ἄφλαστον) or aplustre are the Latin terms that have entered English for a decorative feature found on the sterns of ancient Roman, Greek and other nations' galleys, often as a fan- or tail-like flourish in the upward-curving extension of the ship's rear.

It is described in The Oxford Companion to Ships and the Sea as "the symbolical ornament, usually in the form of a shield or helmet, which ancient Greek or Roman ships carried on their prows either to seek favour with the sea gods or to ward off evil. It was the forerunner of the figurehead with which more modern ships were, and some still are, decorated", though other sources and dictionaries define it as at the stern.

Versions of acrostolia were also featured in rostral columns marking notable seaborne events.
