= HMS Malacca (1853) =

Sloop of the Royal Navy

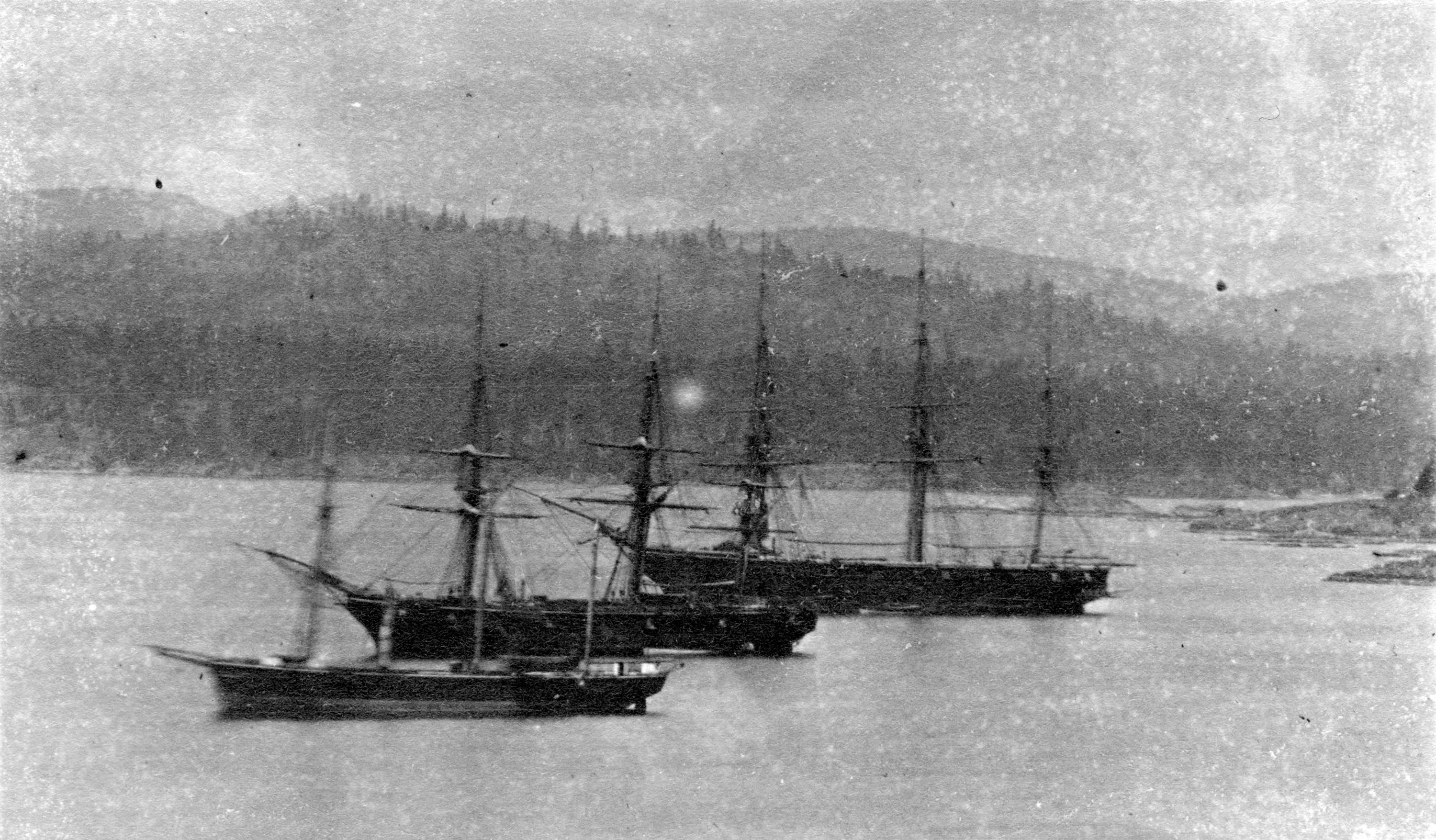
- HM ships Grappler, Shearwater and Malacca (far right) at Esquimalt, Vancouver's Island

History

United Kingdom
- Name: HMS Malacca
- Ordered: 9 November 1847
- Builder: Moulmein, Burma
- Laid down: 29 May 1849
- Launched: 9 April 1853
- Completed: 17 August 1854
- Commissioned: 19 June 1854
- Decommissioned: 9 September 1869
- Fate: Sold in June 1869, then resold to Japan 1870

Japan
- Name: Tsukuba
- Acquired: 1870
- Commissioned: 1870
- Decommissioned: 1906
- Reclassified: Static training vessel c. 1900
- Honours and awards: Baltic 1854, Black Sea 1854–55
- Fate: Broken up in 1906

General characteristics in British service
- Class & type: sloop; Corvette reclassified in 1862
- Tons burthen: 1,034 28/94 bm
- Length: 192 ft 0 in (58.52 m) gundeck; 168 ft 2.5 in (51.270 m) keel reported for tonnage
- Beam: 34 ft 4 in (10.46 m) maximum, 34 ft 0 in (10.36 m) reported for tonnage
- Draught: 15 ft 10 in (4.83 m) forward and 18 ft 10 in (5.74 m) aft
- Depth of hold: 22 ft 8 in (6.91 m)
- Installed power: 200 nhp/692 ihp (516 kW); After 1862: 707 ihp (527 kW)
- Propulsion: As built; John Penn & Son 2-cylinder (283/8in diameter, 2½ft stroke) inclined single expansion, trunk, high pressure engine; Single screw; After 1862; Humphrys & Tennant 2-cylinder (42¼in diameter, 26in stroke) horizontal single expansion engine
- Speed: (Under steam); As built: 9.2 kn (10.6 mph); After 1862: 9.5 kn (10.9 mph)
- Complement: 180
- Armament: 1 × 10-inch 85 cwt shell gun; 18 × 32-pounder 32 cwt MLSB guns or; 1 × 8 in 65 cwt shell gun; 16 × 32-pdr 32 cwt MLSB guns

General characteristics in Japanese service
- Armament: 6 × 4.5-inch BL guns; 2 × 30-pounder guns; 2 × 24-pounder guns; 4 × 6-inch QF guns (after 1892)

HMS Malacca was a 17-gun wooden sloop of the Royal Navy. She was ordered on 9 November 1847 from Moulmein, Burma to be built of teak. As a Surveyor's Department design, Malacca was based on the Conflict designed sloop which was approved on 9 December 1848. After launching in April 1853 she was commissioned the following month to be sailed to England for the fitting of her engine. She entered British Naval service in 1854 and served three commissions including action in the Russian War 1854–55 before being sold in 1869. Her resale to Japan, she served in the Japanese Navy as a training ship until broken in 1906.

Malacca was the second name vessel since it was used for a 36-gun fifth rate launched at Prince of Wales I, Penang in 1809 and broken in March 1816.

== Construction and specifications ==
Malacca’s keel was laid in January 1849 at Moulmein, Burma and launched on 2 June 1851. Her gundeck was 192 ft 0 in (58.52 m) with her keel length reported for tonnage calculation of 168 ft 2.5 in (51.270 m). Her maximum breadth was 34 ft 4 in (10.46 m) and reported for tonnage was 34 ft 0 in (10.36 m). She had a depth of hold of 22 ft 8 in (6.91 m). Her builder’s measure tonnage was 1,034 tons. Her draught forward was 15 ft 10 in (4.83 m) Nd 18 ft 10 in (5.74 m) aft. During the construction of the hull, Mr Mould died and his estate was declared bankrupt. The government Inspector General, Mr Ladd took over the construction. After the launch, she was prepped for sea as a sailing vessel, loaded with enough teak to construct another similar vessel then departed for England under the command of Lieutenant John A.P. Price, RN on 16 May 1853. Upon her arrival at Chatham she was paid off on 28 September 1853.

Starting on 31 January 1854 to her undocking on 8 August, she had her machinery installed. Her initial machinery was supplied by John Penn & Sons. She shipped two fire-tube rectangular boilers. Initially she was equipped with a two cylinder inclined single expansion trunk (ISET) steam engine with cylinders of 28.5 in (720 mm) in diameter with a 30 in (760 mm) stroke, rated at 200 nominal horsepower to drive a single screw. She was re-engined in 1862 and was equipped with a Humphry's & Tennant 2-cylinder horizontal single expansion (HSE) steam engine with cylinders of 42.25 in (1,073 mm) in diameter with a 26 in (660 mm) stroke. She carried three mast and a full rig sail plan.

Her initial armament for a 17-gun fit consisted of one 8-inch 65 hundredweight (cwt) muzzle-loading shell gun on a pivot mount forward with sixteen 32-pounder 32 cwt muzzle-loading smooth bore (MLSB) guns on broadside trucks.

=== Figurehead ===
The original design for the figurehead of Malacca depicted a turbaned male bust with moustache and striped shirt. It was submitted to the Surveyor of the Navy in London by Hellyer & Sons in 1844, after lack of work had forced the company to appeal to the Surveyor to accept several drawings for work that would otherwise have been completed in Bombay Dockyard (modern day Mumbai), India. The design, which is held within the National Archives Admiralty papers, was approved but the carving which resides in the collection of the National Museum of the Royal Navy, Portsmouth, does not match the Hellyer design.

== Commissioned service ==
=== First commission ===
She was commissioned on 19 June 1854 under the command of Captain Arthur Farquhar, RN for Particular Service during the Russian War 1854–55. She first sailed for the Baltic, joining Sir Robert Napier's Fleet. She returned with the Fleet in September prior to the Winter freeze up of the Baltic. Upon her return she sailed for the Black Sea to join British Forces there. Upon the cessation of Hostilities she was sent to the North America and West Indies Station in November 1855. By January 1857 she had been reassigned to the Mediterranean. In January 1857, she rescued the survivors from the Royal Sicilian Navy ship Carlo III, which suffered a boiler explosion and sank in the Mediterranean Sea with the loss of more than half of her 100 crew. She returned to Home Waters, paying off at Sheerness on 16 June 1857.

=== Second commission ===
She was commissioned at Sheerness on 3 September 1861 under the command of Captain Gerard J. Napier, RN for service in the Mediterranean. Most references stated that during this commission she was re-engined. Though plausible it is believed that she was either re-engined before this commission or following it (author's observation). During this commission she was reclassified as a corvette in 1862. On 14 October 1863, she ran aground at Fort St. Angelo, Malta but was not damaged. A Court of Enquiry found that her captain and her master had made an error of judgement. She paid off at Portsmouth on 8 December 1863.

=== Third commission ===
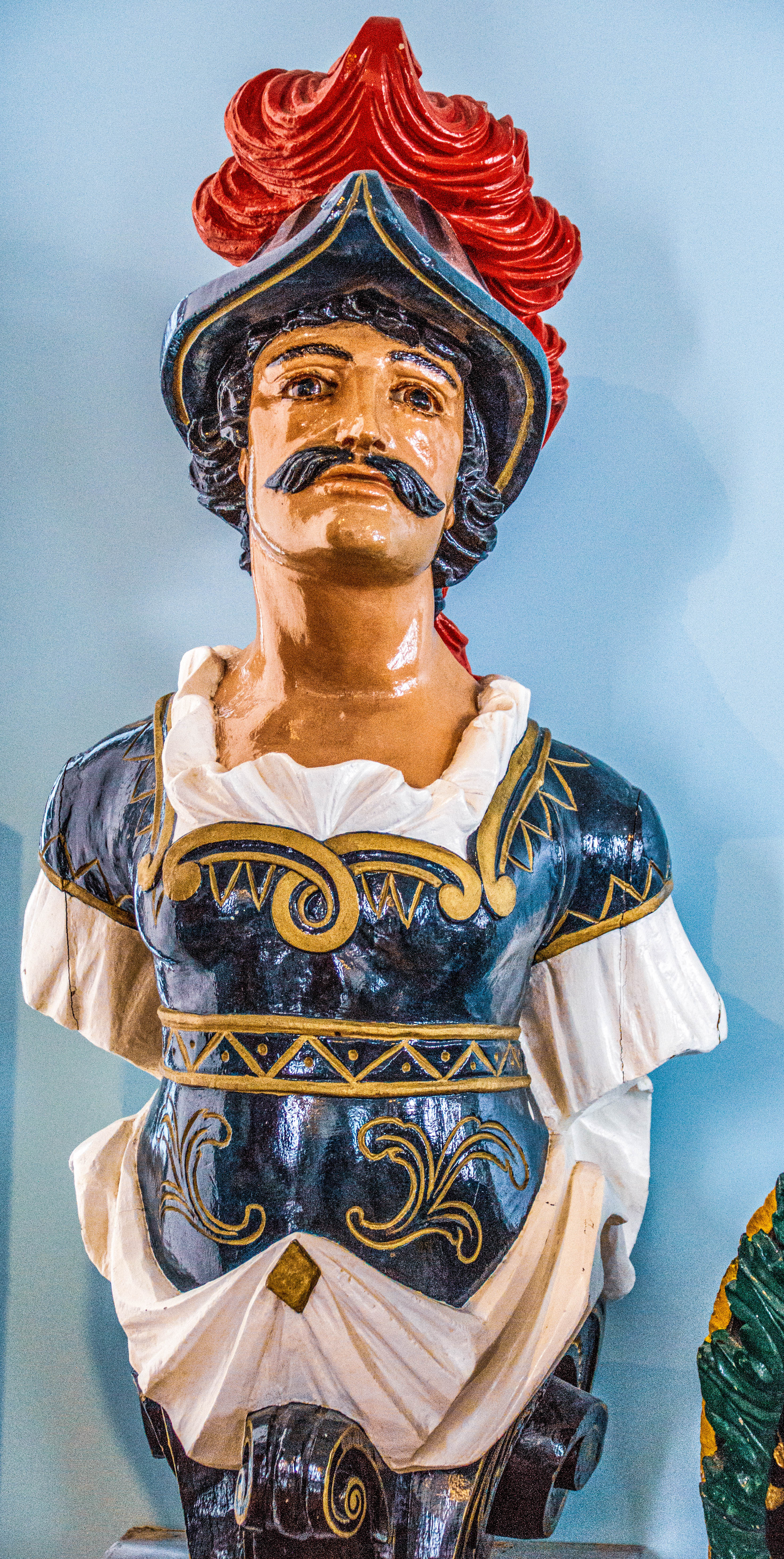
Figurehead of the Malacca

Her last commission was on 10 November 1865 under the command of Captain Radulphus B. Oldfield, RN for service on the Pacific Station. On 16 September 1867, she ran aground in the Lorenzo Channel. Repairs cost £1,371. An officer was found to have been negligent. She returned to Home Waters paying off on 9 September 1869.

== Disposition ==
She was sold in June 1869 to E. Bates. Bates sold her later that year to the Imperial Japanese Navy, who took her into service as the Tsukuba. She served as a stationary training ship after about 1900, and was broken up in 1906.
