= 45 Quay Street =

Historic building in Scarborough, England

Coordinates: 54°17′04″N 0°23′19″W

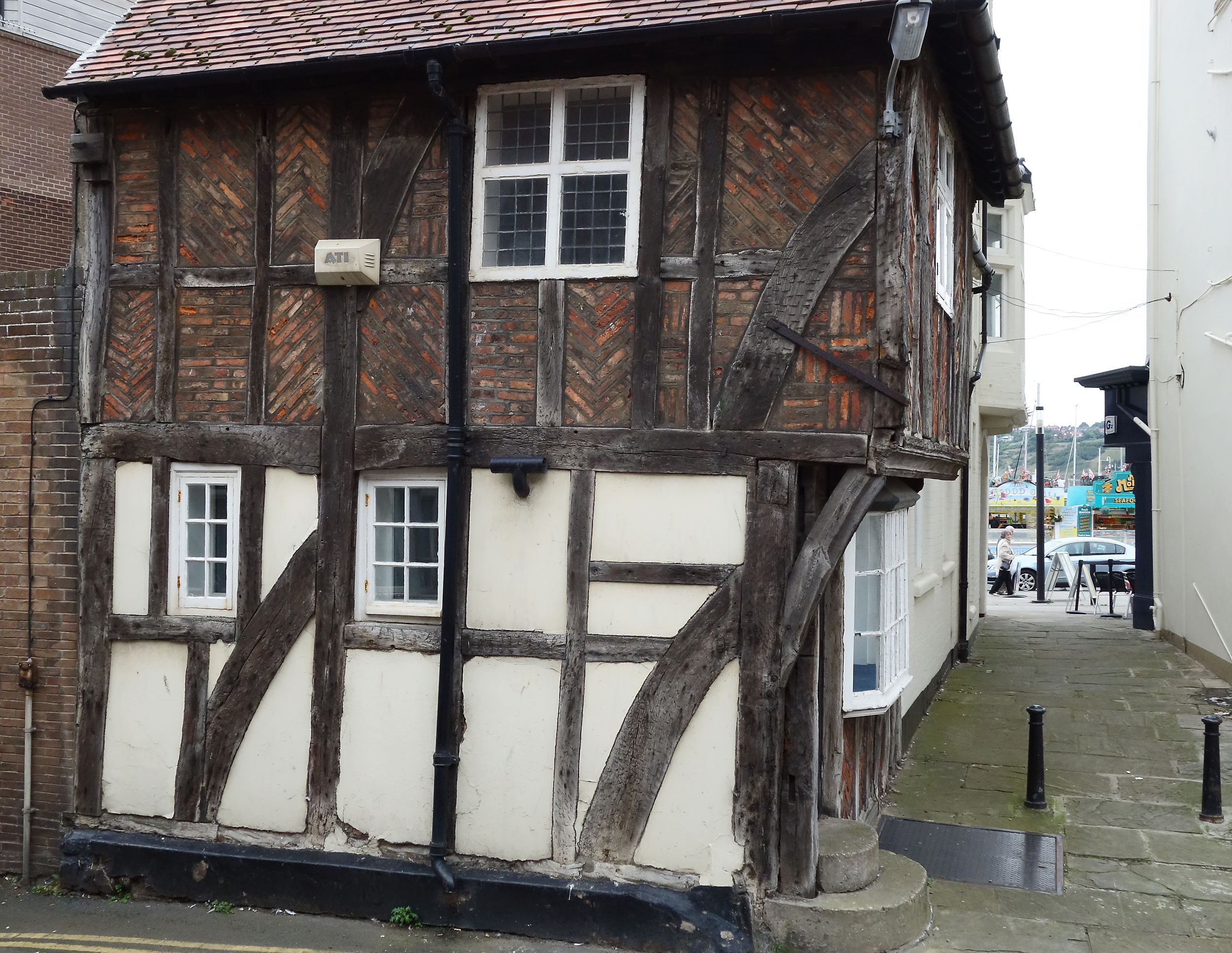
The building, in 2015

45 Quay Street is a historic building in Scarborough, North Yorkshire, a town in England.

Quay Street was probably laid out in the 13th century, to provide access to the town's new harbour. 45 Quay Street was probably constructed around 1500 as part of a much larger building, which may have included what is now the Three Mariners. It was converted into the Dog and Duck public house at an early date. The building was restored in the early 20th century, and much of the infill was replaced with herringbone brick. It has now been incorporated into the neighbouring New Lancaster pub. The building was grade II* listed in 1953.

The building is timber framed, with brick and some plaster infill and a tile roof. It has two storeys, the upper storey on the west front jettied, with a moulded bressumer and a corner bracket. On the ground floor is a doorway and a canted bay window, and the windows elsewhere are casements.

== See also ==
- Grade II* listed buildings in North Yorkshire (district)
- Listed buildings in Scarborough (Castle Ward)
