= HMS Minerva (1820) =

Fifth-rate frigate

HMS Minerva was a fifth rate frigate and modified Leda class of 46 guns, launched at Portsmouth Dockyard on 13 June 1820.

== Career ==
The ship was placed in Ordinary (reserve) on completion and was never commissioned. In 1859 she became a floating workshop and was hulked for harbour service in 1861.

== Breaking up ==
Minerva was sold out of naval service in 1895 and was broken up.

== Figurehead ==
This figurehead was carved in 1819 by Edward Hellyer of Hellyer & Sons, a Portsmouth and London based family business of prominent carvers.

It can now be seen as part of the collection of figureheads at the National Museum of the Royal Navy, Portsmouth.
