= HMS Elfin (1933) =

1933 torpedo recovery vessel

Coordinates: 52°29.1873′N 4°48.4896′E

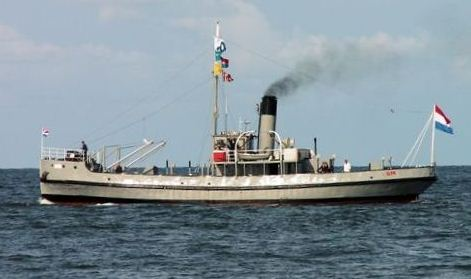
- ELFIN, ex HMS ELFIN steaming on the North Sea near IJmuiden, 2007.

History

United Kingdom
- Name: 1933–1941: Elfin; 1941–1958: Nettle
- Ordered: 12 May 1933
- Builder: J. Samuel White & Company
- Yard number: 1754
- Laid down: June 1933
- Launched: 20 November 1933
- Commissioned: 16 January 1934
- Decommissioned: 1957
- Renamed: HMS Nettle on 20 August 1941
- Identification: Pennant number: T25, T94

History

Netherlands
- Name: 1958–1995: Droogdok 18,HOM7, later TCA1; 1995-to-date: Elfin
- Owner: 1958–1995: Amsterdamsche Droogdok Maatschappij, Amsterdam; 1995-to-date: Stichting tot Behoud van het Stoomschip, Koog aan de Zaan
- Identification: MMSI number: 244730173; Callsign: PB9183
- Status: Preserved in the Netherlands

General characteristics
- Class & type: submarine tender, torpedo recovery vessel
- Displacement: 222t
- Length: 108 ft 3.21 in (33.0 m)
- Beam: 25 ft 7.08 in (7.8 m)
- Draught: 7 ft 10.48 in (2.4 m)
- Installed power: 250 IHP
- Propulsion: 2 sets of reciprocating compound steam engines; 1 cylindrical Scotch boiler
- Speed: 9.5 knots (17.6 km/h; 10.9 mph)
- Complement: 12
- Armament: 1942-1945: 1 × 20 mm Oerlikon gun
- Notes: Torpedo load: 12x Mark VIII; 1934–1939 tender to HMS Titania; 1940–1945 tender to HMS Cyclops

HMS Elfin (pennant number T25) was a torpedo recovery vessel built for the Royal Navy. She was built by J. Samuel White & Company, East Cowes, Isle of Wight, was launched on 20 November 1933 and commissioned on 16 January 1934. She was builder's number 1754. Her home port was the Navy's torpedo trials establishment HMS Vernon, and she was based at Portland. A sistership, Redwing, was constructed under builder's number 1753 and was stationed at HMS Defiance, Devonport. Elfin was renamed Nettle during the Second World War, and was later sold for scrapping. She survived in mercantile service, and has been preserved.

== Wartime service ==
Elfin operated during the Second World War. In 1940 she was transferred to Blyth to become the depot ship for the 6th Submarine Flotilla, sharing her name with the submarine base there. She was replaced by the drifter Rotha in 1941 and transferred to the Clyde, being renamed HMS Nettle on 20 August 1941 and assigned pennant number T94.

== Post war service ==
After the war Nettle returned to Portland. By then the tender was operated by a civilian crew. Nettle was finally sold in 1957 to Pounds, Portsmouth for scrapping, but was sold a year later to the Amsterdam Dry-dock Company (ADM). While at Pounds's yard, she appeared in the film The Key.

== Mercantile service and preservation ==
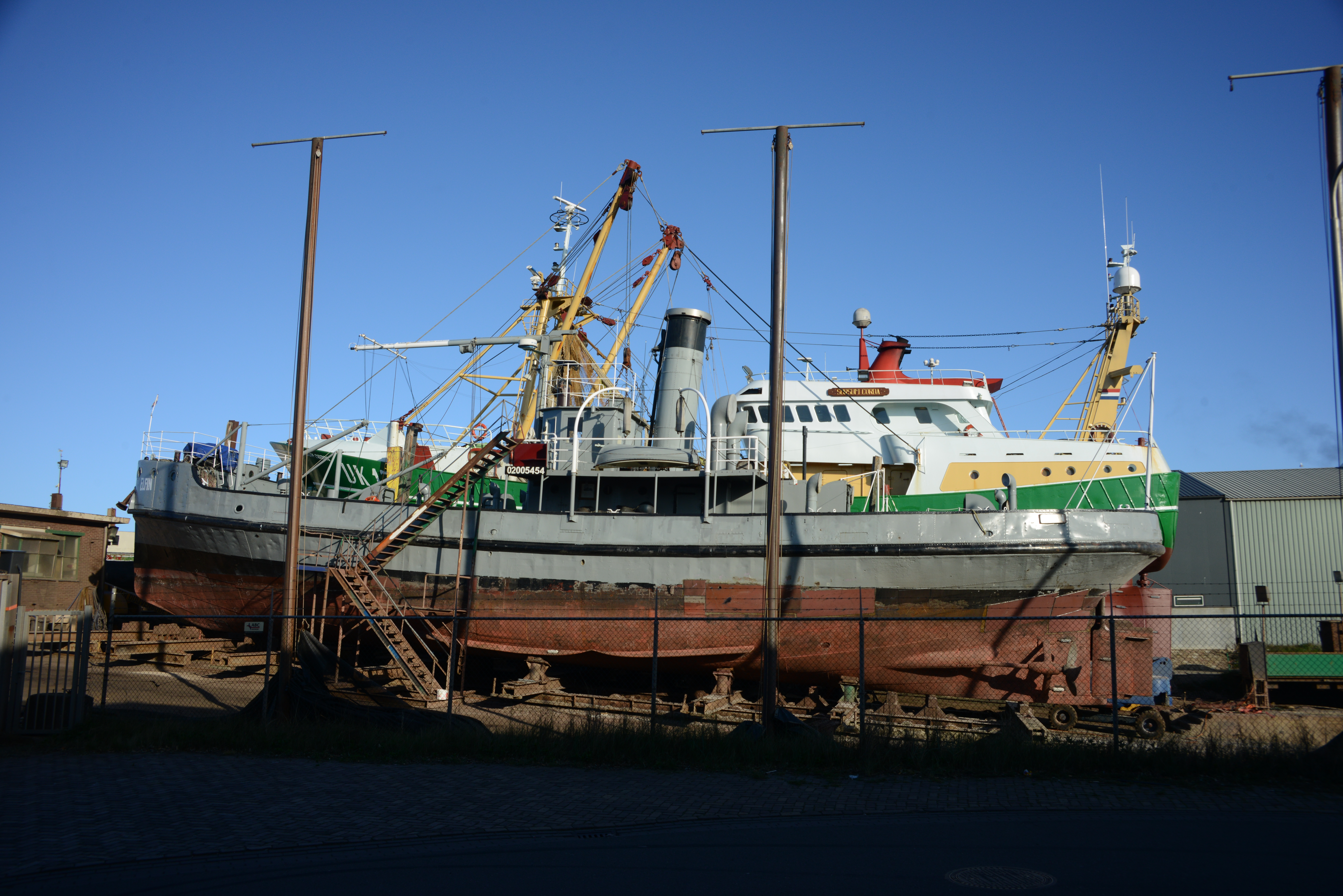
Elfin on the slipway in IJmuiden, April 2026

Converted to a tanker cleaning vessel, she continued in service for the ADM in Amsterdam harbour until 1985 as Droogdok 18, HOM7 and TCA1. She was transferred to a preservation society in 1995. The ship has been renamed Elfin, restored and preserved in Wormerveer, the Netherlands. In 2011 she was used in the Dutch film Bennie Stout.
