= HMS Redwing (1933) =

History

United Kingdom
- Name: 1933–1941: Redwing
- Ordered: 12 May 1933
- Builder: J. Samuel White & Company
- Yard number: 1753
- Laid down: June 1933
- Launched: 19 October 1933
- Commissioned: 1934
- Decommissioned: unknown
- Identification: Pennant number: T36,

General characteristics
- Class & type: submarine tender, torpedo recovery vessel
- Displacement: 225t
- Length: 112 ft 3.21 in (34.2 m)
- Beam: 25 ft 7.08 in (7.8 m)
- Draught: 7 ft 10.48 in (2.4 m)
- Installed power: 250 IHP
- Propulsion: 2 sets of reciprocating compound steam engines; 1 cylindrical Scotch boiler
- Speed: 9.5 knots (17.6 km/h; 10.9 mph)
- Complement: 12
- Notes: Torpedo load: 8x Mark VIII; tender to HMS Defiance

HMS Redwing (pennant number T36) was a torpedo recovery vessel built for the Royal Navy. She was built by J. Samuel White & Company, East Cowes, Isle of Wight and was launched on 29 October 1933. She was builder's number 1753. She was the sister ship of HMS Elfin, yard nr 1754. She was a tender to the torpedo school HMS Defiance in Devonport.
