= Dickerson family =

British figurehead carvers

The Dickersons were a prominent family of carvers based in Plymouth, Devon, active throughout the eighteenth and nineteenth centuries.

== Overview ==
Contracted to Plymouth Dock from as early as 1770, the Dickersons carved many figureheads and other ships' decoration for Royal Naval vessels over three generations.

== Samuel Dickerson ==
In 1770, Samuel Dickerson was granted the warrant for the role of Master Carver at Plymouth Dock, succeeding Thomas Pierce in the role.

Two years later, he cut a new figurehead for the HMS Foudroyant as part of a large repair at Plymouth. It was described to the Naval Board as "far superior in magnitude than any done before as a single figure, except that of the London."

One of his most prestigious figureheads was the HMS Royal Sovereign, carved in 1786. Dickerson was likely in charge of a team of carvers responsible for working on the figurehead. A reproduction of Dickerson's design is featured in Henry Francis Whitfield's Plymouth and Devonport: in times of war and peace (1900).

By 1791, Samuel had retired, the role passing to his son, James.

== James Dickerson ==
James Dickerson – most likely apprenticed as a carver to his father – began working alongside Samuel in the late 1780s. He is listed as Master Carver in the Plymouth Dock/Stoke Damerel sections of the 1791 Universal Directory of Great Britain.

James Dickerson is known to have worked as Plymouth's Master Carver until at least 1839, with the title appearing as his occupation on the marriage record of his son Frederick to Lavinia Goldsworthy in 1839.

Among others, James is known to have carved figureheads for the following naval ships:

Vessel	Year	Designed	Carved	Notes
HMS Caesar	1793	Yes	Yes	
HM Yacht Plymouth	1796	Yes	Yes	
L'Hercule	1798	Yes	Yes	Captured French naval ship, which became HMS Hercule. James carved the new Royal Naval figurehead.
HMS Hibernia	1804	Unknown	Unknown	Ship built at Plymouth, figurehead likely made by 'resident carvers of Plymouth' which would have included James.
HMS Rolla	1807	Yes	Yes	James estimate cost of £3.0.0 (approx. £278.59 today) was approved.
HMS St Vincent	1815	Yes	Yes	Carved the original figurehead for St. Vincent, which was then replaced by a Hellyer design in 1851 after showing signs of decay. The figurehead for HMS St. Vincent – carved by James Edward Hellyer – is held by the National Museum of the Royal Navy, Portsmouth.
HMS Royal William a.k.a "King Billy"	1833	Yes	Yes	Carved alongside his son, Frederick. The figurehead for HMS Royal William, on loan from the National Museum of the Royal Navy, can be seen on display at The Box, Plymouth.
HMS Nile	1839	Yes	Yes	Original figurehead designed and carved by James. Replacement designed and carved by his son, Frederick, in 1851.

== Frederick Dickerson ==
Frederick Dickerson was the last member of the Dickerson family to carve in Plymouth Dock. Beginning his career in the yard in the early 1800s, he worked for several years alongside his father, and described himself as an 'artist naval carver' in the 1851 census. Ten years later, Dickerson described himself as 'master carver', and featured in the 1871 census as 'retired master carver.'

During his time as a carver, Dickerson carved some of the last full-length figures to be fitted to the navy's First-rates; HMS Royal William (1833) and HMS Saint George (1840). He then carved their replacements in the form of large busts when the ships were cut down to enable the fitting of steam propulsion in the late 1850s.

Among many others, Frederick is known to have submitted designs, and carved many figureheads, for the following vessels:

Vessel	Year	Designed	Carved	Notes
HMS Minden	1810	Yes	Unknown	
HMS Royal George	1827	Yes	Unknown	
HMR Royal William a.k.a. "King Billy"	1833	No	Yes	Carved alongside his father, James. Carved new, smaller bust when ship refitted for steam propulsion. The figurehead for HMS Royal William, on loan from the National Museum of the Royal Navy, can be seen on display at The Box, Plymouth.
HMS St George	1840	Yes	Yes	Designed and carved original full-length figure, then replaced with smaller bust when ship refitted for steam propulsion.
HMS Constance	1844	Yes	Yes	Frederick Dickerson estimated the cost at £15 (approx. £1612.06). A dispute about its size led to the Surveyor of the Royal Navy seeking an alternative from Messrs Hellyer & Son. The figurehead that survives is carved by Dickerson.
HMS Nile	1851	Yes	Yes	Replaced the original designed and carved by father, James.
HMS Flying Fish	1855	Yes	Unknown	
HMS Alert	1856	Yes	Unknown	
HMS Greyhound	1856	Yes	Unknown	
HMS Topaze	1856	Yes	Yes	Work cost £28 10s, approximately £2,551 today. The figurehead for HMS Topaze, on loan from the National Museum of the Royal Navy, can be seen on display at The Box, Plymouth.
HMS Orlando	1856	Yes	Unknown	
HMS Gannet	1857	Yes	Yes	The figurehead is part of the collection at the National Maritime Museum, London.
HMS Peterel	1860	Yes	Yes	Owned by the Portsmouth Royal Dockyard Historical Trust.
HMS Liverpool	1860	Yes	Unknown	
HMS Perseus	1861	Yes	Unknown	
HMS Albion	1861	Yes	Unknown	
HM Yacht, Alberta	1863	Yes	Yes	The decoration for HM Yacht Alberta is held within the collection of the National Museum of the Royal Navy, Portsmouth. The carving resembles earlier bow decorations rather than a person-inspired figurehead.
HMS Zealous	1864	Yes	Unknown	

== The Dickerson Archive ==
Records held at The National Archives suggest it was not uncommon for carvers to retain approved designs to ensure they were closely followed during the carving process. When both full-length and bust alternatives were offered the rejected design was usually filed along with the associated correspondence, but the approved is often missing. Each carver of the Dickerson family followed this practice, resulting in a large collection of carvers' drawings – known as the 'Dickerson Archive' – being held by private hands in Australia.

When Frederick Dickerson retired the designs that he had kept eventually passed to his daughter, Lavinia, who was married to a Lewis John Sydenham. The papers were then passed to one of their sons, a naval engineer who retired as a rear admiral to New Zealand, taking the papers with him. They finally passed to the admiral's nephew, who emigrated from Devon to Australia and then to his son, who eventually entrusted the care of the archive to the National Maritime Museum in Greenwich, London.

Consisting of around 130 sheets of cartridge paper of various sizes, eighty of them contain design drawings of figureheads of named warships. The remainder consist of studies for further development, stern carving detail and associated artwork.

Some drawings predate the Dickersons and were perhaps inherited from a previous carver. Most are created for ships built at Plymouth, though some were intended for Pembroke Dockyard. It was not uncommon for carvers to design figureheads for ships built elsewhere, and they often competed with other carvers to secure the contract.

== Competition ==
The Hellyers, described as 'a firm of carvers and guilders specialising in ship's carvings,' were another prominent carving family, based in Portsmouth and operating under the name Hellyer & Sons from 1851 to 1901. The Hellyers were the Dickersons' biggest competition from the inception of their business and became the forerunners Frederick Dickerson's retirement in the 1860s.

The Surveyor of the Navy encouraged such competition between carvers in an attempt to keep costs down. This can be seen most clearly in ship buildings at Pembroke Yard; it might be thought Plymouth would receive the larger share of work, with transportation costs between the two yards being lower. However, from 1840 to 1860 – when records are most complete – the Dickersons offered designs for thirty-three figureheads, whilst the Hellyers offered designs for forty, taking advantage of the better communications between Portsmouth, Rotherhithe and London.
