= Figurehead (object) =

Decoration at prow of ship

Figurehead on a model of the French ship Océan

A figurehead is a carved wooden decoration found at the bow of ships, generally of a design related to the name or role of a ship. They were predominant between the sixteenth and twentieth centuries, and modern ships' badges fulfil a similar role.

== History ==
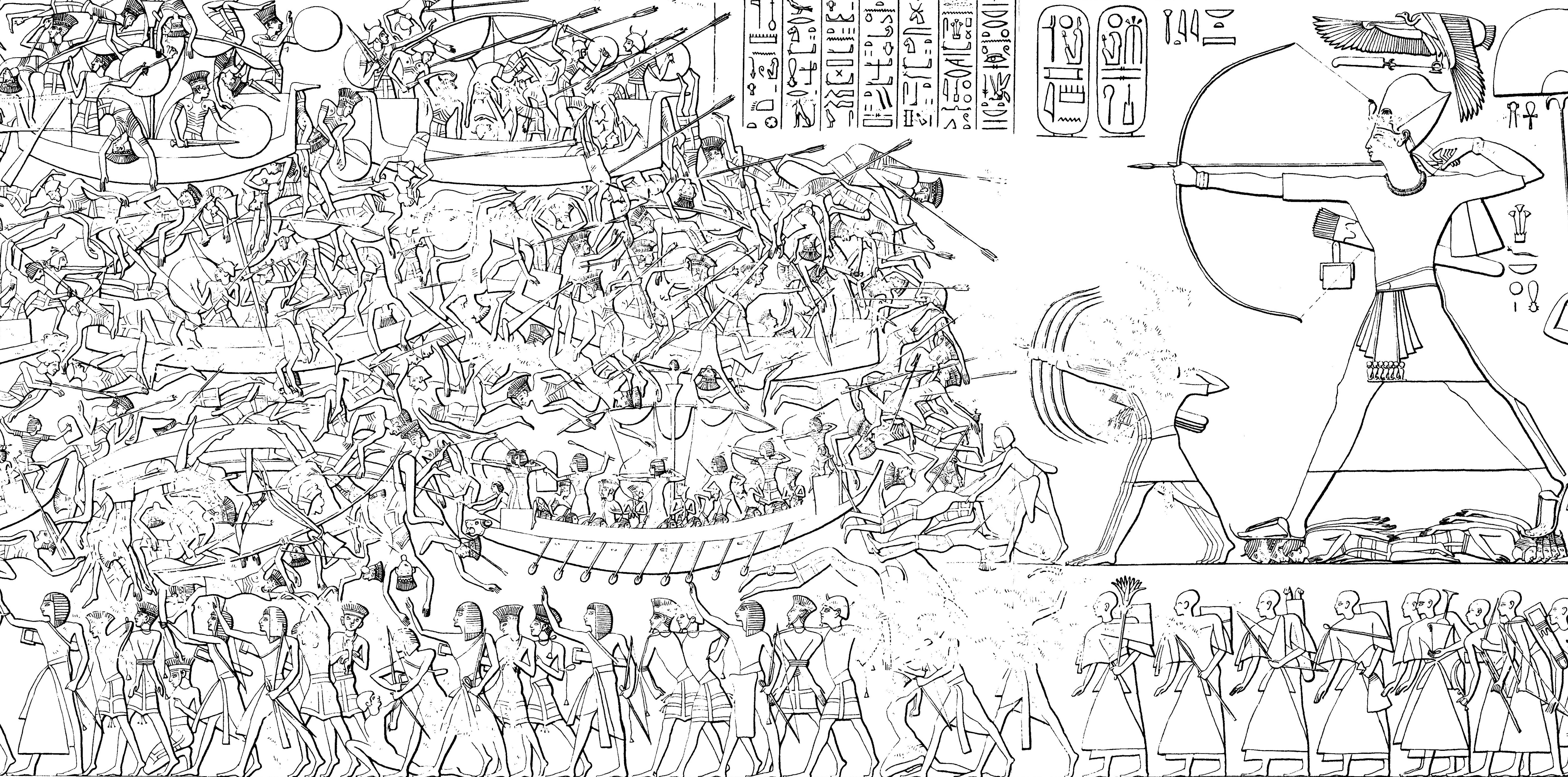
A ship with oars bears the fierce lioness that appears as a figurehead on two Ancient Egyptian ships in a c. 1200 BC depiction of the victory over the invading Sea Peoples in a battle at the Nile River Delta.

Early ships often had some form of bow ornamentation (e.g. the eyes painted on the bows of Greek and Phoenician galleys, the Roman practice of putting carvings of their deities on the bows of their galleys, and the Viking ships of ca. A.D. 800–1100). The menacing appearance of toothy and bug-eyed figureheads on Viking ships were considered a form of apotropaic magic, serving the function of warding off evil spirits.

The Ancient Egyptians placed figures of holy birds on the prow. A wall relief at Medinet Habu depicting Ramses III defeating the Sea Peoples in the Battle of the Nile Delta circa 1200 BC depicts Ancient Egyptian ships with a fierce lioness figurehead carved on the bow of two of the ships. Likely this depicted their warrior goddess, Sekhmet, who was seen as their protector. The Phoenicians used horses representing speed. The Ancient Greeks used the heads of boars to symbolise acute vision and ferocity while Roman boats often mounted a carving of a centurion representing valour in battle. In northern Europe, serpents, bulls, dolphins, and dragons were customary and by the thirteenth century, the swan was used representing grace and mobility.

In Germany, Belgium, and the Netherlands, it was once believed that spirits or faeries called Kaboutermannekes (gnomes, little men, faeries) dwelt in the figureheads. The spirit guarded the ship from sickness, rocks, storms, and dangerous winds. If the ship sank, the Kaboutermannekes guided the sailors' souls to the Land of the Dead. To sink without a Kaboutermanneke condemned the sailor's soul to haunt the sea forever, so Dutch sailors believed. A similar belief was found in early Scandinavia.

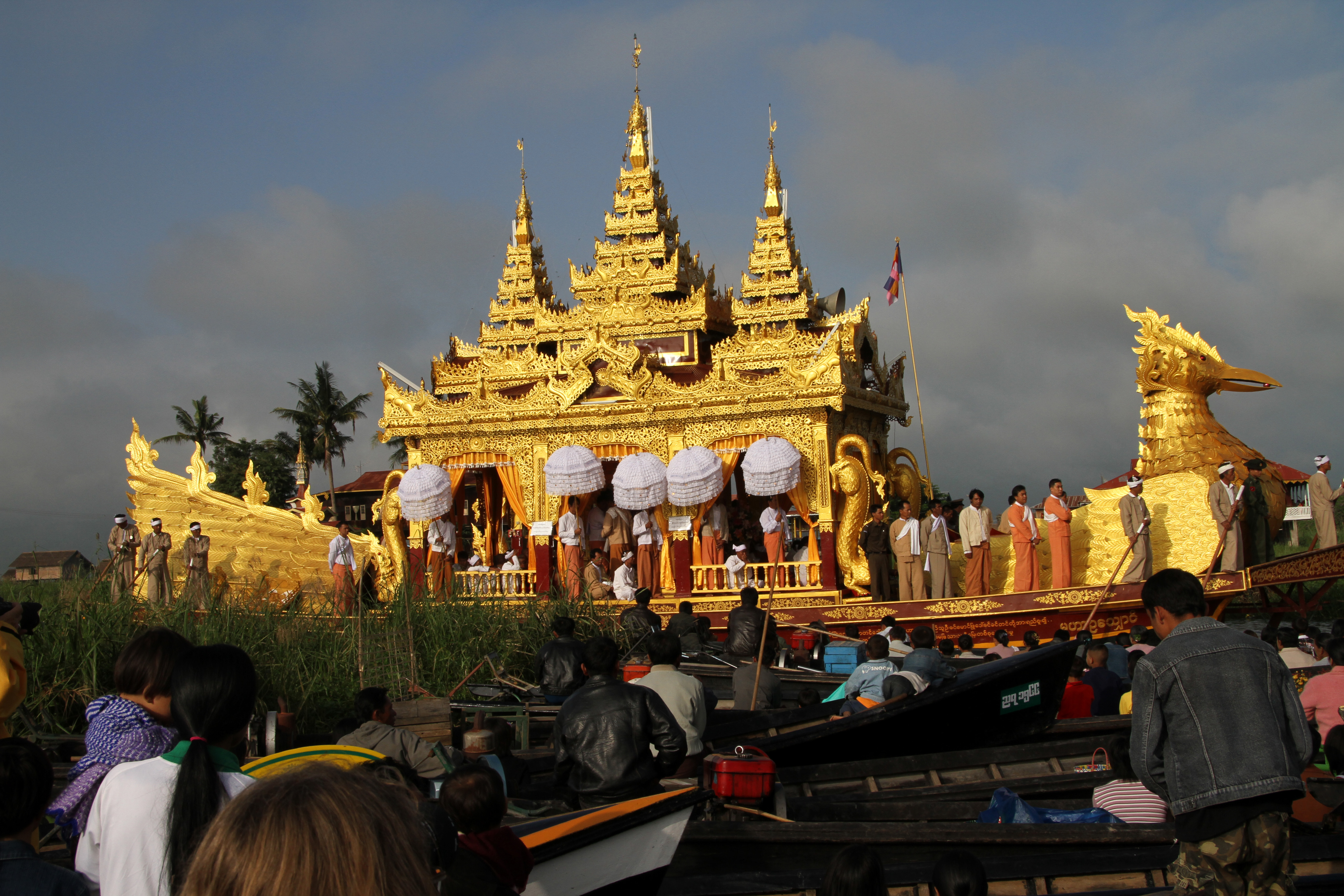
The ceremonial barge used during the annual Phaung Daw U Pagoda festival in Myanmar uses a figurehead at right of a karaweik, a mythical bird.

In pre-colonial Burma, during the Konbaung dynasty, figureheads were used to distinguish several types of royal barges allocated to different members of the royal court; each barge had a specific mythical figurehead at the front.

A general practice of figureheads was introduced in Europe with the galleons of the sixteenth century, as the figurehead as such could not come to be until ships had a stemhead structure on which to place it. During the period from the seventeenth to the eighteenth centuries the carved subjects of figureheads varied from representations of saints to patriotic emblems such as the unicorns or lions popular on British ships. When the ship was named after a royal or naval personage the head and bust of the individual might be shown.

As with the stern ornamentation, the purpose of the figurehead was often to indicate the name of the ship in a non-literate society (albeit in a sometimes very convoluted manner); and always, in the case of naval ships, to demonstrate the wealth and might of the owner. At the height of the Baroque period, some ships boasted gigantic figureheads, weighing several tons and sometimes twinned on both sides of the bowsprit.

A large figurehead, being carved from massive wood and perched on the very foremost tip of the hull, adversely affected the sailing qualities of the ship. This, and cost considerations, led to figureheads being made dramatically smaller during the eighteenth century, and in some cases they were abolished altogether around 1800. After the Napoleonic Wars they made something of a comeback, but were then often in the form of a small waist-up bust rather than the oversized full figures previously used. The clipper ships of the 1850s and 1860s customarily had full figureheads, but these were relatively small and light. During their final stage of common use figureheads ranged in length from about 18 inches (46 cm) to 9 feet (2.7 m).

== British Royal Navy figureheads ==
Naval figurehead design followed many of the same ideas and trends as those created for other maritime vessels. Throughout the seventeenth and eighteenth centuries, the lion was the standard figurehead for lower-ranking naval warships. Symbolising speed, power and aggression, they were considered the perfect emblem for patriotism, intimidation and strength. As animals went out of fashion, so increased the popularity of figureheads carved to depict people. For naval vessels this included personified representations of countries or regions, characters from classic literature such as Greek and Roman mythology, naval heroes and members of the Royal Family.

In 1796, the Admiralty tried to abolish figureheads altogether on new ships, but the order was not wholly complied with. Many sailors felt a ship without a figurehead was an unlucky vessel with superstition running rife in the marine community for centuries. The figurehead was viewed almost as a living being by sailors; a representation of the soul of the ship. Superstition surrounding the necessity of the figurehead was such that if one became damaged it was taken as a sign of bad things to come.

Numerous people were contracted to the Royal Navy as carvers, tasked with designing and carving these ornate decorations. During the nineteenth century, two prominent families of carvers emerged; the Dickersons of Devonport, Plymouth, and the Hellyers of Portsmouth and London, who operated under the company name of Hellyer & Sons. The two families competed regularly with one another for contracts, as well as with other known carvers at the time, such as Robert Hall of Rotherhithe, and the Chicheleys of London. Notably, among the carvers of the Chicheley family was an Elizabeth Chicheley who contributed to the carving works on the figurehead of HMS Royal Sovereign (1786).

The Royal Navy also employed the work of Indian carvers for the figureheads of numerous ships being built at Bombay Dockyard (modern day Mumbai), with whom the likes of Hellyer & Sons also competed, offering to create figureheads in Britain that would later be attached to Indian built ships. Little is known about the Indian men who worked as carvers for the Royal Navy, though it is thought that some may have been Parsi; many Parsi men - known for their skill in shipbuilding - were brought from the Surat province of Gujarat to Bombay under British rule in order to work on East India Company and Royal Navy commissioned ships. Indian worked with Malabar teak, rather than the traditional British pine, desired for its quality and ability to ensure ships lasted in working order for upwards of fifty years. Surviving naval figureheads carved from teak include HMS Seringapatam (1819), HMS Madagascar (1822), HMS Asia (1824), HMS Imaum (1826) and HMS Calcutta (1831).

A carver would submit one or multiple designs for a figurehead to the Surveyor of the Navy, sometimes in colour, though such additions came at a higher cost to the Admiralty. He would also enclose a letter, detailing a breakdown of proposed costs for each element of work. The design was either approved for the proposed amount (sometimes picked over other submissions from different carvers) or rejected until alterations were made; this may have included a smaller figurehead, removal of additional decorations such as swords, instruments or other such adornments, switching from colour paint to white and gold or even the removal of limbs.

Figureheads were carved using a variety of tools including chisels, mallets, gouges and sandpaper to bring designs to life. The size of the figurehead itself was determined by the size of the vessel it was intended for, though could be downsized from a full figure to a 3/4 or bust figure to save money. The overall cost would take into consideration paint – white with gold accents was often preferred over colour as the cheaper option – and additional decoration such as shields, weapons and ornate clothing, which would often be depicted on a figurehead’s trailboards to be more cost effective, as well as the amount of labour involved.

=== Decline in use ===
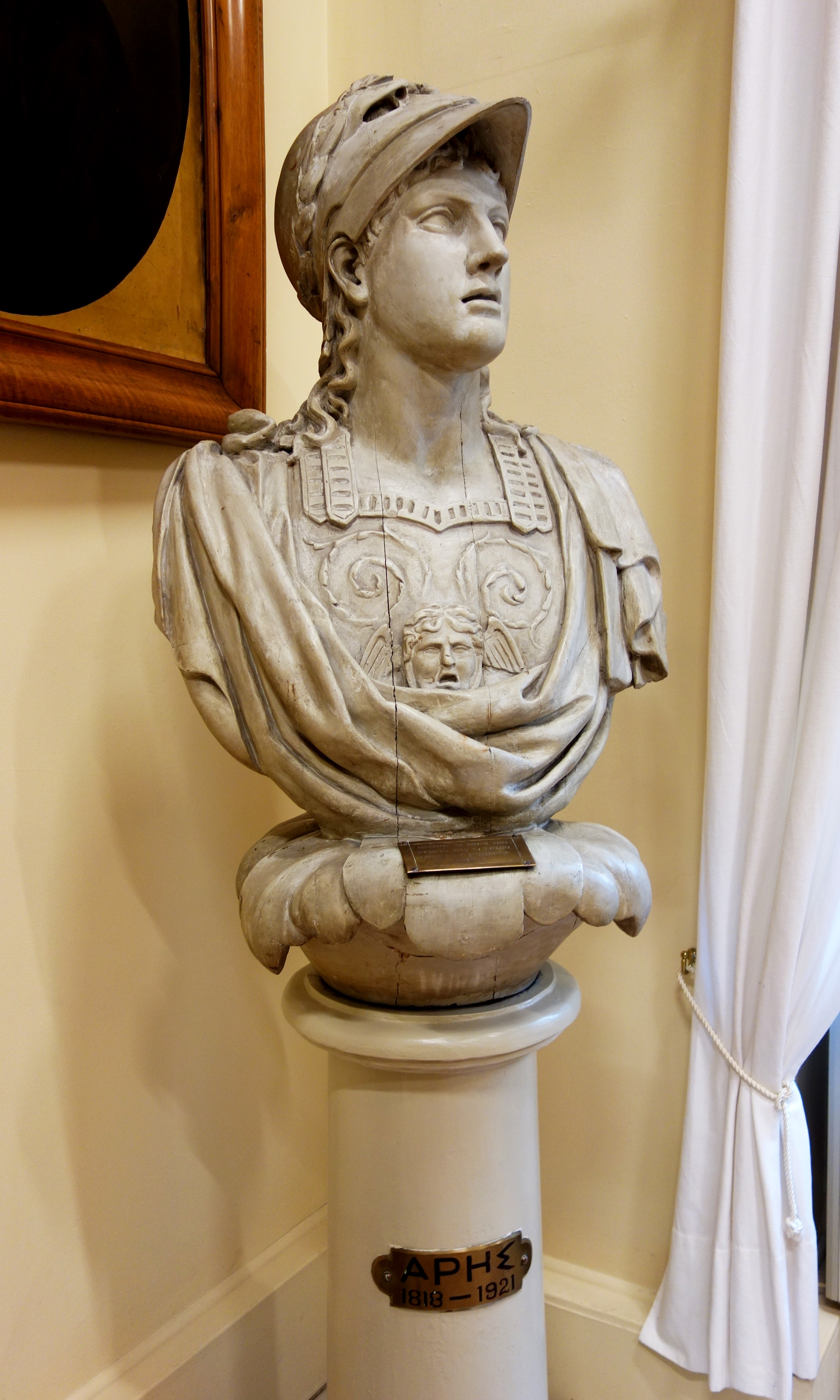
The figurehead of the Greek brig Aris, c. 1807. National Historical Museum, Athens

Figureheads as such died out with the military sailing ship. In addition the vogue for ram bows meant that there was no obvious place to mount one on battleships. An exception was HMS Rodney which was the last British battleship to carry a figurehead. Smaller ships of the Royal Navy continued to carry them. The last example may well have been the sloop HMS Cadmus launched in 1903. Her sister ship Espiegle was the last to sport a figurehead until her breaking up in 1923. Early steamships sometimes had gilt scroll-work and coats-of-arms at their bows. This practice lasted up until about World War I. The 1910 German liner SS Imperator originally sported a large bronze figurehead of an eagle (the Imperial German symbol) standing on a globe. The few extra feet of length added by the figurehead made Imperator the longest ship in the world at the time of her launch.

It is still common practise for warships to carry ships' badges, large plaques mounted on the superstructure with a unique design relating to the ship's name or role. For example, Type 42 destroyers of the Royal Navy, which are named after British cities, carry badges depicting the coat of arms of their namesake.

On smaller vessels, a billethead might be substituted. This was a smaller, nonfigural carving, most often a curl of foliage.

== See also ==
- Acrostolium
- Hood ornament
- Winged victory
