= First Opium War =

1839–1842 war between the United Kingdom and China

- Part of the Opium Wars
- The East India Company steamship Nemesis (right background) destroying war junks during the Second Battle of Chuenpi, 7 January 1841
Date	4 September 1839 – 29 August 1842 (2 years, 11 months, 3 weeks and 4 days)
Location	China
Result	British victory
Territorial changes	Hong Kong Island ceded to the British Empire

Belligerents
Britain: East India Company	(Qing dynasty) China

Commanders and leaders
Queen Victoria; William Lamb; Robert Peel; Henry Temple; Charles Elliot; George Elliot; Gordon Bremer; Hugh Gough; Henry Pottinger; William Parker; Humphrey Senhouse #	Daoguang Emperor; Lin Zexu; Qishan; Yishan; Yijing; Yilibu; Guan Tianpei †; Chen Huacheng †; Ge Yunfei †; Yang Fang; Keying

Strength
≥19,000 troops: British Army: 5,000; Indian Army: nearly 7,000; Remainder were Royal Navy & Royal Marines; 37 ships: 14 sloops-of-war; 8 frigates; 3 ships of the line; 12 other ships (Note: Comprising 5 troopships, 3 brigs, 2 steamers, 1 survey vessel, and 1 hospital ship.)	222,212 total troops (Note: Refers to total troops in the provinces that were in the theatre of war, but only about 100,000 troops were actually mobilised for the war itself.): Eight Banners: 16,708; Green Standard Army: 205,504

Casualties and losses
87 killed; 455 wounded; 3 missing; 284 Indian shipwrecked sailors executed or died in captivity	est. 3,100 killed (Note: Casualties include Manchu bannermen and their families who committed mass suicide at the Battle of Chapu and Battle of Chinkiang.); 4,536 wounded

First Opium War
- Traditional Chinese: 第一次鴉片戰爭
- Simplified Chinese: 第一次鸦片战争
Transcriptions
Standard Mandarin
- Hanyu Pinyin: Dìyīcì yāpiàn zhànzhēng
- Bopomofo: ㄉㄧˋ ㄧ ㄘˋ ㄧㄚ ㄅㄧㄢˋ ㄓㄢˋ ㄓㄥ
- Wade–Giles: Ti^{4}-i^{1}-tzʻu^{4} ya^{1}-pʻien^{4} chan^{4}-cheng^{1}
- Tongyong Pinyin: Dì-yi-cìh ya-piàn jhàn-jheng
- IPA: [tî.í.tsʰɹ̩̂ já.pʰjɛ̂n ʈʂân.ʈʂə́ŋ]
Yue: Cantonese
- Yale Romanization: Daihyātchi Āpin Jinjāng
- Jyutping: Dai6 jat1 ci3 aa1 pin3 zin3 zang1
- IPA: [tɐj˨ jɐt̚˥ tsʰi˧ a˥ pʰin˧ tsin˧ tsɐŋ˥]

The First Opium War (Chinese: 第一次鴉片戰爭; pinyin: Dìyīcì yāpiàn zhànzhēng), also known as the Anglo-Chinese War, was a series of military engagements fought between the British Empire and Qing China between 1839 and 1842. The immediate issue was the Chinese enforcement of their ban on the opium trade by seizing private opium stocks from mainly British merchants at Guangzhou (then named Canton) and threatening to impose the death penalty for future offenders. Despite the opium ban, the British government supported the merchants' demand for compensation for seized goods, and insisted on the principles of free trade and equal diplomatic recognition with China. Twentieth-century nationalists considered 1839 the start of a century of humiliation, and many historians consider it the beginning of modern Chinese history.

Senior government officials within the country had been shown to be colluding against the imperial ban due to stocks of opium in European warehouses in clear view being ignored. In 1839, the Daoguang Emperor, rejecting proposals to legalise and tax opium, appointed Viceroy of Huguang Lin Zexu to go to Guangzhou to halt the opium trade completely. Lin wrote an open letter to Queen Victoria appealing to her moral responsibility to stop the opium trade, although she never received it. Lin then resorted to using force in the western merchants' enclave. He arrived in Guangzhou at the end of January 1839 and organized a coastal defence. In March 1839, British opium dealers were forced to hand over 1,420 tonnes (3.1 million lb) of opium. On 3 June 1839, Lin ordered the opium to be destroyed in public on Humen Beach to show the Government's determination to ban smoking. All other supplies were confiscated and a blockade of foreign ships on the Pearl River was ordered.

Tensions escalated in July 1839 after drunk British sailors killed a Chinese villager named Lin Weixi; the British official in charge, Admiral Charles Elliot, refused to hand over those accused to Chinese authorities in an attempt to avoid their being killed on the spot, as had happened with British citizens in the Lady Hughes Affair of 1784. Later, fighting broke out, with the British navy destroying the Chinese naval blockade, and launching an offensive. In the ensuing conflict, the Royal Navy used its superior naval and gunnery power to inflict a series of decisive defeats on the Chinese Empire.

Opium was Britain's single most profitable commodity trade of the 19th century. After months of tensions between the two states, the Royal Navy launched an expedition in June 1840. Following the Second Battle of Chuenpi on 7 January 1841, the British forces occupied Hong Kong, formally raising the Union Jack on 26 January 1841. The British then imposed the Treaty of Nanking on 29 August 1842, which granted an indemnity and extraterritoriality to British subjects in China, opened five treaty ports to British merchants, and ceded Hong Kong Island to the British Empire in perpetuity. The Treaty of Nanking would be the first of what the Chinese later called the unequal treaties. The resulting social unrest was the background for the Taiping Rebellion, which further weakened the Qing regime.

A Second Opium War would be fought in 1856–1860, in which Britain would be joined by France, which would lead to further unequal treaties and the looting of the Old Summer Palace.

== Background ==
=== Establishment of trade relations ===
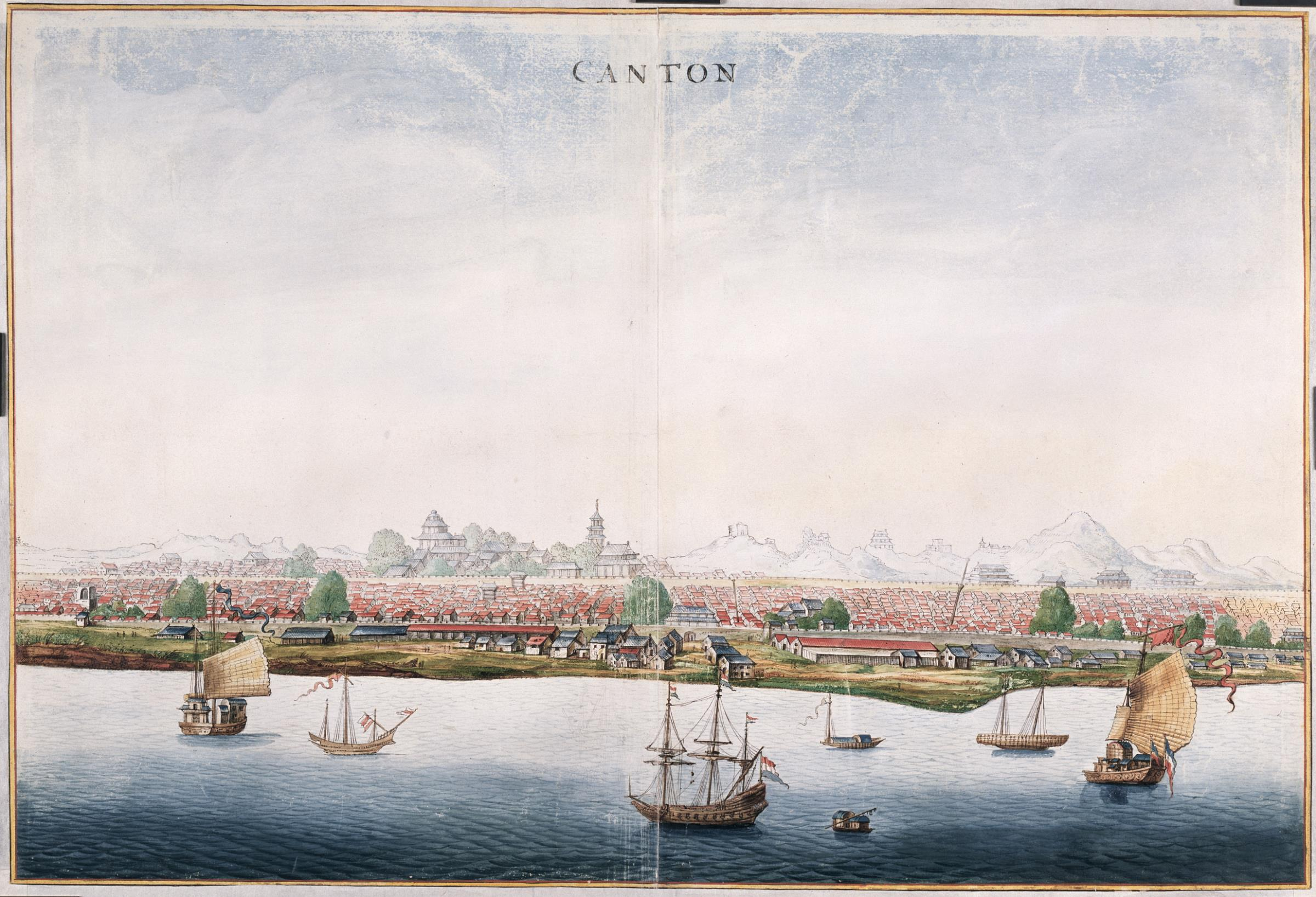
View of Guangzhou with merchant ship of the Dutch East India Company, c. 1665

Direct maritime trade between Europe and China began in 1557 when the Portuguese Empire leased an outpost from the Ming dynasty in Macau. Other European nations soon followed the Portuguese lead, inserting themselves into the existing Asian maritime trade network to compete with Arab, Chinese, Indian, and Japanese merchants in intraregional commerce. After the Spanish conquest of the Philippines, the exchange of goods between China and Europe accelerated dramatically. From 1565, the Manila galleons brought silver into the Asian trade network from mines in South America. China was a primary destination for the precious metal, as the imperial government mandated that Chinese goods could only be exported in exchange for silver bullion.

British ships began to appear sporadically around the coasts of China from 1635 on. Without establishing formal relations through the Chinese tributary system, by which most Asian nations were able to negotiate with China, British merchants were only allowed to trade at the ports of Zhoushan, Xiamen (or Amoy), and Guangzhou. Official British trade was conducted through the auspices of the British East India Company, which held a royal charter for trade with the Far East. The East India Company gradually came to dominate Sino-European trade from its position in India and due to the strength of the Royal Navy.

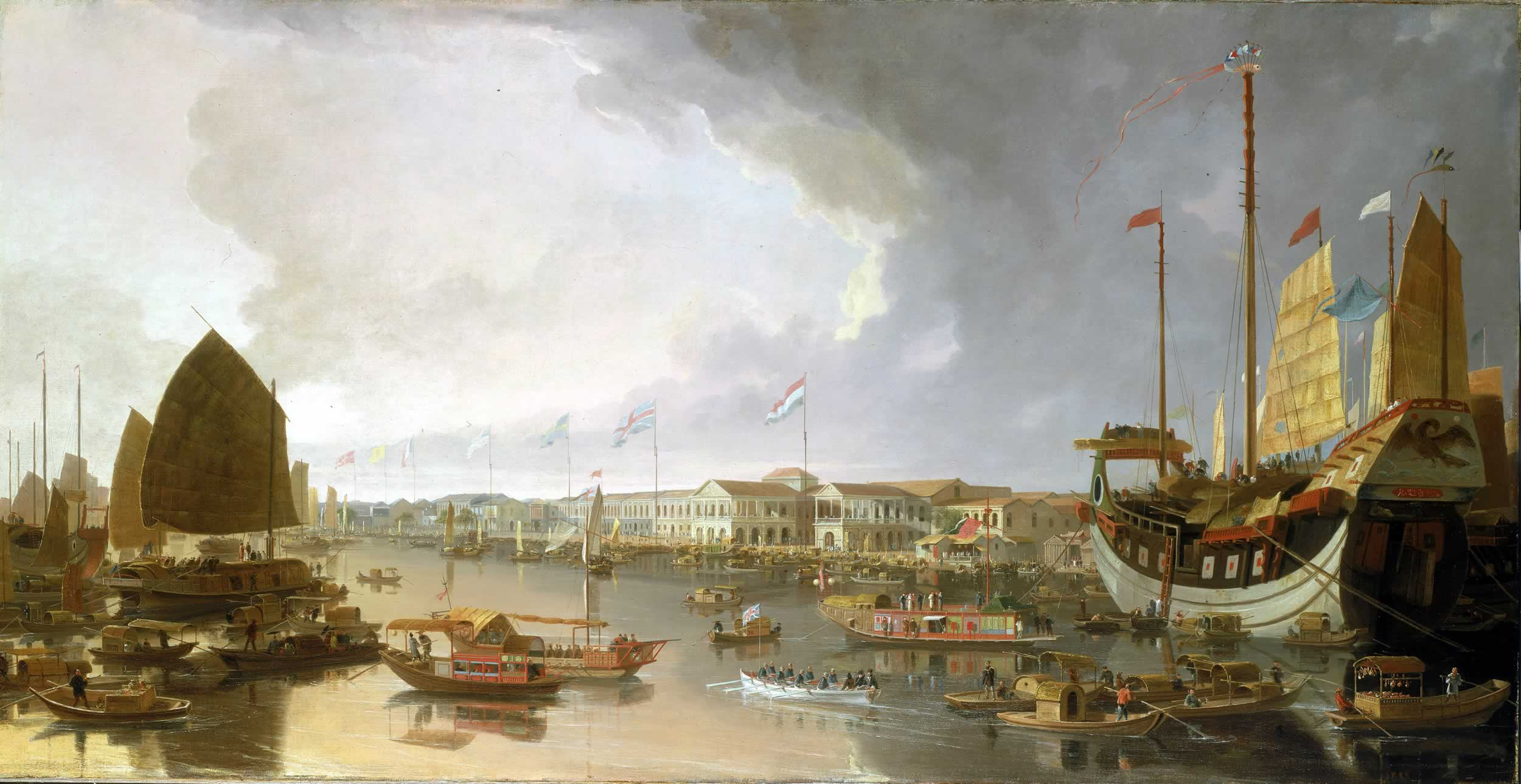
View of the European factories in Guangzhou

Trade benefited after the newly risen Qing dynasty relaxed maritime trade restrictions in the 1680s. Formosa (Taiwan) came under Qing control in 1683 and rhetoric regarding the tributary status of Europeans was muted. Guangzhou became the port of preference for incoming foreign trade. Ships did try to call at other ports, but these locations could not match the benefits of Guangzhou's geographic position at the mouth of the Pearl River, nor did they have the city's long experience in balancing the demands of Beijing with those of Chinese and foreign merchants. From 1700 onward Guangzhou was the centre of maritime trade with China, and this market process was gradually formulated by Qing authorities into the "Canton System". From the system's inception in 1757, trading in China was extremely lucrative for European and Chinese merchants alike as goods such as tea, porcelain, and silk were valued highly enough in Europe to justify the expenses of travelling to Asia. The system was highly regulated by the Qing government. Foreign traders were only permitted to do business through a body of Chinese merchants known as the Cohong and were forbidden to learn Chinese. Foreigners could only live in one of the Thirteen Factories and were not allowed to enter or trade in any other part of China. Only low-level government officials could be dealt with, and the imperial court could not be lobbied for any reason excepting official diplomatic missions. The Imperial laws that upheld the system were collectively known as the Prevention Barbarian Ordinances (防範外夷規條). The Cohong were particularly powerful in the Old China Trade, as they were tasked with appraising the value of foreign products, purchasing or rebuffing said imports and charged with selling Chinese exports at an appropriate price. The Cohong was made up of between (depending on the politics of Guangzhou) 6 to 20 merchant families. Most of the merchant houses these families ruled had been established by low-ranking mandarins, but several were Cantonese or Han in origin. Another key function of the Cohong was the traditional bond signed between a Cohong member and a foreign merchant. This bond stated that the receiving Cohong member was responsible for the foreign merchant's behavior and cargo while in China. In addition to dealing with the Cohong, European merchants were required to pay customs fees, measurement duties, provide gifts, and hire navigators.

Despite restrictions, silk and porcelain continued to drive trade through their popularity in Europe, and an insatiable demand for Chinese tea existed in Britain. From the mid-17th century onward around 28 million kilograms/61.6 million pounds of silver were received by China, principally from European powers, in exchange for Chinese products.

=== European trade deficits ===
A brisk trade between China and European powers continued for over a century. While this trading heavily favoured the Chinese and resulted in European nations sustaining large trade deficits, the demand for Chinese goods continued to drive commerce. In addition, the colonisation and conquest of the Americas resulted in European nations (namely Spain, Great Britain, and France) gaining access to a cheap supply of silver, resulting in European economies remaining relatively stable despite the trade deficit with China. This silver was also shipped across the Pacific Ocean to China directly, notably through the Spanish-controlled Philippines. In stark contrast to the European situation, Qing China sustained a trade surplus. Foreign silver flooded into China in exchange for Chinese goods, expanding the Chinese economy but also causing inflation and forming a Chinese reliance on European silver.

The continued economic expansion of European economies in 17th and 18th centuries gradually increased the European demand for precious metals, which were used to mint new coins; this increasing need for hard currency to remain in circulation in Europe reduced the supply of bullion available for trade in China, driving up costs and leading to competition between merchants in Europe and European merchants who traded with the Chinese. This market force resulted in a chronic trade deficit for European governments, who were forced to risk silver shortages in their domestic economies to supply the needs of their merchants in Asia (who as private enterprises still turned a profit by selling valuable Chinese goods to consumers in Europe). This gradual effect was greatly exacerbated by a series of large-scale colonial wars between Great Britain and Spain in the mid 18th century; these conflicts disrupted the international silver market and eventually resulted in the independence of powerful new nations, namely the United States and Mexico. Without cheap silver from the colonies to sustain their trade, European merchants who traded with China began to take silver directly out of circulation in the already-weakened economies of Europe to pay for goods in China. This angered governments, who saw their economies shrink as a result, and fostered a great deal of animosity towards the Chinese for their restriction of European trade. The Chinese economy was unaffected by fluctuations in silver prices, as China was able to import Japanese silver to stabilise its money supply. European goods remained in low demand in China, ensuring the longstanding trade surplus with the European nations continued. Despite these tensions, trade between China and Europe grew by an estimated 4% annually in the years leading up to the start of the opium trade.

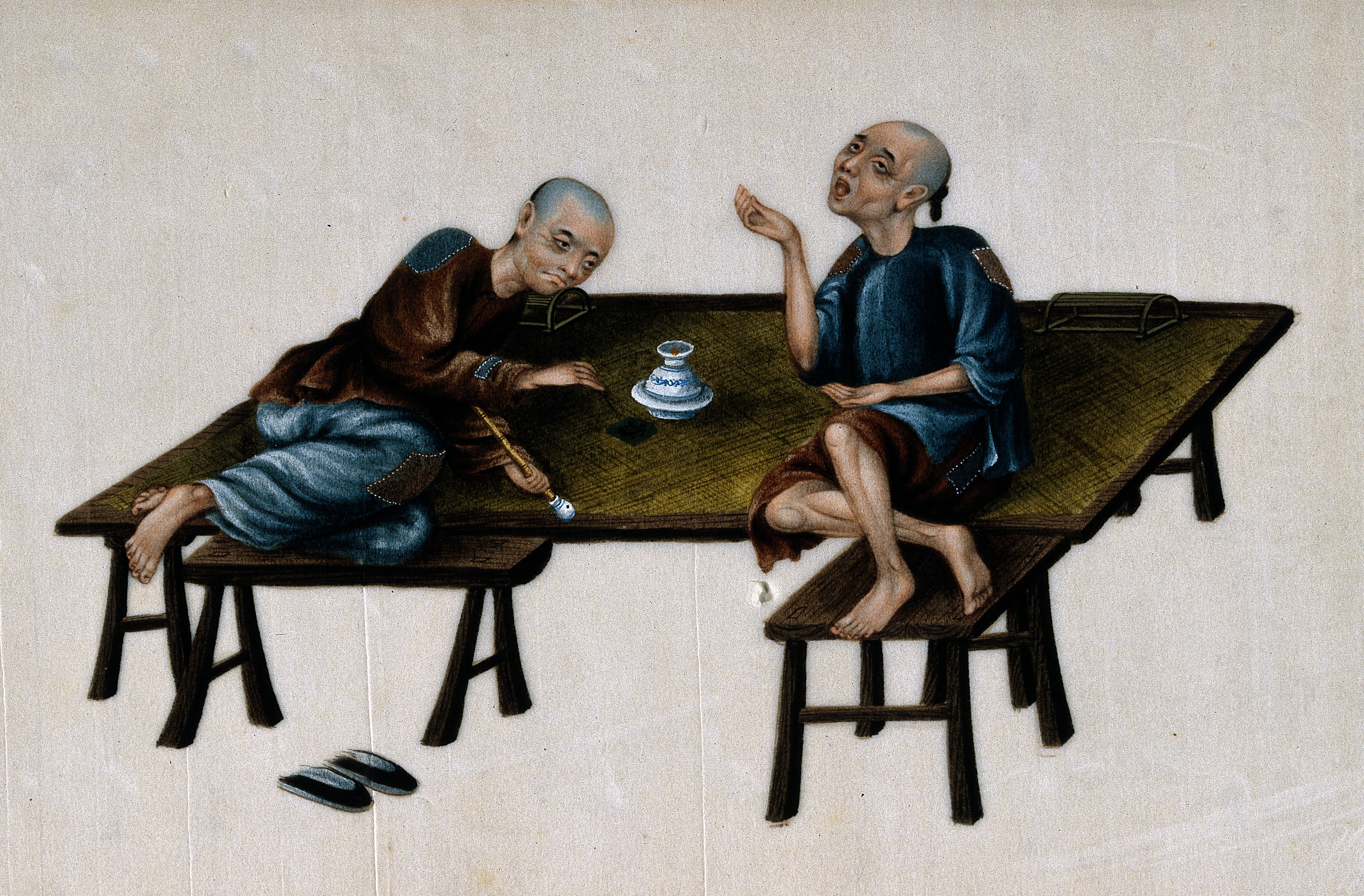
Chinese opium smokers

=== Opium trade ===
Opium as a medicinal ingredient was documented in Chinese texts as early as the Tang dynasty (618–907), but recreational usage of the drug was limited. As with India, opium (then limited by distance to a dried powder, often drunk with tea or water) was introduced to China and Southeast Asia by Arab merchants. The Ming dynasty banned tobacco as a decadent good in 1640, and opium was seen as a similarly minor issue. The first restrictions on opium were issued by the Qing in 1729 when madak (a substance made from powdered opium blended with tobacco) was banned. At the time, madak production used up most of the opium being imported into China, as pure opium was difficult to preserve. Consumption of Javanese opium rose in the 18th century, and after the Napoleonic Wars resulted in the British occupying Java from 1811 to 1816, British merchants became the primary traders in opium. The British realised they could reduce their trade deficit with Chinese manufactories by counter-trading in narcotic opium, and therefore efforts were made to produce more opium in Company-controlled India. Limited British sales of Indian opium began in 1781, with exports to China increasing as the East India Company solidified its control over India.

The British opium was produced in Bengal and in the Ganges river plain, where the British inherited an existing opium-industry from the declining Mughal Empire and identified the product as a potentially valuable export. The East India Company commissioned and managed hundreds of thousands of poppy plantations. It took care of the painstaking lancing of individual pods to obtain the raw gum, drying and forming it into cakes, before coating and packaging them for auction in Calcutta (present-day Kolkata). The Company tightly controlled the opium industry, and all opium was considered Company property until it was sold. From Calcutta, the Company's Board of Customs, Salt, and Opium concerned itself with quality control by managing the way opium was packaged and shipped. No poppies could be cultivated without the Company's permission, and the Company banned private businesses from refining opium. All opium in India was sold to the Company at a fixed rate, and the company hosted a series of public opium-auctions every year. The difference between the Company-set price of raw opium and the sale price of refined opium at auction (minus expenses) was profit made by the East India Company. In addition to securing poppies cultivated on lands under its direct control, the Company's board issued licences to the independent princely states of Malwa, where significant quantities of poppies were grown.

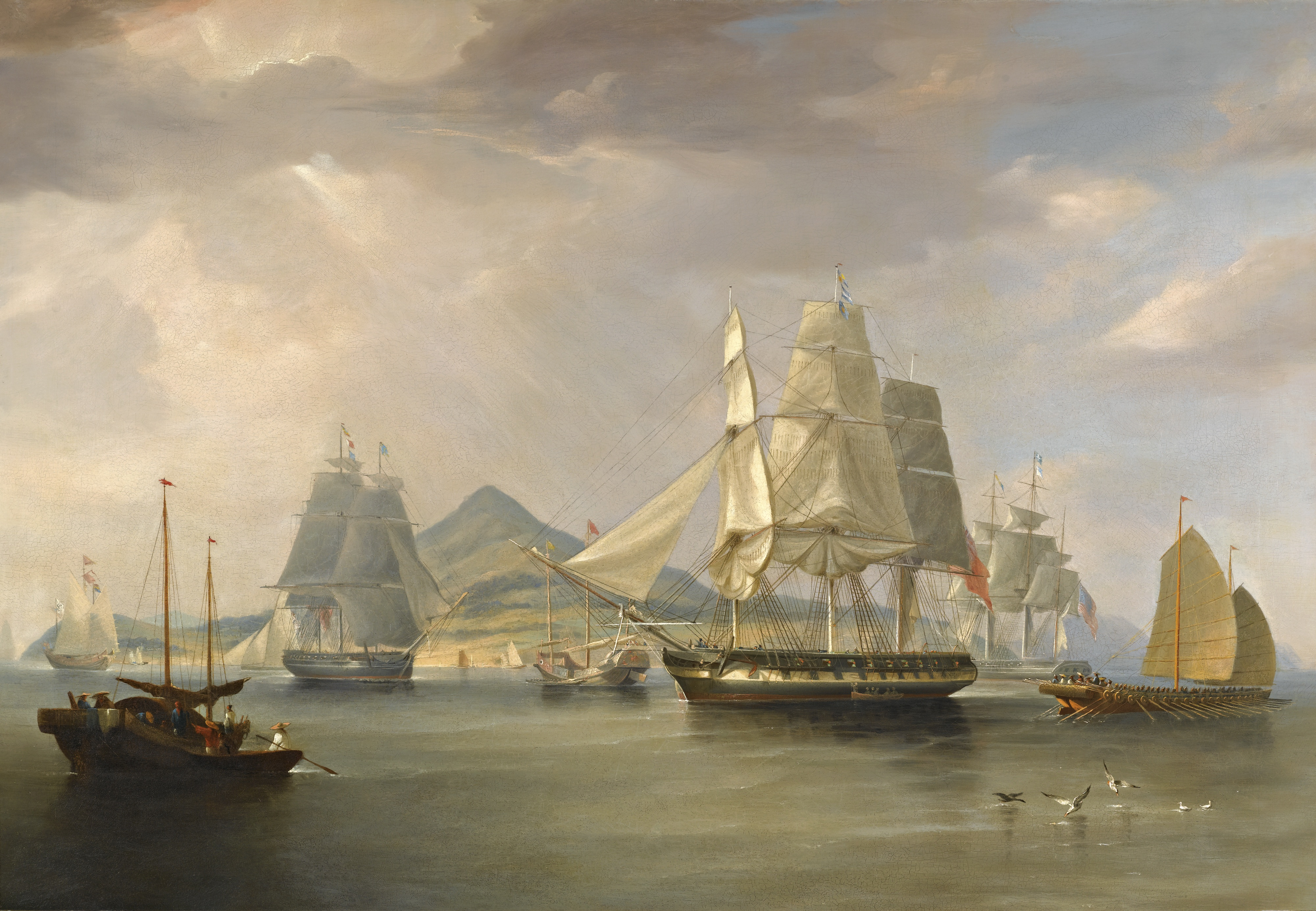
A depiction of opium ships at Lintin, China by the British artist William John Huggins in 1824

By the late 18th century, Company and Malwan farmlands (which were traditionally dependent on cotton-growing) had been hard hit by the introduction of factory-produced cotton cloth, which used cotton grown in Egypt or in the American South. Opium was considered a lucrative replacement, and was soon being auctioned in ever larger amounts in Calcutta. Private merchants who possessed a Company charter (to comply with the British royal charter for Asiatic trade) bid on and acquired goods at the Calcutta auction before sailing to Southern China. British ships brought their cargoes to islands off the coast, especially Lintin Island, where Chinese traders with fast and well-armed small boats took the goods inland for distribution, paying for the opium with silver. The Qing administration initially tolerated opium importation because it created an indirect tax on Chinese subjects, as increasing the silver supply available to foreign merchants through the sale of opium encouraged Europeans to spend more money on Chinese goods. This policy provided the funds which British merchants needed to then greatly increase tea exports from China to England, delivering further profits to the Qing monopoly on tea exports held by China's imperial treasury and its agents in Guangzhou.

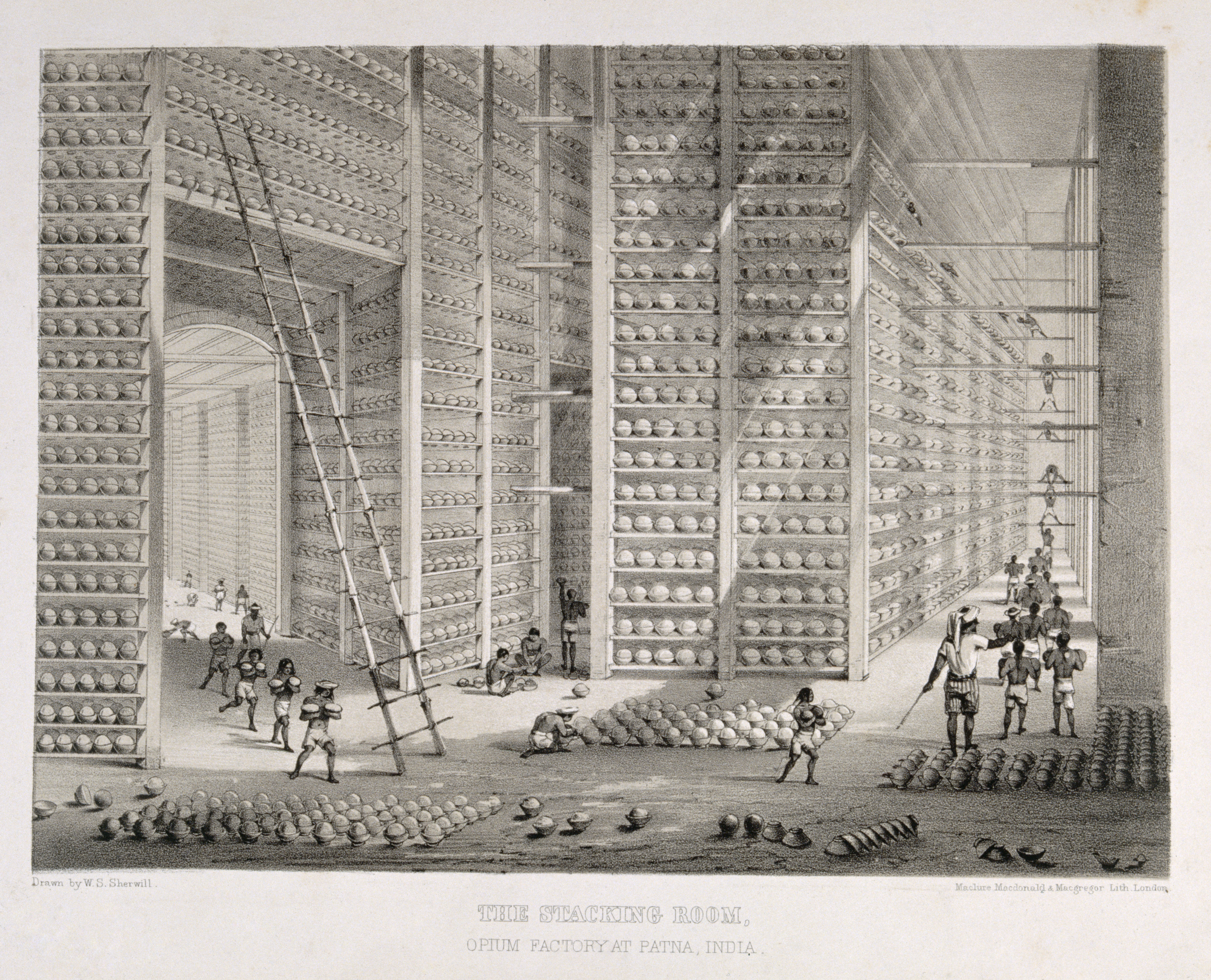
A British lithograph depicting a storehouse filled with opium at the factory of the British East India Company in Patna, India c. 1850

However, opium usage continued to grow in China, adversely affecting social stability. From Guangzhou, the habit spread outwards to the North and West, affecting members from every class of Chinese society. By the early 19th century, more and more Chinese were smoking Indian opium as a recreational drug. For many, what started as recreation soon became a punishing addiction: many people who stopped ingesting opium suffered chills, nausea, and cramps, and sometimes died from withdrawal. Once addicted, people would often do almost anything to continue to get access to the drug. These serious social issues eventually led to the Qing government issuing an edict against the drug in 1780, followed by an outright ban in 1796, and an order from the governor of Guangzhou to stop the trade in 1799. To circumvent the increasingly stringent regulations in Guangzhou, foreign merchants bought older ships and converted them into floating warehouses. These ships were anchored off of the Chinese coast at the mouth of the Pearl River in case the Chinese authorities moved against the opium trade, as the ships of the Chinese navy had difficulty operating in open water. Inbound opium ships would unload a portion of their cargo onto these floating warehouses, where the narcotic was eventually purchased by Chinese opium dealers. By implementing this system of smuggling, foreign merchants could avoid inspection by Chinese officials and prevent retaliation against the trade in legal goods, in which many smugglers also participated.

In the early 19th century, American merchants joined the trade and began to introduce opium from Turkey into the Chinese market—this supply was of lesser quality but cheaper, and the resulting competition among British and American merchants drove down the price of opium, leading to an increase in the availability of the drug for Chinese consumers. The demand for opium rose rapidly and was so profitable in China that Chinese opium dealers (who, unlike European merchants, could legally travel to and sell goods in the Chinese interior) began to seek out more suppliers of the drug. The resulting shortage in supply drew more European merchants into the increasingly lucrative opium trade to meet the Chinese demand. In the words of one trading house agent, "[Opium] is like gold. I can sell it anytime." From 1804 to 1820, a period when the Qing treasury needed to finance the suppression of the White Lotus Rebellion and other conflicts, the flow of money gradually reversed, and Chinese merchants were soon exporting silver to pay for opium rather than Europeans paying for Chinese goods with the precious metal. European and American ships were able to arrive in Guangzhou with their holds filled with opium, sell their cargo, use the proceeds to buy Chinese goods, and turn a profit in the form of silver bullion. This silver would then be used to acquire more Chinese goods. While opium remained the most profitable good to trade with China, foreign merchants began to export other cargoes, such as machine-spun cotton cloth, rattan, ginseng, fur, clocks, and steel tools. However, these goods never reached the same level of importance as narcotics, nor were they as lucrative.

Graph showing the increase in Chinese opium imports by year

The Qing imperial court debated whether or how to end the opium trade, but their efforts to curtail opium abuse were complicated by local officials and the Cohong, who profited greatly from the bribes and taxes involved in the narcotics trade. Efforts by Qing officials to curb opium imports through regulations on consumption resulted in an increase in drug smuggling by European and Chinese traders, and corruption was rampant. In 1810, the Jiaqing Emperor issued an edict concerning the opium crisis, declaring,

Opium has a harm. Opium is a poison, undermining our good customs and morality. Its use is prohibited by law. Now the commoner, Yang, dares to bring it into the Forbidden City. Indeed, he flouts the law! However, recently the purchasers, eaters, and consumers of opium have become numerous. Deceitful merchants buy and sell it to gain profit. The customs house at the Ch'ung-wen Gate was originally set up to supervise the collection of imports (it had no responsibility with regard to opium smuggling). If we confine our search for opium to the seaports, we fear the search will not be sufficiently thorough. We should also order the general commandant of the police and police—censors at the five gates to prohibit opium and to search for it at all gates. If they capture any violators, they should immediately punish them and should destroy the opium at once. As to Kwangtung [Guangdong] and Fukien [Fujian], the provinces from which opium comes, we order their viceroys, governors, and superintendents of the maritime customs to conduct a thorough search for opium, and cut off its supply. They should in no ways consider this order a dead letter and allow opium to be smuggled out!

Nonetheless, by 1831, the annual opium traffic neared 20,000 chests, each with a net weight of around 140 pounds, compared with just about 4,000 chests per year between 1800 and 1818. After the East India Company's monopoly on tea ended in 1833 and private merchants began to join in, this quantity would go on to double before the close of the decade.

Bengal and India, under the British Raj, experienced mixed effects from the Britain-China opium trade. On one hand, millions died in Bengal during the famine of 1770 after agricultural land was forcibly converted to poppy cultivation. Small farmers in India's Bihar Province were compelled to grow poppies without profit. On the other hand, opium became the main driver of capital accumulation for merchants and bankers in western India. The Indian government's revenue from opium trade rose from less than five percent of its total in the early 1800s to nearly 17 percent in 1890. The income helped British rule and the East India Company expand further in the region.

The opium profits of the Royal Dutch Trading Company in the Dutch East Indies financed several enterprises, such as Royal Dutch Shell. A few American merchants also made a fortune from the opium trade and invested their proceeds in railroads, hotel chains, and manufacturing in the United States.

=== Changing trade policy ===
In addition to the start of the opium trade, economic and social innovations led to a change in the parameters of the wider Sino-European trade. The formulation of classical economics by Adam Smith and other economic theorists caused academic belief in mercantilism to decline in Britain. Under the prior system, the Qianlong Emperor restricted trade with foreigners on Chinese soil only for licensed Chinese merchants, while the British government on their part issued a monopoly charter for trade only to the British East India Company. This arrangement was not challenged until the 19th century when the idea of free trade was popularised in the West. Fueled by the Industrial Revolution, Britain began to use its growing naval power to spread a broadly liberal economic model, encompassing open markets and relatively barrier free international trade, a policy in line with the credo of Smithian economics. This stance on trade was intended to open foreign markets to the resources of Britain's colonies, as well as provide the British public with greater access to consumer goods such as tea. In Great Britain, the adoption of the gold standard in 1821 resulted in the empire minting standardised silver shillings, further reducing the availability of silver for trade in Asia and spurring the British government to press for more trading rights in China.

In contrast to this new economic model, the Qing dynasty continued to employ a Confucian-Modernist, highly organised economic philosophy that called for strict government intervention in industry for the sake of preserving societal stability. While the Qing government was not explicitly anti-trade, a lack of need for imports and increasingly heavy taxes on luxury goods limited pressure on the government to open further ports to international trade. China's rigid merchant hierarchy also blocked efforts to open ports to foreign ships and businesses. Chinese merchants operating in inland China wanted to avoid market fluctuations caused by importing foreign goods that would compete with domestic production, while the Cohong families of Guangzhou profited greatly by keeping their city the only entry point for foreign products.

At the turn of the 19th century, countries such as Great Britain, the Netherlands, Denmark, Russia, and the United States began to seek additional trading rights in China. Foremost among the concerns of the western nations was the end of the Canton System and the opening of China's vast consumer markets to trade. Britain in particular was keenly increasing its exports to China, as the empire's implementation of the gold standard forced it to purchase silver and gold from continental Europe and Mexico to further fuel its rapidly industrialising economy. Attempts by a British embassy (led by Macartney in 1793), a Dutch mission (under Jacob Pieter van Braam in 1794), Russia (headed by Yury Golovkin in 1805), and the British again (Earl William Amherst in 1816) to negotiate increased access to the Chinese market were all vetoed by successive Qing emperors. Upon his meeting the Jiaqing Emperor in 1816, Amherst refused to perform the traditional kowtow, an act that the Qing saw as a severe breach of etiquette. Amherst and his party were expelled from China, a diplomatic rebuke that angered the British government.

One major reason was that British consumers had developed a strong liking for Chinese tea, as well as other goods like porcelain and silk. But Chinese consumers had no similar preference for any goods produced in Britain. Because of this trade imbalance, Britain increasingly had to use silver to pay for its expanding purchases of Chinese goods. Britain suffered from a huge trade deficit during the Sino-British trade. Meanwhile, the high tariff made the British government very dissatisfied with the Qing government. The Chinese only allowed silver in exchange for the products they were offering so a significant amount of this commodity was leaving the British Empire.

As its merchants gained increasing influence in China, Great Britain bolstered its military strength in Southern China. Britain began sending warships to combat piracy on the Pearl River, and in 1808 established a permanent garrison of British troops in Macau to defend against French attacks.

=== Foreign merchants in Guangzhou ===
As the opium-fuelled China Trade increased in scope and value, the foreign presence in Guangzhou and Macau grew in size and influence. The Thirteen Factories district of Guangzhou continued to expand, and was labelled the "foreign quarter". A small population of merchants began to stay in Guangzhou year round (most merchants lived in Macau for the summer months, then moved to Guangzhou in the winter), and a local chamber of commerce was formed. In the first two decades of the 19th century, the increasingly sophisticated (and profitable) trade between Europe and China allowed for a clique of European merchants to rise to positions of great importance in China. The most notable of these figures were William Jardine and James Matheson (who went on to found Jardine Matheson), British merchants who operated a consignment and shipping business in Guangzhou and Macau, with associates such as Jamsetjee Jejeebhoy, who became their principal supplier in India. While all three dealt in legal goods, they also profited greatly from selling opium. Jardine in particular was effective in navigating the political environment of Guangzhou to allow for more narcotics to be smuggled into China. He was also contemptuous of the Chinese legal system, and often used his economic influence to subvert Chinese authorities. This included his (with Matheson's support) petitioning for the British government to attempt to gain trading rights and political recognition from Imperial China, by force if necessary. In addition to trade, some western missionaries arrived and began to proselytise Christianity to the Chinese. While some officials tolerated this (Macau-based Jesuits had been active in China since the early 17th century), some officials clashed with Chinese Christians, raising tensions between western merchants and Qing officials.

While the foreign community in Guangzhou grew in influence, the local government began to suffer from civil discord inside China. The White Lotus Rebellion (1796–1804) drained the Qing dynasty's treasury of silver, forcing the government to levy increasingly heavy taxes on merchants. These taxes did not abate after the rebellion was crushed, as the Chinese government began a massive project to repair state-owned properties on the Yellow River, referred to as the "Yellow River Conservancy". The merchants of Guangzhou were further expected to make contributions to fight banditry. These taxes weighed heavily on the profits made by the Cohong merchants; by the 1830s, the once-prosperous Cohong had seen their wealth greatly reduced. In addition, the declining value of China's domestic currency resulted in many people in Guangzhou using foreign silver coins (Spanish coins were the most valued, followed by American coins) as they contained higher amounts of silver. Using western coins allowed Cantonese coiners to make many Chinese coins from melted-down western coins, greatly increasing the city's wealth, and tax revenue while tying much of the economy of the city to the foreign merchants.

A significant development came in 1834 when reformers (some of whom were financially backed by Jardine) in Britain, advocating for free trade, succeeded in ending the monopoly of the British East India Company under the Charter Act of the previous year. This shift in trade policy ended the need for merchants to comply with the royal charter for trade in the far east; with this centuries-old restriction lifted, the British China trade was opened to private entrepreneurs, many of whom joined the highly profitable opium trade.

On the eve of the Qing government's crackdown on opium, a Chinese official described the changes in society caused by the drug;

At the beginning, opium smoking was confined to the fops of wealthy families who took up the habit as a form of conspicuous consumption, even they knew that they should not indulge in it to the greatest extreme. Later, people of all social strata—from government officials and members of the gentry to craftsmen, merchants, entertainers, and servants, and even women, Buddhist monks and nuns, and Taoist priests—took up the habit and openly bought and equipped themselves with smoking instruments. Even in the center of our dynasty—the nation's capital and its surrounding areas—some of the inhabitants have also been contaminated by this dreadful poison.

==== Napier Affair ====
In late 1834, to accommodate the revocation of the East India Company's monopoly, the British sent William John Napier to Macau along with John Francis Davis and Sir George Robinson, 2nd Baronet, as British superintendents of trade in China. Napier was instructed to obey Chinese regulations, communicate directly with Chinese authorities, superintend trade pertaining to the contraband trade of opium, and to survey China's coastline. Upon his arrival in China, Napier tried to circumvent the restrictive system that forbade direct contact with Chinese officials by sending a letter directly to the Viceroy of Liangguang, Lu Kun, requesting a meeting. The Viceroy refused to accept it, and on 2 September of that year an edict was issued that temporarily closed British trade. In response, Napier ordered two Royal Navy vessels to bombard Chinese forts on the Pearl River strait, the Bocca Tigris, in a show of force. This command was followed through, but war was avoided due to Napier falling ill with typhus and ordering a retreat. The brief gunnery duel drew condemnation by the Chinese government, as well as criticism from the British government and foreign merchants. Other nationalities, such as the Americans, prospered through their continued peaceful trade with China, but the British were told to leave Guangzhou for either Whampoa or Macau. Lord Napier was forced to return to Macau in September, where he died of typhus a month later, on 11 October.

After Lord Napier's death, Captain Charles Elliot received the King's Commission as Superintendent of Trade in 1836 to continue Napier's work of conciliating the Chinese.

== Escalation of tensions ==
=== Crackdown on opium ===
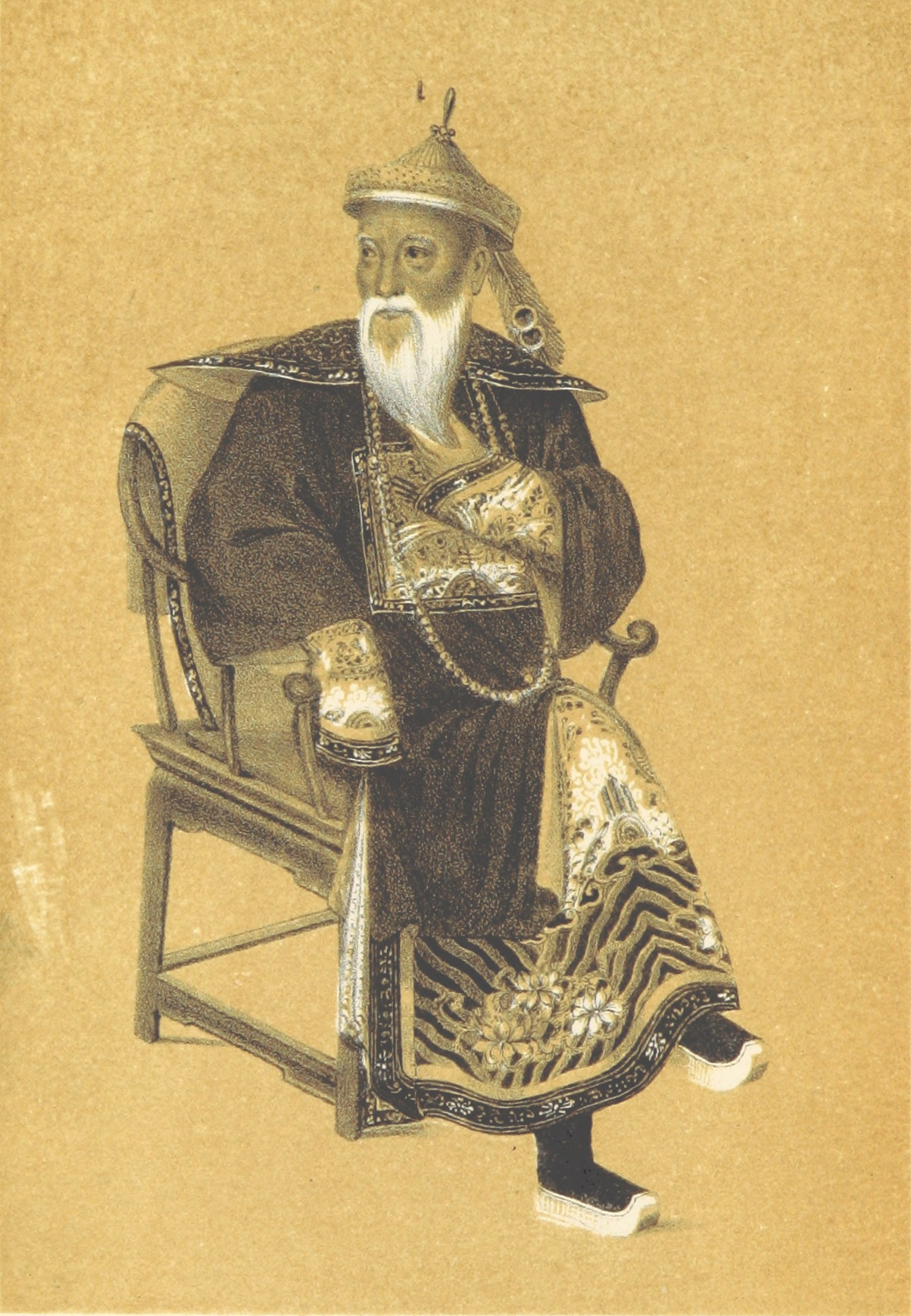
Commissioner Lin Zexu, dubbed "Lin of Clear Skies" for his moral integrity.

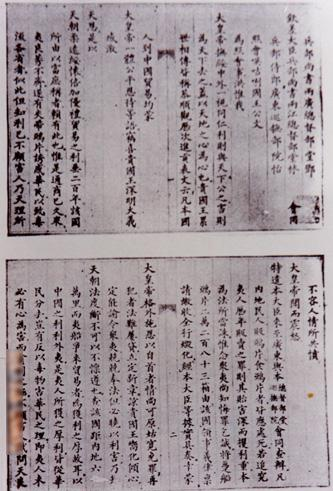
Lin Zexu's "memorial" (摺奏) written directly to Queen Victoria

By 1838, the British were selling roughly 1,400 long tons (1,400,000 kg) of opium per year to China. Legalization of the opium trade was the subject of ongoing debate within the Chinese administration, but a proposal to legalise the narcotic was repeatedly rejected, and by 1838 the government had begun to impose increasingly severe penalties on Chinese drug traffickers. Opinions were polarized into two sides. One side adopted a pragmatic approach that favored regulating the opium trade rather than maintaining strict prohibition. Officials such as Xu Naiji argued that the importation and sale should be legalized and then taxed by the Chinese government. Their belief was that legalization and taxation could reduce smuggling, generate additional government revenue, and help address revenue shortages associated with the outflow of silver. The other side, later led by, Lin Zexu, argued that the opium trade was a moral issue and an "evil" that needed to be eliminated.

There were also long-term factors that pushed the Chinese government into action. Historian Jonathan D. Spence lists these factors that led to war:

the social dislocations that began to appear in the Qing world, the spread of addiction, the growth of a hard-line mentality toward foreigners, foreign refusal to accept Chinese legal norms, changes in international trade structures, and the ending of Western intellectuals' admiration for China.... When the tough prohibitions of 1838 began to take effect, the market diminished and dealers found themselves dangerously oversupplied. A second contributing factor was that the new British post of superintendent of foreign trade in China was held by a deputy of the British crown....If the Chinese crossed the superintendent, they would be insulting the British nation rather than the business corporation....[The superintendent could] call directly on the aid of British armed Forces and the Royal Navy in times of serious trouble.

In 1839, the Daoguang Emperor appointed scholar-official Lin Zexu to the post of Special Imperial Commissioner with the task of eradicating the opium trade. Lin's famous open "Letter To Queen Victoria" appealed to Queen Victoria's moral reasoning. Citing what he mistakenly understood to be a strict prohibition on opium within Great Britain, Lin questioned how Britain could declare itself moral while its merchants profited from the legal sale in China of a drug that was banned in Britain. He wrote: "Your Majesty has not before been thus officially notified, and you may plead ignorance of the severity of our laws, but I now give my assurance that we mean to cut this harmful drug forever." The letter never reached the Queen, with one source suggesting that it was lost in transit. Lin pledged that nothing would divert him from his mission, "If the traffic in opium were not stopped a few decades from now we shall not only be without soldiers to resist the enemy, but also in want of silver to provide an army." Lin banned the sale of opium and demanded that all supplies of the drug be surrendered to the Chinese authorities. He also closed the Pearl River Channel, trapping British traders in Guangzhou. As well as seizing opium stockpiles in warehouses and the thirteen factories, Chinese troops boarded British ships in the Pearl River and South China Sea before destroying the opium on board.

The British Superintendent of Trade in China, Charles Elliot, protested the decision to forcibly seize the opium stockpiles. He ordered all ships carrying opium to flee and prepare for battle. Lin responded by besieging the foreign dealers in the foreign quarter of Guangzhou, and kept them from communicating with their ships in port. To defuse the situation, Elliot convinced the British traders to cooperate with Chinese authorities and hand over their opium stockpiles with the promise of eventual compensation for their losses by the British government. While this amounted to a tacit acknowledgment that the British government did not disapprove of the trade, it also placed a huge liability on the exchequer. This promise, and the inability of the British government to pay it without causing a political storm, was used as an important casus belli for the subsequent British attack. During April and May 1839, British and American dealers surrendered 20,283 chests and 200 sacks of opium. The stockpile was publicly destroyed on the beach outside Guangzhou.

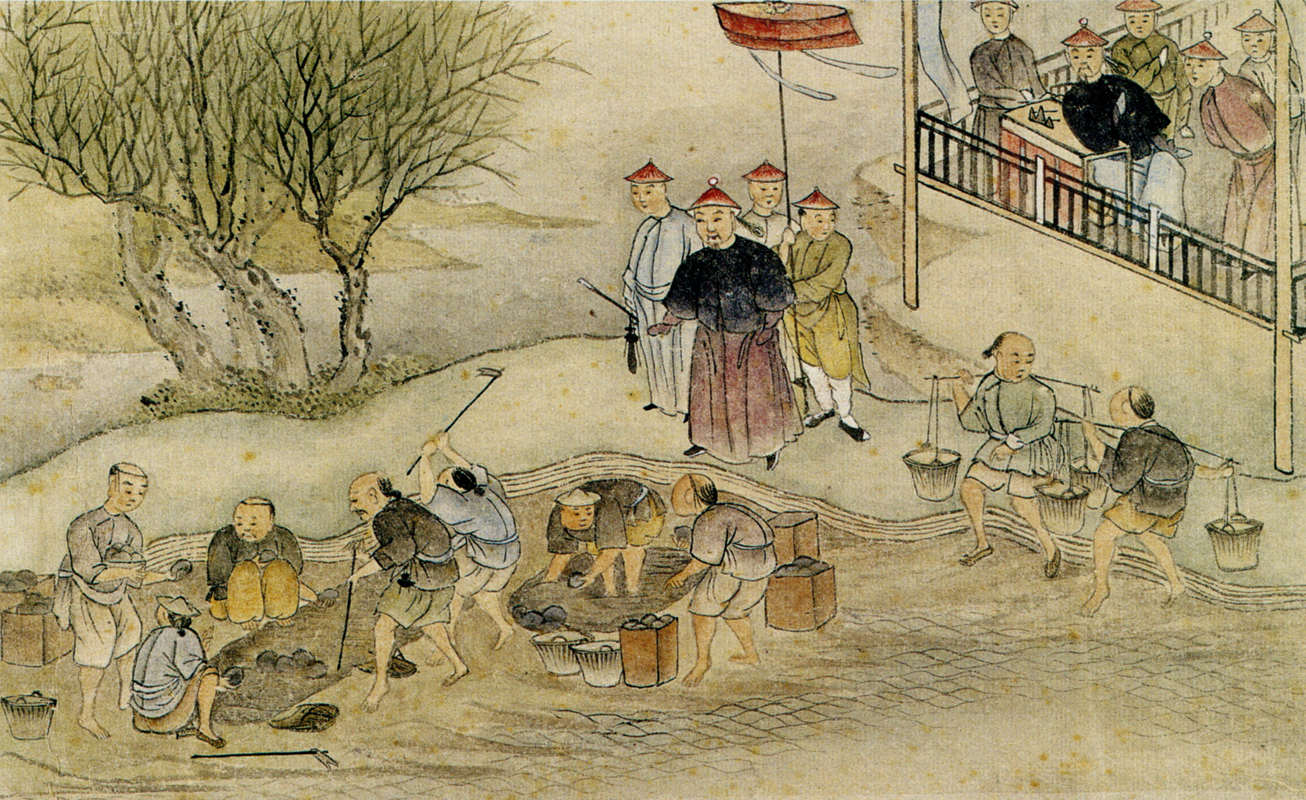
Contemporary Chinese depiction of the destruction of opium under Commissioner Lin.

After the opium was surrendered, trade was restarted on the strict condition that no more opium be shipped into China. Looking for a way to effectively police foreign trade and purge corruption, Lin and his advisers decided to reform the existing bond system. Under this system, a foreign captain and the Cohong merchant who had purchased the goods off of his ship swore that the vessel carried no illegal goods. Upon examining the records of the port, Lin was infuriated to find that in the 20 years since opium had been declared illegal, not a single infraction had been reported. As a consequence, Lin demanded that all foreign merchants and Qing officials sign a new bond promising not to deal in opium under penalty of death. The British government opposed their signing of the bond, feeling that it violated the principle of free trade, but some merchants who did not trade in opium (such as Olyphant & Co.) were willing to sign against Elliot's orders. Trade in regular goods continued unabated, and the scarcity of opium caused by the seizure of the foreign warehouses caused the black market to flourish. Some newly arrived merchant ships were able to learn of the ban on opium before they entered the Pearl River estuary, and so they unloaded their cargoes at Lintin Island. The opportunity caused by the sharp rise in the price of opium was seized upon by some of the Cohong trading houses and smugglers, who were able to evade commissioner Lin's efforts and smuggled more opium into China. Superintendent Elliot was aware of the smugglers' activities on Lintin and was under orders to stop them, but feared that any action by the Royal Navy could spark a war and withheld his ships.

=== Skirmish at Kowloon ===
In early July 1839 a group of British merchant sailors in Kowloon became intoxicated after consuming rice liqueur. Two of the sailors became agitated with and beat to death Lin Weixi, a villager from nearby Tsim Sha Tsui. Superintendent Elliot ordered the arrest of the two men, and paid compensation to Lin's family and village. However, he refused a request to turn the sailors over to Chinese authorities, fearing they would be killed in accordance with the Chinese legal code. Commissioner Lin saw this as an obstruction of justice and Chinese sovereignty, therefore he ordered the sailors to be handed over. Elliot instead held a trial for the accused men aboard a warship at sea, with himself serving as the judge and merchant captains serving as jurors. He invited the Qing authorities to observe and comment on the proceedings, but the offer was declined. The naval court convicted 5 sailors of assault and rioting, and sentenced them to fines along with hard labour in Britain (a verdict later overturned in British courts).

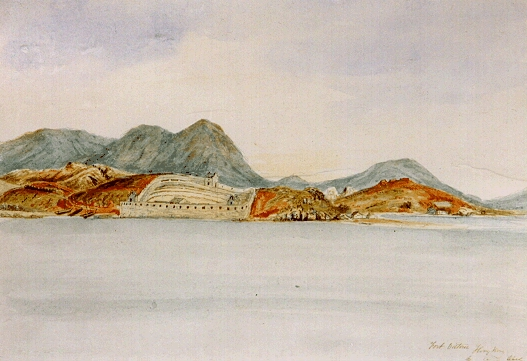
1841 painting of the Chinese fort at Kowloon.

Angered by the violation of China's sovereignty, Lin recalled Chinese labourers from Macau and issued an edict preventing the sale of food to the British. War Junks were deployed to the mouth of the Pearl River, while signs were placed and rumours spread by the Qing that they had poisoned the freshwater springs traditionally used to restock foreign merchant ships. On 23 August a ship belonging to a prominent opium merchant was attacked by lascar pirates while travelling downriver from Guangzhou to Macau. Rumors spread among the British that it had been Chinese soldiers who had attacked the ship, and Elliot ordered all British ships to leave the coast of China by 24 August. That same day Macau barred British ships from its harbour at the request of Lin. The commissioner travelled in person to the city, where he was welcomed by some of the inhabitants as a hero who had restored law and order. The flight from Macau ensured that by the end of August over 60 British ships and over 2000 people were idling off of the Chinese coast, fast running out of provisions. On 30 August HMS Volage arrived to defend the fleet from a potential Chinese attack, and Elliot warned Qing authorities in Kowloon that the embargo on food and water must be ended soon.

Early on 4 September Elliot dispatched an armed schooner and a cutter to Kowloon to buy provisions from Chinese peasants. The two ships approached three Chinese war junks in the harbour and requested permission to land men in order to procure supplies. The British were allowed through and basic necessities were provided to the British by Chinese sailors, but the Chinese commander inside Kowloon fort refused to allow the locals to trade with the British and confined the townspeople inside the settlement. The situation grew more intense as the day went on, and in the afternoon Elliot issued an ultimatum that, if the Chinese refused to allow the British to purchase supplies, they would be fired upon. A 3:00 pm deadline set by Elliot passed and the British ships opened fire on the Chinese vessels. The junks returned fire, and Chinese gunners on land began to fire at the British ships. Nightfall ended the battle, and the Chinese junks withdrew, ending what would be known as the Battle of Kowloon. Many British officers wanted to launch a land attack on Kowloon fort the next day, but Elliot decided against it, stating that such an action would cause "great injury and irritation" to the town's inhabitants. After the skirmish, Elliot circulated a paper in Kowloon, reading;

The men of the English nation desire nothing but peace; but they cannot submit to be poisoned and starved. The Imperial cruisers they have no wish to molest or impede; but they must not prevent the people from selling. To deprive men of food is the act only of the unfriendly and hostile.

Having driven off the Chinese ships, the British fleet began to purchase provisions from the local villagers, often with the aid of bribed Chinese officials in Kowloon. Lai Enjue, the local commander at Kowloon, declared that a victory had been won against the British. He claimed that a two masted British warship had been sunk, and that 40–50 British had been killed. He also reported that the British had been unable to acquire supplies, and his reports severely understated the strength of the Royal Navy.

=== Battle of Chuenpi ===
In late October 1839, the merchant ship Thomas Coutts arrived in China and sailed to Guangzhou. Thomas Coutts's Quaker owners refused on religious grounds to deal in opium, a fact of which the Chinese authorities were aware. The ship's captain, Warner, believed Elliot had exceeded his legal authority by banning the signing of the "no opium trade" bond, and negotiated with the governor of Guangzhou. Warner hoped that all British ships not carrying opium could negotiate to legally unload their goods at Chuenpi, an island near Humen.

To prevent other British ships from following Thomas Coutts's precedent, Elliot ordered a blockade of British shipping in the Pearl River. Fighting began on 3 November 1839, when a second British ship, Royal Saxon, attempted to sail to Guangzhou. The Royal Navy ships HMS Volage and HMS Hyacinth fired warning shots at Royal Saxon. In response to this commotion, a fleet of Chinese war junks under the command of Guan Tianpei sailed out to protect Royal Saxon. The ensuing Battle of Chuenpi resulted in the destruction of 4 Chinese war junks and the withdrawal of both fleets. The Qing navy's official report on the Battle of Chuenpi claimed that the navy had protected the British merchant vessel and reported a great victory for the day. In reality, the Chinese had been out-classed by the British vessels and several Chinese ships were disabled. Elliot reported that his squadron was protecting the 29 British ships in Chuenpi, and began to prepare for the Qing reprisal. Fearing that the Chinese would reject any contacts with the British and eventually attack with fire rafts, he ordered all ships to leave Chuenpi and head for Causeway Bay, 20 miles (30 km) from Macau, hoping that offshore anchorages would be out of range of Lin. Elliot asked Adrião Acácio da Silveira Pinto, the Portuguese governor of Macau, to let British ships load and unload their goods there in exchange for paying rents and any duties. The governor refused for fear that the Chinese would discontinue supplying food and other necessities to Macau, and on 14 January 1840 the Daoguang Emperor asked all foreign merchants in China to halt material assistance to the British.

=== Reaction in Britain ===
==== Parliamentary debates ====
Following the Chinese crackdown on the opium trade, discussion arose as to how the British government would respond, since many in Britain and the United States had criticized the trade and London's support for it. The East India and China Association of London argued that the opium trade was directly or indirectly sanctioned by the government, and as such they should compensate them for their losses. Elliot signed certificates guaranteeing payment for the surrendered opium with the assumption that China would pay for it. This provided legal basis for the merchants to demand an indemnity from the British government, which they could either force China to pay or pay for it from the British treasury. As the government had no funds to pay such indemnities, they favoured forcing China to pay since Elliot had provided them with plausible justification for a China Expedition. Many British citizens sympathised with the Chinese and wanted to halt the sale of opium, while others wanted to contain or regulate the international narcotics trade. However, a great deal of anger was expressed over the treatment of British diplomats and towards the protectionist trading policies of Qing China. The Whig controlled government in particular advocated war with China, and the pro-Whig press printed stories about Chinese "despotism and cruelty". This line of reasoning was primary defence for war with China. Since August 1839, reports had been published in London newspapers about troubles at Guangzhou and the impending war with China. The Queen's Annual Address to the House of Lords on 16 January 1840 expressed the concern that "Events have happened in China which have occasioned an interruption of the commercial intercourse of my subjects with that country. I have given, and shall continue to give, the most serious attention to a matter so deeply affecting the interests of my subjects and the dignity of my Crown."

The Whig Melbourne Government was then in a weak political situation. It barely survived a motion of non-confidence on 31 January 1840 by a majority of 21. The Tories saw the China Question as an opportunity to beat the Government, and James Graham moved a motion on 7 April 1840 in the House of Commons, censuring the Government's "want of foresight and precaution" and "their neglect to furnish the superintendent at Guangzhou with powers and instructions" to deal with the opium trade. This was a deliberate move of the Tories to avoid the sensitive issues of war and opium trade and to obtain maximum support for the motion within the party. Calls for military action were met with mixed responses when the matter went before Parliament. Foreign Secretary Palmerston, a politician known for his aggressive foreign policy and advocacy for free trade, led the pro war camp. Palmerston strongly believed that the destroyed opium should be considered property, not contraband, and as such reparations had to be made for its destruction. He justified military action by saying that no one could "say that he honestly believed the motive of the Chinese Government to have been the promotion of moral habits" and that the war was being fought to stem China's balance of payments deficit. After consulting with William Jardine, the foreign secretary drafted a letter to Prime Minister William Melbourne calling for a military response. Other merchants called for an opening of free trade with China, and it was commonly cited that the Chinese consumers were the driving factor of the opium trade. The periodic expulsion of British merchants from Guangzhou and the refusal of the Qing government to treat Britain as a diplomatic equal were seen as a slight to national pride.

Few Tory or liberal politicians supported the war. Sir James Graham, Lord Phillip Stanhope, and William Ewart Gladstone headed the anti-war faction in Britain, and denounced the ethics of the opium trade. After three days of debate, the vote was taken on Graham's motion on 9 April 1840, which was defeated by a majority of only 9 votes (262 votes for vs 271 votes against ). The Tories in the House of Commons thus failed to deter the Government from proceeding with the war and stop the British warships already on their way to China. The House of Commons agreed on 27 July 1840 to a resolution of granting £173,442 for the expenses of the expedition to China, long after the war with China had broken out.

==== Cabinet Decision and Palmerston letters ====
Under strong pressure and lobbying from various trade and manufacturer associations, the Whig cabinet under Prime Minister Melbourne decided on 1 October 1839 to send an expedition to China. War preparations then began.

In early November 1839, Palmerston instructed Auckland, Governor General of India, to prepare military forces for deployment in China. On 20 February 1840 Palmerston (who remained unaware of the First Battle of Chuenpi in November 1839) drafted two letters detailing the British response to the situation in China. One letter was addressed to the Elliots, the other to the Daoguang Emperor and the Qing government. The letter to the emperor informed China that Great Britain had sent a military expeditionary force to the Chinese coast. In the letter, Palmerston stated that,

These measures of hostility on the part of Great Britain against China are not only justified, but even rendered absolutely necessary, by the outrages which have been committed by the Chinese Authorities against British officers and Subjects, and these hostilities will not cease, until a satisfactory arrangement shall have been made by the Chinese Government.

In his letter to the Elliots, Palmerston instructed the commanders to set up a blockade of the Pearl River and forward to a Chinese official the letter from Palmerston addressing the Chinese emperor. They were to then capture the Zhoushan Islands, blockade the mouth of the Yangtze River, start negotiations with Qing officials, and finally sail the fleet into the Bohai Sea, where they would send another copy of the aforementioned letter to Beijing. Palmerston also issued a list of objectives that the British government wanted accomplished, with said objectives being:

- Demand to be treated with the respect due to a royal envoy by the Qing authorities.
- Secure the right of the British superintendent to administer justice to British subjects in China.
- Seek recompense for destroyed British property.
- Gain most favoured trading status with the Chinese government.
- Request the right for foreigners to safely inhabit and own private property in China.
- Ensure that, if contraband is seized in accordance with Chinese law, no harm comes to the person(s) of British subjects carrying illicit goods in China.
- End the system by which British merchants are restricted to trading solely in Guangzhou.
- Ask that the cities of Guangzhou, Amoy, Shanghai, Ningbo, and the province of northern Formosa be freely opened to trade from all foreign powers.
- Secure islands along the Chinese coast that can be easily defended and provisioned, or exchange captured islands for favourable trading terms.

Lord Palmerston left it to Superintendent Elliot's discretion as to how these objectives would be fulfilled, but noted that while negotiation would be a preferable outcome, he did not trust that diplomacy would succeed, writing;

To sum up in a few words the result of this Instruction, you will see, from what I have stated, that the British Government demands from that of China satisfaction for the past and security for the future; and does not choose to trust to negotiation for obtaining either of these things; but has sent out a Naval and Military Force with orders to begin at once to take the Measures necessary for attaining the object in view.

== War ==
=== Opening moves ===
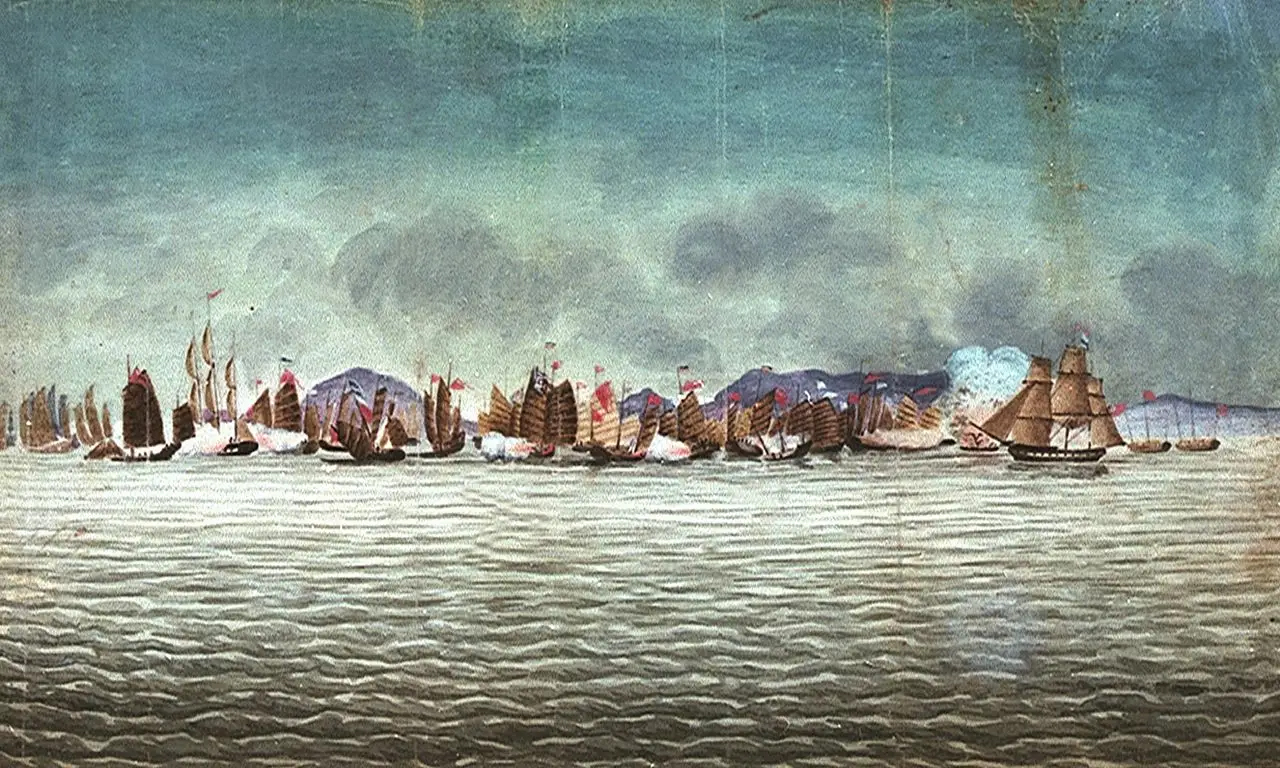
Engagement between British and Chinese ships in the First Battle of Chuenpi, 1839.

The Chinese naval forces in Guangzhou were under the command of Admiral Guan Tianpei, who had fought the British at Chuenpi. The Qing southern army and garrisons were under the command of General Yang Fang. Overall command was invested in the Daoguang Emperor and his court. The Chinese government initially believed that, as in the 1834 Napier Affair, the British had been successfully expelled. Few preparations were made for a British reprisal, and the events leading to the eventual outbreak of the Sino-Sikh War in 1841 were seen as a greater cause for concern.

Left without a major base of operations in China, the British withdrew their merchant shipping from the region while maintaining the Royal Navy's China squadron in the islands around the mouth of the Pearl River. From London, Palmerston continued to dictate operations in China, ordering the East India Company to divert troops from India in preparation for a limited war against the Chinese. It was decided that the war would not be fought as a full-scale conflict, but rather as a punitive expedition. Superintendent Elliot remained in charge of Britain's interests in China, while Commodore Gordon Bremer led the Royal Marines and the China Squadron. Major General Hugh Gough was selected to command the British land forces, and was promoted to overall commander of British forces in China. The cost of the war would be paid by the British Government. Per Lord Palmerston's letter, plans were drawn up by the British to launch a series of attacks on Chinese ports and rivers.

British plans to form an expeditionary force were started immediately after the January 1840 vote. Several infantry regiments were raised in the British isles, and the completion of ships already under construction was expedited. To conduct the upcoming war, Britain also began to draw on forces from its overseas empire. British India had been preparing for a war since word had arrived that the opium had been destroyed, and several regiments of Bengali volunteers had been recruited to supplement the regular British Indian Army and East India Company forces. In terms of naval forces, the ships earmarked for the expedition were either posted in remote colonies or under repair, and Oriental Crisis of 1840 (and the resulting risk of war between Britain, France, and the Ottoman Empire over Syria) drew the attention of the Royal Navy's European fleets away from China. Orders were dispatched to British South Africa and Australia to send ships to Singapore, the assigned rendezvous point for the expedition. A number of steamers were purchased by the Royal Navy and attached to the expedition as transports. The unseasonable summer weather of India and the Strait of Malacca slowed the British deployment, and a number of accidents decreased the combat readiness of the expedition. Most notably, both of the 74-gun ships of the line that the Royal Navy intended to use against Chinese fortifications were temporarily put out of action by hull damage. Despite these delays, by mid-June 1840 British forces had begun to assemble in Singapore. While they waited for more ships to arrive, the Royal Marines practised amphibious invasions on the beach, first by landing ashore in boats, then forming lines and advancing on mock fortifications.

=== British offensive begins ===
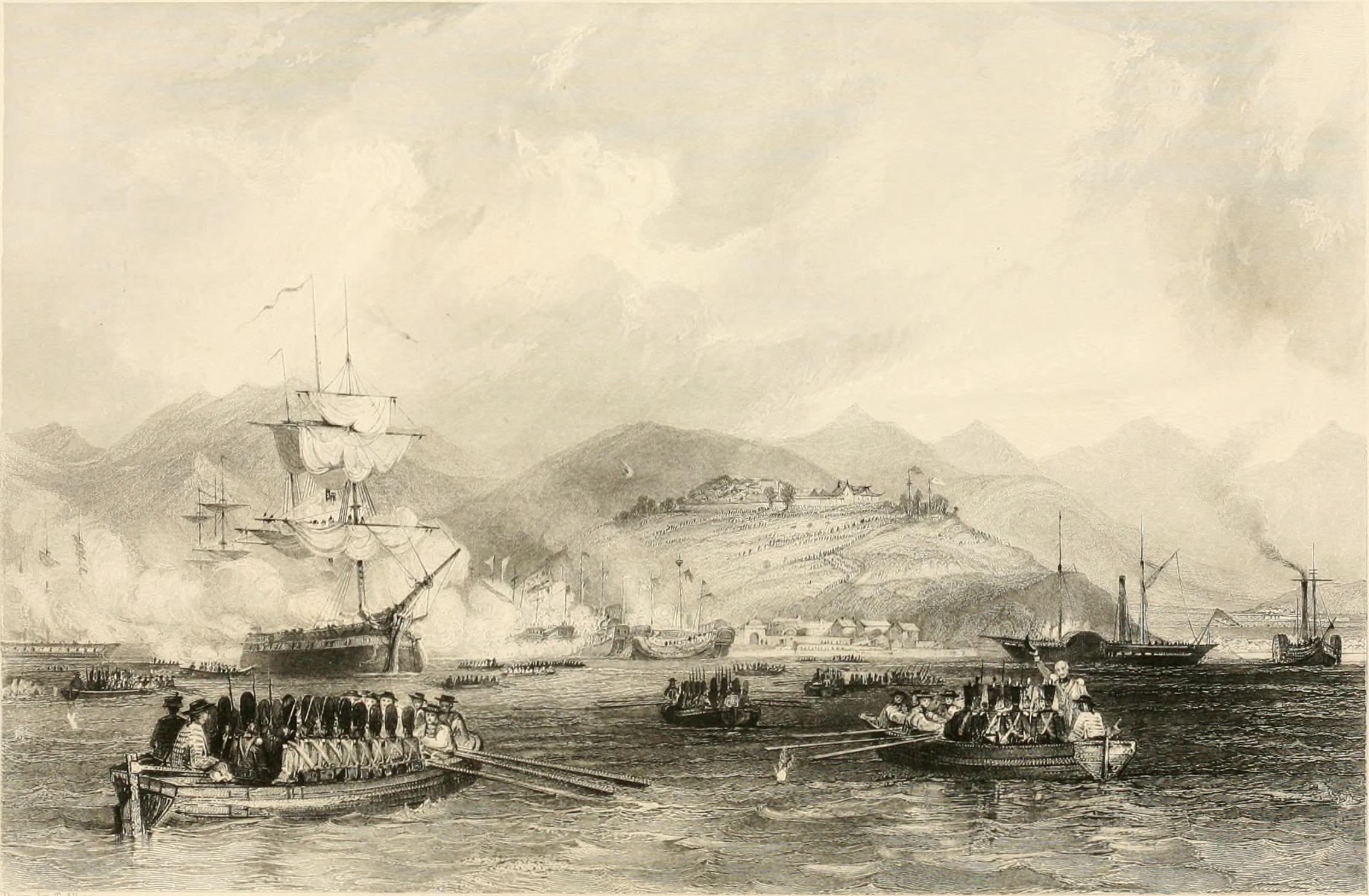
Capture of Chusan, July 1840

In late June 1840 the first part of the expeditionary force arrived in China aboard 15 barracks ships, four steam-powered gunboats and 25 smaller boats. The flotilla was under the command of Commodore Bremer. The British issued an ultimatum demanding the Qing Government pay compensation for losses suffered from interrupted trade and the destruction of opium, but were rebuffed by the Qing authorities in Guangzhou.

In his letters, Palmerston had instructed the joint plenipotentiaries Elliot and his cousin Admiral George Elliot to acquire the cession of at least one island for trade on the Chinese coast. With the British expeditionary force now in place, a combined naval and ground assault was launched on the Zhoushan (Chusan) Archipelago. Zhoushan Island, the largest and best defended of the islands was the primary target for the attack, as was its vital port of Dinghai. When the British fleet arrived off Zhoushan, Elliot demanded the city surrender. The commander of the Chinese garrison refused the command, stating that he could not surrender and questioning what reason the British had for harassing Dinghai, as they had been driven out of Guangzhou. Fighting began, a fleet of 12 small junks was destroyed by the Royal Navy, and British marines captured the hills to the south of Dinghai.

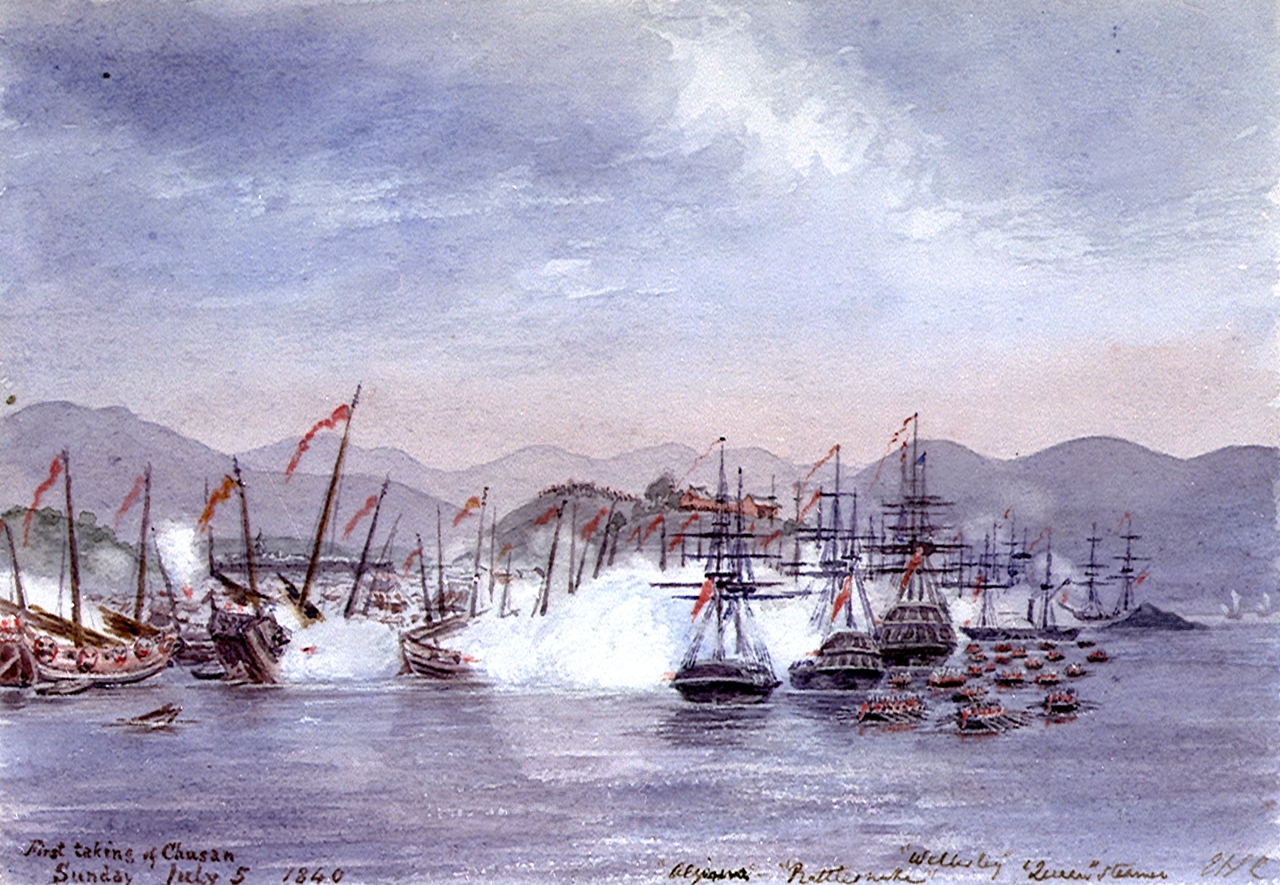
The Battle of Chusan

The British captured the city itself after an intense naval bombardment on 5 July forced the surviving Chinese defenders to withdraw. The British occupied Dinghai harbour and prepared to use it as a staging point for operations in China. In the fall of 1840 disease broke out in the Dinghai garrison, forcing the British to evacuate soldiers to Manila and Kolkata. By the beginning of 1841 only 1900 of the 3300 men who had originally occupied Dinghai were left, with many of those remaining incapable of fighting. An estimated 500 British soldiers died from disease, with the Cameron and Bengali volunteers suffering the most deaths, while the Royal Marines were relatively unscathed.

Having captured Dinghai, the British expedition divided its forces, sending one fleet south to the Pearl River while sending a second fleet north to the Yellow Sea. The northern fleet sailed to the Hai River, where Elliot personally presented Palmerston's letter to the emperor to Qing authorities from the capital. Qishan, a high-ranking Manchu official, was selected by the Imperial Court to replace Lin as the Viceroy of Liangguang after the latter was discharged for his failure to resolve the opium situation. Negotiations began between the two sides, with Qishan serving as the primary negotiator for the Qing and Elliot serving as the representative for the British Crown. After a week of negotiations, Qishan and Elliot agreed to relocate to the Pearl River for further negotiations. In return for the courtesy of the British to withdraw from the Yellow Sea, Qishan promised to requisition imperial funds as restitution for British merchants who had suffered damages. The war, however, was not concluded and both sides continued to engage each other. In the late spring of 1841 reinforcements arrived from India in preparation for an offensive against Guangzhou. A flotilla of transports brought 600 men of the professionally trained 37th Madras Native Infantry to Dinghai, where their arrival boosted British morale. Accompanying the fleet as far as Macau was the newly constructed iron steamer HEICS Nemesis, a weapon to which the Chinese navy had no effective counter. On 19 August three British warships and 380 marines drove the Chinese from the land bridge (known as "The Barrier") separating Macau from mainland China. The defeat of the Qing soldiers coupled with the arrival of the Nemesis in Macau's harbour resulted in a wave of pro-British support in the city, and several Qing officials were driven out or killed. Portugal remained neutral in the conflict, but after the battle was willing to allow British ships to dock in Macau, a decision that granted the British a functioning port in Southern China. With the strategic harbours of Dinghai and Macau secured, the British began to focus on the war on the Pearl River. Five months after the British victory at Chusan, the northern elements of the expedition sailed south to Humen, known to the British as The Bogue. Bremer judged that gaining control of the Pearl River and Guangzhou would put the British in a strong negotiating position with the Qing authorities, as well as allow for the renewal of trade when the war ended.

=== Pearl River campaign ===
While the British campaigned in the north, Qing Admiral Guan Tianpei greatly reinforced the Qing positions in Humen (Bocca Tigris), suspecting that the British would attempt to force their way up the Pearl River to Guangzhou; sources state that Guan had been preparing for an eventual attack on the position since Napier's attack in 1835. The Humen forts blocked transit of the river, and were garrisoned with 3000 men and 306 cannons. By the time the British fleet was ready for action, 10,000 Qing soldiers were in position to defend Guangzhou and the surrounding area. The British fleet arrived in early January, and began to bombard the Qing defences at Chuenpi after a group of Chinese fire-rafts were sent drifting towards the Royal navy ships.

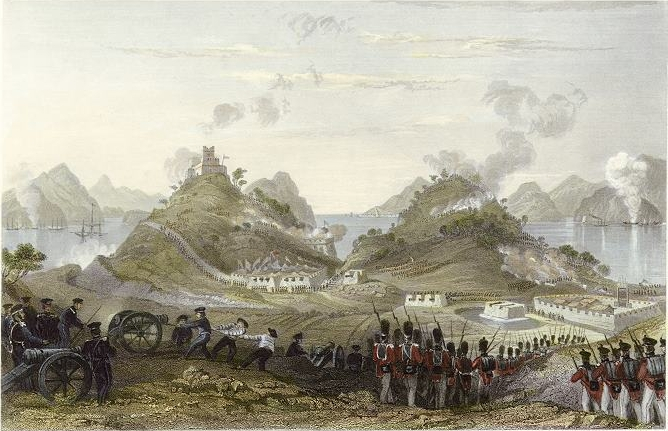
The Second Battle of Chuenpi

On 7 January 1841, the British won a decisive victory in the Second Battle of Chuenpi, destroying 11 Junks of the Chinese southern fleet and capturing the Humen forts. The victory allowed the British to set up a blockade of The Bogue, a blow that forced the Qing navy to retreat upriver.

Knowing the strategic value of Pearl River Delta to China and aware that British naval superiority made a reconquest of the region unlikely, Qishan attempted to prevent the war from widening further by negotiating a peace treaty with Britain. On 21 January Qishan and Elliot drafted the Convention of Chuenpi, a document which both parties hoped would end the war. The convention would establish equal diplomatic rights between Britain and China, exchange Hong Kong Island for Zhoushan, facilitate the release of shipwrecked and kidnapped British citizens held by the Chinese, and reopen trade in Guangzhou by 1 February 1841. China would also pay six million silver dollars as recompense for the opium destroyed at Humen in 1838. However, the legal status of the opium trade was not resolved and instead left open to be discussed at a future date. Despite the success of the negotiations between Qishan and Elliot, both of their respective governments refused to sign the convention. The Daoguang Emperor was infuriated that Qing territory would be given up in a treaty that had been signed without his permission, and ordered Qishan arrested (he was later sentenced to death; the sentence was then commuted to military service.) Lord Palmerston recalled Elliot from his post and refused to sign the convention, wanting more concessions to be forced from the Chinese per his original instructions.

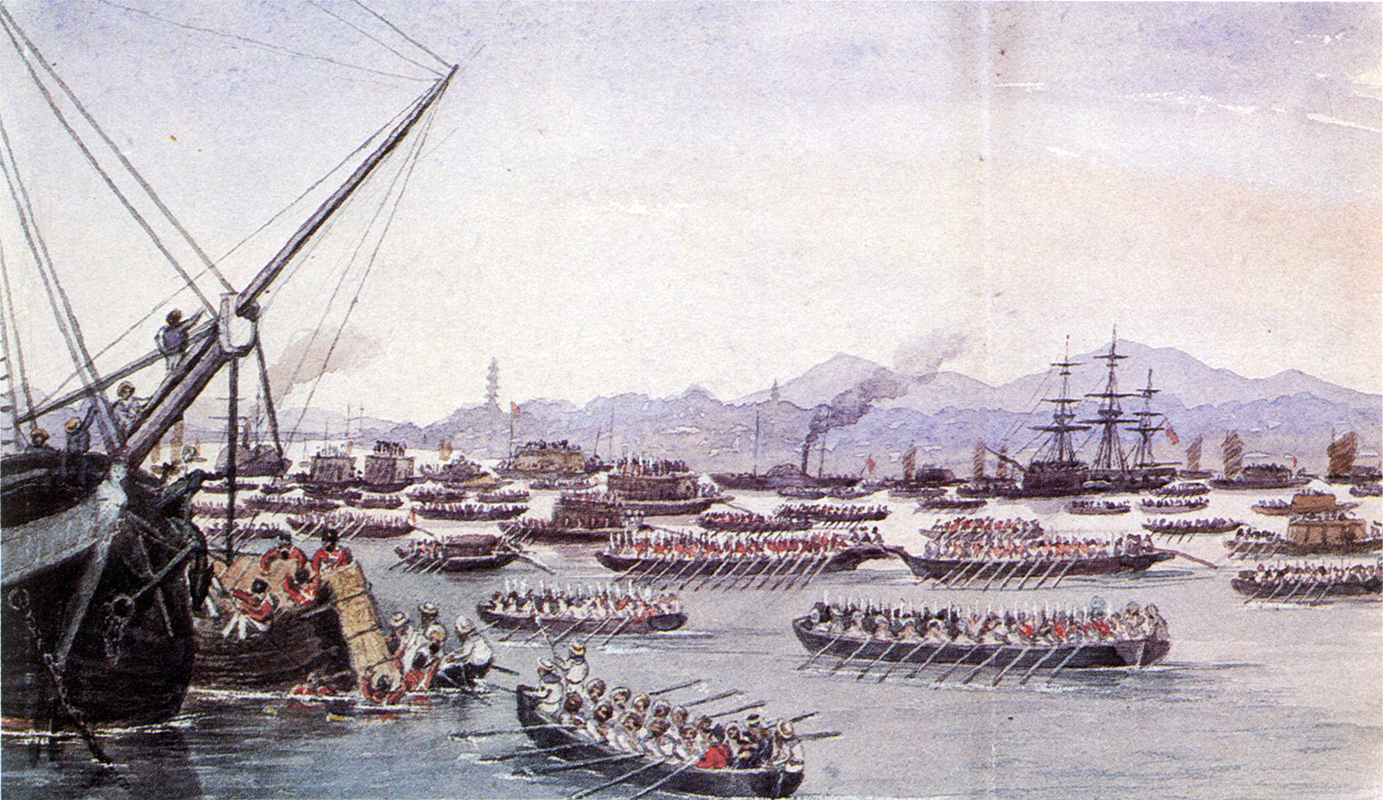
British ships approaching Guangzhou in May 1841

The brief interlude in the fighting ended in the beginning of February after the Chinese refused to reopen Guangzhou to British trade. On 19 February a longboat from Nemesis came under fire from a fort on North Wangtong Island, prompting a British response. The British commanders ordered another blockade of the Pearl River and resumed combat operations against the Chinese. The British captured the remaining Bogue forts on 26 February during the Battle of the Bogue and the Battle of First Bar on the following day, allowing the fleet to move further upriver towards Guangzhou. Admiral Tianpei was killed in action during the fighting on 26 February. On 2 March the British destroyed a Qing fort near Pazhou and captured Whampoa, an action that directly threatened Guangzhou's east flank. Major General Gough, who had recently arrived from Madras aboard HMS Cruizer, personally directed the attack on Whampoa. Superintendent Elliot (who was unaware that he had been dismissed), and the Governor-General of Guangzhou declared a 3-day truce on 3 March. Between the 3rd and the 6th the British forces that had evacuated Zhoushan per the Convention of Chuenpi arrived in the Pearl River. The Chinese military was likewise reinforced, and by 16 March General Yang Fang commanded 30,000 men in the area surrounding Guangzhou.

While the main British fleet prepared to sail up the Pearl River to Guangzhou, a group of three warships departed for the Xi River estuary, intending to navigate the waterway between Macau and Guangzhou. The fleet, led by Captain James Scott and Superintendent Elliot, was composed of the frigate HMS Samarang and the steamships HEIC ship Nemesis and HMS Atalanta. Although the waterway was in places only 6 feet deep, the shallow drafts of the steamships allowed the British to approach Guangzhou from a direction the Qing believed to be impossible. In a series of engagements along the river from 13 to 15 March, the British captured or destroyed Chinese ships, guns, and military equipment. 9 junks, 6 fortresses, and 105 guns were destroyed or captured in what was known as the Broadway expedition.

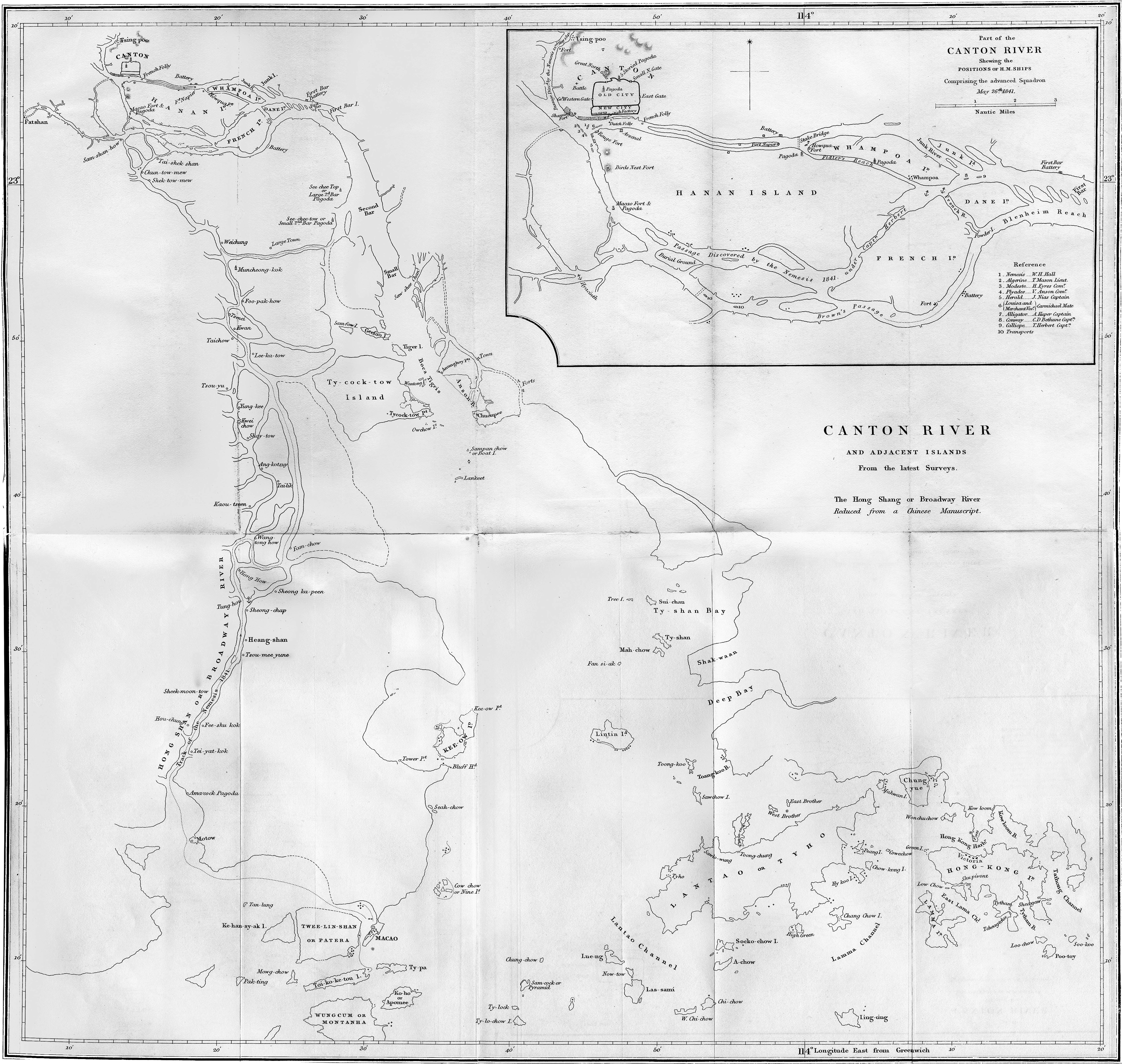
British map of the Pearl River

With the Pearl River cleared of Chinese defences, the British debated advancing on Guangzhou. Although the truce had ended on 6 March, Superintendent Elliot believed that the British should negotiate with the Qing authorities from their current position of strength rather than risk a battle in Guangzhou. The Qing army made no aggressive moves against the British and instead began to fortify the city. Chinese military engineers began to establish a number of mud earthworks on the riverbank, sank junks to create blockships on the river, and started constructing fire rafts and gunboats. Chinese merchants were ordered to remove all of the silk and tea from Guangzhou to impede trade, and the local populace was barred from selling food to the British ships on the river. On 16 March a British ship approaching a Chinese fort under a flag of truce was fired upon, leading to the British setting the fort on fire with rockets. These actions convinced Elliot that the Chinese were preparing to fight, and following the return of the ships of the Broadway expedition to the fleet, the British attacked Guangzhou on 18 March, taking the Thirteen Factories with very few casualties and raising the Union Jack above the British factory. The city was partially occupied by the British and trade was reopened after negotiation with the Cohong merchants. After several days of further military successes, British forces commanded the high ground around Guangzhou. Another truce was declared on 20 March. Against the advice of some of his captains, Elliot withdrew most of the Royal Navy warships downriver to the Bocca Tigris.

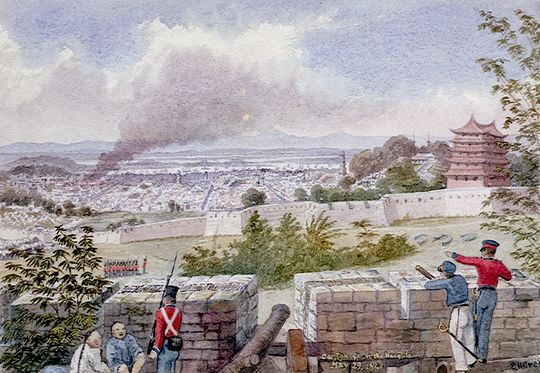
Sketch of British soldiers occupying the high ground above Guangzhou in 1841

In mid-April, Yishan (Qishan's replacement as Viceroy of Liangguang and the Daoguang Emperor's cousin) arrived in Guangzhou. He declared that trade should continue to remain open, sent emissaries to Elliot, and began to gather military assets outside Guangzhou. The Qing army camped outside of the city soon numbered 50,000, and the money earned from the reopened trade was spent repairing and expanding Guangzhou's defences. Concealed artillery batteries were built along the Pearl River, Chinese soldiers were deployed in Whampoa and the Bocca Tigris, and hundreds of small river craft were armed for war. A bulletin sent from the Daoguang Emperor commanded the Qing forces to "Exterminate the rebels at all points", and orders were given to drive the British from the Pearl River before reclaiming Hong Kong and driving the invaders out of China altogether. This order was leaked and became widely circulated in Guangzhou among foreign merchants, who were already suspicious of Chinese intentions after learning of the Qing military build-up. In May many Cohong merchants and their families left the city, raising further concerns about a renewal of hostilities. Rumours spread that Chinese divers were being trained to drill holes in the hulls of British ships, and that fleets of fire rafts were being prepared for deployment against the Royal Navy. During the build-up, the Qing army was weakened by infighting between units and lack of confidence in Yishan, who openly distrusted Cantonese civilians and soldiers, instead choosing to rely on forces drawn from other Chinese provinces. On 20 May, Yishan issued a statement, asking the "people of Canton, and all foreign merchants who are respectfully obedient, not to tremble with alarm and be frightened out of their wits at the military hosts that are gathering around, there being no probability of hostilities." The next day Elliot requested that all British merchants evacuate the city by sundown, and several warships were recalled to their positions in front of Guangzhou.

On the night of 21 May the Qing launched a coordinated night attack on the British army and navy. Artillery batteries hidden in Guangzhou and on the Pearl River (many of which the British believed they had disabled earlier) opened fire, and Qing soldiers retook the British Factory. A large formation of 200 fire rafts connected by a chain was sent drifting towards the British ships at Guangzhou, and fishing boats armed with matchlocks began to engage the Royal Navy. The British warships were able to evade the attack, and stray rafts set Guangzhou's waterfront on fire, illuminating the river and foiling the night attack. Downriver at Whampoa the Chinese attacked the British vessels at anchor there and attempted to prevent ships from reaching Guangzhou. Having suspected an attack, and as a consequence delaying his own offensive, Major General Gough consolidated the British forces at Hong Kong and ordered a rapid advance upriver to Guangzhou. These reinforcements arrived on 25 May, and the British counter-attacked, taking the last four Qing forts above Guangzhou and bombarding the city.

The Qing army fled in panic when the city heights were taken, and the British pursued them into the countryside. On 29 May a crowd of around 20,000 villagers and townspeople attacked and defeated a foraging company of 6,000 Indian sepoys in what became known as the Sanyuanli Incident, and Gough ordered a retreat back to the river. The fighting subsided on 30 May 1841, and Guangzhou came fully under British occupation. Following the capture of Guangzhou, the British command and the governor-general of Guangzhou agreed to a cease-fire in the region. Under the terms of the limited peace (later widely referred to as "The Ransom of Canton"), the British were paid to withdraw beyond the Bogue forts, an action they completed by 31 May. Elliott signed the peace treaty without consulting the British army or Navy, an act which displeased General Gough.

The defence of Guangzhou was declared a diplomatic success by Yishan. In a letter to the emperor, he wrote that the barbarians had begged "the chief general that he would implore the great emperor in their behalf, that he would have mercy upon them, and cause their debts to be repaid them, and graciously permit them to carry on their commerce, when they would immediately withdraw their ships from the Bocca Tigris, and never dare again to raise any disturbance." However, General Yang Fang was reprimanded by the emperor for his agreeing to a truce rather than forcefully resisting the British. The emperor was not informed the British expedition had not been defeated and was very much intact. The imperial court continued to debate China's next course of action for the war, as the Daoguang Emperor wanted Hong Kong retaken.

=== Central China ===
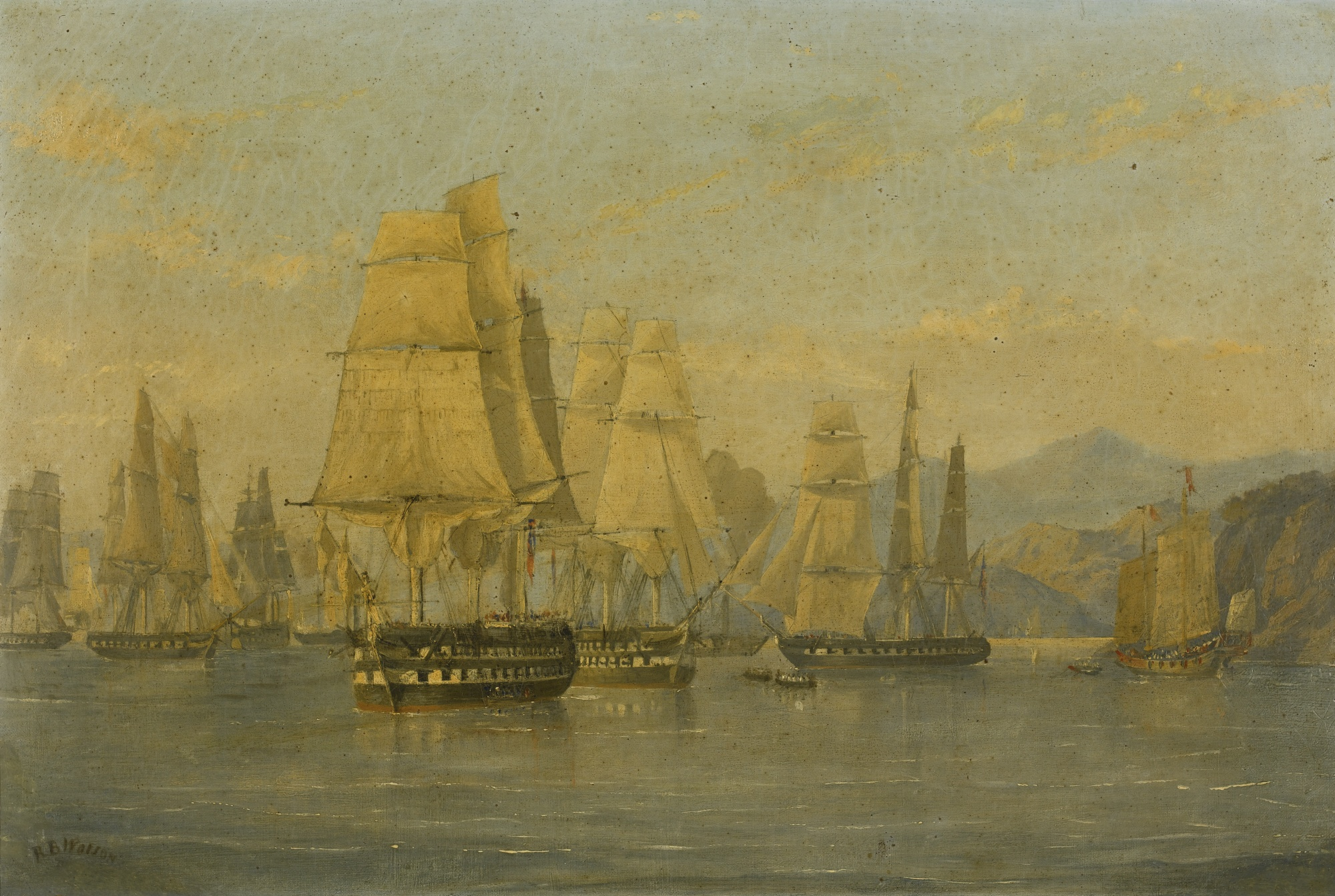
HMS Wellesley and the British squadron sailing from Hong Kong for the attack on Xiamen in 1841

Following their withdrawal from Guangzhou, the British relocated the expeditionary force to Hong Kong. Just as with the Chinese commanders, the British leaders debated how the war should be continued. Elliot wanted to cease military operations and reopen trade, while Major General Gough wanted to capture the city of Amoy and blockade the Yangtze River. In July, a typhoon struck Hong Kong, damaging British ships in the harbour and destroying some of the facilities the expedition was building on the island. The situation changed when, on 29 July, Elliot was informed that he had been replaced as Superintendent by Henry Pottinger, who arrived in Hong Kong on 10 August to begin his administration. Pottinger wanted to negotiate terms with the Qing for the entire country of China, rather than just the Pearl River, and so he turned away Chinese envoys from Guangzhou and gave permission for the expeditionary force to proceed with its war plans. Admiral William Parker, 1st Baronet of Shenstone also arrived in Hong Kong to replace Humphrey Fleming Senhouse (who had died of a fever on 29 June) as the commander of the British naval forces in China. It was agreed by the British commanders that combat operations should be moved north to put pressure on Peking, and on 21 August the fleet sailed for Amoy.

The 18th Foot storming Chinese fortifications at the Battle of Amoy

On 25 August, the British fleet entered the Jiulong River estuary and arrived at Amoy. The city was prepared for a naval assault, as Qing military engineers had built several artillery batteries into the granite cliffs overlooking the river. A purely naval assault was considered too risky by Parker, prompting Gough to order a combined naval and ground attack on the defences. On 26 August British marines and regular infantry under the covering fire of the Royal Navy flanked and destroyed the Chinese defences guarding the river. Several large British ships failed to destroy the largest of the Chinese batteries, which withstood over 12,000 cannonballs being fired at it, so the position was scaled and captured by the British infantry. The city of Amoy was abandoned on 27 August, and British soldiers entered the inner town where they blew up the citadel's powder magazine. 26 Chinese junks and 128 cannons were captured, with the captured guns being thrown into the river by the British. As Lord Palmerston wanted Amoy to become an international trade port at the end of the war, Gough ordered that no looting be tolerated and had officers enforce the death penalty for anyone found to be plundering. However, many Chinese merchants refused to ask for British protection out of fear of being branded as traitors to the Qing dynasty. The British withdrew to an island on the river, where they established a small garrison and blockaded the Jiulong River. With the city empty of any army, peasants, criminals, and deserters looted the town. The Qing army retook the city and restored order several days later, after which the city governor declared that a victory had been won and 5 British ships sunk.

In Britain, changes in Parliament resulted in Lord Palmerston being removed from his post as Foreign Minister on 30 August. William Lamb, 2nd Viscount Melbourne replaced him, and sought a more measured approach to the situation in China. Lamb remained a supporter of the war.

In September 1841, the British transport ship Nerbudda was shipwrecked on a reef off the northern coast of Formosa after a brief gunnery duel with a Chinese fort. This sinking was followed by the loss of the brig Ann on another reef in March 1842. The survivors of both ships were captured and marched to southern Taiwan, where they were imprisoned. 197 were executed by Qing authorities on 10 August 1842, while an additional 87 died from ill-treatment in captivity. This became known as the Nerbudda incident.

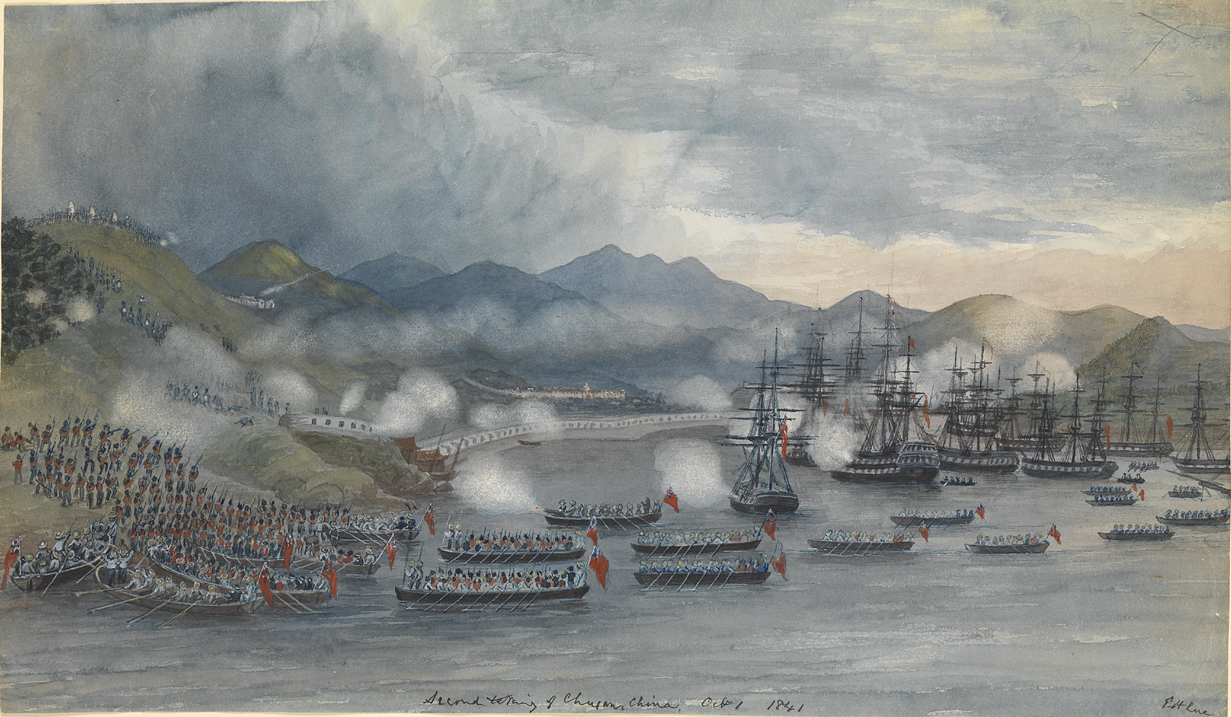
The British forces invasion and Second Capture of Chusan

October saw the British solidify their control over the central Chinese coast. Zhoushan had been exchanged for Hong Kong on the authority of Qishan in January 1841, after which the island had been re-garrisoned by the Qing. Fearing that the Chinese would improve the island's defences, the British began a military invasion. The British attacked the Qing on 1 October. The battle of the Second Capture of Chusan ensued. The British forces killed 1500 Qing soldiers and captured Zhoushan. The victory reestablished British control over Dinghai's important harbour.

On 10 October, a British naval force bombarded and captured a fort on the outskirts of Ningbo in central China. A battle broke out between the British army and a Chinese force of 1500 men on the road between the town of Chinhai and Ningbo, during which the Chinese were routed. Following the defeat, Chinese authorities evacuated Ningbo and the empty city was taken by the British on 13 October. An imperial cannon manufactory in the city was captured by the British, reducing the ability of the Qing to replace their lost equipment, and the fall of the city threatened the nearby Qiantang River. The capture of Ningbo forced the British command to examine their policy towards occupied Chinese territory and prizes of war. Admiral Parker and Superintendent Pottinger wanted a percentage of all captured Chinese property to be turned over to the British as legal prizes of war, while General Gough argued that this would only turn the Chinese population against the British, and that if property had to be seized, it should be public property rather than private. British policy eventually settled that 10% of all property captured by the British expeditionary forces would be seized as war loot in retaliation for injustices done to British merchants. Gough later stated that this edict would compel his men to "punish one set of robbers for the benefit of another."

Fighting ceased for the winter of 1841 while the British resupplied. False reports sent by Yishan to the emperor in Beijing resulted in the continued British threat being downplayed. In late 1841 the Daoguang Emperor discovered that his officials in Guangzhou and Amoy had been sending him embellished reports. He ordered the governor of Guangxi, Liang Chang-chü, to send him clear accounts of the events in Guangzhou, noting that since Guangxi was a neighbouring province, Liang must be receiving independent accounts. He warned Liang that he would be able to verify his information by obtaining secret inquiries from other places. Yishan was recalled to the capital and faced trial by the imperial court, which removed him from command. Now aware of the severity of the British threat, Chinese towns and cities began to fortify against naval incursions.

In the spring of 1842 the Daoguang Emperor ordered his cousin Yijing to retake the city of Ningbo. In the ensuing Battle of Ningpo on 10 March, the British garrison repelled the assault with rifle fire and naval artillery. At Ningbo the British lured the Qing army into the city streets before opening fire, resulting in heavy Chinese casualties. The British pursued the retreating Chinese army, capturing the nearby city of Cixi on 15 March.

The important harbour of Zhapu was captured on 18 May in the Battle of Chapu. A British fleet bombarded the town, forcing its surrender. A holdout of 300 soldiers of the Eight Banners stalled the advance of British army for several hours, an act of heroism that was commended by Gough.

=== Yangtze campaign ===
With many Chinese ports now blockaded or under British occupation, Major General Gough sought to cripple the finances of the Qing Empire by striking up the Yangtze River. 25 warships and 10,000 men were assembled at Ningbo and Zhapu in May for a planned advance into the Chinese interior. The expedition's advance ships sailed up the Yangtze, and captured the emperor's tax barges, a devastating blow that slashed the revenue of the imperial court in Beijing to a fraction of what it had been.

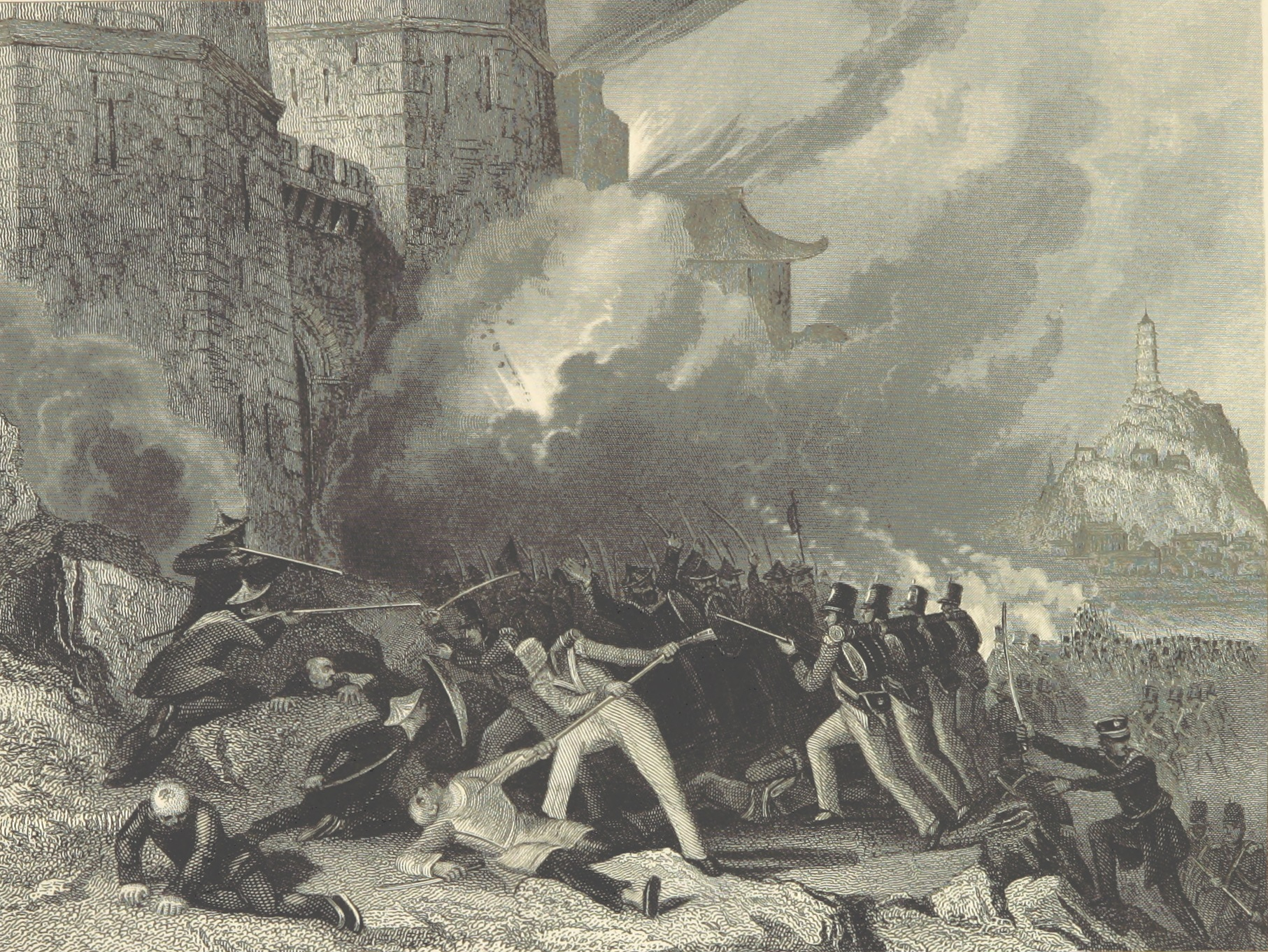
British troops capture Zhenjiang in the last major battle of the war, 21 July 1842

On 14 June, the mouth of the Huangpu River was captured by the British fleet. On 16 June, the Battle of Woosung occurred, after which the British captured the towns of Wusong and Baoshan. The undefended outskirts of Shanghai were occupied by the British on 19 June. Following the battle, Shanghai was looted by retreating Qing bannermen, British soldiers, and local civilians. Qing admiral Chen Huacheng was killed while defending a fort in Woosong.

The fall of Shanghai left the vital city of Nanjing vulnerable. The Qing amassed an army of 56,000 Manchu bannermen and Han Green Standards to defend Liangjiang Province, and strengthened their river defences on the Yangtze. However, British naval activity in Northern China led to resources and manpower being withdrawn to defend against a feared attack on Beijing. The Qing commander in Liangjiang Province released 16 British prisoners with the hope that a ceasefire could be reached, but poor communications led both the Qing and the British to reject any overtures at peace. In secret, the Daoguang Emperor considered signing a peace treaty with the British, but only in regards to the Yangtze River and not the war as a whole. Had it been signed, the British forces would have been paid to not enter the Yangtze River.

On 14 July, the British fleet on the Yangtze began to sail up the river. Reconnaissance alerted Gough to the logistical importance of the city of Zhenjiang, and plans were made to capture it. Most of the city's guns had been relocated to Wusong and had been captured by the British when said city had been taken. The Qing commanders inside the city were disorganised, with Chinese sources stating that over 100 traitors were executed in Zhenjiang prior to the battle. The British fleet arrived off of the city on the morning of 21 July, and the Chinese forts defending the city were blasted apart. The Chinese defenders initially retreated into the surrounding hills, causing a premature British landing. Fighting erupted when thousands of Chinese soldiers emerged from the city, beginning the Battle of Chinkiang.

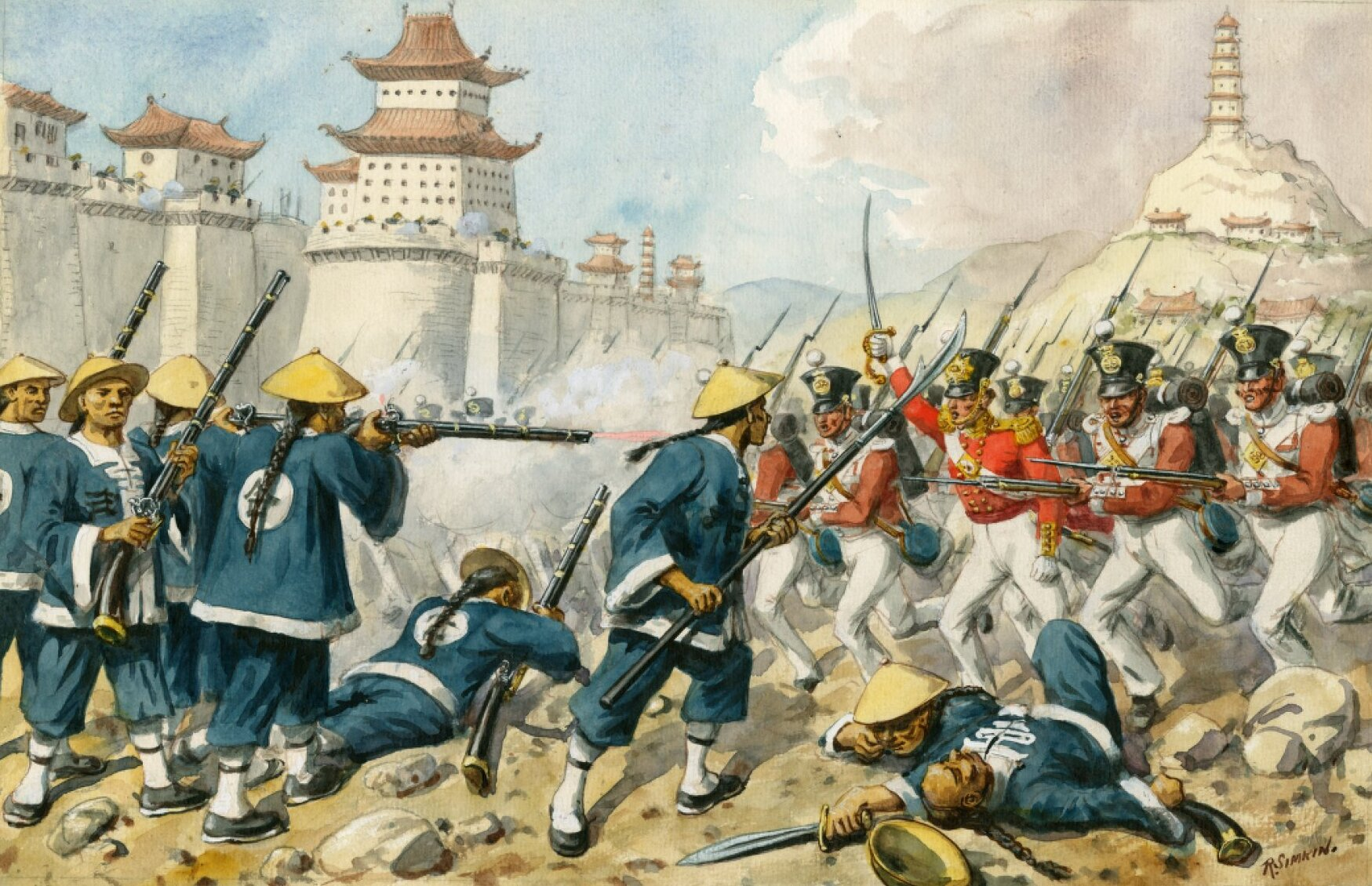
The Battle of Chinkiang

British engineers blew open the western gate and stormed into the city, where fierce street to street fighting ensued. Zhenjiang was devastated by the battle, with many Chinese soldiers and their families committing suicide rather than be taken prisoner. The British suffered their highest combat losses of the war (36 killed) taking the city.

After capturing Zhenjiang, the British fleet cut the vital Grand Canal, paralysing the Caoyun system and severely disrupting the Chinese ability to distribute grain throughout the Empire. The British departed Zhenjiang on 3 August, intending to sail to Nanking. They arrived outside the Jiangning District on 9 August, and were in position to assault the city by 11 August. Although explicit permission to negotiate had not yet been granted by the emperor, Qing officials inside the city agreed to a British request to negotiate.

=== Treaty of Nanking ===
On 14 August a Chinese delegation led by the Manchu high court official Keying and Llipu departed Nanking for the British fleet. Negotiations lasted for several weeks as the British delegation insisted the treaty be accepted by the Daoguang Emperor. The court advised the emperor to accept the treaty, and on 21 August the Daoguang Emperor authorised his diplomats to sign the peace treaty with the British. The First Opium war officially ended on 29 August 1842 with the signing of the Treaty of Nanking. The document was signed by officials of the British and Qing empires aboard HMS Cornwallis.

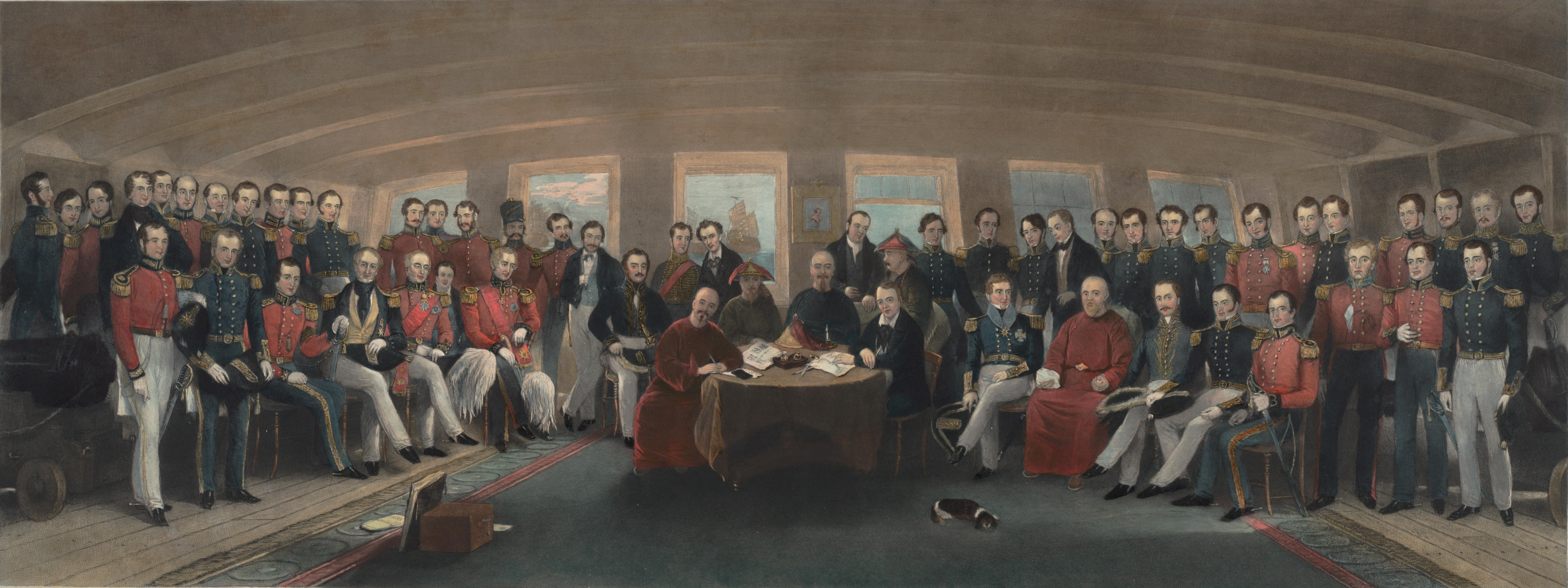
Oil painting depicting the signing of the Treaty of Nanking.

=== Technology and tactics ===
==== British ====
The British military superiority during the conflict drew heavily on the strength of the Royal Navy.

British warships carried more guns than their Chinese opponents and were manoeuvrable enough to evade Chinese boarding actions. Steam ships such as the Nemesis were able to move against winds and tides in Chinese rivers, and were armed with heavy guns and Congreve rockets. Several of the larger British warships in China (notably the third-rates HMS Cornwallis, HMS Wellesley, and HMS Melville) carried more guns than entire fleets of Chinese junks. British naval superiority allowed the Royal Navy to attack Chinese forts with very little risk to themselves, as British naval cannons out-ranged the vast majority of the Qing artillery.

British soldiers in China were equipped with Brunswick rifles and rifle-modified Brown Bess muskets, both of which possessed an effective firing range of 200–300 metres. British marines were equipped with percussion caps that greatly reduced weapon misfires and allowed firearms to be used in damp environments. In terms of gunpowder, the British formula was better manufactured and contained more sulphur than the Chinese mixture. This granted British weapons an advantage in terms of range, accuracy and projectile velocity. British artillery was lighter (owing to improved forging methods) and more manoeuvrable than the cannons used by the Chinese. As with the naval artillery, British guns out-ranged the Chinese cannon.

In terms of tactics, the British forces in China followed doctrines established during the Napoleonic Wars that had been adapted during the various colonial wars of the 1820s and 1830s. Many of the British soldiers deployed to China were veterans of colonial wars in India and had experience fighting larger but technologically inferior armies. In battle, the British line infantry would advance towards the enemy in columns, forming ranks once they had closed to firing range. Companies would commence firing volleys into the enemy ranks until they retreated. If a position needed to be taken, an advance or charge with bayonets would be ordered. Light infantry companies screened the line infantry formations, protecting their flanks and utilising skirmishing tactics to disrupt the enemy. British artillery was used to destroy the Qing artillery and break up enemy formations. During the conflict, the British superiority in range, rate of fire, and accuracy allowed the infantry to deal significant damage to their enemy before the Chinese could return fire. The use of naval artillery to support infantry operations allowed the British to take cities and forts with minimal casualties.

The overall strategy of the British during the war was to inhibit the finances of the Qing Empire, with the ultimate goal of acquiring a colonial possession on the Chinese coast. This was accomplished through the capture of Chinese cities and by blockading major river systems. Once a fort or city had been captured, the British would destroy the local arsenal and disable all of the captured guns. They would then move on to the next target, leaving a small garrison behind. This strategy was planned and implemented by Major General Gough, who was able to operate with minimal input from the British government after Superintendent Elliot was recalled in 1841. The large number of private British merchants and East India Company ships deployed in Singapore and the India colonies ensured that the British forces in China were adequately supplied.

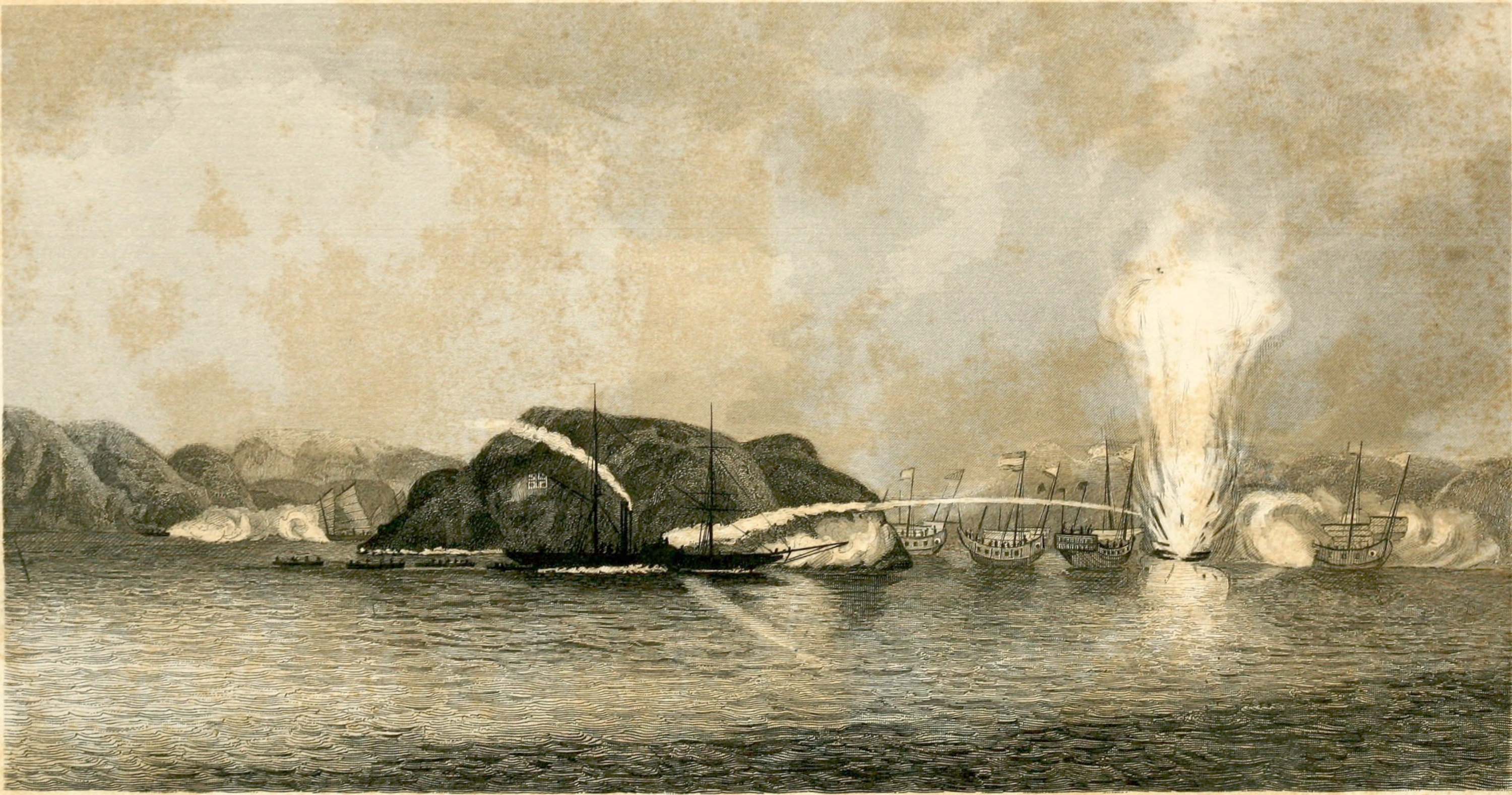
A Royal Navy steamship destroying a Chinese junk with a Congreve rocket. Lightly armoured Chinese warships were decimated by heavy guns and explosive weaponry.

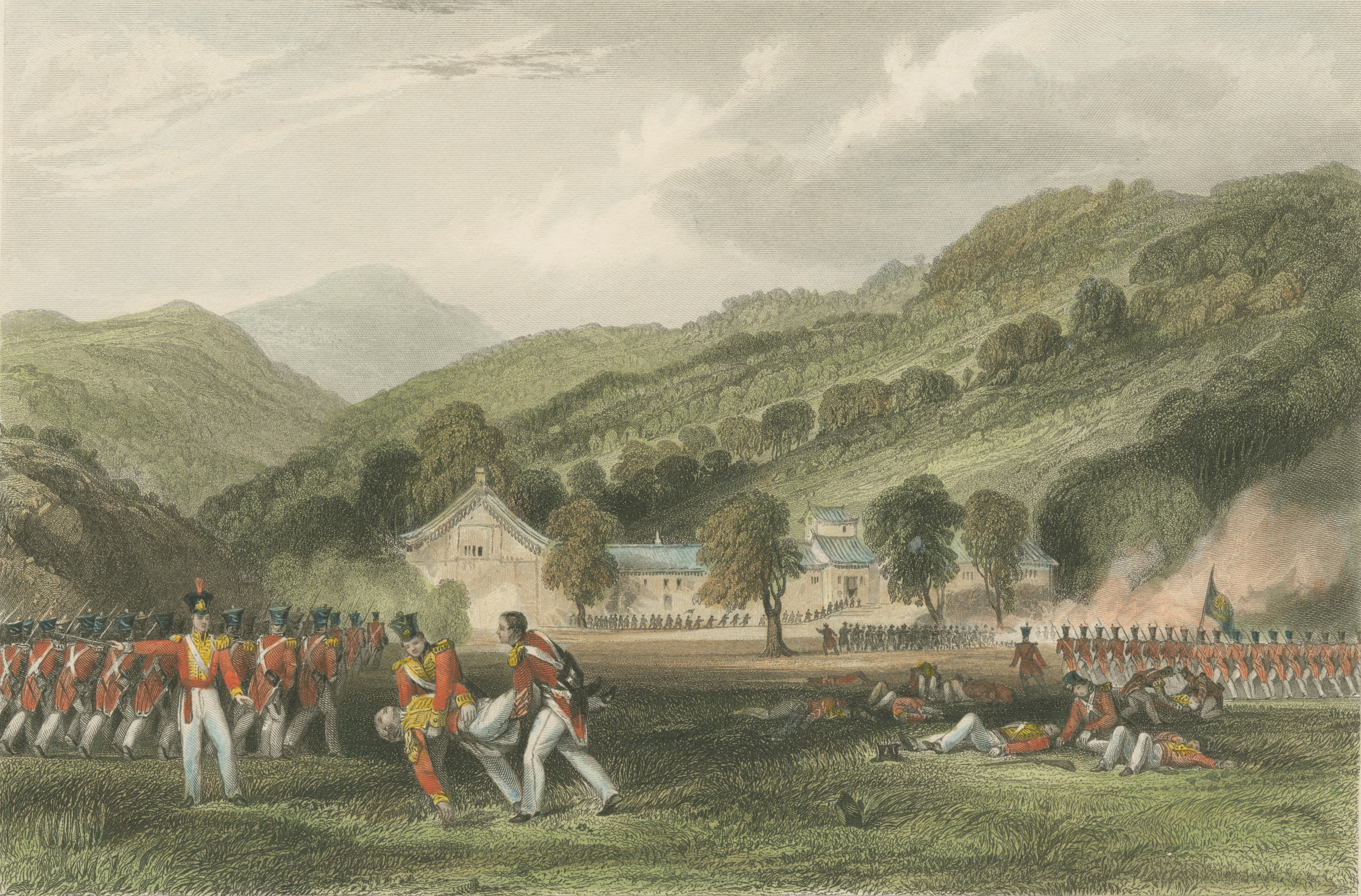
British line infantry advancing on a Chinese position in Zhapu

==== Qing dynasty ====
China did not have a unified navy, instead allowing individual provinces to manage naval defenses. Although the Qing had invested in naval defences for their adjacent seas in earlier periods, after the death of the Qianlong Emperor in 1799, the navy decayed as more attention was directed to suppressing the Miao Rebellion and White Lotus Rebellion. These conflicts left the Qing treasury bankrupt. The remaining naval forces were badly overstretched, undermanned, underfunded and uncoordinated.

From the onset of the war, the Chinese navy was severely disadvantaged. Chinese war junks were intended for use against pirates or equivalent types of vessels, and were more effective in close range river engagements. Due to their ships' slow speeds, Qing captains consistently found themselves sailing towards much more manoeuvrable British ships, and as a consequence the Chinese could only use their bow guns. The size of the British ships made traditional boarding tactics useless, and the junks carried fewer and inferior weapons. In addition, the Chinese ships were poorly armoured; in several battles, British shells and rockets penetrated Chinese magazines and detonated gunpowder stores. Highly manoeuvrable steamships such as Nemesis could decimate small fleets of junks, as the junks had little chance of catching up to and engaging the faster British steamers. The only western-style warship in the Qing Navy, the converted East Indiaman Cambridge, was destroyed in the Battle of First Bar.

Apparently, the Chinese emperor was aware of this. In an 1842 edict he said:

... the invasion by the rebellious barbarians, they depended upon their strong ships and effective guns to commit outrageous acts on the seas and harm our people, largely because the native war junks are too small to match them. For this reason I, the emperor, repeatedly ordered our generals to resist on land and not to fight on seas ... When the enemy ships come, no resistance can be offered; when they go away no means of pursuit are available ... In my opinion what the rebellious barbarians rely upon is the fact that Chinese war junks are incapable of going out to sea to fight them.

The defensive nature of the conflict resulted in the Chinese relying heavily on an extensive network of fortifications. The Kangxi Emperor (1654–1722) began the construction of river defences to combat pirates, and encouraged the use of western style cannons. By the time of the First Opium War, multiple forts defended most major Chinese cities and waterways. Although the forts were well armed and strategically positioned, the Qing defeat exposed major flaws in their design. The cannons used in the Qing defensive fortifications were a collection of Chinese, Portuguese, Spanish, and British pieces. The domestically produced Chinese cannon were crafted using sub-par forging methods, limiting their effectiveness in combat and causing excessive gun barrel wear. The Chinese blend of gunpowder also contained more charcoal than the British mixture did; while this made it more stable and thus easier to store, it also limited its potential as a propellant, decreasing projectile range and accuracy. Overall, Chinese cannon technology was considered to be 200 years behind that of the British.

Chinese forts were unable to withstand attacks by European weaponry, as they were designed without angled glacis and many did not have protected magazines. The limited range of the Qing cannon allowed the British to bombard the Qing defences from a safe distance, then land soldiers to storm them with minimal risk. Many of the larger Chinese guns were built as fixed emplacements and were unable to be maneuvered to fire at British ships. The failure of the Qing fortifications coupled with the Chinese underestimation of the Royal Navy allowed the British to force their way up major rivers and impede Qing logistics. Most notably, the powerful series of forts at Humen were well positioned to stop an invader from proceeding upriver to Guangzhou, but it had not been considered that an enemy would attack and destroy the forts themselves, as the British did during the war.

At the start of the war the Qing army consisted of over 200,000 soldiers, with around 800,000 men being able to be called for war. These forces consisted of Manchu bannermen, the Green Standard Army, provincial militias, and imperial garrisons. The Qing armies were armed with matchlocks and shotguns, which had an effective range of 100 metres. Chinese historians Liu and Zhang note that the Chinese soldiers "were equipped with sixty or seventy percent traditional weapons, of which the most important were the long lance, the side sword, the bow and arrow, and the rattan shield, and only thirty or forty percent [of their armament consisted of] gunpowder weapons, of which the most important were the matchlock musket, the heavy musket, the cannon, the fire arrow, and the earthshaking bomb and such things." Chinese soldiers were also equipped with halberds, spears, swords, and crossbows. The Qing dynasty also employed large batteries of artillery in battle.

The tactics of the Qing remained consistent with what they had been in previous centuries. Soldiers with firearms would form ranks and fire volleys into the enemy while men armed with spears and pikes would drive the enemy off of the battlefield. Cavalry was used to break infantry formations and pursue routed enemies, while Qing artillery was used to scatter enemy formations and destroy fortifications. During the First Opium War, these tactics were unable to successfully deal with British firepower. Chinese melee formations were decimated by artillery, and Chinese soldiery armed with matchlocks could not effectively exchange fire with British ranks, who greatly outranged them. Most battles of the war were fought in cities or on cliffs and riverbanks, limiting the Qing usage of cavalry. Many Qing cannon were destroyed by British counter-battery fire, and British light infantry companies were consistently able to outflank and capture Chinese artillery batteries. A British officer said of the opposing Qing forces, "The Chinese are robust muscular fellows, and no cowards; the Tartars [i.e. Manchus] desperate; but neither are well commanded nor acquainted with European warfare. Having had, however, experience of three of them, I am inclined to suppose that a Tartar bullet is not a whit softer than a French one."

The strategy of the Qing dynasty during the war was to prevent the British from seizing Chinese territory. This defensive strategy was hampered by the Qing severely underestimating the capacity of the British military. Qing defences on the Pearl and Yangtze rivers were ineffective in stopping the British push inland, and superior naval artillery prevented the Chinese from retaking cities. The Qing imperial bureaucracy was unable to react quickly to the prodding British attacks, while officials and commanders often reported false, faulty, or incomplete information to their superiors. The Qing military system made it difficult to deploy troops to counter the mobile British forces. In addition, the ongoing conflict with Sikhs on the Qing border with India drew away some of the most experienced Qing units from the war with Britain.

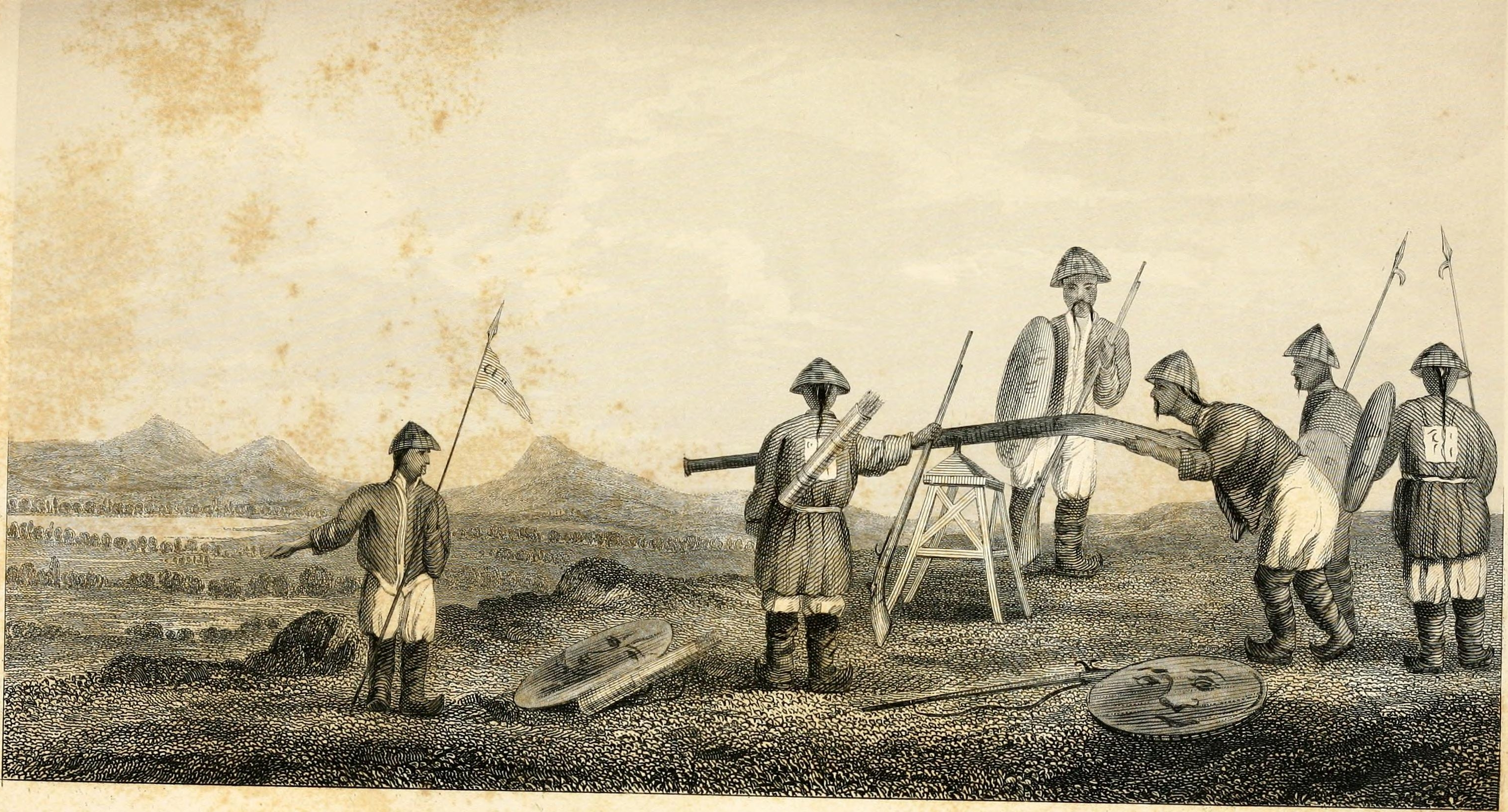
Chinese soldiers armed with a gingal during the First Opium War.

== Aftermath ==
The war ended in the signing of China's first unequal treaty, the Treaty of Nanking. In the supplementary Treaty of the Bogue, the Qing empire also recognised Britain as an equal to China and gave British subjects extraterritorial privileges in treaty ports. In 1844, the United States and France concluded similar treaties with China, the Treaty of Wanghia and Treaty of Whampoa, respectively.

In addition to opening China to European opium traders, the European trade in captive Chinese coolie labor boomed. Anglophone capitalists referred to this trade collectively as "poison and pigs."

China was required to permit foreign missionaries and the unequal treaties gave European powers jurisdiction over missions and some authority over Chinese Christians.

== Legacy ==
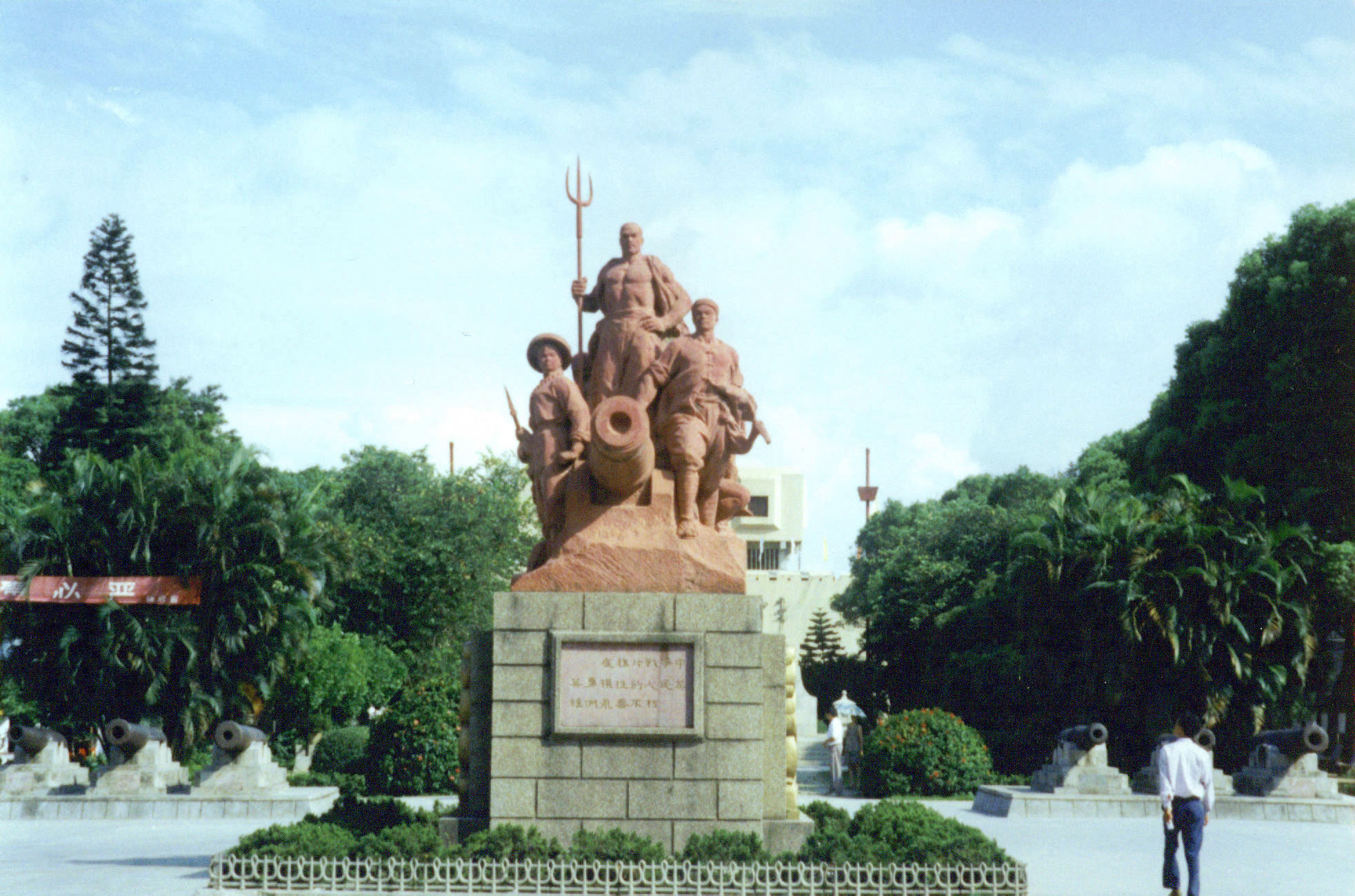
Entrance of the Opium War Museum in Humen Town, Guangdong

The cannons of Weiyuan Fort displayed in front of the Guangdong Museum of Revolutionary History

The opium trade faced intense disapproval from the British politician William Ewart Gladstone, who would later go on to serve as Britain's Prime Minister. Gladstone lambasted the First Opium War as "Palmerston's Opium War" and said in May 1840 that he felt "in dread of the judgments of God upon England for our national iniquity towards China". Gladstone made a famous speech in Parliament against the war, stating, "A war more unjust in its origin, a war more calculated to cover this country with disgrace, I do not know, and I have not read of." His hostility to opium stemmed from the effects opium brought upon his sister Helen. Due to the First Opium war brought on by Palmerston, there was initial reluctance to join the government of Peel on part of Gladstone before 1841.

The war marked the start of what 20th century Chinese nationalists called the "century of humiliation". The ease with which the British forces defeated the numerically superior Chinese armies damaged the dynasty's prestige. The Treaty of Nanking was a step to opening the lucrative Chinese market to global commerce and the opium trade. The interpretation of the war, which was long the standard in the People's Republic of China, was summarised in 1976: The Opium War, "in which the Chinese people fought against British aggression, marked the beginning of modern Chinese history and the start of the Chinese people's bourgeois-democratic revolution against imperialism and feudalism."

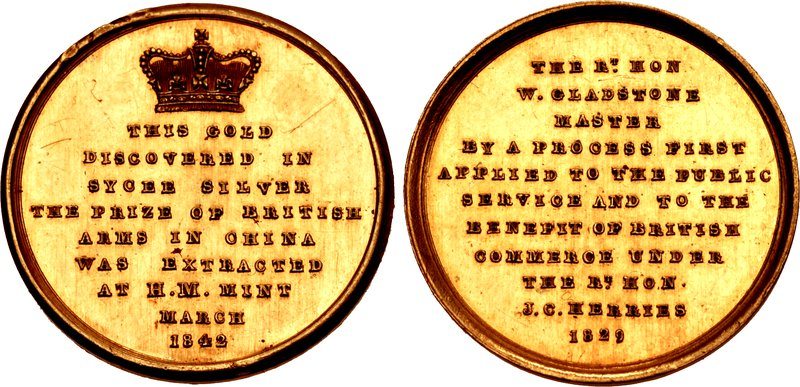
British gold medal, dually dated 1829 and March 1842, London mint. Extracted out of the Chinese silver indemnity payments of the Treaty of Nanking

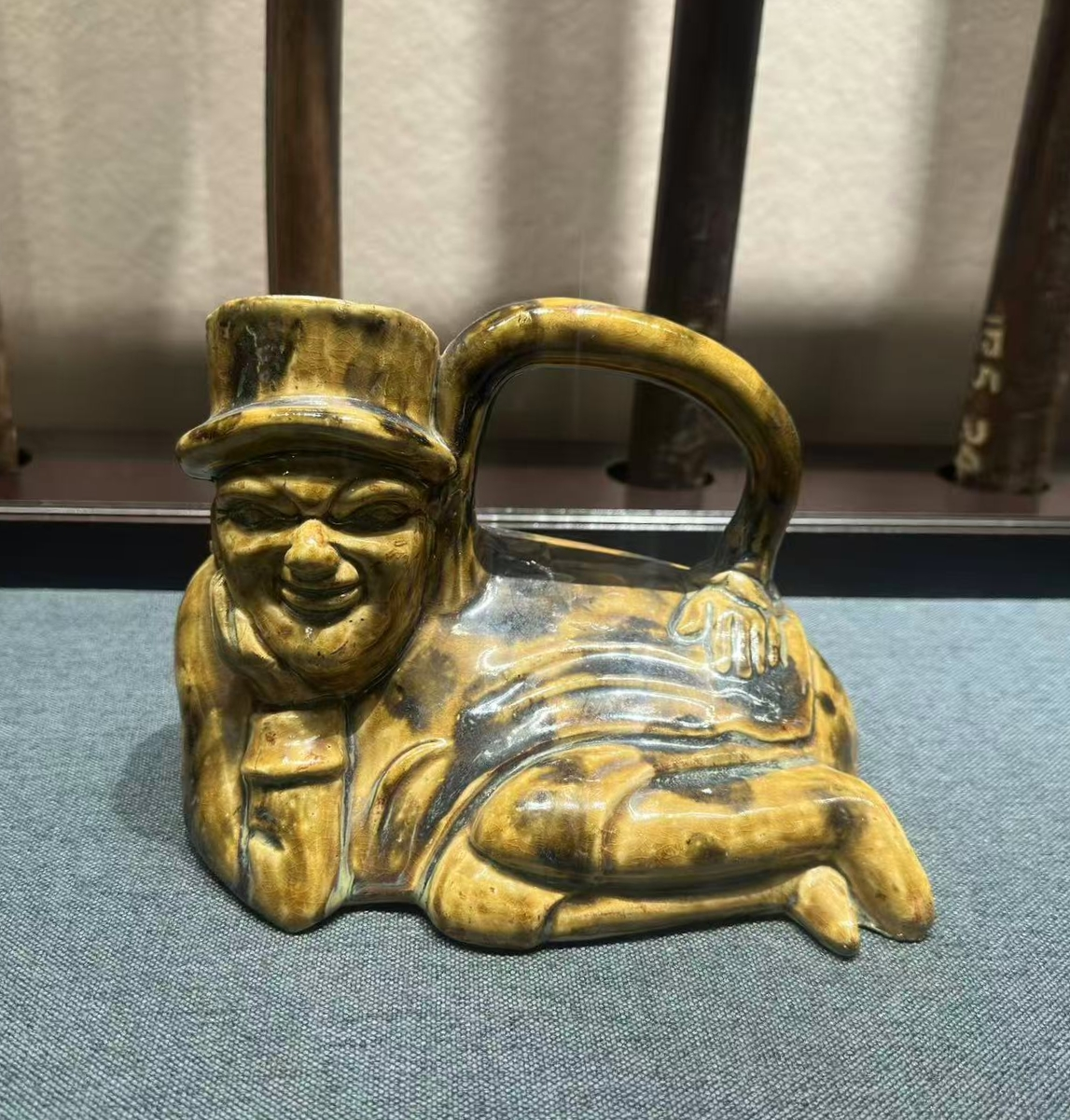
A ceramic chamber pot the shape of a British man, made by local Guangzhou craftsmen in the aftermath of the First Opium War

The Treaty of Nanking, the Supplementary Treaty of the Bogue, and two French and American agreements were all "unequal treaties" signed between 1842 and 1844. The terms of these treaties undermined China's traditional mechanisms of foreign relations and methods of controlled trade. Five ports were opened for trade, gunboats, and foreign residence: Guangzhou, Xiamen, Fuzhou, Ningbo, and Shanghai. Hong Kong was seized by the British to become a free and open port. Tariffs were abolished thus preventing the Chinese from raising future duties to protect domestic industries and extraterritorial practices exempted Westerners from Chinese law. This made them subject to their own civil and criminal laws of their home country. Most importantly, the opium problem was never addressed and after the treaty was signed opium addiction doubled. China was forced to pay 21 million silver taels as an indemnity, which was used to pay compensation for the traders' opium destroyed by Commissioner Lin. A couple of years after the treaties were signed internal rebellion began to threaten foreign trade. Due to the Qing government's inability to control collection of taxes on imported goods, the British government convinced the Manchu court to allow Westerners to partake in government official affairs. By the 1850s the Chinese Maritime Customs Service, one of the most important bureaucracies in the Manchu Government, was partially staffed and managed by Western Foreigners. In 1858, opium was legalised, and would remain a problem.

Commissioner Lin, often referred to as "Lin the Clear Sky" for his moral probity, was made a scapegoat. He was blamed for ultimately failing to stem the tide of opium imports and usage as well as for provoking an unwinnable war through his rigidity and lack of understanding of the changing world. Nevertheless, as the Chinese nation formed in the 20th century, Lin became viewed as a hero, and has been immortalised at various locations around China.

The First Opium War both reflected and contributed to a further weakening of the Chinese state's power and legitimacy. Anti-Qing sentiment grew in the form of rebellions, such as the Taiping Rebellion, a war lasting from 1850 to 1864 in which at least 20 million Chinese died. The decline of the Qing dynasty was beginning to be felt by much of the Chinese population.

=== Revisionist views ===
The impact of the opium habit on the Chinese people, and the manner in which the British imposed their power to guarantee the profitable trade, have been staples of Chinese historiography ever since. The British historian Jasper Ridley concluded:

Conflict between China and Britain was inevitable. On the one side was a corrupt, decadent and caste-ridden despotism, with no desire or ability to wage war, which relied on custom much more than force for the enforcement of extreme privilege and discrimination, and which was blinded by a deep-rooted superiority complex into believing that they could assert their supremacy over Europeans without possessing military power. On the other side was the most economically advanced nation in the world, a nation of pushing, bustling traders, of self-help, free trade, and the pugnacious qualities of John Bull.

However, Ridley adds, opposition in Britain was intense:

An entirely opposite British viewpoint was promoted by humanitarians and reformers such as the Chartists and religious nonconformists led by a young Gladstone. They argued that Palmerston (the foreign secretary) was only interested in the huge profits it would bring Britain, and was totally oblivious to the horrible moral evils of opium which the Chinese government was valiantly trying to stamp out.

The American historian John K. Fairbank wrote:

In demanding diplomatic equality and commercial opportunity, Britain represented all the Western states, which would sooner or later have demanded the same things if Britain had not. It was an accident of history that the dynamic British commercial interests in the China trade was centered not only on tea but also on opium. If the main Chinese demand had continued to be for Indian raw cotton, or at any rate if there had been no market for opium in late-Ch'ing China, as there had been none earlier, then there would have been no "opium war". Yet probably some kind of Sino-foreign war would have come, given the irresistible vigor of Western expansion and immovable inertia of Chinese institutions.

Some historians claim that Lord Palmerston, the British Foreign Secretary, initiated the Opium War to maintain the principle of free trade. Professor Glenn Melancon, for example, argues that the issue in going to war was not opium but Britain's need to uphold its reputation, its honour and its commitment to global free trade. China was pressing Britain just when the British faced serious pressures in the Near East, on the Indian frontier and in Latin America. In the end, says Melancon, the government's need to maintain its honour in Britain and prestige abroad forced the decision to go to war. Former American president John Quincy Adams commented that opium was "a mere incident to the dispute ... the cause of the war is the kowtow—the arrogant and insupportable pretensions of China that she will hold commercial intercourse with the rest of mankind not upon terms of equal reciprocity, but upon the insulting and degrading forms of the relations between lord and vassal."

Ray Huang, in China: A Macro History, provides a broader context for understanding the Opium War. He argues that the causes of the conflict cannot be solely reduced to economic factors or immediate diplomatic tensions. Huang emphasizes the deep structural issues within the Qing dynasty, including economic strain, bureaucratic inefficiencies, and social unrest. These issues weakened the Qing state's ability to respond effectively to both internal and external pressures. The mounting frustrations of Chinese officials and the social dislocations they faced played a significant role in pushing the government towards harsher policies against the opium trade.

The Australian historian Harry G. Gelber argues that opium played a role similar to the tea dumped into the harbour in the Boston Tea Party of 1773 leading to the American Revolutionary War. Gelber argues instead:

The British went to war because of Chinese military threats to defenceless British civilians, including women and children; because China refused to negotiate on terms of diplomatic equality and because China refused to open more ports than Guangzhou to trade, not just with Britain but with everybody. The belief about British "guilt" came later, as part of China's long catalogue of alleged Western "exploitation and aggression".

The Qing government hampered foreign trade and through the Canton System concentrated trade in Guangzhou. That being said, the policy of concentrating trade to a single port was also used in Western countries such as Spain and Portugal. Western merchants could also trade freely and legally with Chinese merchants in Xiamen and Macao or when the trade was conducted through ports outside China such as Manila and Batavia. Furthermore, Macao was restricted to Portuguese traders, and Xiamen the Spanish, who rarely made use of this privilege.

Segments of the public in Britain and American had earlier condemned the British government for supporting the opium trade. Opium was the most profitable single commodity trade of the 19th century. As Timothy Brook and Bob Wakabayashi write of opium, "The British Empire could not survive were it deprived of its most important source of capital, the substance that could turn any other commodity into silver." Opium was the most common and the most profitable trade good and comprised 33–54% of all goods shipped from Bengal to the East between 1815 and 1818. Carl Trocki described "the British Empire east of Suez as of 1800 as essentially a drug cartel." James Bradley states that "between 1814 and 1850, the opium trade sucked out 11 percent of China's money supply".

Although shipping was regulated, the Qianlong emperor's administration was diligent in accommodating the requisites of Western merchants. It hired a growing body of Western assistants for the Customs Office to help manage its fellow countrymen. The order to stay in Macao during the winter was lifted; tax was exempted on food, drink, and basic supplies for Western merchants; and protections were granted to Westerners and their property. Qing laws prevented Chinese from pursuing foreigners through the courts. The prohibition mainly dated from the Qianlong Emperor's strong conviction that mistreatment of foreigners had been a major cause of the overthrow of several earlier dynasties.

During the Macartney Embassy, both sides dismissed the gifts given to each other due to underestimating their importance. Instances of British sailors killing Chinese sailors during the late 18th and early 19th centuries, accidentally or otherwise, led to an increasing breakdown in Anglo-Chinese relations. In 1816, the Jiaqing Emperor dismissed a British embassy for its refusal to kowtow, but he sent them an apologetic letter with gifts, which was later found unread in the archives of the Foreign Office in London. Britain's brief occupation of Portuguese Macau during the French Revolutionary and Napoleonic Wars and attacks on American merchantmen in Canton during the War of 1812 along with its support for Nepal during the Sino-Nepalese War and later hostility as part of the Anglo-Nepalese War led the Chinese government to become highly suspicious of British intentions. In 1834, when British naval vessels intruded into Chinese waters again, the Daoguang Emperor commented: "How laughable and deplorable is it that we cannot even repel two barbarian ships. Our military had decayed so much. No wonder the barbarians are looking down on us."

=== Question of inevitability ===
Historians have often pondered whether the war could have been avoided. One factor was that China rejected diplomatic relations with the British or anyone else, as seen in the rejection of the Macartney mission in 1793. As a result, diplomatic mechanisms for negotiation and resolution were missing. Michael Greenberg locates the inevitable cause in the momentum for more and more overseas trade in Britain's expanding modern economy. On the other hand, the economic forces inside Britain that were war hawks, Radicals in Parliament and northern merchants and manufacturers, were a political minority and needed allies, especially Palmerston, before they could get their war. In Parliament, the Melbourne government faced a host of complex international threats including the Chartist riots at home, bothersome budget deficits, unrest in Ireland, rebellions in Canada and Jamaica, war in Afghanistan, and French threats to British business interests in Mexico and Argentina. The opposition demanded more aggressive answers, and it was Foreign Minister Palmerston who set up an easy war to solve the political crisis. It was not economics, opium sales or expanding trade that caused the British to go to war, Melancon argues, but it was more a matter of upholding aristocratic standards of national honour sullied by Chinese insults.

One historiographical problem is that the emphasis on the British causal factors tends to ignore the Chinese. The Manchu rulers were focused on internal unrest by Chinese elements and paid little attention to the minor issues happening in Guangzhou. The historian James Polachek argues the reasons for trying to suppress the opium trade had to do with internal factionalism led by a purification-oriented group of literary scholars who paid no attention to the risk of international intervention by much more powerful military forces. Therefore, it was not a matter of inevitable conflict between contrasting worldviews. Lin and the Daoguang Emperor, comments Spence, "seemed to have believed that the citizens of Guangzhou and the foreign traders there had simple, childlike natures that would respond to firm guidance and statements of moral principles set out in simple, clear terms." Neither considered the possibility that the British government would be committed to protecting the smugglers. Polachek argues, based on records of court debate, that growing court awareness that opium addiction in the Guangdong military garrisons, caused by widespread collusion between British smugglers, Chinese smugglers and Chinese officials, had completely impaired their military effectiveness. That left the entire southern flank of the Qing exposed to military threats and was more important in generating opposition to the drug trade than economic reasons. Polachek shows that Lin Zexu and the hardliners (mistakenly) believed that by arresting drug abusers, confiscating the opium supplies and promising to allow the British to continue trading in other goods, they could persuade the British to give up the drug trade without a war.

== See also ==
- Illustrated Treatise on the Maritime Kingdoms
- The Opium War (film)

=== Individuals ===
- William Jardine (merchant)
- William Napier, 9th Lord Napier
- David Sassoon
