= Humphrey Fleming Senhouse =

British Royal Navy officer

Captain Sir Humphrey Fleming Senhouse KCH CB
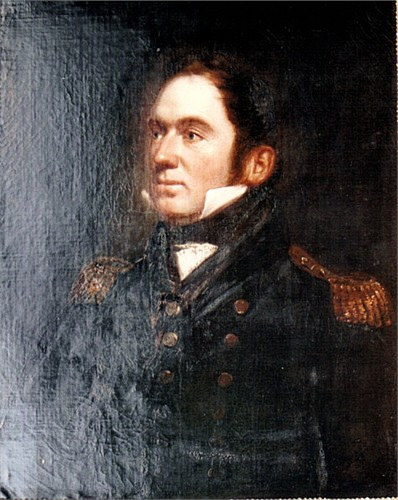
- Born: 29 June 1781; Barbados
- Died: 13 June 1841 (aged 59); Hong Kong
- Burial place: Old Protestant Cemetery, Macao
- Military career
- Allegiance: United Kingdom
- Branch: Royal Navy
- Service years: 1797–1841
- Rank: Captain
- Wars: Napoleonic Wars; War of 1812; First Anglo-Chinese War
- Awards: KCH (1832); Kt (1834); CB (1841)

Captain Sir Humphrey Fleming Senhouse (Note: Sometimes written as Humphrey Le Fleming Senhouse.) KCH CB (29 June 1781 – 13 June 1841) was a distinguished British Royal Navy officer. He served in the Napoleonic Wars, in the War of 1812, and in the First Anglo-Chinese War.

He was the senior Royal Navy officer of the British fleet in China from 31 March 1841 until his death on board his flagship, HMS Blenheim, in Hong Kong from fever during the capture of Canton.

== Early life ==
Senhouse was born on 29 June 1781 in Barbados, where he was baptised on 23 August 1781 in the Parish of Saint Philip. He was the third son of William Senhouse (1741–1800) by the same's wife Elizabeth Ward Wood. William was a lieutenant in the Royal Navy, and Surveyor-General of Barbados and of the British Leeward Islands. Elizabeth was the daughter of Samson Wood, the speaker of the Barbados Assembly. Senhouse's grandfather, who was also named Humphrey Senhouse, of Netherhall, Cumberland, married Mary, who was the daughter of Sir George Fleming, 2nd Baronet, Bishop of Carlisle.

Senhouse joined the Royal Navy in January 1797 on HMS Prince of Wales, which was the flagship of Rear-Admiral Henry Harvey in the West Indies Station. Senhouse in November 1797 moved to the brig Requin, in which he arrived in England for the first time in 1799. Senhouse from March 1800 to April 1802 served in HMS Fisgard under Captains Thomas Byam Martin and Michael Seymour.

== Mediterranean and North America ==
On 7 April 1802, Senhouse passed the examination for promotion to lieutenant, and was attached to HMS Galgo two days later. In May 1803, he was appointed to HMS Conqueror with Captain Thomas Louis. With Israel Pellew, who relieved Louis in April 1804, Senhouse served in the Mediterranean, West Indies, and in the Battle of Trafalgar, until January 1806. He again went to the West Indies on board HMS Elephant, and was put on board the flagship of HMS Northumberland under Sir Alexander Cochrane. In September 1806, he was appointed to command HMS Express on the Spanish Main and Leeward Islands until March 1808, when he joined HMS Belleisle as a flag-lieutenant to Cochrane, who sent him home with despatches in July 1808 in HMS Subtle.

On 26 January 1809, Senhouse rejoined Cochrane, now in command of HMS Neptune. After assisting in the debarkation of troops in the invasion of Martinique, he was promoted on 7 March to HMS Wolverine, which he commanded in the West Indies until the following December. There, he also commanded HMS Ringdove and HMS Superieure. He was promoted to commander on 2 June. From 1810 to 1812, Senhouse commanded HMS Recruit at Gibraltar, Newfoundland, and the Halifax Station. He then commanded the 18-gun sloop HMS Martin from 1812 to 1814 in the Halifax Station.

In the War of 1812 against the United States, he defended the Martin, aground in Delaware Bay, against a flotilla of eight gunboats and two blockships on 29 July 1813. He made prize of the 6-gun privateer Snap Dragon containing 80 men, assisted in the capture of Moose Island, and was sent home with despatches by Cochrane, announcing the success of the expedition in Castine, Maine. He was promoted to post-captain on 12 October 1814, and from April to September 1815, commanded HMS Superb on the coast of France as flag-captain to Sir Henry Hotham. From 25 February 1831 to 1834, he served in HMS St Vincent, most of the time as flag-captain to Vice-Admiral Hotham, commander-in-chief of the Mediterranean Station. King William IV told Hotham at Windsor:

Sir Henry, you are most fortunate in having one of the cleverest fellows of the navy for your Captain. [...] Yes, I am sure I need not tell you so; he must be not only a clever man, but most zealous in his profession; few like him would have employed the leisure the peace has given him in gaining the information he has; there was not a question I asked him that he could not give me a ready and satisfactory reply. [...] You are lucky in having him.

In July 1831, British warships in the Mediterranean observed smoke from the emergence of a volcanic island between Pantelleria and Malta. After being detached in the cutter Hind to ascertain the smoke's position, Senhouse landed on the volcanic island on 3 August, where he planted the Union Jack and named it Graham Island. He was nominated a Knight Commander of the Hanoverian Guelphic Order on 13 April 1832, and made a Knight Bachelor on 5 June 1834.

Moody was a friend of the fellow freemason and Royal Engineer Colonel Thomas Moody ADC Kt., whom he consulted during 1838 for important engineering projects: including the Caledonian Railway, and the West Cumberland Railway, and the Furness Railway, and the embankments at Morecambe Bay and Duddon Sands.

== China ==
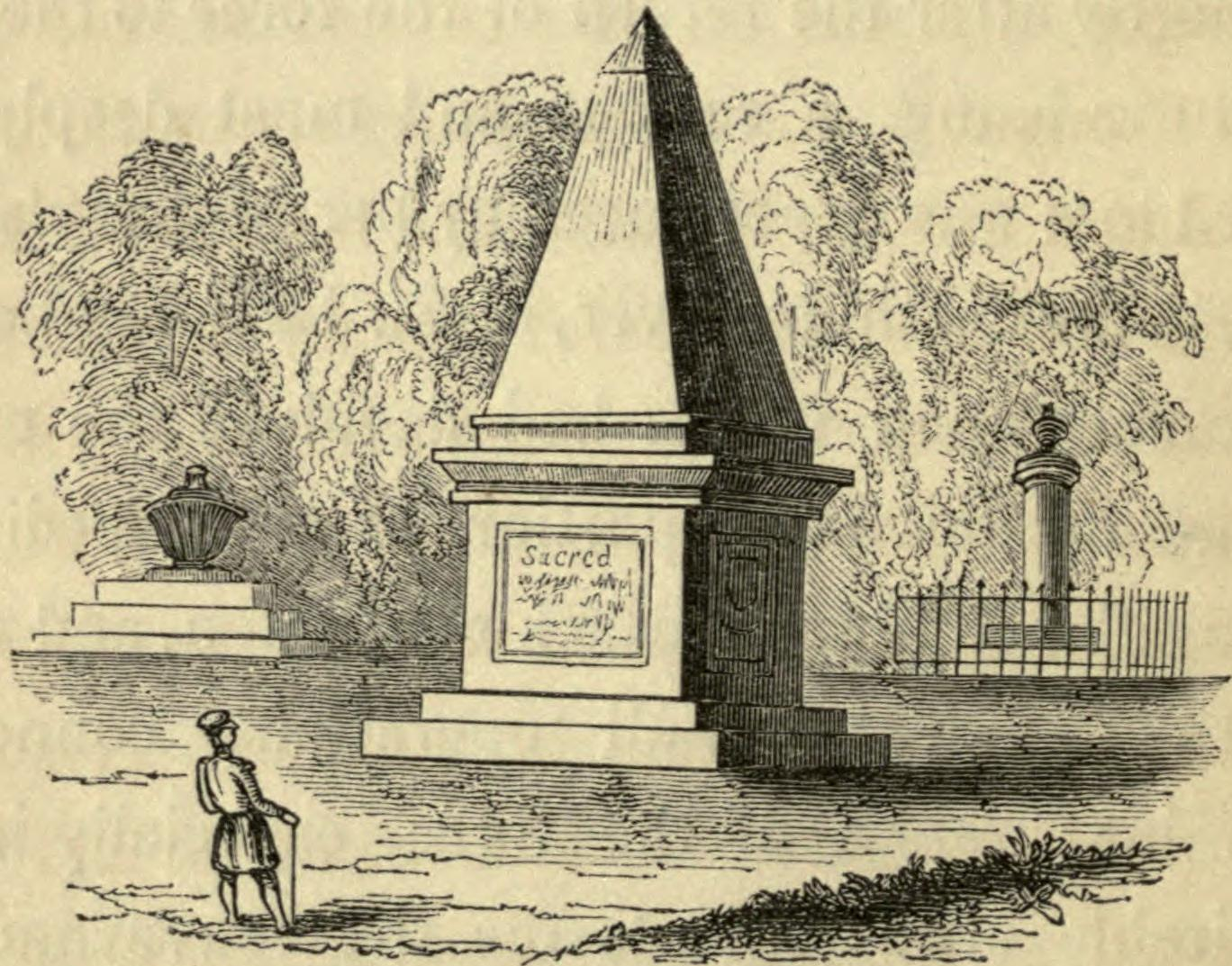
Tomb of Senhouse in Macao (published 1844)

On 9 April 1839, Senhouse commissioned HMS Blenheim. He was sent from England to fill the office of second-in-command of British naval forces in China, where he served in the First Anglo-Chinese War. Commodore Gordon Bremer, commander-in-chief of British forces, entrusted the attack on Anunghoy Island to Senhouse in the capture of the Bogue forts on 26 February 1841. After the Blenheim fired broadsides from starboard at the island's fort, Senhouse landed with about 300 marines and seamen to clear the few remaining defenders. On 31 March, Bremer sailed to Calcutta in the steamer Queen to confer with Lord Auckland about the state of affairs and request reinforcements, leaving Senhouse in command of the naval forces.

On 13 June 1841, Senhouse died on board the Blenheim in Hong Kong from fever contracted during the operations in Canton in May 1841. As the next senior naval officer, Captain Thomas Herbert took over command of the ship and fleet. Duncan MacPherson of the Madras Army wrote, "On the morning of the 13th of June, when it was announced to him [Senhouse] that all hopes of saving his life was at an end, he immediately directed that the signal be made for all captains of H. M.'s ships to repair on board; but ere the first had arrived, our gallant commodore was a corpse."

Before he died, he wished to be interred in Macao because of uncertainty about Hong Kong's future as a British settlement. The steamship Nemesis arrived with his body in Macao on 16 June. The next morning, a funeral procession began from Captain Charles Elliot's house. Major-General Hugh Gough, Captain Herbert, Deputy Superintendent of Trade Alexander Johnston, at least 70 military officers, and nearly all the British and foreign residents were in attendance. Also present was the Portuguese governor of Macau, his band who played the funeral march, and a contingent of Portuguese troops who fired three volleys over his grave at the Old Protestant Cemetery.

On 29 June, Senhouse was nominated a Companion of the Most Honourable Military Order of the Bath. A bell that he captured in the Bogue forts was sent to England by Captain John Charles Pitman in HMS Druid. It was donated to St Mary's Church in Gosforth by Senhouse's widow in 1844. Mount Stenhouse on Lamma Island is almost certainly named for him, but has acquired a misspelling over time.

== Family ==
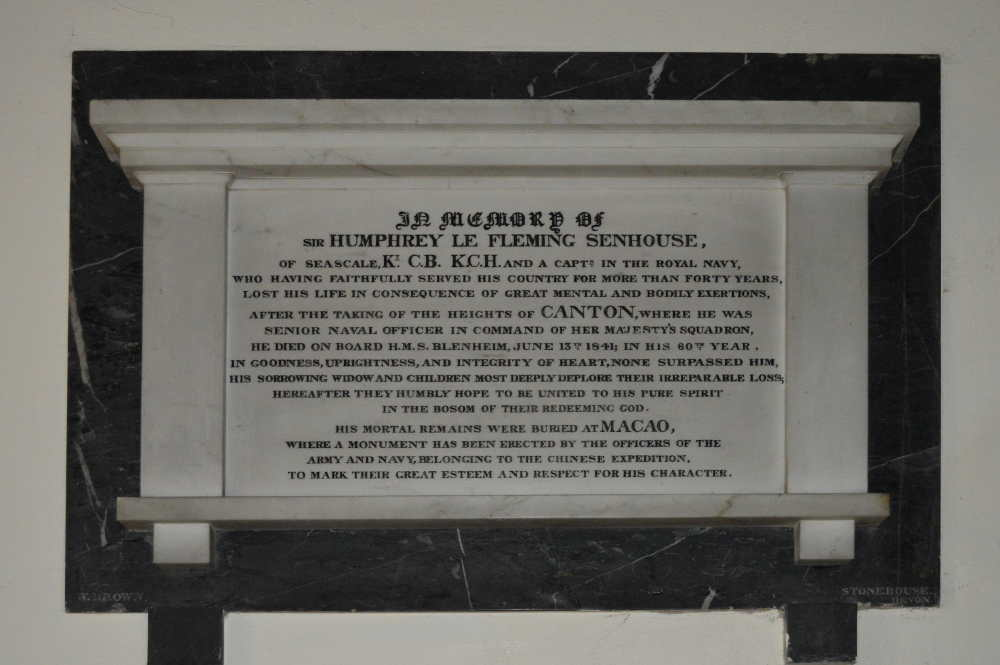
Memorial in Gosforth church

In 1810, Senhouse married Elizabeth, daughter of Vice-Admiral John Manley. She died on 1 March 1865, aged 81. They had two daughters:

- Elizabeth Manley Fleming Senhouse, who at Gosforth on 5 October 1843 married Captain Pitman, who had served as Senhouse's aide-de-camp in China.
- Rose Mary Fleming Senhouse (d. at Gosforth 11 January 1903, aged 74)

Senhouse purchased the manor of Seascale in 1834. He built the mansion Seascale (later named Steelfield) in Gosforth.
