= HMS Ballahoo =

Schooner in the British Royal Navy

History

United Kingdom
- Name: HMS Ballahoo
- Ordered: 23 June 1803
- Builder: Goodrich & Co. (prime contractor), Bermuda
- Laid down: 1803
- Launched: 1804
- Honours and awards: Naval General Service Medal with clasp "Guadaloupe"
- Captured: 29 April 1814 by American privateer
- Fate: Wrecked immediately thereafter

General characteristics
- Type: Ballahoo-class schooner
- Tons burthen: 7041/94 (bm)
- Length: 55 ft 2 in (16.81 m) (overall); 40 ft 10 1/2 in (12.5 m) (keel)
- Beam: 18 ft 0 in (5.49 m)
- Depth of hold: 9 ft 0 in (2.74 m)
- Sail plan: Schooner
- Complement: 20
- Armament: 4 × 12-pounder carronades

HMS Ballahoo (also Balahou, Ballahou or Ballahon) was the first of the Royal Navy's Ballahoo-class schooners, vessels of four 12-pounder carronades and a crew of 20. The prime contractor for the vessel was Goodrich & Co., in Bermuda, and she was launched in 1804. She patrolled primarily in the Leeward Islands, taking several small prizes, before an American privateer captured her in 1814 during the War of 1812.

== Service ==
She was commissioned in January 1804 under Lieutenant William Shephard. In September Lieutenant Eaton Stannard Travers took over. He was appointed to Ballahoo immediately after receiving his commission on 23 September 1804. When she was ordered to Halifax in February 1805 Admiral Sir John T. Duckworth transferred him to the frigate Surveillante. (Note: For more on Eaton Stannard Travers see: O'Byrne, William R. (1849). "Travers, Eaton Stannard" . A Naval Biographical Dictionary. London: John Murray.)

Command then transferred to Lieutenant H.N. Bowen, who was killed in 1806. (Note: A press report stated that Lieutenant Rowe [sic] had been attempting to impress some sailors from a Guineaman (slave ship) at Dominica when a shot from the Guineaman killed him. The coroner's jury found a charge of willful murder against the captain of the Guineaman.) Lieutenant James Murray replaced Bowen.

On 27 February 1807 the sloop Port d'Espagne and the schooner Express captured the brig Altrevido, Nichola Valpardo, master. Ballahoo shared by agreement in the prize money due Express.

On 4 August 1807, Ballahoo was in company with the schooner Laura, of 10 guns, when they encountered the French letter of marque Rhone some five or six leagues N by E of Tobago. After a running fight of several hours, they captured her. In the fight Rhone suffered two dead and five wounded out of her crew of 26; the British had no casualties. Rhone, under the command of Francis Goureu, was of 90 tons (bm), mounted six long 6-pounder guns, and was 10 days out from Martinique, having captured nothing.

On 20 August Ballahoo's boats, with the assistance of the 1-gun privateer Maria that Port d'Espagne had taken, destroyed a small privateer in the Bay of San Juan. Head money was paid some 21 years later. (Note: A first-class share was worth £36 0s 9¼d; a fifth-class share, that of a seaman, was worth 4s 11¼d.)

On 12 September Ballahoo assisted Port d'Espagne in capturing another small privateer, Rosario, in the same bay. Rosario also was armed with one gun, and had a crew of 34, all of whom escaped on shore. In October Ballahou was in North American waters and in the Leeward Islands.

In 1808 her commander was Lieutenant George Mills. On 3 July, whilst Ballahoo was cruising with the ship-sloop Wanderer, under Commander Edward Crofton, and the schooner Subtle, Lieutenant George A. Spearing, between the islands of Anguilla and Saint Martin, the small squadron attempted an attack on St. Martin with a view to reducing the number of havens available to French privateers, but unfortunately the opposition proved stronger than intelligence had suggested.

A landing party of 38 seamen and marines from all three vessels, under Lieutenant Spearing, succeeded in capturing a lower battery with few losses and spiking six guns. The attack turned into a disaster. An attack on the upper fort failed, with Spearing being killed a few feet from the French ramparts. When the British tried to withdraw to their boats the French captured them. In all, the British lost seven killed and 30 wounded, all the dead and most of the wounded being from Subtle. The French lost one man wounded.

Not surprisingly, French and British accounts differ substantially in several places. Crofton's account reports that the British landing party consisted of 153 men, and a French account talks of 200 men, all of whom were killed or captured, including Mills of Ballahoo. (The total establishment of the three British vessels amounted to about 190 men.) Crofton negotiated a truce under which he was able to reclaim all the prisoners who could be moved. Crofton claimed that the French had been forewarned and had 900 men in the fort. The French claimed the fort had a garrison of 28 regulars and 15 militia men. That the French permitted their British prisoners to leave is more consistent with the French figures on their numbers than the British. Crofton reported that the French buried the English dead with full military honors with both the fort and the British firing salutes.

In January and February 1810 Ballahoo, under Mills, participated in the capture of Guadeloupe. (Note: A first-class share of the prize money for Guadaloupe was worth £113 3s 1¼d; a sixth-class share, that of an ordinary seaman, was worth £1 9s 1¼d.) In 1847 the Admiralty authorized the issuance of the Naval General Service Medal with clasp "Guadaloupe" to all still surviving participants of that campaign. At some point Express and Ballahoo captured the sloop Endeavour.

== Capture ==
In 1810 Lieutenant Norfolk King took command. (Note: Norfolk King was the "natural" son of Philip Gidley King, and the first child born on Norfolk Island. He was apparently also the Royal Navy's first Australian-born officer.) On 29 April 1814, the American 5-gun privateer Perry captured Ballahoo off South Carolina. Apparently the chase took about an hour, including a fight of about 10 minutes. There was no report of casualties on either side. The Americans took her into the port of Wilmington, North Carolina. At the time of the capture, Ballahoo had two of her cannon stored below deck to lower her center of gravity in bad weather, and a crew of thirteen men. Perry's five guns included one long 18 or 24-pounder on a pivot, and she had a crew of 80.

== Fate ==
Apparently, as Ballahoo entered the port of Wilmington, a British brig chased her ashore, where she was destroyed.
