= HMS Subtle (1807) =

History

United Kingdom
- Name: HMS Subtle
- Acquired: 1807 by capture; purchased and registered 1808
- Honours and awards: Naval General Service Medal with clasps: "Martinique"; "Guadaloupe"
- Fate: Foundered 30 November 1812

General characteristics
- Tons burthen: 139 (bm)
- Length: Overall: 76 ft (23.2 m); Keel: 58 ft 9 in (17.9 m)
- Beam: 21 ft 1 in (6.4 m)
- Depth of hold: 9 ft 6 in (2.9 m)
- Propulsion: Sails
- Sail plan: Schooner
- Armament: 10 guns

HMS Subtle was a schooner that the Royal Navy reportedly captured in 1807, and purchased and registered in 1808. She served in the Caribbean, taking part in several actions, including a small debacle in 1808, and the capture of Martinique and Guadeloupe in 1809. She foundered in November 1812 with the loss of her entire crew.

== Origins ==
Based on Admiralty records, Winfield reports that she was possibly a privateer, possibly under the Danish flag, and sailing as Subtle. Unfortunately, there are no readily available online records that indicate the capture of any Danish (or Dutch – some reports state Subtle was Dutch), vessel named Subtle. It is possible that she had another name that the Royal Navy changed. For instance, the Royal Navy captured 12 Danish schooners at Christianstadt in the Danish West Indies on 25 December 1807, some of which had names that matched those of serving Navy vessels. It would have been standard Royal Navy practice to rename a capture to avoid duplicating names, reusing the names of recently lost or sold naval vessels. The Royal Navy schooner Subtle had just been wrecked at Bermuda on 20 October 1807, making her name available.

== Royal Navy career ==
Lieutenant Charles Nicholson commissioned Subtle at Antigua in 1807. In 1808 Lieutenant George A. Spearing replaced Nicholson.

On 3 July, Subtle was cruising with the ship-sloop Wanderer and the schooner Ballahoo between the islands of Anguilla and Saint Martin, the small squadron attempted an attack on St. Martin with a view to reducing the number of havens available to French privateers, but the opposition proved stronger than intelligence had led the British to expect.

The attack turned into a disaster. A landing party of 38 seamen and marines from all three vessels, under Lieutenant Spearing of Subtle, succeeded in capturing a lower battery with few losses and spiking six guns. An attack on the upper fort failed, with Spearing being killed a few feet from the French ramparts. When the British withdrew to their boats the French captured them. In all, the British lost seven killed and 30 wounded, all the dead and 17 of the wounded being from Subtle, which had contributed 43 men to the landing. The French lost one man wounded.

Not surprisingly, French and British accounts differ substantially in several places. Crofton reported that the British landing party consisted of 135 men, whereas a French account talks of 200 men, all of whom were killed or captured. (The total establishment of the three British vessels amounted to about 190 men.) Crofton negotiated a truce under which he was able to reclaim all the prisoners who could be moved. Crofton claimed that the French had been forewarned and had 900 men in the fort. The French claimed the fort had a garrison of 28 regulars and 15 militiamen. That the French permitted their British prisoners to leave is more consistent with the French figures on their numbers than the British. Crofton reported that the French buried the English dead with full military honors with both the fort and the British firing salutes.

Admiral Lord Collingwood received intelligence that the French corvette Rapide was on her way from Bayonne with dispatches and he asked Admiral Lord Alexander Cochrane to attempt to intercept her. On 8 August 1808 Belette captured Rapide and took her into Barbados, but Rapide's captain had managed to throw the dispatches overboard before Belette captured her. However, even earlier duplicates of the dispatches and much besides were found concealed aboard the cartel Phoenix, which had sailed from Cayenne and had stopped in Barbados. She had aroused suspicion, leading Cochrane to having her searched. Because carrying these documents was a violation of the cartel (truce) flag, the British seized Phoenix and the documents.

Cochrane put the dispatches aboard Subtle, and then appointed his flag-lieutenant from HMS Belleisle, Lieutenant Humphrey Fleming Senhouse, to sail Subtle back to Britain. The captain of Phoenix, Mr. Boarea, traveled on Subtle as a prisoner of war. Flemming left Carlisle Bay, Barbados on 19 July and arrived at Plymouth on 18 August.

Subtle underwent repairs at Plymouth between 19 August and 10 November. Lieutenant Charles Browne (or Brown), replaced Senhouse. She then sailed for the Leeward Islands on 15 December 1808.

In February 1809, Subtle participated in the combined naval and military assault and capture of the French-held island of Martinique. This qualified those of her crew still alive in 1847 for the Naval General Service Medal (NGSM) with clasp "Martinique". Subtle was among the 42 warships that shared in the proceeds for the capture of Martinique. She then participated in the capture of Guadeloupe (January – February 1810), which earned for her crew the clasp "Guadaloupe" to the NGSM, as well as further prize money, which she shared with 49 other vessels. (Note: A first-class share of the prize money was worth £113 9s 1¾d; a sixth-class share, was worth £1 9s 5½d.)

== Loss ==
On 1 December 1812, Captain Miller of the American privateer schooner Jack's Favorite, was re-provisioning at Saint Barts when Subtle arrived. Browne threatened to take the privateer, but in good time. Jack's Favorite sailed away, with Subtle in pursuit. During the chase a squall came up. After it had passed, Miller searched for Subtle but could find only floating debris.

British records give the date of loss as 30 November. The belief was that Subtle had capsized when she failed to shorten sail in time.
