= HMS Blenheim (1813) =

Vengeur-class ship of the line

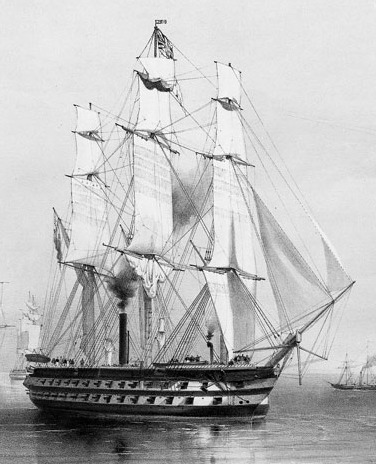
- Blenheim, c. 1855

History

United Kingdom
- Name: Blenheim
- Ordered: 4 January 1808
- Builder: Deptford Dockyard
- Laid down: August 1808
- Launched: 31 May 1813
- Commissioned: June 1813
- Fate: Broken up, 1865

General characteristics (as built)
- Class & type: Vengeur-class ship of the line
- Tons burthen: 1,757 71/94 (bm)
- Length: 176 ft 2 in (53.7 m) (gundeck)
- Beam: 47 ft 8 in (14.5 m)
- Draught: 17 ft 8 in (5.4 m) (light)
- Depth of hold: 21 ft (6.4 m)
- Sail plan: Full-rigged ship
- Complement: 590
- Armament: 74 muzzle-loading, smoothbore guns; Gundeck: 28 × 32 pdr guns; Upper deck: 28 × 18 pdr guns; Quarterdeck: 4 × 12 pdr guns + 10 × 32 pdr carronades; Forecastle: 2 × 12 pdr guns + 2 × 32 pdr carronades

HMS Blenheim was a 74-gun third rate Vengeur-class ship of the line built for the Royal Navy in the first decade of the 19th century. Completed in 1813, she played a minor role in the Napoleonic Wars.

Blenheim was placed on harbour service in 1831. Her captain, Humphrey Fleming Senhouse, died on board Blenheim in the morning of 13 June 1841, from fever contracted during operations in Canton, China, in May 1841.

On 20 March 1847, Blenheim was in collision with the British brig Cactus in the River Thames and was driven ashore on the Essex bank. The tug HMS Monkey attempted to refloat Blenheim, but Blenheim and Monkey collided and Blenheim was driven into the brig Agility, which was severely damaged. Monkey assisted in beaching Agility on the Essex bank to prevent her from sinking. Blenheim subsequently was refloated and taken in to Woolwich, Kent.

Blenheim converted to screw propulsion in 1847.

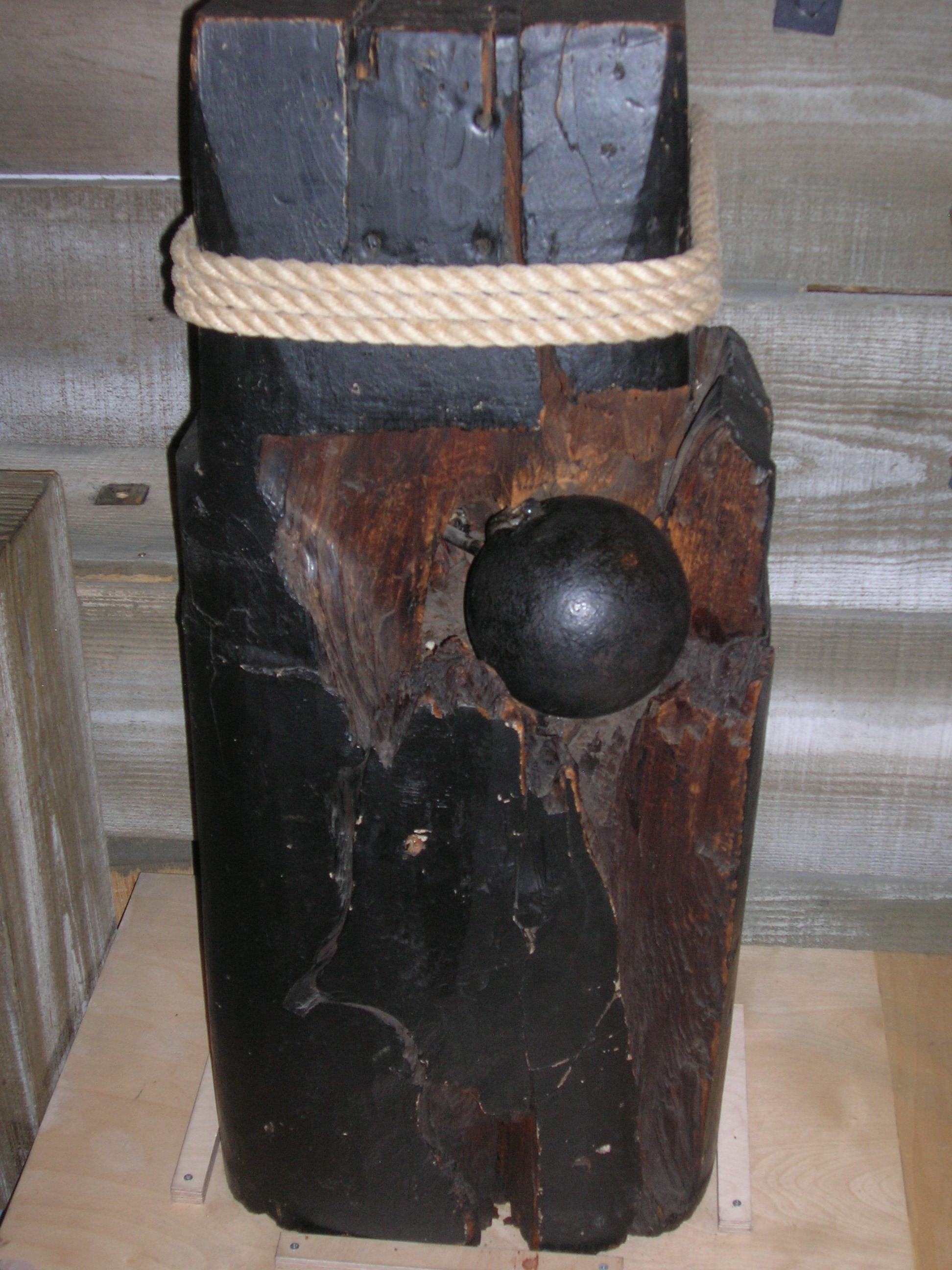
Mast with cannonball from 1855, on exhibit at the National Maritime Museum, Greenwich

In 1854–1855 Blenheim saw service in the Baltic Sea as a 60-gun steam screw vessel. During this service a 32-pounder cannonball struck and became embedded in her mast in 1855.

In March 1862, while stationed in Milford Haven and commanded by Lord Frederick Herbert Kerr, a boat containing men from the Blenheim was drawn in by the screws of the SS Great Eastern after a failed attempt to berth her after being moved to nearby Neyland. This resulted in the drowning of two crew men. Shortly after the SS Great Eastern collided with HMS Blenheim and took of her bow sprit, jib-boom, and foreyard.

Blenheim was broken up in 1865.

== See also ==
- Patricio Lynch, Chilean sailor on the Blenheim
