= Old Protestant Cemetery (Macau) =

Cemetery in Macau

Coordinates: 22°11′59.63″N 113°32′24.71″E

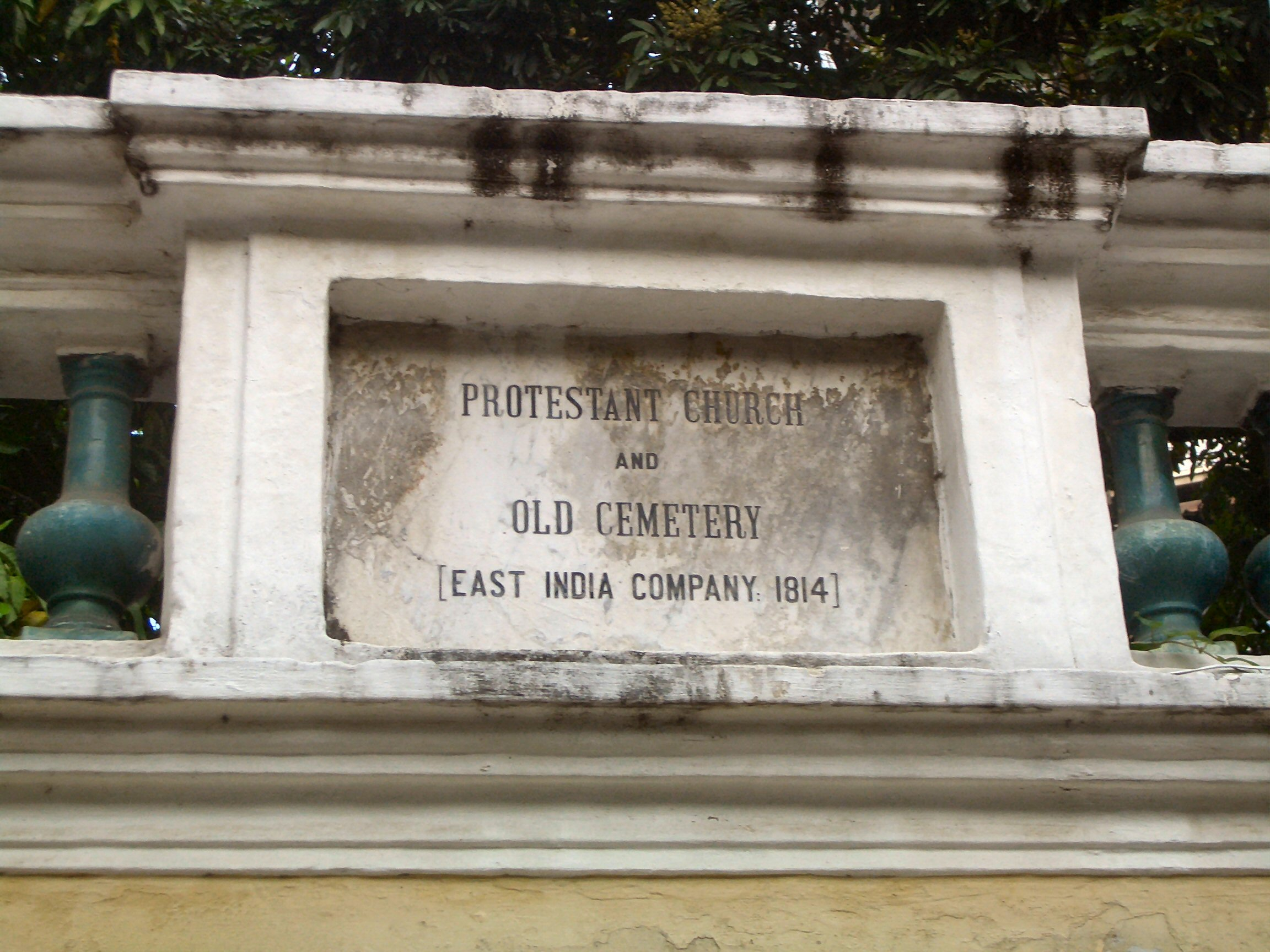
- Sign above the entrance to the Protestant Cemetery in Macau.

Chinese name
- Traditional Chinese: 基督教墳場
- Simplified Chinese: 基督教坟场
Transcriptions
Standard Mandarin
- Hanyu Pinyin: Jīdūjiào Fénchǎng
Yue: Cantonese
- Jyutping: gei1 duk1 gaau3 fan4 coeng4

Portuguese name
- Portuguese: Cemitério Protestante

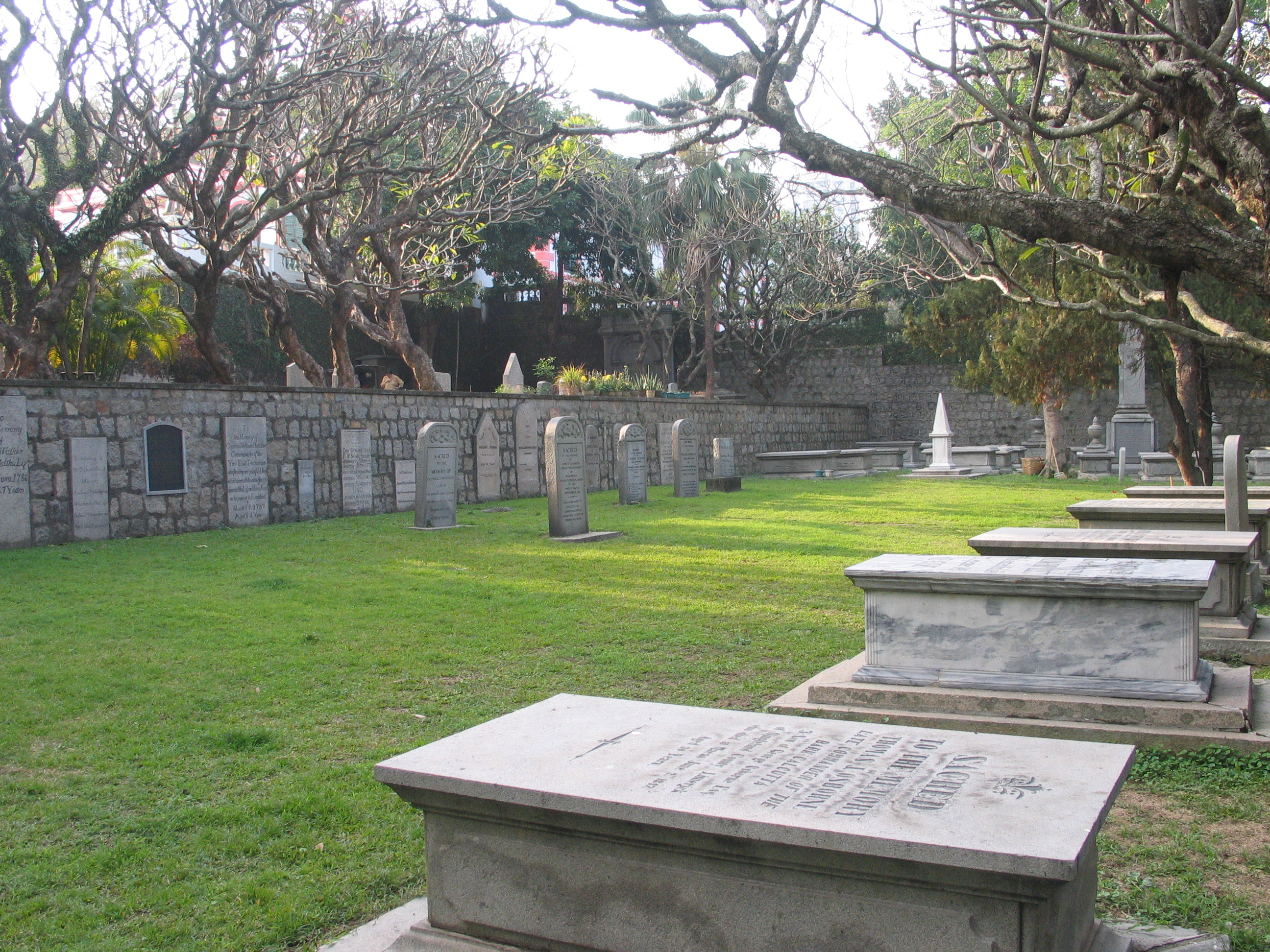
A view of the cemetery.

The Old Protestant Cemetery (Chinese: 基督教墳場; Portuguese: Cemitério Protestante) is a cemetery in Santo António, Macau, China. It was established by the British East India Company in 1821 in Portuguese Macau in response to a lack of burial sites for Protestants in the Roman Catholic Portuguese colony.

It is the last resting place of the artist George Chinnery, missionaries Robert Morrison and Samuel Dyer (his wife Maria is buried at the Old Protestant Cemetery in Penang), Royal Navy captain Henry John Spencer-Churchill (son of the 5th Duke of Marlborough and great-great-granduncle of Winston Churchill) and US Naval Lieutenant Joseph Harod Adams (grandson of the second president of the United States, John Adams, and nephew of the sixth, John Quincy Adams). Humphrey Fleming Senhouse, a captain in the Royal Navy, is also buried here, as is John Robert Morrison, son of Robert Morrison, who was appointed as Acting Colonial Secretary of Hong Kong but died eight days later in Macau from fever. William Napier, 9th Lord Napier was buried in the cemetery but his body was subsequently exhumed and reburied in Scotland. Another grave is that of Anders Ljungstedt, a prosperous Swedish businessman, interpreter and historian.

In 2005, the cemetery was officially enlisted as part of the UNESCO World Heritage Site Historic Center of Macau.

== History ==
Macau was considered by the Portuguese to be sacred Roman Catholic ground and the authorities barred the burial of Protestants within its city walls, whilst on the other side of the barrier gate the Chinese were equally as intolerant of the burial of foreigners in its soil. This left the Protestant community of British, American and Northern European traders with the only option of a secret night-time burial in the land between the city walls and the barrier gate, and the risk of confrontation with Chinese should they be discovered, or worse, desecration of the grave once they had gone.

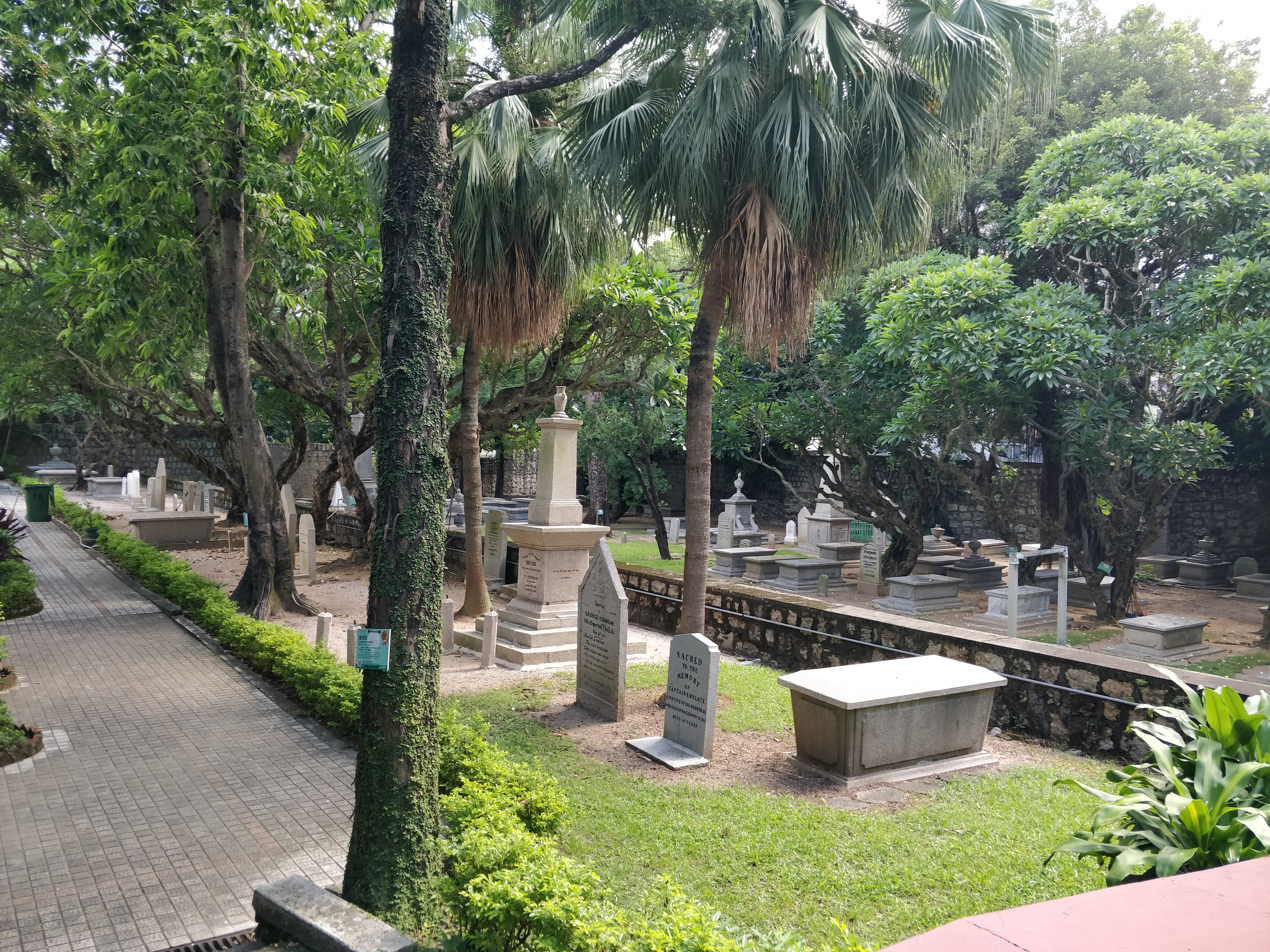
A view from the entrance

The matter was finally resolved in 1821 after the death of Robert Morrison's wife, Mary, when the local committee of the East India Company voted to purchase a plot of land next to the Company's headquarters and resolve its legal status with the Portuguese such that the burial of British Protestants would be permitted there. Later, the East India Company allowed burial of all Protestants, and several graves were moved from other locations outside the city walls into the cemetery, explaining why some graves are dated before its founding in 1821. Nationals of Britain, the United States of America, the Netherlands, Denmark, Sweden, Armenia and Germany are buried there. The cemetery, is divided into two levels, which are surrounded by mature trees. The upper level, with 40 memorials, contains the most recent burials, those between 1850 and 1859. The lower terrace, with 122 memorials, has the earlier burials.

The cemetery was closed in 1858 after a new plot was purchased at a public auction in response to the decision by the Portuguese authorities that all burials should take place outside the city walls. It then began to be referred to as the "Old" Protestant Cemetery. In 1971, 22 memorials that had been found lying in the New Cemetery were set into a wall in the Old Cemetery. In 1977, the ashes of Lindsay Ride, who conducted considerable research on the cemetery and its occupants, were scattered there and a memorial to him was erected.

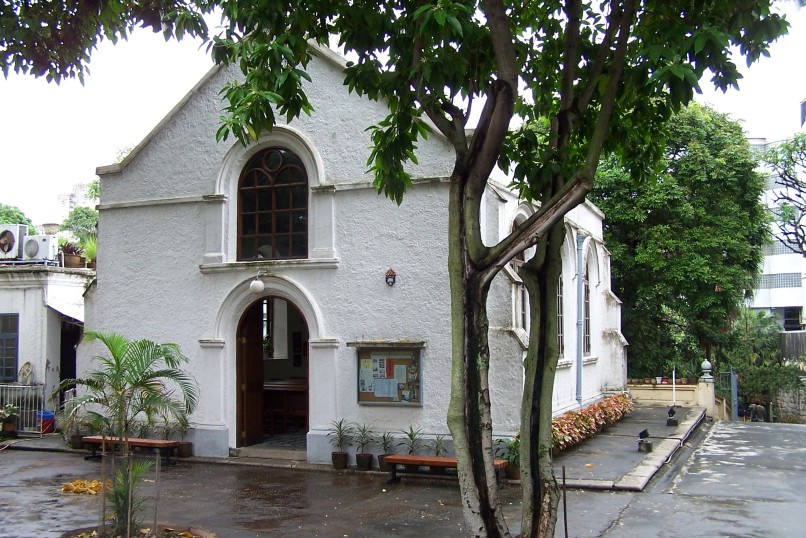
Morrison Chapel

Adjoining the cemetery is the Morrison Chapel, named in honour of Robert Morrison. Although a consecrated building has probably been on the site since the cemetery was established, the present building dates back only to 1922: it was restored after World War II.

== See also ==
- List of cemeteries in Macau
- Religion in Macau
