= Listed buildings in Gosforth, Cumbria =

Gosforth is a civil parish in the Cumberland district, Cumbria, England. It contains 18 buildings that are recorded in the National Heritage List for England. Of these, one is listed at Grade I, the highest of the three grades, three are at Grade II*, the middle grade, and the others are at Grade II, the lowest grade. The parish contains the village of Gosforth and the surrounding countryside. The listed buildings include houses and associated structures, farmhouses, farm buildings, a church and structures in the churchyard, a boundary stone, and a milestone.

== Key ==
Grade	Criteria
I	Buildings of exceptional interest, sometimes considered to be internationally important
II*	Particularly important buildings of more than special interest
II	Buildings of national importance and special interest

== Buildings ==
Name and location	Photograph	Date	Notes	Grade
St Mary's Church; 54.41921°N 3.43135°W		12th century	The earliest surviving parts of the church are Norman, including a doorway and the north arcade. Some reconstruction took place in 1789, but most of the present church is the result of significant rebuilding in Decorated style in 1896–99 by C. J. Ferguson. Also incorporated into the fabric of the church are medieval fragments including cross-heads and tomb slabs, and in a niche are two carved Viking hogback stones. The church is built in stone with slate roofs and stone ridges. It consists of a nave, a north aisle, a south porch, a chancel and north vestries. At the west end is a corbelled-out bellcote.	I
Library and part of Village Hall; 54.41862°N 3.43647°W	—	1628	Originally a house, later used as a library and as part of the village hall. The building is stuccoed with quoins and a slate roof. It has two storeys, with a main block of three bays, a lower single-bay wing to the right, and a rear wing of three bays. On the front of the main block are two plank doors, casement windows, one with a mullion, and continuous hood moulds. The bay to the right has a casement window and a small fire window. The rear wing is symmetrical with a central door, windows in chamfered surrounds, and hood moulds.	II*
Gosforth Hall; 54.41978°N 3.43237°W		1658	Originally a country house, it was extended in 1679. There have been later alterations, including the demolition of a wing, and the subsequent conversion into a hotel. The house is in stone and has slate roofs with copings, ball finials, and stone ridges. It has an L-shaped plan, two storeys with attics, and an east front of three bays. In the centre is a gabled porch and a chamfered doorway. The windows were originally mullioned and transomed, some are now blocked, and others contain sashes. In the roof are six upper-cruck trusses.	II*
Barn and stables, Gosforth Hall; 54.41974°N 3.43198°W	—	1658	The barn and attached stables are in stone with slate roofs. The barn has two storeys with moulded copings, and ball finials on the roof. On the south face are four plank doors and three windows in the ground floor, and a winnowing door and ventilation slits above, and at the rear is a wagon entrance. The stable has one storey, planks doors, and blocked openings.	II
Gate piers, Gosforth Hall; 54.41950°N 3.43225°W	—	1658	The two gate piers are square, in sandstone, and about 12 feet (3.7 m) high. The monolithic shafts have mouldings and a frieze with scroll decoration. The capitals are moulded and surmounted by a large ball finial on a moulded plinth.	II*
Sally Hill; 54.42802°N 3.45813°W	—	Late 17th to early 18th century (possibly)	A pebbledashed house with stone dressings, an eaves cornice, and a slate roof with copings. There are two storeys, a symmetrical front of three bays, and outshuts at the rear. On the front is a central porch, casement windows, and hood moulds, and above the doorway is a heptagonal sundial with a gnomon, an inscription and a date.	II
Ann Southward's tombstone 54.41906°N 3.43109°W	—	1711	The tombstone is in the churchyard of St Mary's Church. It consists of a slab with chamfered edges and a shaped top, measuring 2 feet (0.61 m) wide by 2.5 feet (0.76 m) high, and carries an inscription.	II
Thomas Dixon's tombstone 54.41910°N 3.43118°W	—	1729	The tombstone consists of a slab with an integral moulded plinth, 2.25 feet (0.69 m) wide by 3.75 feet (1.14 m) high. It contains an inscription between fluted pilasters, and has a segmental pediment including a winged head.	II
William Dixon's tombstone 54.41913°N 3.43109°W	—	1729	The tombstone is in the churchyard of St Mary's Church. It consists of a slab with an ornately shaped head. The slab is 2 feet (0.61 m) wide and 2.5 feet (0.76 m) high, and it carries an inscription.	II
Hallsenna, barn, stables and dovecote 54.39724°N 3.44412°W	—	Mid 18th century	The farmhouse and adjoining farm buildings are in stone with slate roofs. The house has two storeys and three bays, and a lower recessed single-bay extension to the north with a lean-to porch. The doorway and sash windows have stone surrounds. To the south is the four-bay barn and stable, which have a wagon entrance, plank doors, a winnowing door, ventilation slits, and external steps. An arch links it to a dovecote that has plank doors and dove openings.	II
Barn and stable, Sally Hill; 54.42803°N 3.45792°W	—	1773	The farm buildings are in stone and have a slate roof with coping to the south. They have an L-shaped plan, two storeys, two bays adjoining the house and a projecting bay. There is an elliptical-headed carriage arch, a plank door, steps leading up to a loft door, and another plank door in the projecting bay, this door having an inscribed and dated lintel.	II
Bolt How farmhouse 54.39518°N 3.42641°W	—	1799	The house is in stone with a stuccoed front on a chamfered plinth, with chamfered eaves, end pilasters, and a string course. It has a slate roof with coping at the west end. There are two storeys and a symmetrical front of three bays. The doorway has an architrave and the windows are sashes in stone surrounds. Above the door is a trompe-l'œil window and a dated plaque.	II
Hall Croft; 54.42268°N 3.42295°W	—	Late 18th to early 19th century	A stuccoed house on a plinth, with stone dressings, corner pilasters, a plain frieze, and a slate roof with coped gables. It has a double-depth plan, two storeys with an attic, three bays, and a rear wing. Two steps lead up to a central doorway with an open porch, and on the left side is a conservatory. The windows are sashes, and in the attic are round-headed windows. At the rear is a tall round-headed stair window with a keystone.	II
Milestone; 54.42017°N 3.44384°W		c. 1812 (possible)	The milestone consists of a sandstone block placed on the top of a wall. It has a trapezoid plan, and measures about 3 feet (0.91 m) long and 1 foot 3 inches (0.38 m) high. It inscribed with pointed hands, the names of destinations, and the distances in miles to Egremont, Kendal, Ravenglass, and to Ulverston.	II
Steelfield Hall; 54.42073°N 3.44161°W	—	c. 1840	A country house in Greek Doric style, it is stuccoed on a chamfered plinth, with string courses, a cornice, a blocking course, and a hipped slate roof with a central pediment. The house has a U-shaped plan, two storeys, and a symmetrical front of five bays. On the front is a central tetrastyle Greek Doric portico, and the windows are sashes with pedimented heads.	II
Gatepiers, Steelfield Hall; 54.41988°N 3.44294°W	—	c. 1840	The gate piers at the entrance to the drive consist of two monolithic Greek Doric columns, about 8 feet (2.4 m) high, surmounted by ball finials.	II
Boundary stone 54.43141°N 3.36318°W	—	Mid to late 19th century (probable)	The boundary stone consists of a monolithic block of sandstone about 2 feet (0.61 m) high with a semicircular head. It is inscribed with "GOSFORTH" on one face and "NETHER WASDALE" on the other.	II
Toolshed; 54.41987°N 3.43051°W	—	c. 1896 (probable)	The toolshed is in the corner of the churchyard of St Mary's Church. It is in stone, and incorporates medieval material, including three intact carved tomb slabs.	II
