= List of cemeteries in Macau =

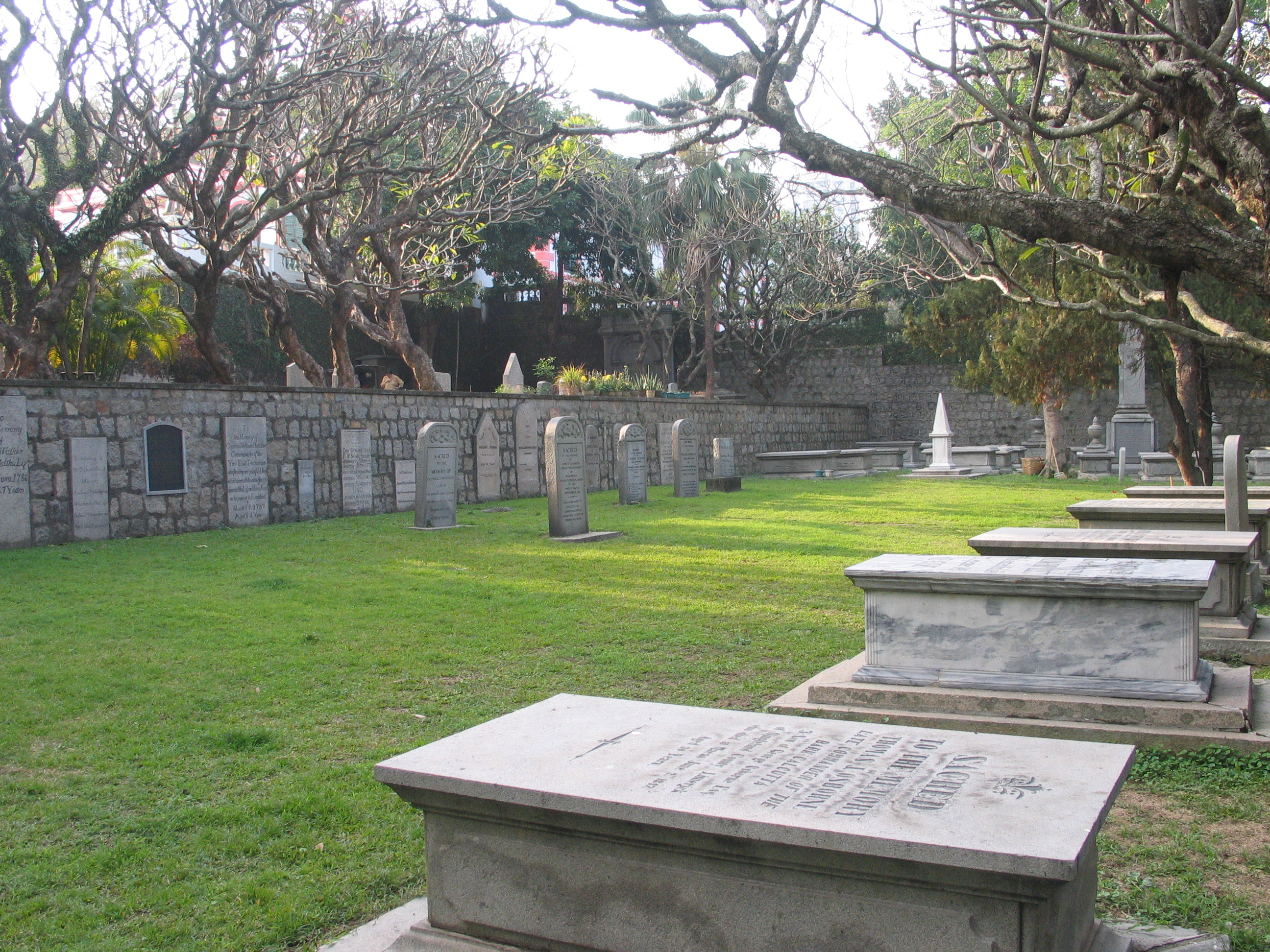
Old Protestant Cemetery

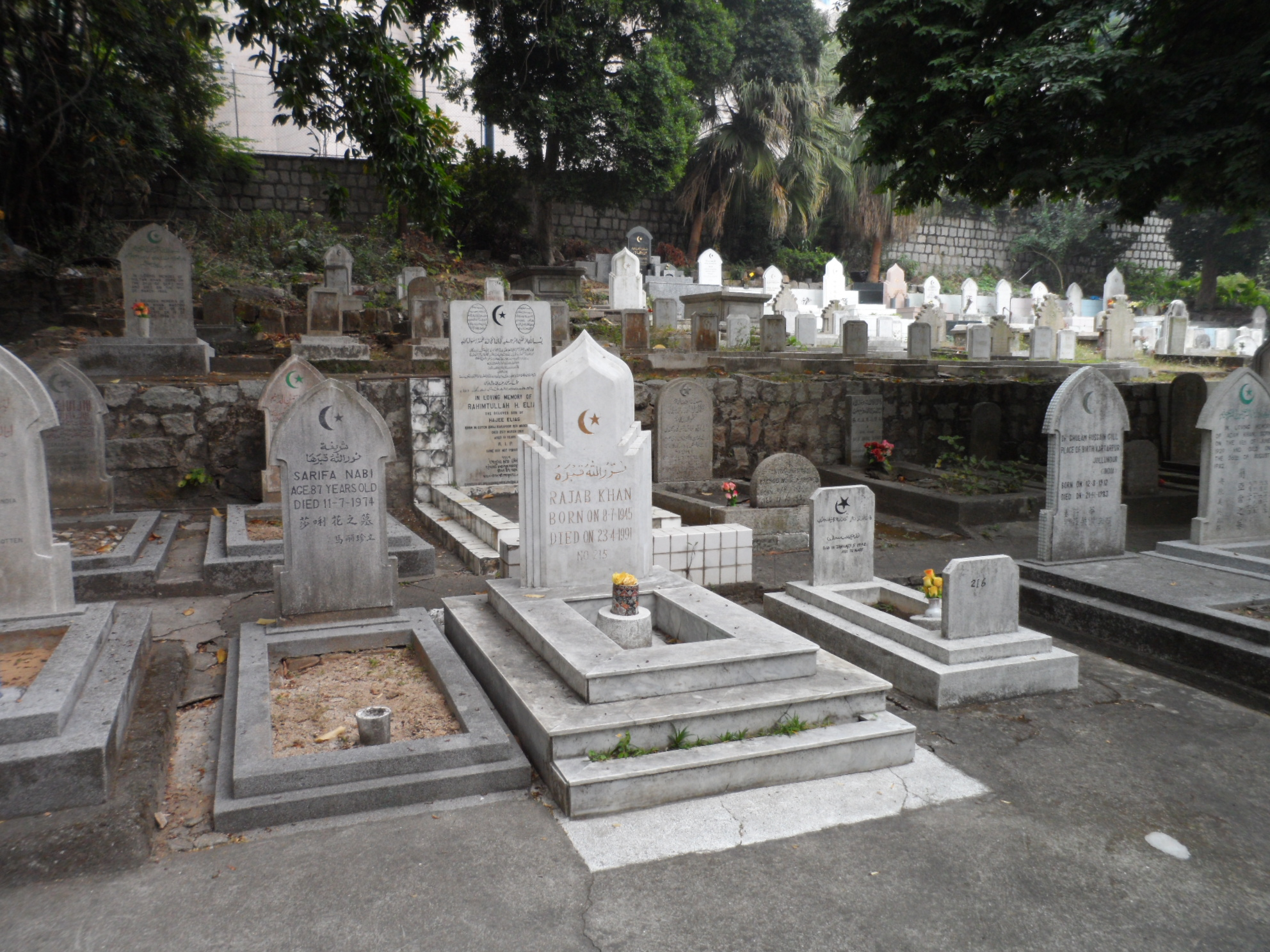
Muslim Cemetery

== Macau Peninsula ==
Land for cemeteries on mainland or peninsula were made available to the Europeans only.

- Old Protestant Cemetery
- Cemitério São Miguel Arcanjo – Saint Michael the Archangel Cemetery is the largest Catholic cemetery in Macau
- Cemitério Novo de Mong Há New Mong Há Cemetery
- Cemitério dos Parses Parsee Cemetery – established in 1822
- Macau Mosque and Cemetery (Mesquita e Cemiterio de Macau) – the only mosque and burial site of Macau's Muslim population
- Cemiterio De Nossa Senhora Da Piedade (Our Lady of Sorrows Cemetery) – Catholic Cemetery

== Coloane and Taipa ==
The cemeteries on Coloane and Taipa were used by the Chinese of Macau. Some cemeteries have a view of sea, something desired by the Chinese.

Coloane

- Cemitério Hac Sa – small cemetery located on the southern end of Coloane
- Cemiterio Sun I – small cemetery on the southern end of Coloane
- Cemiterio Unido das Associacoes de Coloane – small cemetery located on the southern end of Coloane

Taipa

- Cemiterio Municipal da Taipa – cemetery located on Taipa across from Edifício do Lago.
- Cemiterio de Budista (United Chinese Cemetery) – one of the largest cemeteries in Macau and used by Macau's Chinese of Confucian, Taoist and Buddhist faiths; located on the northern foot of the Taipa Grande Hill.

== Temples and Altars ==
For Chinese in Macau, the ashes of the deceased are not interred in cemeteries, but often placed in altars at various Buddhist temples throughout Macau.
