= HMS Wanderer (1806) =

Sloop of the Royal Navy

- Wanderer

History

United Kingdom
- Name: HMS Wanderer
- Ordered: 19 November 1805
- Builder: James Betts, Mistleythorn
- Laid down: February 1806
- Launched: 29 September 1806
- Fate: Sold 1817

United Kingdom
- Name: Wanderer
- Port of registry: London
- Acquired: 1817 by purchase
- Honours and awards: Naval General service Medal with clasp "Guadaloupe"
- Fate: Abandoned 26 October 1827

General characteristics
- Type: Cormorant-class ship-sloop
- Tons burthen: 43071/94, or 450 (bm)
- Length: 109 ft 3 in (33.3 m) (overall); 91 ft 6 in (27.9 m) (keel)
- Beam: 29 ft 9 in (9.1 m)
- Depth of hold: 9 ft 0 1/2 in (2.756 m)
- Propulsion: Sails
- Sail plan: Ship-sloop
- Complement: 121
- Armament: Upper deck:16 × 32-pounder carronades; QD:6 × 18-pounder carronades; Fc:2 × 6-pounder chase guns + 2 × 18-pounder carronades

HMS Wanderer was a Cormorant-class ship-sloop launched in 1806 for the Royal Navy. The Royal Navy sold her in 1817. She made one voyage between 1817 and 1820 as a whaler in the British southern whale fishery. She then sailed between Plymouth and North America until October 1827 when her crew had to abandon her at sea because she was waterlogged.

== Royal Navy career ==
Wanderer was commissioned in December 1806 under Commander Edward Crofton. She was designated for the North Sea Station in 1807.

Wanderer, Exertion, and Explosion were to join Admiral Thomas McNamara Russell in capturing the island of Heligoland. All three arrived on 6 September, the day of the formal acceptance by both sides of the articles of capitulation. (Note: Explosion grounded that same day and sank on 10 September.) Then on 24 October Wanderer recaptured Nancy.

On 3 July 1808, Wanderer was cruising with the schooners Subtle and Ballahoo, between the islands of Anguilla and Saint Martin. The small squadron attempted an attack on St. Martin with a view to reducing the number of havens available to French privateers, but unfortunately the opposition proved stronger than intelligence had suggested.

The attack was a debacle. A landing party of 38 seamen and marines from all three vessels, under Lieutenant George A. Spearing, captain of Subtle, succeeded in capturing a lower battery with few losses and spiking six guns. An attack on the upper fort failed, with Spearing being killed a few feet from the French ramparts. When the British withdrew to their boats the French captured them. In all, the British lost seven killed and 30 wounded, all the dead and most of the wounded being from Subtle. The French lost one man wounded.

Not surprisingly, French and British accounts differ substantially in several places. Crofton's account reports that the British landing party consisted of 153 men, and a French account talks of 200 men, all of whom were killed or captured, including Lieutenant George Mills, captain of Ballahoo. (The total establishment of the three British vessels amounted to about 190 men.) Crofton negotiated a truce under which he was able to reclaim all the prisoners who could be moved. Crofton claimed that the French had been forewarned and had 900 men in the fort. The French claimed the fort had a garrison of 28 regulars and 15 militia men. That the French permitted their British prisoners to leave is more consistent with the French figures on their numbers than the British. Crofton reported that the French buried the English dead with full military honors with both the fort and the British firing salutes.

On 5 October 1809 Wanderer was in company with Alcmene and Pelter and all three shared in proceeds of the capture of George. Prize money was forwarded in 1815 from the Vice admiralty court in Antigua.

In 1810 Wanderer was under the command of Commander William Robillard, in the Caribbean.

Wanderer also participated in the capture of Guadeloupe in January and February 1810. (Note: A first-class share of the prize money for Guadaloupe was worth £113 9s 1¼d; a sixth-class share, that of an ordinary seaman, was worth £1 9s 5½d.) In 1847 the Admiralty awarded the Naval General Service Medal with clasp "Guadaloupe" to all surviving participants of the campaign.

In 1811 the Navy reclassed her as sixth-rate post-ship. Captain Francis Newcombe took command in April 1811. Wanderer sailed with the Lisbon convoy on 17 June 1812, and then sailed for North America on 28 August. In December she captured the American brig Rising Hope, which had been sailing from Charleston to Cadiz. On 19 January 1813 Wanderer captured Three Friends.

On 14 March 1814 Wanderer was in company with Magicienne and so shared the prize and head money for the capture of the American letter of marque Adeline. (The Americans later recaptured Adeline.) (Note: Head money for 31 prisoners was paid in 1832. A first-class share was worth £12 2s 3¼d; a sixth-class share, that of an ordinary seaman, was worth 21s 1¼d.)

On 14 September an American privateer chased Lowjee Family off the Isles of Scilly as Lowjee Family was coming from Bombary. HMS Achates and Wanderer hove into sight and went after the privateer.

In October 1814 Wanderer was under the command of Captain John Palmer. Then in December Captain William Dowers sailed her in the Channel.

Disposal: The "Principal Officers and Commissioners of His Majesty's Navy" offered "Wanderer sloop, of 431 tons", lying at Plymouth, for sale on 18 September 1816. The Navy had difficulty selling Wanderer and listed her several times. The Navy finally succeeded in selling her on 6 March 1817 to a Mr. Splidt for £1,150.

Post script: In January 1819, the London Gazette reported that Parliament had voted a grant to all those who had served under the command of Lord Viscount Keith between 1813 and 1814. Wanderer was listed among the vessels that had served under Keith in 1813 and 1814. (Note: The money was paid in three tranches. For someone participating in the first through third tranches, a first-class share was worth £256 5s 9d; a sixth-class share was worth £4 6s 10d. For someone participating only in the second and third tranches a first-class share was worth £202 6s 8d; a sixth-class share was worth £5 0s 5d.)

== Mercantile career ==
Wanderer entered Lloyd's Register (LR) in 1818 with J. Dunn, master, W. Hodge, owner, and trade Plymouth-South Seas.

=== Whaler ===
Captain W. Dunn sailed from Plymouth on 27 August 1817 for the Pacific Ocean. Wanderer was reported to have been at Lima on 1 May 1818, and later was reported to be sailing near California with 1700 barrels of whale oil. She was reported lost on the California coast, but a later report stated that on 1 June 1820 she was "all well" at 29°0′S 43°0′W, i.e., 200 miles due south of Rio de Janeiro. Wanderer returned to Britain on 6 November 1820.

=== Merchantman ===
In 1821 W. Waygood replaced Dunn as master of Wanderer, and her trade changed to Plymouth-Quebec.

== Loss ==
As Captain Waygood and Wanderer were returning to Plymouth, Devon, from Quebec City, her crew was forced on 26 October 1827 to abandon her. A report in Lloyd's List (13 November 1827) stated that she was waterlogged off Newfoundland at 45°0′N 42°0′W and that Great Britain had rescued 11 survivors. Wanderer was last listed in LR for 1827.
