= HMS Port d'Espagne =

British naval vessel (1806–1811)

History

United Kingdom
- Name: HMS Port d'Espagne
- Builder: Port of Spain, Trinidad
- Launched: 1806
- Honours and awards: Naval General Service Medal with clasp "Martinique"
- Fate: Sold 1811

General characteristics
- Tons burthen: 190 (bm)
- Sail plan: Brig, sloop, or schooner
- Armament: 14 guns

HMS Port d'Espagne was a 14-gun vessel, variously described as a sloop, gun-brig or schooner, built in 1806 in Trinidad, whose citizens presented her to the crown. She captured several small Spanish privateers and participated in a major campaign before she was sold in 1811.

== Career ==
Lieutenant James Pattison Stewart was appointed acting commander of Port d'Espagne on the Trinidad station on 15 April 1806. (Note: For more on Lieutenant James Pattison Stewart see: O'Byrne, William R. (1849). "Stewart, James Pattison" . A Naval Biographical Dictionary. London: John Murray. p. 1116.)

On 27 February 1807 Port d'Espagne and the brig Express captured the brig Altrevido, Nichola Val Pardo, master. The schooner Ballahoo shared by agreement in the prize money due Express. (Note: The first-class share for Stewart was worth £23 8s 6 3/4d. The fifth-class shares, those of an able seaman, were worth 3s 8 1/4d to an able seaman on Port d'Espagne, and 2s 4d to an able seaman on Ballahoo or Express.)

Three months later, on 6 June, 25 men from Port d'Espagne, under the command of Lieutenant Hall, succeeded in capturing the Spanish privateer schooner Mercedes in the Gulf of Paria. Mercedes was armed with two guns and two swivel guns, and had a crew of 30 men. Hall used a captured Spanish schooner disguised as a neutral vessel to get close to the Mercedes. The British came alongside, under fire, and captured the Mercedes after a brief fight. British casualties were two men wounded; Spanish casualties were two killed, one drowned, and three wounded.

On 18 August Stewart and Port d'Espagne succeeded in capturing the Spanish privateer schooner Maria after a six-hour chase. She was armed with one long 18-pounder gun, had a crew of 74 men, was provisioned for a three-month cruise, and had left Margarita intending to cruise windward of Barbados. Stewart was particularly pleased to capture Maria as she was fast sailer in the Windward Islands and although on this cruise she had not made any captures, her captain had 14 years of successes in other privateers. Two days later, Ballahoo's boats, with the assistance of Maria, destroyed a small privateer in the Bay of San Juan.

Port d'Espagne and Ballahoo captured another small privateer, Rosario, on 12 September in the same bay. Rosario also was armed with one gun, and had a crew of 34, all of whom escaped on shore. Prize and head money for Mercede, Rosario, and the unnamed privateer were paid some 21 years later. (Note: The first-class shares were worth £43 4s 11 1/4d, £49 0s 3 1/4d, and £36 0s 9 1/4d. The fifth-class shares were worth 8s 10 1/4d, 9s 9d, and 4s 11 1/4d.)

Lastly, Port d'Espagna chased a privateer out of the Gulf of Paria and into the arms of the brig Attentive, which captured the Spaniard on 17 October. The Spanish privateer, of two guns, was the Nuestra Senora del Carmen.

In late 1808 Stewart transferred to Snap, which he commissioned on 13 November. His replacement on Port d'Espagne was Lieutenant David Kennedy, of Pompee.

Port d'Espagne participated in the British capture of the French and Dutch West Indies, including the capture of Martinique in February 1809. In 1847 the Admiralty authorized the issue of the Naval General Service Medal with the clasp "Martinique" to all remaining surviving claimants of that campaign.

Lieutenant Colin Campbell was appointed to the command of Port d'Espagne on 22 September 1809. His replacement, by exchange, was Lieutenant Donald Campbell, who assumed command on 29 March 1810, and left on 22 September.

On 21 October 1810, Lieutenant George Guy Burton became acting captain (pro tem) of Port d'Espagne. Commander James Black was promoted to Port d'Espagne with a commission dated 8 September 1810. It is not clear when he actually took command.

== Fate ==
Port d'Espagne was sold in 1811.
