= Anders Ljungstedt =

Swedish merchant and historian (1759–1835)

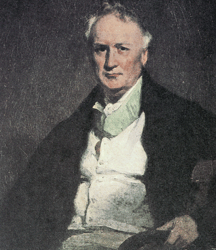
Portrait of Ljungstedt by George Chinnery, 1774–1852

Anders Ljungstedt (traditional Chinese: 龍思泰; simplified Chinese: 龙思泰; pinyin: Lóng Sītài; Jyutping: lung4 si1 taai3; 23 March 1759 – 10 November 1835) was a Swedish merchant and historian.

== Early career ==
Ljungstedt was born to a poor family in Linköping and attended Uppsala University for a time, but was forced to withdraw for lack of funds. In 1784, he went to Russia, where he worked as a teacher for ten years. Following his return to Sweden, he obtained employment in the Swedish government and served as Russian interpreter for king Gustav IV Adolf during his journey to Russia.

== Career in Macau ==
Ljungstedt was later hired by the Swedish East India Company, but after it folded, he moved to Macau, where he resided for the rest of his life working as a merchant. The King of Sweden later made him a Knight of the Order of Vasa, and in 1820 he was also appointed Sweden's first consul general in China. Ljungstedt took great interest in the history of Macau and he is famous for being the first Westerner to refute the Portuguese claim that the Ming dynasty had formally ceded sovereignty over Macau. Ljungstedt never returned to his native country and was buried in the Protestant cemetery in Macau. Today, a high school in Linköping bears his name and an avenue in Macau (Avenida Sir Anders Ljungstedt, 倫斯泰特大馬路, pinyin Lúnsītàitè dàmǎlù) was named in his honor in 1997 by the local Portuguese government.

== Sources ==
- Short biographic sketch from Projekt Runeberg

== Work ==
- Ljungstedt, Anders. An Historical Sketch of the Portuguese Settlements in China, and of the Roman Catholic Church and Mission in China; a Supplementary Chapter, Description of the City of Canton. Boston: James Munroe & Co., 1836. Reprint, Hong Kong: Viking Hong Kong Publications, 1992.
