= Gosforth, Cumbria =

Village in Cumbria, England

Coordinates: 54.41886°N 3.43408°W

Gosforth
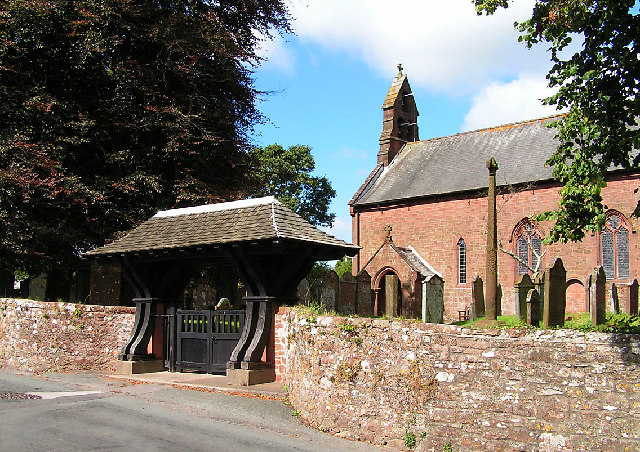
- Gosforth Parish Church

- Location within Cumbria
- Population: 1,396 (2011 including Ponsonby and Wasdale)
- OS grid reference: NY0603
- Civil parish: Gosforth
- Unitary authority: Cumberland
- Ceremonial county: Cumbria
- Region: North West
- Country: England
- Sovereign state: United Kingdom
- Post town: SEASCALE
- Postcode district: CA20
- Dialling code: 019467
- Police: Cumbria
- Fire: Cumbria
- Ambulance: North West
- UK Parliament: Whitehaven and Workington

Gosforth is a village, civil parish and electoral ward in Cumbria, England. It is situated on the A595 road between Whitehaven and Barrow-in-Furness, within the unitary authority area of Cumberland and on the western edge of the Lake District. It had a population of 1,230 at the 2001 Census. At the 2011 census Gosforth was grouped with Ponsonby and Wasdale giving a total population of 1,396.

Adjacent settlements include Whitehaven, Egremont, Ravenglass and Wasdale. The Cumbrian Coast railway can be accessed at Seascale.

== Viking heritage ==
Gosforth contains a unique collection of Norse artefacts in and around St. Mary's Church. This includes the Gosforth Cross, which is the tallest and oldest Viking cross in England. Another high cross was cut down in 1789 to make a sundial base, though the "fishing stone" panel from this survives in the church. There are also two large "hogback" tombs in the church.

== Gosforth Hall ==
Work began on Gosforth Hall, now a hotel and restaurant near St. Mary's Church, in 1658, by a local gentleman called Robert Copley. The date of completion is not clear, although the date on the coat of arms situated in the bar is 1673. Copley had previously refused to pay the royal herald for his own coat of arms and instead, made one up himself. In his history of The Gosforth District, Dr. C.A. Parker states that Robert Copley in 1658 built "a large handsome house with orchards and gardens suitable", and Parker states that henceforth the house was named Gosforth Hall. With the hall being within the precinct of the church, it was likely that evidence of earlier occupation might be discovered. In 2005, the present owners of Gosforth Hall commissioned a small archaeological excavation within the grounds. This turned up some interesting finds indicating previous occupation on the site. This preliminary work was followed up in 2008 with an archaeological desk-based assessment and field evaluation.

== Events ==
Gosforth is the base for two major athletic events each year, a 10-mile (16 km) run and associated fun run in June, and a 10-kilometre (6.2 mi) race on the first Tuesday in September.

The Gosforth and District Arts Society (GADAS) holds weekly meetings as well as an art exhibition every year over the August bank holiday in the village hall.

== Transport ==
The village has 1 bus route serving it run by Stagecoach. The X7 to Millom or Whitehaven.

== Gallery ==
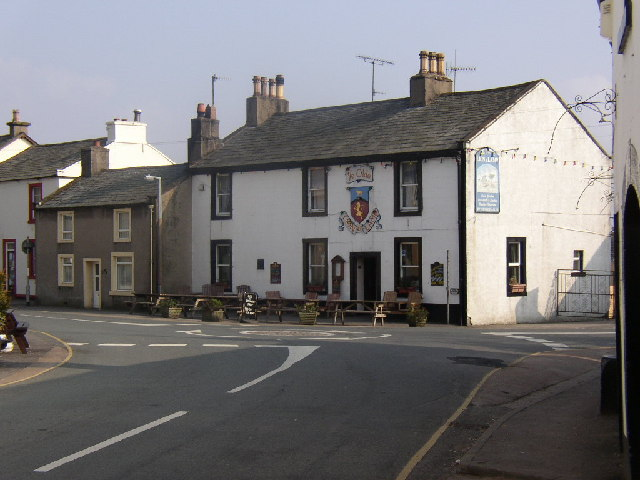
The Lion and the Lamb pub at the junction.

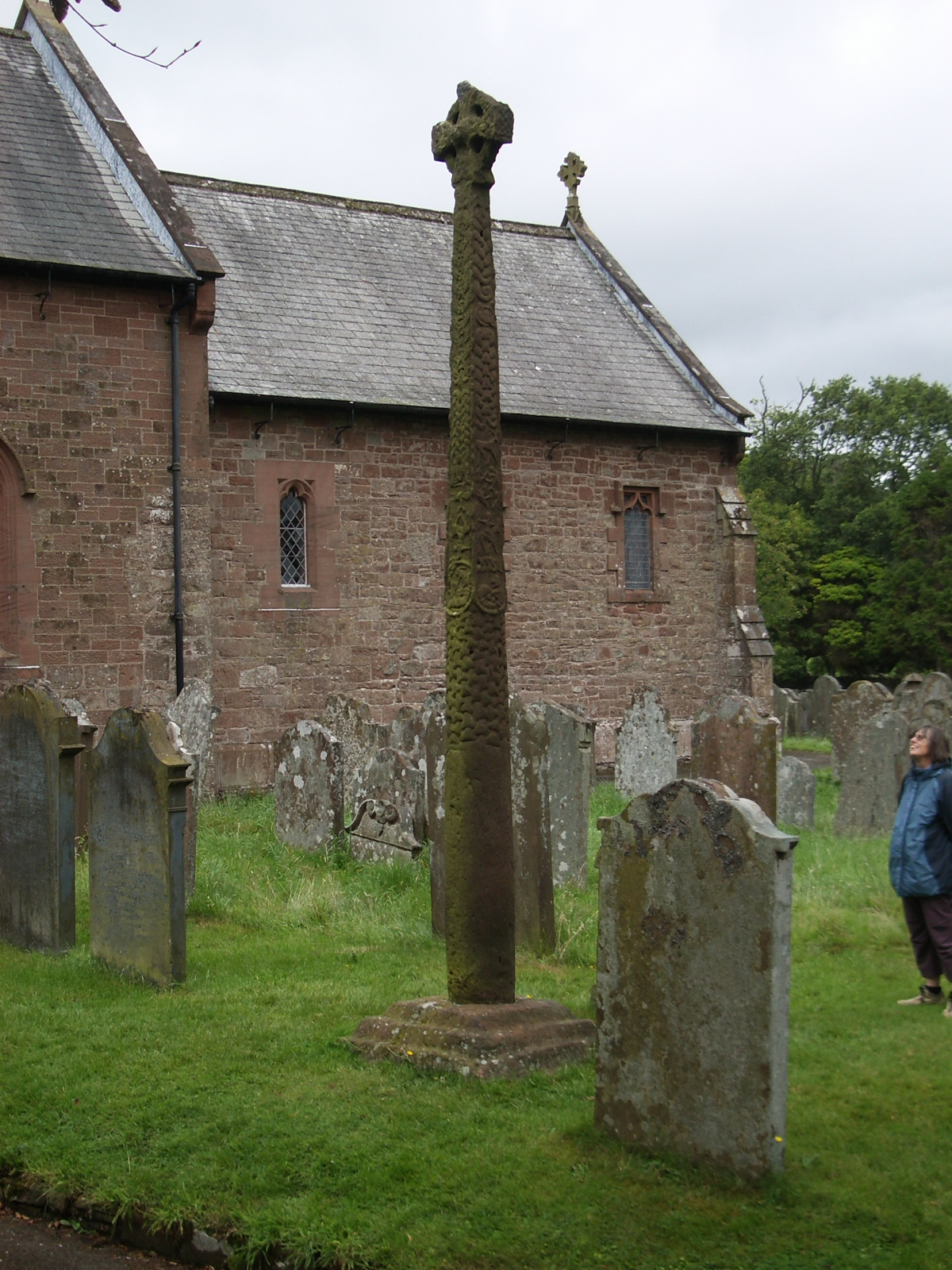
The Gosforth Cross beside St Mary's Church, Gosforth. It is over fourteen feet high.

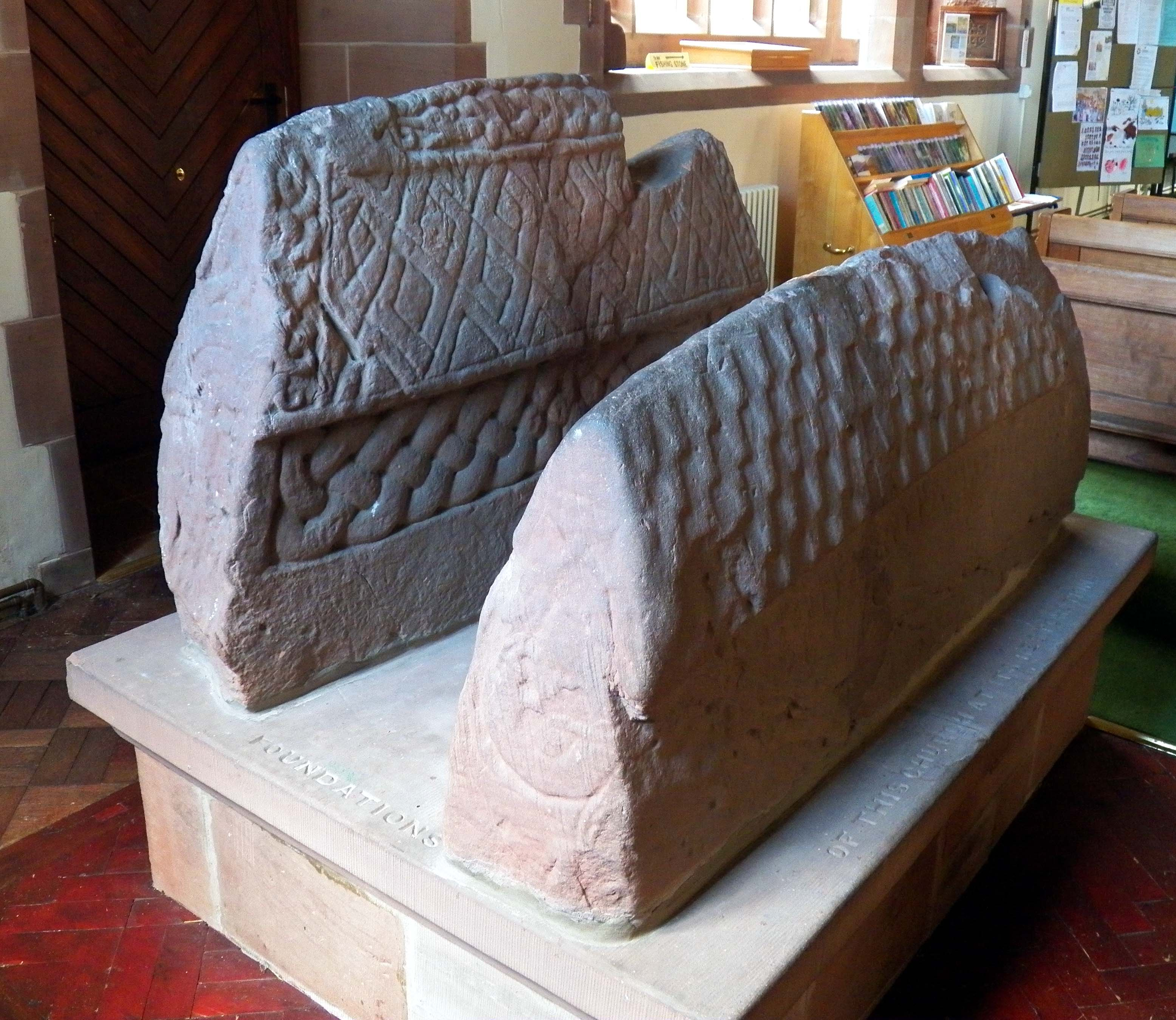
The two hogsback tomb markers now in the parish church, thought to be stylised "houses of the dead" with tiled roofs.

== See also ==
- Listed buildings in Gosforth, Cumbria
