= St Mary's Church, Gosforth =

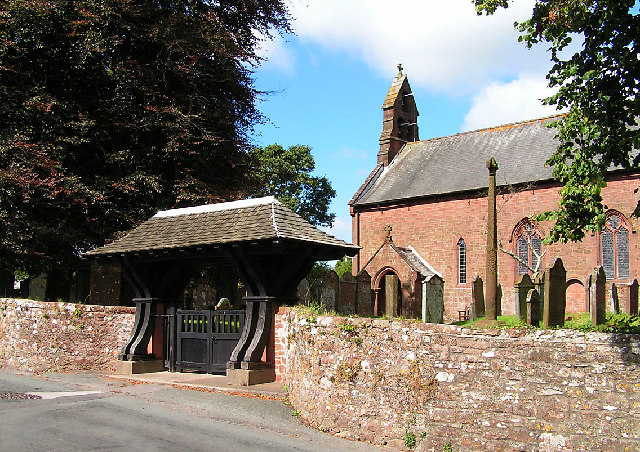
- West end of St Mary's Church, Gosforth, with the Gosforth Cross standing to the right of the porch

- Location in Cumbria
- 54.4192°N 3.4314°W
- OS grid reference: NY 072 036
- Location: Gosforth, Cumbria
- Country: England
- Denomination: Anglican
- Website: achurchnearyou.com/gosforth-st-mary

History
- Status: Parish church

Architecture
- Functional status: Active
- Heritage designation: Grade I
- Designated: 9 March 1967
- Architect: C. J. Ferguson
- Architectural type: Church
- Style: Norman, Gothic Revival
- Completed: 1899

Specifications
- Materials: Stone, slate roofs

Administration
- Province: York
- Diocese: Carlisle
- Archdeaconry: West Cumberland
- Deanery: Calder
- Parish: Gosforth

Clergy
- Priest: Revd Philip Dorling

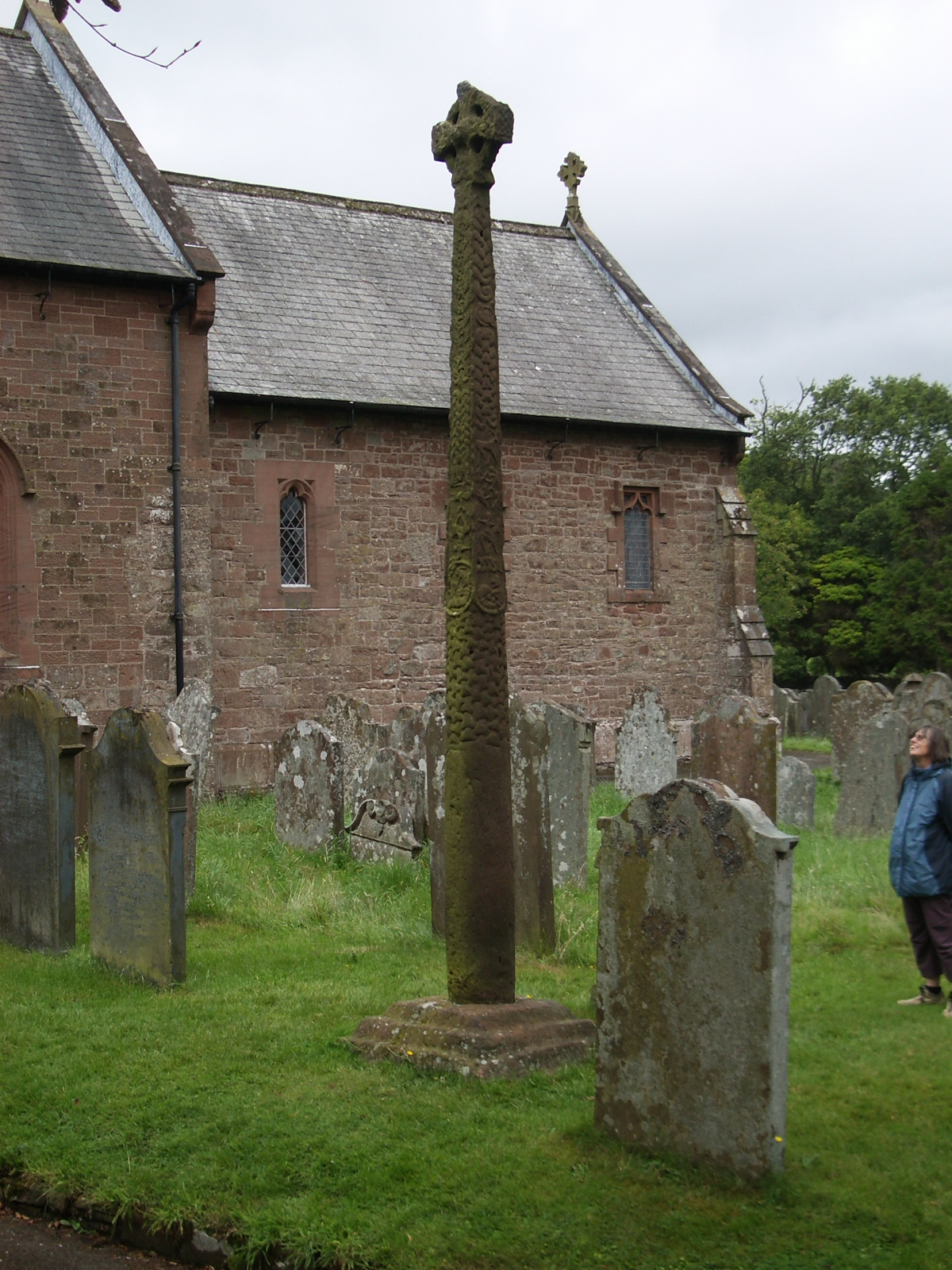
Gosforth Cross

St Mary's Church in the village of Gosforth, Cumbria, England, is an active Anglican parish church in the deanery of Calder, the archdeaconry of West Cumberland, and the diocese of Carlisle. Its benefice is united with those of St Olaf, Wasdale Head, and St Michael, Nether Wasdale. The church is recorded in the National Heritage List for England as a designated Grade I listed building. It is associated with "a unique Viking-age assemblage" of carved stones.

== History ==
This has been a Christian site since the 8th century. The oldest fabric in the present church dates from the 12th century. The church was reconstructed in 1789, but most of the fabric currently present is the result of a virtual rebuilding by C. J. Ferguson between 1896 and 1899.

== Architecture ==
St Mary's is constructed in stone with a slate roof. Its plan consists of a nave, a north aisle, a south porch, a chancel and north vestries. The 19th-century rebuilding is in Decorated style. At the west end is a corbelled-out bellcote. The gabled porch leads to the south door, to the right of which is a blocked Norman doorway, formerly on the north side of the church. There is a monument dated 1834 on the exterior of the north wall of the chancel.

Inside the church is a four-bay north arcade, consisting of pointed arches carried on columns with octagonal capitals. The 14th-century chancel arch is set on richly carved Norman capitals.

In a niche at the east end of the aisle are two carved Viking hogback stones. These are very rare pre-Norman tomb markers that were found under the foundations of a 12th-century wall of the church during restoration in 1896–97. The early 11th century is the latest possible date. The hogbacks are each in the shape of a house. The larger tomb has on its sides humans astride smaller serpents battling with larger serpents. The smaller stone has two armies thought to be concluding a truce.

In and around the niche and in the porch are other fragments of medieval stones. The small octagonal font dates from the 19th century. Also in the church is a Chinese bell dating from 1839, which was captured from the Anunghoy Fort in the Battle of the Bogue (1841) on the Canton River. It was donated to the church in 1844.

One of the stone slabs inside the church is the so-called Gosforth fishing stone, which is believed to be the same artist who carved the cross. It represents Thor and the giant Hymir fishing for Jörmungandr, the serpent which encircles the world, below a scene of a hart struggling with a serpent. It is possibly a remnant of another cross.

The stained glass, most of which is by Ward and Hughes, dates mainly from the late 19th century. The two-manual pipe organ was made by Conacher and Company of Huddersfield, and rebuilt and expanded in 1984 by Sixsmith.

== External features ==
The most important feature in the churchyard is the Gosforth Cross, a Viking stone cross dating from the early part of the 10th century. It is a sandstone structure standing 4.42 metres (14.5 ft) high, and is elaborately carved with human figures and beasts, mainly depicting scenes from Scandinavian mythology. This is the tallest Viking cross in the country. It is designated as a scheduled monument. Another cross of similar age has been cut down to form a sundial.

In the northeast corner of the churchyard is a hut or shed that has been constructed from left-over stones, including 13th-century grave-covers, pieces of stone carved with zigzags, and a corbel. The structure is listed at Grade II. Also in the churchyard are three tombstones bearing dates between 1711 and 1729, each of which has been listed at Grade II.

== Gallery ==
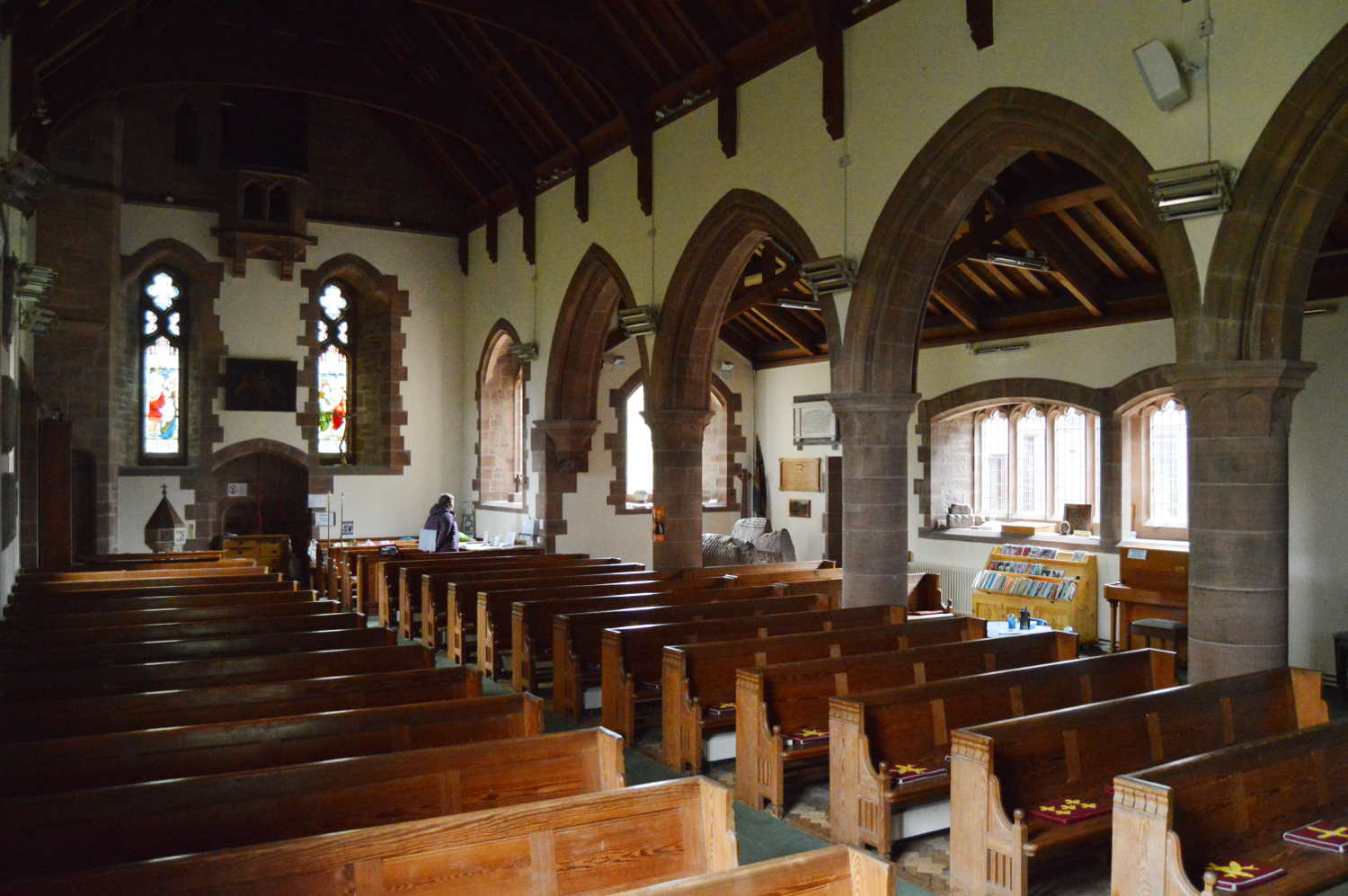
Interior view of St Mary's church, Gosforth, Cumbria.

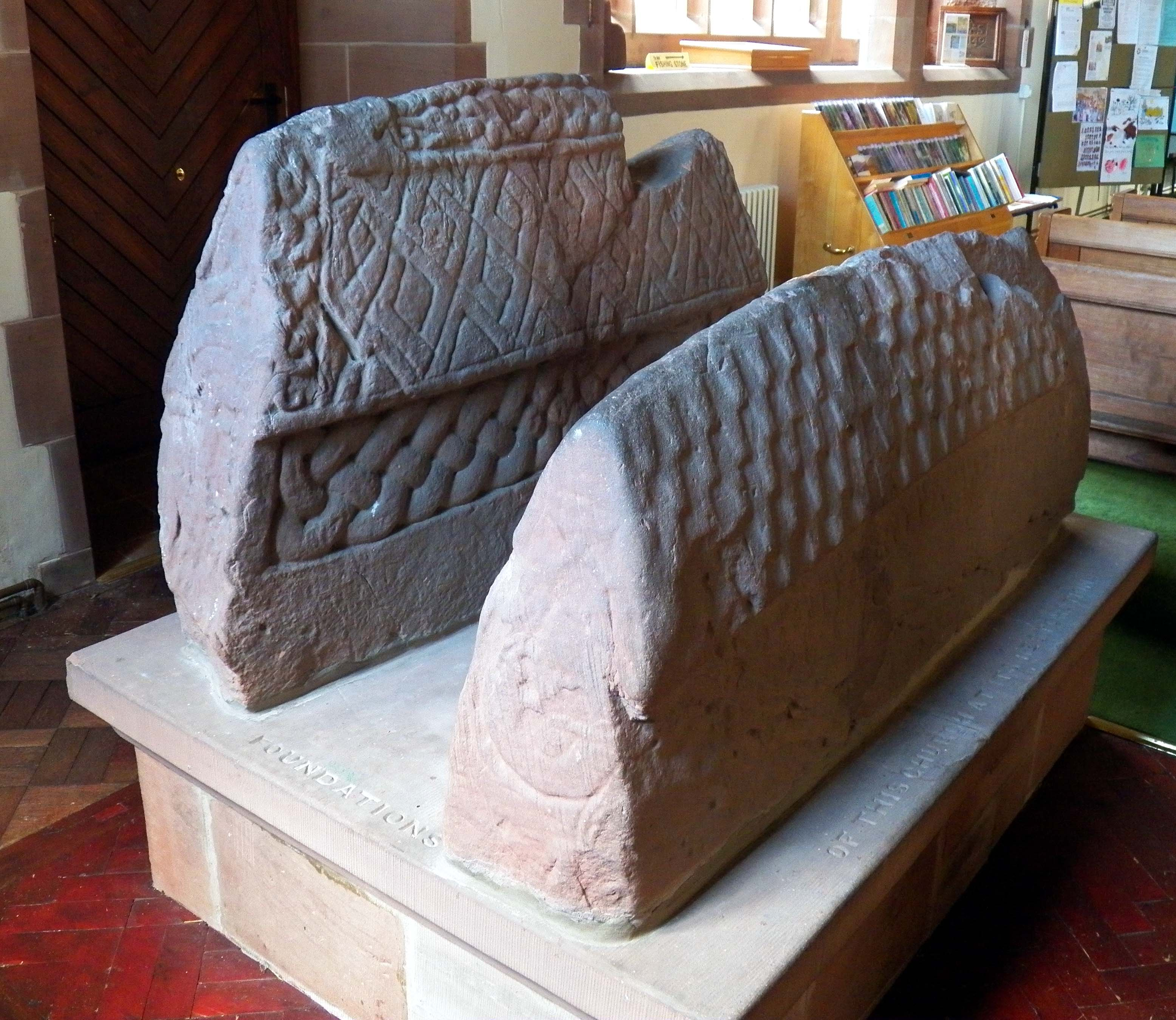
Hogback tombs in the church

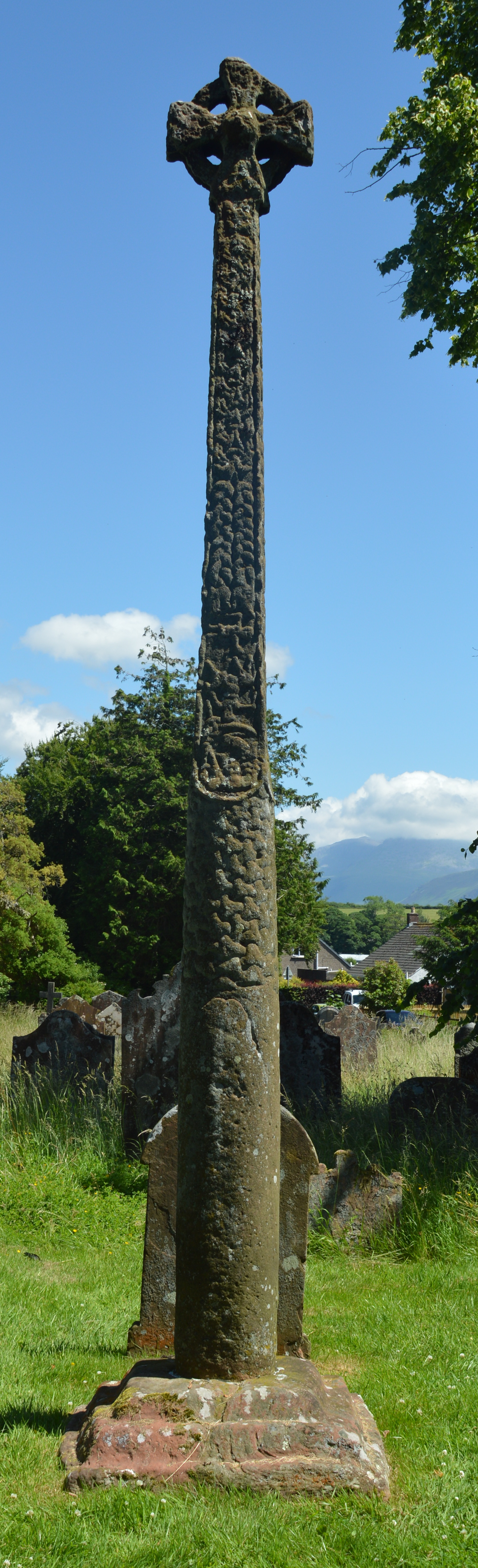
Gosforth High Cross

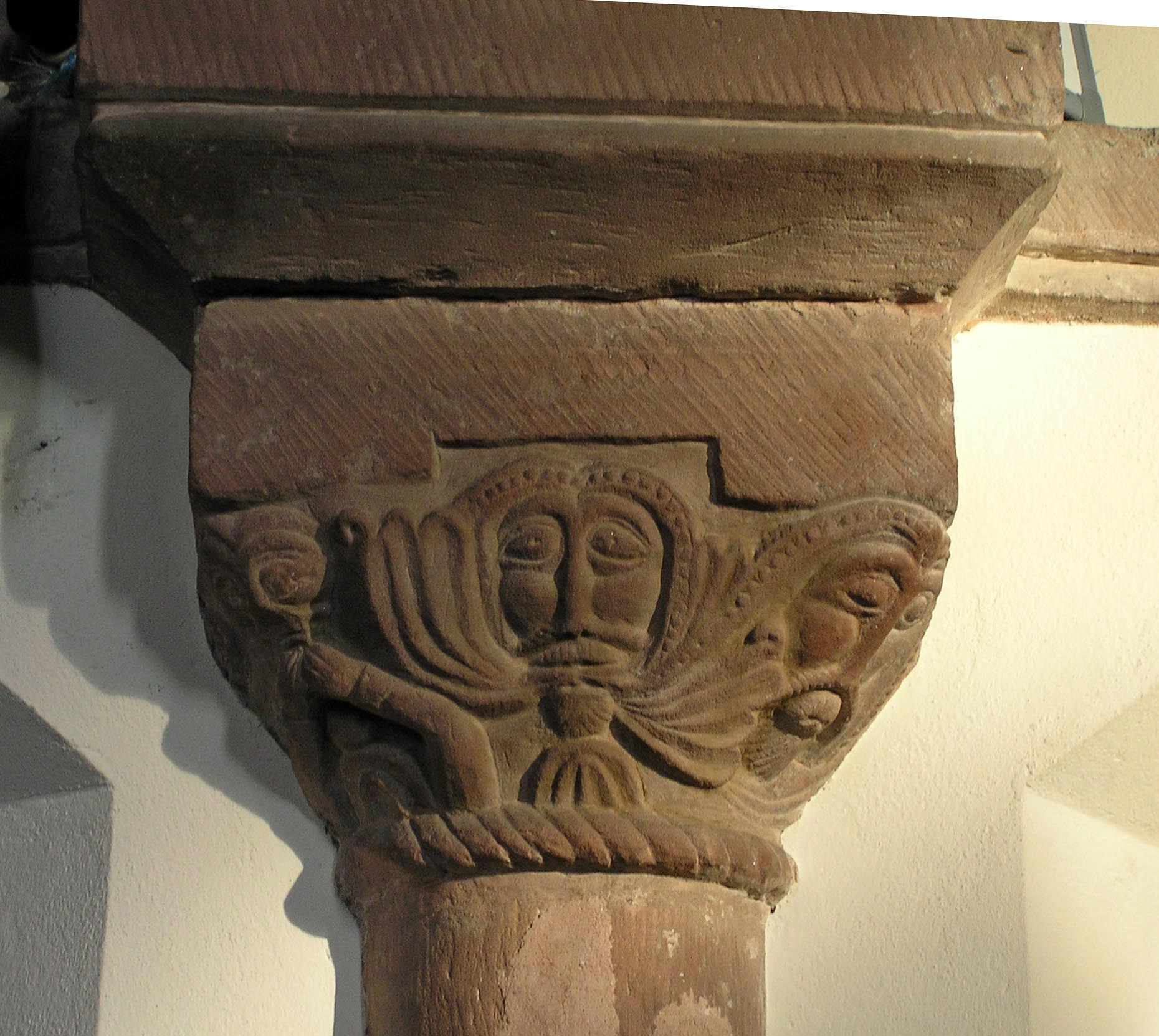
Norman capital with three faces

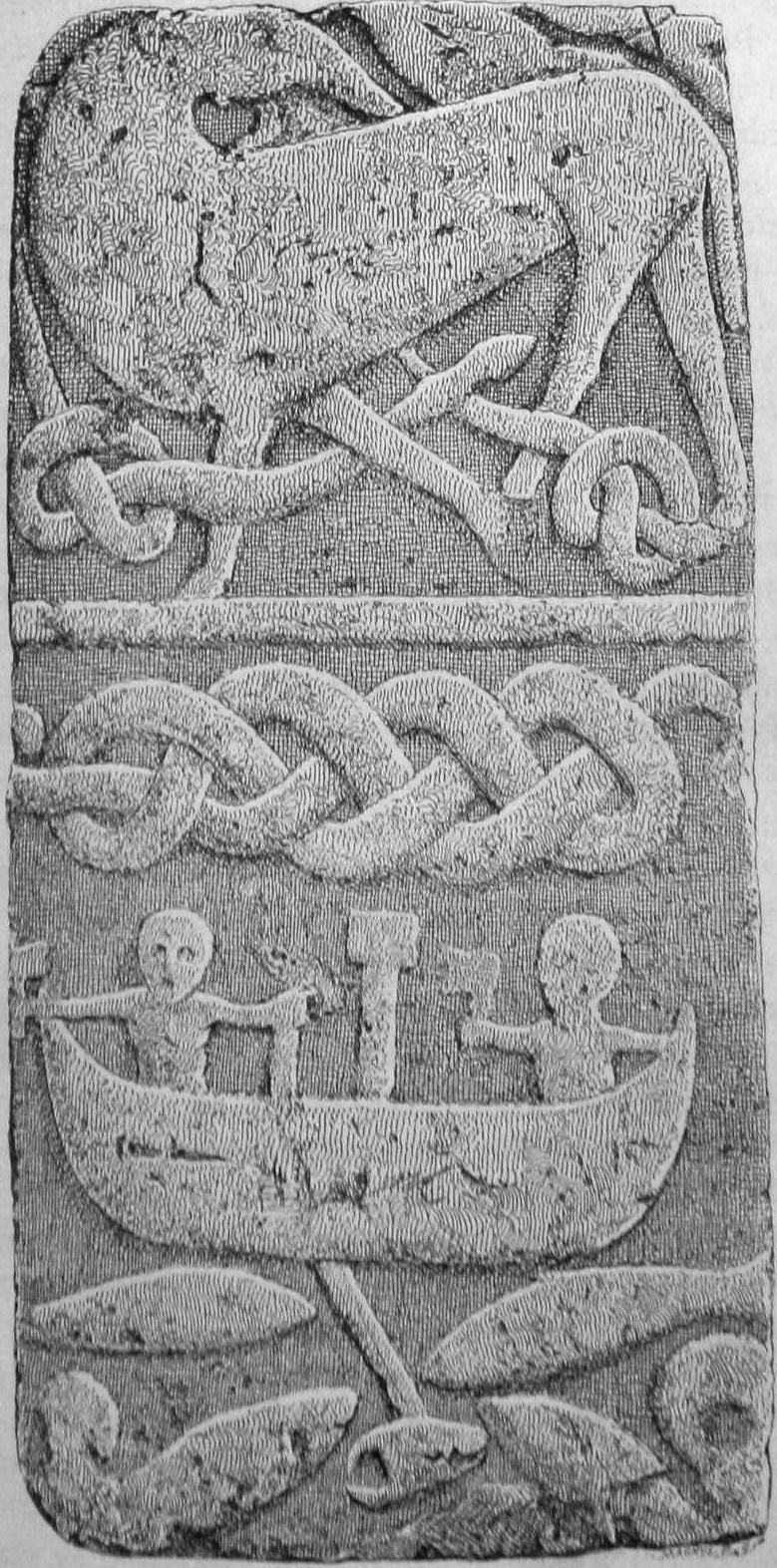
The "fishing stone" in the church; possibly remnant of a second cross, showing Thor fishing.

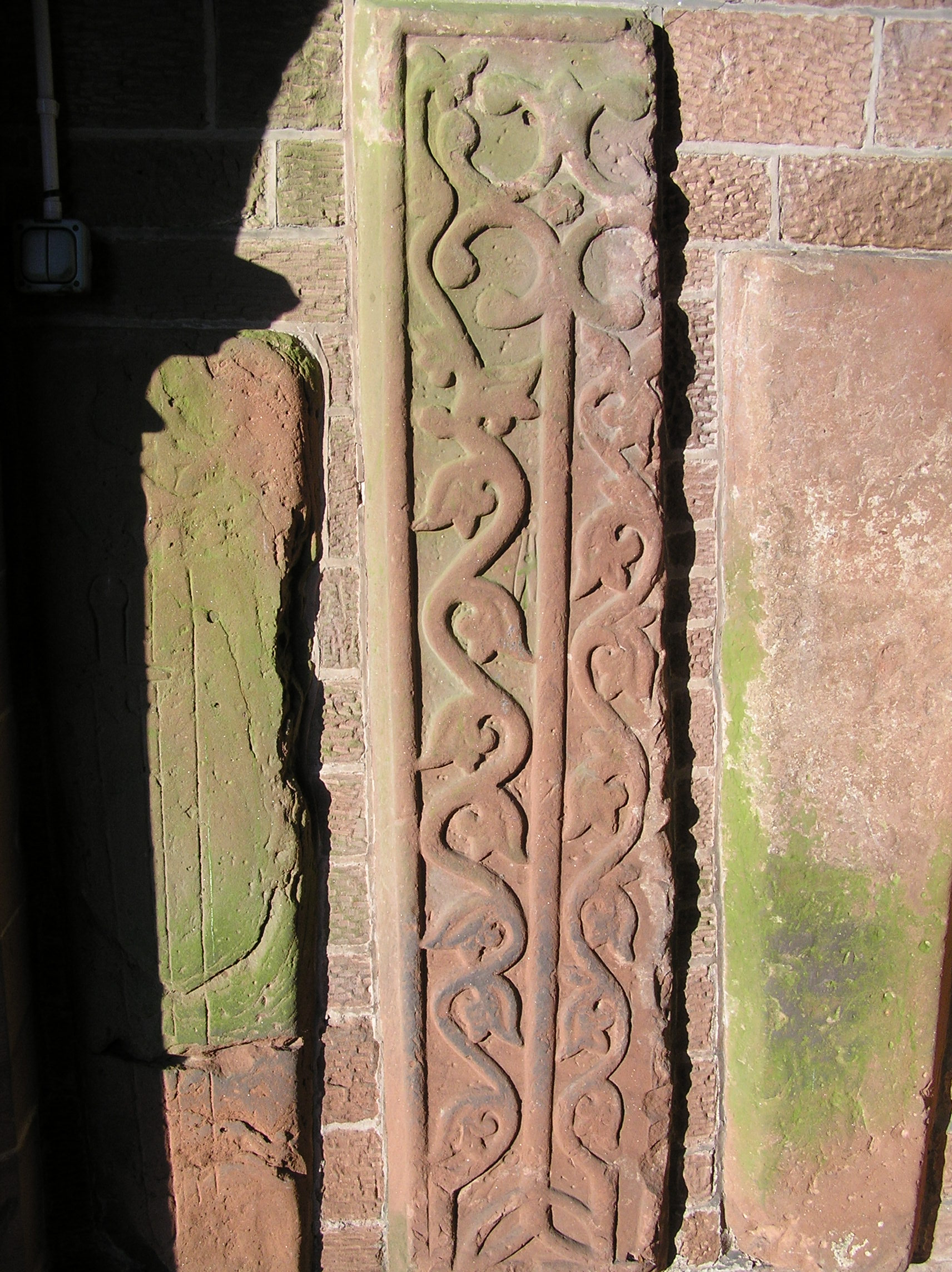
Tombs in the porch

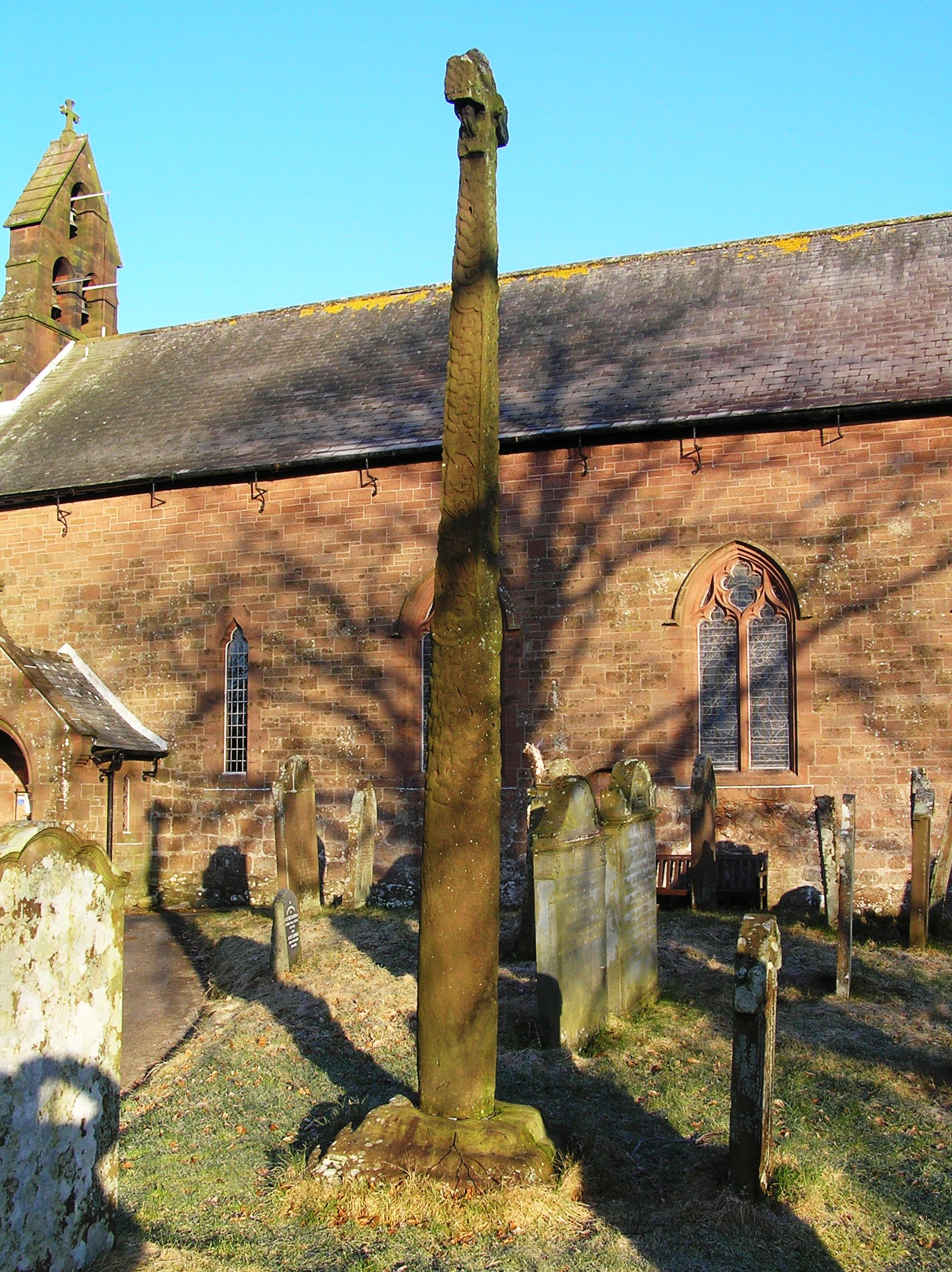
View of the Viking Cross and church, from the SW

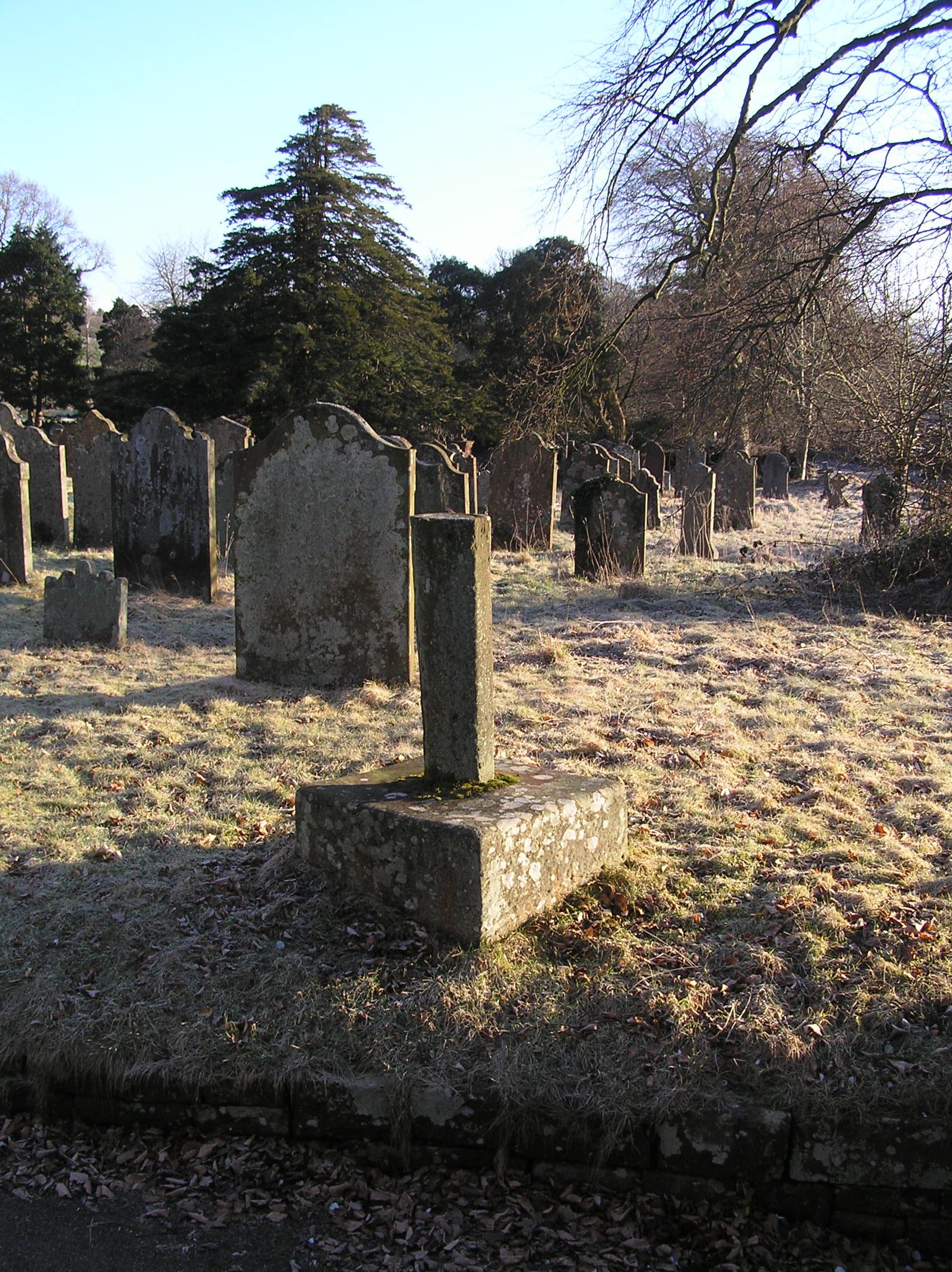
The stump of the second cross

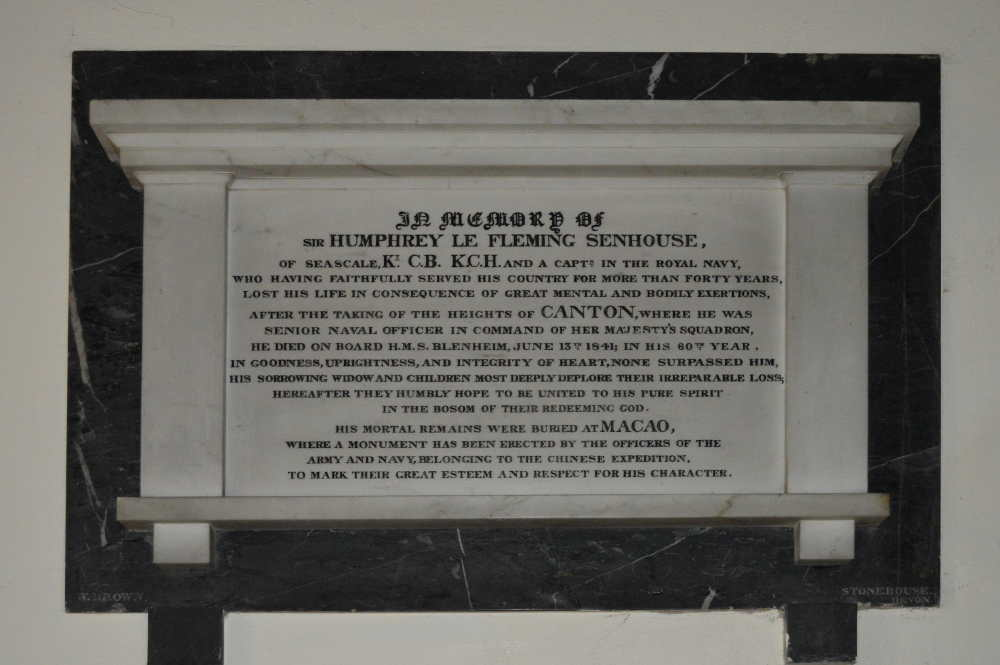
Memorial to Humphrey Senhouse, Gosforth, Cumbria

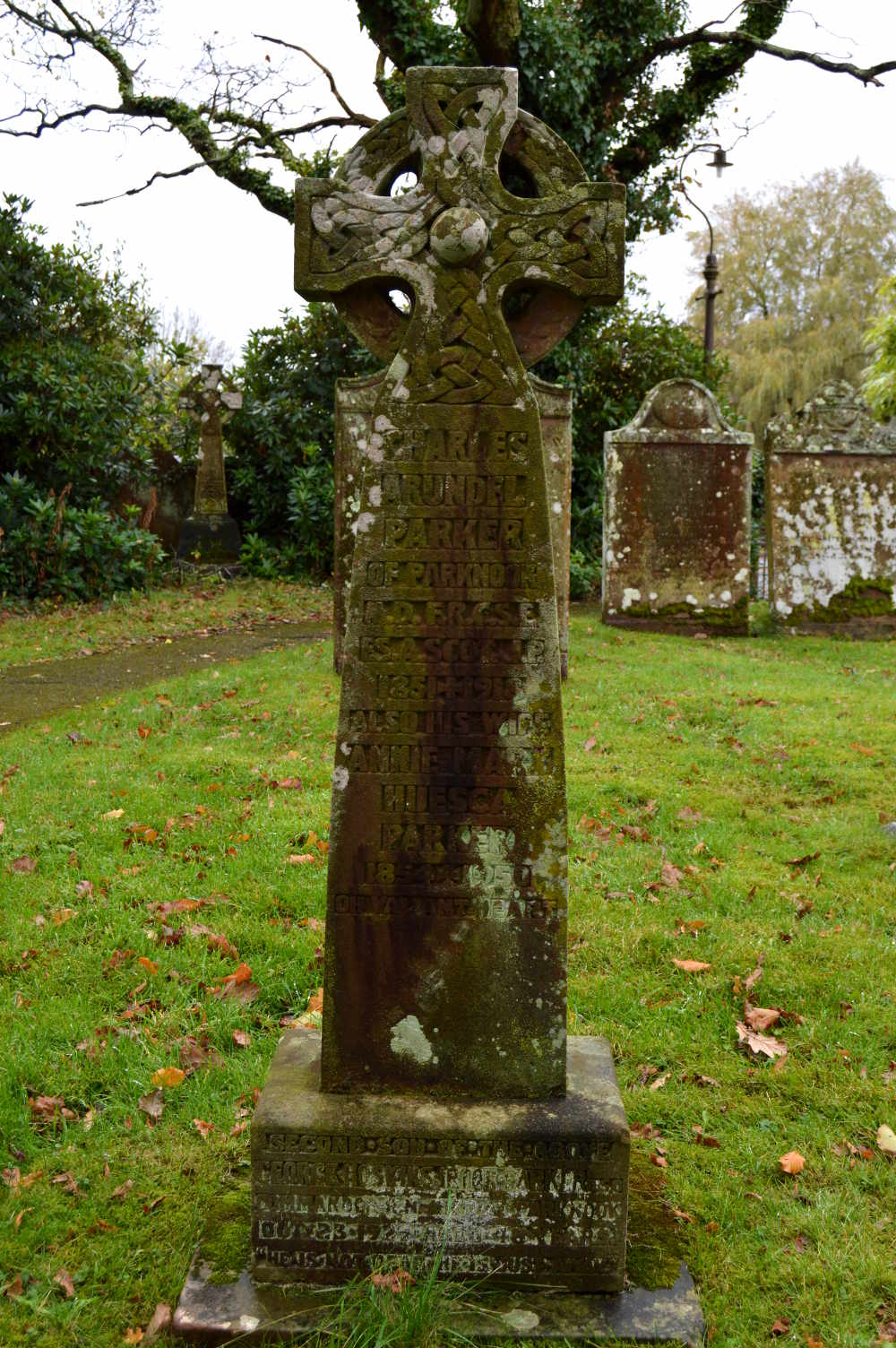
The grave of local antiquarian and historian, Charles Arundel Parker.

== See also ==
- Bewcastle Cross
- Ruthwell Cross
- Grade I listed churches in Cumbria
- Grade I listed buildings in Cumbria
- Listed buildings in Gosforth, Cumbria
