= Eaton Stannard Travers =

British Royal Navy rear admiral

Rear-Admiral Sir Eaton Stannard Travers
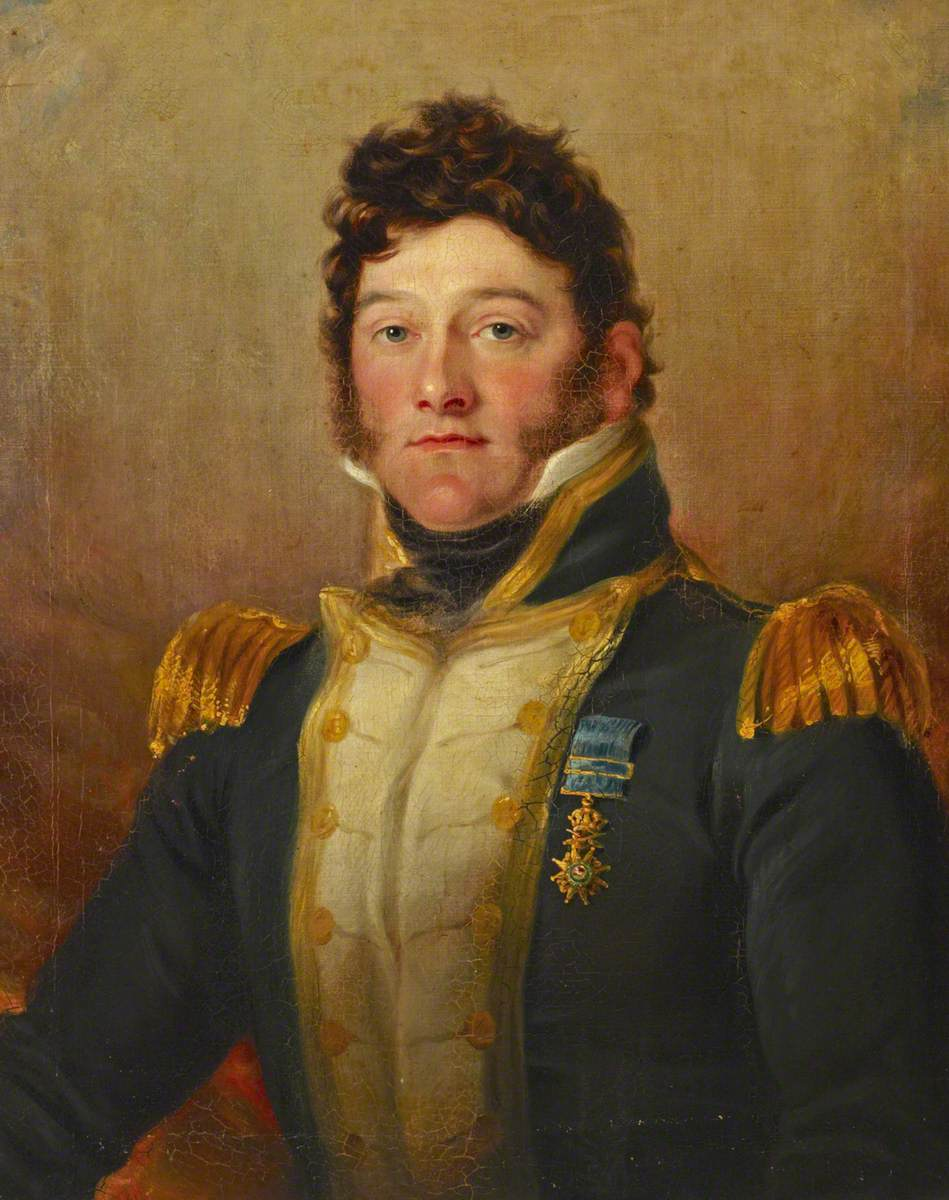
- Born: 1782
- Died: 4 March 1858 (aged 75–76)
- Occupation: Royal Navy rear-admiral

Sir Eaton Stannard Travers (17 October 1777 – 4 March 1858) was a British Royal Navy rear admiral.

== Biography ==
Travers was born in 1777. He was third son of John Travers of Hettyfield, Grange, co. Cork. Before entering the navy in September 1798 on board the Juno in the North Sea, he was a volunteer in the East India Company's sea service and was present at the taking of the Cape of Good Hope in 1795. In 1799 he was actively engaged in boat service along the coast of Holland and was later awarded a clasp to his Naval General Service Medal for the attack on and capture of the Dutch brig 'Crash' on 12 August at Schiermonnikoog in the West Frisian Islands. He was similarly employed in the West Indies during 1800–1801. In March 1802 he was moved to the Elephant, and in October 1803 to the Hercule, then carrying the flag of Sir John Duckworth. In November, Duckworth remaining at Jamaica, the Hercule was attached to the squadron under Commodore Loring, blockading Cape Français. On 30 November, when the French ships agreed to surrender, Travers was with Lieutenant Nisbet Josiah Willoughby in the launch which took possession of the Clorinde after she had got on shore, and claimed to have been the chief agent in saving the ship by swimming to the shore and so making fast a hawser, by which the frigate was hauled off the rocks. In January and February 1804 he was again with Willoughby in the advance battery at the siege of Curaçao, and was afterwards publicly thanked by the admiral for his gallantry and good conduct. On 23 September 1804 he was promoted to be lieutenant and to command the schooner Ballahou; but in February 1805, on her being ordered to Newfoundland, Travers was appointed to the Surveillante, in which again he saw some very active and sharp boat service on the Spanish Main.

In 1806 the Hercule returned to England, and in December Travers was appointed to the Alcmène frigate, employed on the coast of France till she was wrecked off the mouth of the Loire on 29 April 1809. He was afterwards in the Impérieuse, in the Walcheren expedition, and in 1810 in the Mediterranean, where for the next four years he was almost incessantly engaged in minor operations against the enemy's coasting vessels and coast batteries along the shores of France and Italy. By his captains and the commander-in-chief he was repeatedly recommended for his zeal, activity, and gallantry; but it was not till 15 June 1814 that he received the often-earned promotion to the rank of commander. He is said ‘to have been upwards of 100 times engaged with the enemy; to have been in command at the blowing up and destruction of eight batteries and three martello-towers; and to have taken part in the capture of about 60 vessels, 18 or 20 of them armed, and several cut out from under batteries.’

The Impérieuse was paid off in September 1814, and Travers was left unemployed till the summer of 1828, when he was appointed to command the Rose. From her he was advanced to post rank on 19 November 1829, mainly, it would seem, at the desire of the Duke of Clarence, who had been made acquainted with his long and peculiarly active war service, and who as William IV nominated him a K.H. on 4 February 1834, and knighted him on 5 March. Travers had no further employment afloat; he became a rear-admiral on the retired list on 9 July 1855, and died at Great Yarmouth on 4 March 1858. He married, in April 1815, Anne, eldest daughter of William Steward of Yarmouth, and left issue five sons and two daughters.
