= Arson attacks on the British Chargé d'affaires Office =

1967 diplomatic incident in China

The Arson attacks on the British Chargé d'affaires Office (simplified Chinese: 火烧英国代办处事件; traditional Chinese: 火燒英國代辦處事件; pinyin: Huǒshāo Yīngguó Dàibànchù Shìjiàn) was a major diplomatic incident that occurred in Beijing in August 1967, during the Cultural Revolution. It remains one of the most severe foreign-related incidents since the founding of the People's Republic of China.

== Background ==
In May 1967, the 1967 Hong Kong riots broke out in British Hong Kong. To support the leftists in Hong Kong, various sectors in Beijing organized anti-British rallies. Under the intensifying atmosphere of the Cultural Revolution, several attacks on diplomatic personnel had already occurred earlier that year.

In August, the Hong Kong government arrested the heads of three leftist newspapers for inciting violence and publishing fake news. On August 7, Wang Li, a member of the Cultural Revolution Group, gave a speech inciting rebels to seize power within the Ministry of Foreign Affairs that denounced the Chinese Foreign Minister Chen Yi and the ministry's "timidity" in their handling of foreign relations. On August 17, the court ordered a six-month suspension of these papers. In response, the Chinese Ministry of Foreign Affairs issued an ultimatum to the British government on August 20, demanding the lifting of the ban and the release of 19 journalists within 48 hours, or the British would face "all consequences."

== Incident ==
On August 22, the Red Guard organization "Anti-Imperialist and Anti-Revisionist Liaison Station" (反帝修联络站) organized tens of thousands of people to hold a "Mass Rally to Denounce British Imperialist Anti-China Crimes" (声讨英帝反华罪行大会) in front of the Office of the British Chargé d'Affaires. The rally began at 9:00 p.m.; the protesters were "initially disciplined," with the crowd sitting in an orderly fashion, delivering speeches, and shouting anti-British slogans through loudspeakers.

At the time, British diplomatic staff within the compound were sharing a meal of "tinned sausages and peas, claret and biscuits and cheese" while other staffers gathered to watch The Wrong Arm of the Law or played contract bridge.

As the 48-hour ultimatum expired, at approximately 10:45 p.m., a large number of rebel groups rushed into the British mission despite resistance from guards. They destroyed doors and windows, threw furniture out of the windows, and used gasoline cans and Molotov cocktails to set fire to the mission building and parked cars.

Sir Donald Hopson, the chargé d'affaires, and Counselor Percy Cradock initially led the staff and their families to shelter in the mission's strongroom. Other staffers also moved quickly into action by destroying files and documents, but soon had to abandon their tasks as the crowd breached the buildings. As soon as the building was set on fire, they were forced to escape through an emergency exit. When they reached the courtyard, Red Guards surrounded them, beat them with clubs, and tore at their clothing. They were "not only spat upon and kicked but also forced to bow before a portrait of Chairman Mao." Hopson firmly refused to kneel before the portrait and was beaten by the Red Guards until his face was covered in blood and his body was bruised. Several other diplomatic staff members were also injured in the incident. Additionally, Hopson's residence in Beijing was ransacked.

Hopson recounted the incident in an dispatch to Downing Street after the attacks:

At 10.30 p.m., I had just bid three no trumps, when I heard a roar from the crowd outside. I ran to the window, which looked over the main gateway, and saw that the masses had risen to their feet and were surging like an angry sea against the small cordon of soldiers who linked arms three deep before the gates. The mob greeted us with howls of exultation and immediately set about us with everything they had. We were hauled by our hair, half-strangled with our ties, kicked, and beaten on the head with long bamboo poles. The girls were not spared lewd attentions from the prying fingers of the mob. Most of those who were wearing wristwatches had them removed, and shirts, trousers and knickers were torn. So much for the morals of the Red Guards. The signed photograph of the Queen (Elizabeth II), which I had earlier placed in the security zone of the office, survived though slightly singed.

Fire engines subsequently arrived at the scene to attempt to extinguish the fire but were temporarily blocked by the Red Guards. In the early hours of the morning, Premier Zhou Enlai and Jiang Qing ordered the Red Guards to cease the attack. Later, People's Liberation Army (PLA) personnel arrived to escort the besieged British staff away, relocating them to the embassies of European countries such as Sweden, Norway, and France, though they were not permitted to leave Beijing.

== Reactions ==
In the early hours of August 23, Premier Zhou Enlai urgently summoned representatives from the rebel organizations within the foreign affairs sector and strongly condemned their illegal actions. On the same day, the People's Daily reported: "Last night, more than 10,000 Red Guards and revolutionary masses in the capital flocked to the Office of the British Chargé d'Affaires to hold a massive demonstration. They held a rally in front of the gate to denounce the anti-China crimes of British Imperialism and, driven by righteous indignation, took strong actions against the Office."

According to Mao's biographer Philip Short, Zhou suspected the attacks were the result of the influence exerted by Cultural Revolution Group propagandists Guan Feng and Qi Benyu along with Wang Li. Mao reportedly was not pleased by the numerous attacks on diplomatic missions as it had shown that China was "failing to meet its international obligations". Wang's speech at the Foreign Ministry was later denounced by Mao as a "big, big, big poisonous weed" and both Wang and Guan were accused of "wrecking the Cultural Revolution" and was personally ordered by Mao to be arrested immediately while Qi was spared for the time being before he too would be arrested as well following a separate incident.

Although Hopson and others were escorted by PLA personnel from the besieged and burning mission and taken to stay temporarily at other European embassies within the Beijing Legation Quarter, they were effectively placed under house arrest for several months because the Chinese government prohibited British diplomatic staff from leaving the country. On August 23, in response to the burning of the mission and the restrictions on its diplomats, the British government announced exit restrictions on 50 to 60 Chinese diplomatic personnel in the UK. George Thomson, the secretary of state for Commonwealth affairs, stated that the Chinese side had "outrageously trampled on the sovereignty of another nation." In the following days, physical clashes broke out between staff from the Chinese chargé d'affaires office in London (now the Chinese embassy in the UK) and the London police. Some Chinese diplomatic personnel brandished copies of Quotations from Chairman Mao Tse-tung, and several Chinese staff members were injured.

In December 1967, as the leftist riots in Hong Kong came to an end, relations between the two countries began to ease. On April 12, 1968, while still prohibited from leaving Beijing, Donald Hopson visited Anthony Grey, a British journalist who had been held under house arrest in his basement by the Chinese government on "espionage charges" since July 21, 1967. In August 1968, Hopson finally received an exit permit from the Chinese government and flew from Beijing to Hong Kong.

On March 2, 1971, Zhou Enlai met with the British chargé d'affaires John Denson and offered a formal apology to the British side for the attack on and burning of the mission. In the same year, the reconstruction of the British mission premises, funded by the Chinese Ministry of Foreign Affairs, was completed.

== Impact on the 1967 riots ==
After the expiration of the 48-hour ultimatum—in which the Chinese government demanded the Hong Kong government rescind the publication ban on three leftist newspapers and release 19 arrested leftist media executives and journalists—on the night of August 22, the Chinese authorities took no further retaliatory action beyond the Red Guards' attack and burning of the British mission in Beijing. Furthermore, following the incident, Chinese Premier Zhou Enlai immediately summoned representatives of the rebel organizations within the Ministry of Foreign Affairs, condemning the reckless acts of assaulting British diplomats and destroying the mission. He also reached out to the British government to communicate regarding the event. Through these developments, the British government realized that the Chinese government would not take more drastic actions to support the riots initiated by leftists in Hong Kong, nor would it deploy troops to Hong Kong for this cause. The arson attack by the Red Guards, instead of intimidating the British, "exposed China's hand." Consequently, the British government no longer had to worry that a hardline response to the leftist riots by the Hong Kong government would provoke a stronger reaction from China or even lead to war, which gave the Hong Kong government, then under Governor Sir David Trench, greater leeway to adopt firm measures to suppress the leftist riots.

This severe diplomatic incident also prompted the Central Committee of the CCP to re-examine its stance on the 1967 riots. As the struggles of the Cultural Revolution and the leftists continued to escalate, Zhou Enlai found the situation increasingly difficult to control and was placed in a passive diplomatic position. Ultimately, in December of the same year, he called a halt to the intense struggles being carried out by leftists in Hong Kong.

== Later careers of British personnel ==
Of the 23 British diplomats and staff present at the mission that night, several went on to hold high-ranking positions. These include Sir Percy Cradock (Ambassador to China in 1978), Sir Leonard Appleyard (Ambassador to China in 1994), Sir John Weston (permanent representative to the United Nations in 1995), and Sir Ray Whitney (member of Parliament in 1978). Most would go on to negotiate the eventual handover of Hong Kong back to China in 1997.

== See also ==
- List of attacks on diplomatic missions
- Anthony Grey
- China–United Kingdom relations
- Embassy of the United Kingdom, Beijing
- Foreign relations of China
