= Northwest A&F University =

University in Xianyang, Shaanxi, China

- 西北农林科技大学
- Motto: 诚朴勇毅
- Motto in English: Be honest, modest, brave and resolute
- Type: Public
- Established: 20 April 1934; 92 years ago
- Endowment: 358 million RMB (research only, Year 2012)
- President: Professor Bai Lianyang (柏连阳)
- Students: 28,964
- Location: Yangling District, Xianyang, Shaanxi, China
- Campus: Urban, 3,944,638 m^{2} (3.94 km^{2})
- Colors: Green
- Nickname: 西农
- Website: nwafu.edu.cn nwsuaf.edu.cn

Northwest A&F University
- Simplified Chinese: 西北农林科技大学
- Traditional Chinese: 西北農林科技大學
Transcriptions
Standard Mandarin
- Hanyu Pinyin: Xīběi Nónglín Kējì Dàxué

Northwest A&F University (NWAFU; Chinese: 西北农林科技大学; lit. 'Northwestern Agricultural and Forestry Science and Technology University') is a national public university located in Yangling District, Xianyang, Shaanxi, China. It is affiliated with the Ministry of Education of China. The university is part of Project 211, Project 985, and the Double First-Class Construction.

== History ==
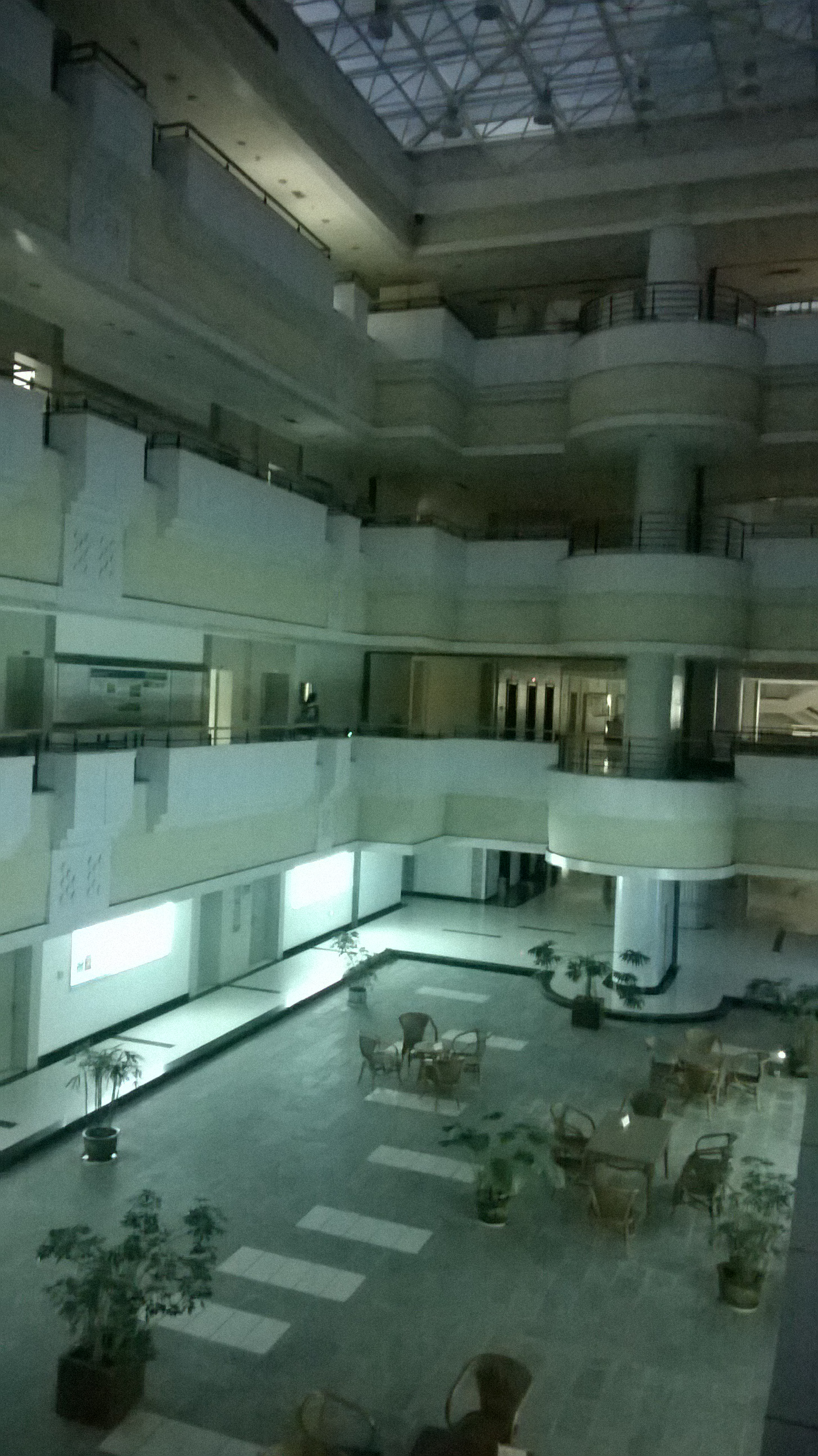
Inside the Research Building, South Campus, Northwest A&F University of Science and Technology

The State Council agreed to merge 7 organizations as new Northwest A&F University in a reply to the proposal drafted by Ministry of Education and Shaanxi Province Government. A financial budget of 600,000,000 RMB was granted as start fund and further investment plan as well as related issue such as reshuffle were also briefly stated in this official reply. On 11 September 1999, a central government delegation led by Vice Premier Li Lanqing attended the opening ceremony and made the announcement.

=== List of presidents ===
==== President ====
- September 1999 – August 2003 Mr. Chen, Zongxing (陈宗兴)
- August 2003 – January 2011 Professor. Sun, Wuxue (孙武学)
- January 2011 – July 2017 Professor Sun, Qixin (孙其信)
- December 2017 - 13 November 2026 Professor Wu, Pute (吴普特)
- 13 November 2026 - present Professor Bai, Lianyang (柏连阳)

==== Communist Party Committee Secretary of A&F ====
- September 1999 – August 2003 Professor Sun, Wuxue (孙武学)
- August 2003 – May 2013 Professor. Zhang, Guangqiang (张光强)
- May 2013 – August 2015 Dr. Liang, Gui (梁桂)
- August 2015 – present Mr. Li, Xingwang (李兴旺)

== Rankings and reputation ==
University rankings
BCUR National	Domestic	71
Wu Shulian National	Domestic	44
CUAA National	Alumni	64
QS National	General	49
QS Asia (Asia version)	General	=234
ARWU World	Research	201–300
QS World	General	801–850
USNWR World	General	=288

NWAFU is a member of "Project 985" club which is an organization of 39 reputable universities in China.

In 2017, Times Higher Education World University Rankings ranked the university within the 801-1000 band globally.

The overall global ranking of NWAFU by the U.S. News & World Report Best Global University Rankings 2025 is 288.

In 2025, Academic Ranking of World Universities (ARWU) ranked the university at 201-300 globally.

Regarding scientific research output, the 2025 Nature Index Research Leaders placed NWAFU 230th in the world among leading academic institutions.

=== Subject Rankings ===
The university ranks as Top 3 research and teaching quality in China's agriculture universities.

Northwest A&F University's research achievements are dominant in the fields of agriculture biology including wheat breeding, entomology, agriculture resource management, horticulture, plant protection, food science (especially in Enology), forestry and veterinary. Besides, the university is also reputable in agricultural water conservancy, agriculture economics and management, agriculture mechanics and information engineering and ancient agricultural history research.

In 2025, the "Agricultural Science" subject was ranked 3rd globally by the U.S. News & World Report Best Global University Rankings and the Academic Ranking of World Universities (ARWU). Meanwhile, "Plant and Animal Science" was ranked 8th globally by the Academic Ranking of World Universities (ARWU).

Subject Rankings in the World Top 50	U.S. News & World Report 2025	ARWU 2024
Water Resources	1	5
Agricultural Sciences	3	3
Food Science & Technology	9	8
Veterinary Sciences	12	8
Biotechnology and Applied Microbiology	13	27

== See also ==
- China-UK Sustainable Agriculture Innovation Network
