= Bai Lianyang =

Chinese engineer

- 柏连阳
- Born: December 1967 (age 58); Qiyang County, Hunan, China
- Education: Hunan Agricultural University
- Scientific career
- Fields: Pesticide processing and application
- Workplaces: Northwest A&F University

Chinese name
- Simplified Chinese: 柏连阳
- Traditional Chinese: 柏連陽
Transcriptions
Standard Mandarin
- Hanyu Pinyin: Bǎi Liányáng

Bai Lianyang (born December 1967) is a Chinese engineer who is the president of Northwest A&F University, former party secretary and vice president of Hunan Academy of Agricultural Sciences, former president and party secretary of Hunan University of Humanities, Science and Technology, and an academician of the Chinese Academy of Engineering.

== Biography ==
Bai was born in Qiyang County, Hunan, in December 1967. In 1984, he was accepted to Hunan Agricultural University. After graduation in 1988, he was dispatched to Hunan Institute of Plant Protection. In October 1994, he joined the faculty of Plant Protection Department of his alma mater, and moved up the ranks to become vice president in December 2003. He became president of Hunan University of Humanities, Science and Technology, in April 2009, and then party secretary, the top political position in the university, beginning in August of that same year. In July 2013, he was transferred back to Changsha, capital of Hunan, and appointed Chinese Communist Party Committee Secretary and vice president of Hunan Academy of Agricultural Sciences. In November 2026, he was appointed president of Northwest A&F University

== Honours and awards ==
- 18 November 2021 Member of the Chinese Academy of Engineering (CAE)
