= Embassy of the United Kingdom, Beijing =

British Embassy, Beijing 英国驻华大使馆
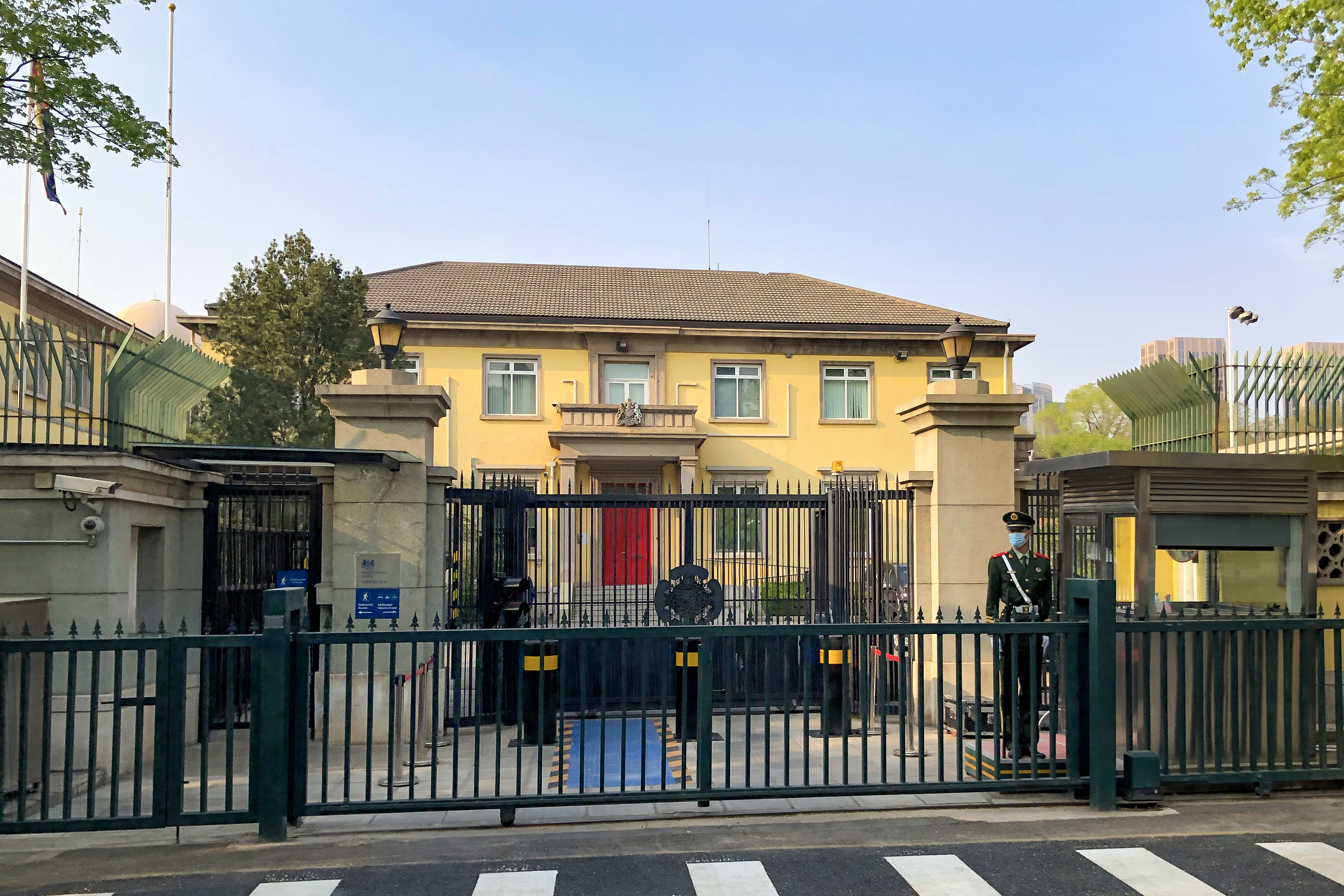
- The Embassy building in Beijing
- Location: Beijing, China
- Address: 11 Guang Hua Lu, Jian Guo Men Wai, 100600 Beijing, China
- Coordinates: 39.9124°N 116.4423°E
- Ambassador: Peter Wilson
- Website: British Embassy Beijing

The British Embassy, Beijing (Chinese: 英国驻华大使馆; pinyin: Yīngguó Zhù Huá Dàshǐ Guǎn) is the chief diplomatic mission of the United Kingdom in the People's Republic of China. It is one of Britain's largest overseas embassies. It is located at 11 Guanghua Road, in the Chaoyang District. The current British Ambassador to China is Peter Wilson.

== History ==
The old British legation was established on 26 March 1861, at the former palace of Duke I-liang and Sir Frederick Bruce became the first “Envoy Extraordinary and Minister Plenipotentiary” to Imperial China to reside in Beijing. Considering the place substandard, work began to find a replacement, and the legation was moved to "Leang-Koong-foo" (the Duke of Leang's palace) in 1866, where it would stay until 1959.

In 1959, the Chinese authorities required the British to vacate their location as they wanted to redevelop the land for use as the Supreme People's Court. In January 1959, the British were informed that "the centre of Peking was scheduled for reconstruction and the area occupied by the British Legation was required for the site of a large new building for the Judicial Executive. The staff of the Legation was, therefore, requested to move out of their quarters by 31 May 1959”. In exchange for vacating their old premises in 1959, the Chinese authorities built and offered the British their current embassy and residence in the diplomatic district. The embassy consists of two two-storey houses set in walled gardens. Another reason was that the building was symbolic of the unequal treaties and the century of humiliation for many Chinese, so shifting to a new one would help shed that historical baggage.

During the Cultural Revolution and at the tail-end of the 1967 Hong Kong riots, the Red Guards stormed the premises, looted the British Office of the Chargé d'Affaires (predecessor body of embassy) and burnt it on 23 August.

== Other locations ==
With time, the consular section required more space than the embassy building (referred to locally as the 'main building') could provide, so it was relocated to the Kerry Centre, less than kilometer away. Visa applications are currently handled by another centre, at Chaoyangmen, which is shared with Ireland.

Outside Beijing, there are also British consulates general in Guangzhou, Wuhan, Chongqing and Shanghai where the senior officer is known as the consul-general. There is also a British consulate-general in Hong Kong (the largest British consulate-general in the world), responsible for maintaining British ties with Hong Kong and Macao. However, due to Hong Kong's unique status, the consul-general reports directly to the China Department of the Foreign and Commonwealth Office, instead of going through the British ambassador in Beijing.

== See also ==
- China-United Kingdom relations
- Embassy of China, London
- List of Ambassadors of the United Kingdom to China
