= Lady Hughes Affair =

1784 diplomatic incident between Britain and China

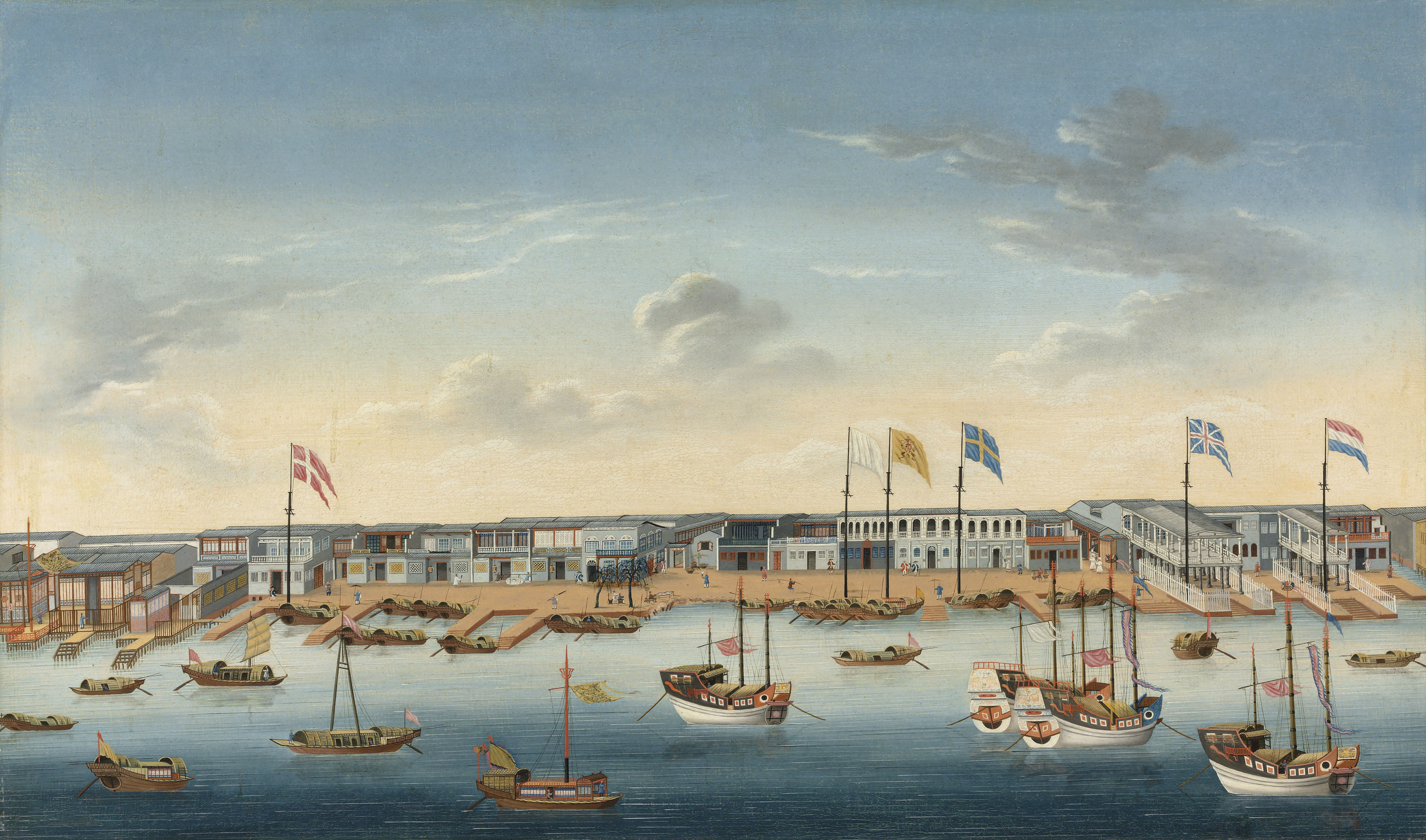
The Thirteen Factories, where the incident took place, in 1780

The Lady Hughes affair (Chinese: 休斯夫人號禮炮傷人案) was an international incident in 1784 between Great Britain and the Qing dynasty. On 24 November 1784, the British merchantman Lady Hughes fired a gun salute for a nearby Dano-Norwegian ship in the Thirteen Factories neighbourhood of Canton. The salute injured three Chinese men in a nearby boat, two of whom died of their injuries. In response, local Qing officials detained Lady Hughes and refused to release the ship until her crew handed over the sailor who had fired the salute. Once he was in their custody, Qing authorities executed the sailor by strangulation on 2 December.

The British criticized the decision, saying that justice was too harsh and the gunner lacked due legal process. These criticisms ultimately helped contribute to the ultimate imposition of extraterritoriality regimes in China. Although the crew of Lady Hughes claimed that the deaths of the two Chinese men were accidental, this has been questioned by subsequent scholarship. Under English law, for a homicide to be considered accidental it needed to occur as part of a lawful act, and Europeans in China were aware that firing salutes were illegal.
