= Sustainable Agriculture Innovation Network =

Chinese-British sustainable agriculture network launched in 2008

The China-UK Sustainable Agriculture Innovation Network (SAIN) is a Sustainable agriculture Network launched in 2008 to provide a framework for collaboration on agriculture and climate change between the UK and China.

The agreement supports the already existing China-UK Sustainable Development Dialogue (SDD) signed by the Chinese Ministry of Agriculture and the UK Department of Environment, Food and Rural Affairs (DEFRA). Agreed upon by the Chinese Ministry of Agriculture (MOA) and the Department of Environment, Food and Rural Affairs (DEFRA), the development of SAIN was included in the SDD work program on Sustainable Agriculture and Fisheries. After being originally proposed at the UK-China Partners in Science Conference in North West China, a business plan was created after consultation with Chinese stake-holders, bilateral agencies, and international organizations. in December 2008, the Ministry of Agriculture (MOA) and Department of Environment, food and Rural Affairs accepted and adopted the new policy.

The UK-China Sustainable Agriculture Innovation Network has four primary goals: 1. Support UK-China SDD by policy approaches, institutional mechanisms, and moving policy and science to the ground level. 2. Encourage and grow research on environmentally sustainable agriculture and its relevance to local, national, and the global economy. 3. Gather important actors, such as farmers and policy makers, and educate them on environmentally sustainable agriculture issues. 4. Increase global sustainability with south-south learning.

The organization of SAIN consists of a Governing Board, two Secretariat Offices, and Working Groups. The North West Agriculture Forestry University in China and East Anglia University in England are the locations of the two Secretariat Offices.

== Universities ==
- North West Agriculture and Forestry University
- University of East Anglia
