= List of Major Historical and Cultural Sites Protected at the National Level (First Batch) =

The First Batch of Major Historical and Cultural Sites Protected at the National Level in China was announced by the State Council of the People's Republic of China on March 4, 1961 containing 180 sites. One site was removed on October 26, 1964 and restored on October 16, 1981 (the Palace of the Zhong King of the Taiping Heavenly Kingdom).

== Revolutionary Sites and Memorials (33 Sites) ==
	Code	Location Name	Image	Year	Address
1	1-0001-5-001	Site of the Sanyuanli Incident		1841	Sanyuanli, Guangzhou, Guangdong Province
2	1-0002-5-002	Site of the Jintian Uprising		1851	Jintian Village, Guiping County, Guangxi Zhuang Autonomous Region
3	1-0003-5-003	Palace of the Zhong King of the Taiping Heavenly Kingdom		1860-1863	Suzhou City, Jiangsu Province
4	1-0004-5-004	Former Residence of Mao Zedong		1893	Shaoshan City, Hunan Province
5	1-0005-5-005	Gyantse Dzong Anti-British Site		1904	Gyantse County, Tibet Autonomous Region
6	1-0006-5-006	Tomb of the Seventy-Two Martyrs of the Huanghuagang Uprising		1911	Guangzhou, Guangdong
7	1-0007-5-007	Site of the Military Government of the Wuchang Uprising		1911	Wuhan, Hubei
8	1-0008-5-008	Original Building of Peking University			Dongcheng District, Beijing
9	1-0009-5-009	Former Residence of Sun Yat-Sen (Shanghai)		1919	Xiangshan Road, Shanghai
10	1-0010-5-010	Former Central Headquarters of the Communist Youth League of China		1920-1921	Yuyangli, Huaihai Road, Shanghai
11	1-0011-5-011	Site of the First National Congress of the Chinese Communist Party		1921	Xingye Road, Shanghai
12	1-0012-5-012	Former Site of the Peasant Movement Training Institute		1926	Zhongshan 4th Road, Guangzhou City, Guangdong Province
13	1-0013-5-013	Site of the August 1 Nanchang Uprising		1927	Nanchang City, Jiangxi Province
14	1-0014-5-014	Site of Joining Forces in Wenjiashi of Autumn Harvest Uprising		1927	Liuyang County, Hunan Province
15	1-0015-5-015	Former Red Palace and Red Square in Haifeng County		1927-1928	Zhongshan West Road , Haifeng County, Guangdong Province
16	1-0016-5-016	Former Site of the Guangzhou Commune		1927	Weixin Road, Guangzhou City, Guangdong Province
17	1-0017-5-017	Jinggangshan Revolutionary Site		1927-1929	Ninggang County, Jiangxi Province
18	1-0018-5-018	Site of the Gutian Congress		1929	Gutian Village, Shanghang County, Fujian Province
19	1-0019-5-019	Sun Yat-Sen Mausoleum		1929	Purple Mountain, Nanjing City, Jiangsu Province
20	1-0020-5-020	Revolutionary Sites in Ruijin		1931-1934	Ruijin County, Jiangxi Province
21	1-0021-5-021	Site of the Zunyi Conference		1935	Zunyi City, Guizhou Province
22	1-0022-5-022	Luding Bridge		1935	Luding County, Garze Tibetan Autonomous Prefecture, Sichuan Province
23	1-0023-5-023	Revolutionary Sites in Yan'an		1937-1947	Yan'an County, Shaanxi Province
24	1-0024-5-024	Marco Polo Bridge		1937	Fengtai district, Beijing
25	1-0025-5-025	Site of the Battle of Pingxingguan		1937	Fanzhi County, Shanxi Province
26	1-0026-5-026	Site of the Headquarters of the Eighth Route Army		1938	Wuxiang County, Shanxi Province
27	1-0027-5-027	Former Site of the New Fourth Army		1938-1941	Jing County, Anhui Province
28	1-0028-5-028	Former site of the Chongqing Office of the Eighth Route Army (Hongyancun)		1938-1946	Hongyan Village and Zengjiayan, Chongqing City
29	1-0029-5-029	Ranzhuang Tunnels Battle Site		1942	Baoding City, Hebei Province
30	1-0030-5-030	Tiananmen Gate			Beijing
31	1-0031-5-031	Tomb of Lu Xun			Shanghai Hongkou Park
32	1-0032-5-032	Memorial Pillar to Sino-Soviet Friendship		1957	Dalian City, Liaoning Province
33	1-0033-5-033	Monument to the People's Heroes		1958	Beijing Tiananmen Square

== Caves Temples (14 Sites) ==
	Code	Location Name	Image	Era	Address
34	1-0034-4-001	Yungang Grottoes		Northern Wei	Datong City, Shanxi Province
35	1-0034-4-002	Mogao Grottoes (Including the Western Thousand Buddha Caves)		Northern Wei to Yuan	Dunhuang County, Gansu Province
36	1-0036-4-003	Yulin Grottoes		Northern Wei to Yuan	Anxi County, Gansu Province
37	1-0037-4-004	Longmen Grottoes (Including Tomb of Bai Juyi)		Northern Wei to Tang	Luoyang City, Henan Province
38	1-0038-4-005	Maijishan Grottoes		Northern Wei to Ming	Tianshui City, Gansu Province
39	1-0039-4-006	Bingling Temple Grottoes		Northern Wei to Ming	Linxia City, Linxia Hui Autonomous Prefecture, Gansu Province
40	1-0040-4-007	Xiangtangshan Grottoes		Eastern Wei, Northern Qi to Yuan	Handan City, Hebei Province
41	1-0041-4-008	Kizil Thousand Buddha Caves		Tang to Song	Baicheng County, Xinjiang Uygur Autonomous Region
42	1-0042-4-009	Kumtura Thousand Buddha Caves		Tang to Song	Kuqa County, Xinjiang Uygur Autonomous Region
43	1-0043-4-010	Cliff Statue of Huangze Temple		Tang	Guangyuan County, Sichuan Province
44	1-0044-4-011	Guangyuan Thousand Buddha Cliff Statue		Tang, Song	Guangyuan County, Sichuan Province
45	1-0045-4-012	Beishan Cliff Statues (Part of the Dazu Rock Carvings)		Tang, Song	Dazu District, Chongqing
46	1-0046-4-013	Baodingshan Cliff Statues (Part of the Dazu Rock Carvings)		Song	Dazu District, Chongqing
47	1-0047-4-014	Shizhongshan Grottoes		Nanzhao Kingdom, Dali Kingdom (649-1094)	Jianchuan County, Dali Bai Autonomous Prefecture, Yunnan Province

== Ancient Buildings and Historical Monuments (77 Sites) ==
	Code	Location Name	Image	Era	Address
48	1-0048-3-001	Tai Shi Gate Tower		Eastern Han	Dengfeng County, Henan Province
49	1-0049-3-002	Shao Shi Gate Tower		Eastern Han	Dengfeng County, Henan Province
50	1-0050-3-003	Hou Mu Gate Tower		Eastern Han	Dengfeng County, Henan Province
51	1-0051-3-004	Feng Huan Gate Tower		Eastern Han	Qu County, Sichuan Province
52	1-0052-3-005	Pingyang Mansion Gate Tower		Eastern Han	Mianyang County, Sichuan Province
53	1-0053-3-006	Shen Mansion Gate Tower		Eastern Han	Qu County, Sichuan Province
54	1-0054-3-007	Xiaotang Mountain Guo Family Shrine		Eastern Han	Feicheng County, Shandong Province
55	1-0055-3-008	Jiaxiang Wu Family Shrines		Eastern Han	Jining City, Shandong Province
56	1-0056-3-009	Gao Yi's Tomb and Stone Carvings		Eastern Han	Ya'an County, Sichuan Province
57	1-0057-3-010	Baoxiedao Stone Gate and Cliff Carvings		Han to Song	Hanzhong City, Shaanxi Province
58	1-0058-3-011	Anji Bridge		Sui	Zhao County, Hebei Province
59	1-0059-3-012	Anping Bridge		Southern Song	Jinjiang County, Fujian Province
60	1-0060-3-013	Yongtong Bridge		Jin	Zhao County, Hebei Province
61	1-0061-3-014	Songyue Pagoda		Northern Wei	Dengfeng County, Henan Province
62	1-0062-3-015	Four Gates Pagoda		Eastern Wei	Licheng County, Shandong Province
63	1-0063-3-016	Giant Wild Goose Pagoda		Tang	Xi'an, Shaanxi Province
64	1-0064-3-017	Small Wild Goose Pagoda		Tang	Xi'an, Shaanxi Province
65	1-0065-3-018	Chongsheng Temple Three Pagodas of Dali		Tang, Five Dynasties	Dali City, Dali Bai Autonomous Prefecture, Yunnan Province
66	1-0066-3-019	Yunju Temple Pagoda and Stone Sutras		Sui, Tang, Liao, Jurchen Jin	Fangshan County, Beijing
67	1-0067-3-020	Xinjiao Temple Pagoda		Tang	Chang'an County, Shaanxi Province
68	1-0068-3-021	Suzhou Tiger Hill Pagoda		Five Dynasties	Suzhou City, Jiangsu Province
69	1-0069-3-022	Youguo Temple Iron Pagoda		Northern Song	Kaifeng City, Henan Province
70	1-0070-3-023	Kaiyuan Temple Liaodi Pagoda		Northern Song	Ding County, Hebei Province
71	1-0071-3-024	Pagoda of Fogong Temple		Liao	Ying County, Shanxi Province
72	1-0072-3-025	Liuhe Pagoda		Southern Song	Hangzhou, Zhejiang
73	1-0073-3-026	Guanghui Temple Hua Pagoda		Jurchen Jin	Zhengding County, Hebei Province
74	1-0074-3-027	Miaoying Temple White Pagoda		Yuan	Xicheng District, Beijing
75	1-0075-3-028	Diamond Throne of Zhenjue Temple		Ming	Haidian district, Beijing
76	1-0076-3-029	Haibao Tower		Qing	Yinchuan, Ningxia Hui Autonomous Region
77	1-0077-3-030	Stone Pillar of Righteous Mercy		Northern Qi	Yi County, Hebei Province
78	1-0078-3-031	Dharani Sutra Column in Zhaozhou		Northern Song	Ningjin County, Hebei Province
79	1-0079-3-032	Nanchan Temple Main Hall		Tang	Wutai County, Shanxi Province
80	1-0080-3-033	Foguang Temple		Tang to Qing	Wutai County, Shanxi Province
81	1-0081-3-034	Jokhang Temple			Lhasa, Tibet Autonomous Region
82	1-0082-3-035	Tradruk Temple			Nedong District, Tibet Autonomous Region
83	1-0083-3-036	Guangxiao Temple		Five Dynasties to Ming	Guangzhou, Guangdong
84	1-0084-3-037	Dule Temple		Liao	Ji County, Hebei Province
85	1-0085-3-038	Jinci		Song	Taiyuan, Shanxi Province
86	1-0086-3-039	Fengguo Temple		Liao	Yixian County, Liaoning Province
87	1-0087-3-040	Qingjing Mosque		Song	Quanzhou City, Fujian Province
88	1-0088-3-041	Shanhua Temple		Liao, Jurchen Jin	Datong City, Shanxi Province
89	1-0089-3-042	Longxing Temple		Song	Zhengding County, Hebei Province
90	1-0090-3-043	Baoguo Temple		Northern Song	Ningbo City, Zhejiang Province
91	1-0091-3-044	Huayan Temple		Liao, Jurchen Jin,Qing	Datong City, Shanxi Province
92	1-0092-3-045	White Horse Temple		Jurchen Jin to Qing	Luoyang City, Henan Province
93	1-0093-3-046	Yongle Gong		Yuan	Ruicheng County, Shanxi Province
94	1-0094-3-047	Golden Hall at Wudangshan		Yuan, Ming	Guanghua County, Hubei Province
95	1-0095-3-048	Sakya Monastery		Yuan	Sakya County, Tibet Autonomous Region
96	1-0096-3-049	Guangsheng Temple		Yuan, Ming	Hongdong County, Shanxi Province
97	1-0097-3-050	Gaocheng Astronomical Observatory		Yuan	Dengfeng County, Henan Province
98	1-0098-3-051	Cloud Platform at Juyong Pass		Yuan	Changping County, Beijing
99	1-0099-3-052	Qufu Confucius Temple and Confucius Family Mansion		Jurchen Jin to Qing	Qufu County, Shandong Province
100	1-0100-3-053	Forbidden City		Ming, Qing	Beijing
101	1-0101-3-054	Great Wall at Badaling		Ming	Yanqing County, Beijing
102	1-0102-3-055	End of Great Wall at Shanhaiguan		Ming	Qinhuangdao City, Hebei Province
103	1-0103-3-056	End of Great Wall at Jiayuguan		Ming	Jiuquan City, Gansu Province
104	1-0104-3-057	Xi'an City Walls		Ming	Xi'an, Shaanxi Province
105	1-0105-3-058	Temple of Heaven		Ming	Chongwen District, Beijing
106	1-0106-3-059	Beihai Lake		Ming, Qing	Xicheng District, Beijing
107	1-0107-3-060	Potala Palace		Ming to Republican	Lhasa, Tibet Autonomous Region
108	1-0108-3-061	Ganden Monastery		Ming, Qing	Lhasa, Tibet Autonomous Region
109	1-0109-3-062	Tashi Lhunpo Monastery		Ming, Qing	Shigatse County, Tibet Autonomous Region
110	1-0110-3-063	Zhihua Temple		Ming	Dongcheng District, Beijing
111	1-0111-3-064	Kumbum Monastery		Ming	Huangzhong County, Qinghai Province
112	1-0112-3-065	Mukden Palace		Qing	Shenyang, Liaoning
113	1-0113-3-066	Guozijian		Qing	Dongcheng District, Beijing
114	1-0114-3-067	Lama Temple		Qing	Dongcheng District, Beijing
115	1-0115-3-068	Puning Temple, Hebei		Qing	Chengde City, Hebei Province
116	1-0116-3-069	Pule Temple, Hebei		Qing	Chengde City, Hebei Province
117	1-0117-3-070	Putuo Zongcheng Temple		Qing	Chengde City, Hebei Province
118	1-0118-3-071	Xumi Fushou Temple		Qing	Chengde City, Hebei Province
119	1-0119-3-072	Wuhou Temple		Qing	Chengdu, Sichuan Province
120	1-0120-3-073	Du Fu Thatched Cottage		Qing	Chengdu, Sichuan Province
121	1-0121-3-074	Humble Administrator's Garden		Ming, Qing	Suzhou City, Jiangsu Province
122	1-0122-3-075	Summer Palace		Qing	Haidian district, Beijing
123	1-0123-3-076	Chengde Mountain Resort		Qing	Chengde City, Hebei Province
124	1-0124-3-077	Lingering Garden		Qing	Suzhou City, Jiangsu Province

== Stone Carvings (11 Sites) ==
	Code	Location Name	Image	Address
125	1-0125-4-001	Xi'an Stele Forest	Han to Contemporary	Xi'an, Shaanxi Province
126	1-0126-4-002	Cuanbaozi Stele	Eastern Jin	Qujing County, Yunnan Province
127	1-0127-4-003	Cuanlongyan Stele	Southern Dynasties	Luliang County, Yunnan Province
128	1-0128-4-004	Yaowang Mountain Stone Carving	Sui to Ming	Tongchuan City, Shaanxi Province
129	1-0129-4-005	Monument to the Alliance of the Duan Clan and the 37 Tribes	Dali Kingdom (937-1094)	Qujing County, Yunnan Province
130	1-0130-4-006	Stele to the Rebuilding of the Ganying Pagoda at the Huguo Temple (i.e. the Western Xia Stele, Liangzhou Stele)	Western Xia (1032-1227)	Wuwei County, Gansu Province
131	1-0131-4-007	Song Carvings at the Suzhou Confucius Temple	Southern Song	Suzhou City, Jiangsu Province
132	1-0132-4-008	Xizhou Copper Column	Five Dynasties	Yongshun County, Xiangxi Tujia and Miao Autonomous Prefecture, Hunan Province
133	1-0133-4-009	Copper and Iron Buddha at Wannian Temple in Mount Emei	Song to Ming	Emei County, Sichuan Province
134	1-0134-4-010	Iron Lion of Cangzhou	Later Zhou	Cang County, Hebei Province
135	1-0135-4-011	Statue of Arhat in Baosheng Temple	Northern Song	Suzhou City, Jiangsu Province

== Archeological Sites (26 Sites) ==
	Code	Location Name	Image	Era	Address
136	1-0136-1-001	Zhoukoudian Archeological Site		Paleolithic	Fangshan County, Beijing
137	1-0137-1-002	Dincun Archeological Site		Paleolithic	Linfen County, Shanxi Province
138	1-0138-1-003	Yangshao Culture Archeological Site		Neolithic	Mianchi County, Henan Province
139	1-0139-1-004	Banpo Archeological Site		Neolithic	Xi'an, Shaanxi Province
140	1-0140-1-005	Chenziya Archeological Site		Neolithic	Zhangqiu County, Shandong Province
141	1-0141-1-006	Zhengzhou Shang City, Former Capital of Shang Dynasty		Shang	Zhengzhou City, Henan Province
142	1-0142-1-007	Yinxu, site of last Capital of Shang Dynasty		Shang	Anyang City, Henan Province
143	1-0143-1-008	Fenghao, Former Capital of Zhou Dynasty		Zhou	Chang'an City, Shaanxi Province
144	1-0144-1-009	Linzi, Former Capital of Qi State		Zhou	Yidu County, Shandong Province
145	1-0145-1-010	Qufu, Former Capital of Lu State		Zhou to Han	Qufu County, Shandong Province
146	1-0146-1-011	Former Capital of Jin State		Eastern Zhou	Houma, Shanxi Province
147	1-0147-1-012	Former Capital of Chu State		Eastern Zhou	Jiangling County, Hubei Province
148	1-0148-1-013	Former Capital of Han State		Eastern Zhou	Xinzheng County, Henan Province
149	1-0149-1-014	Former Capital of Zhao State		Warring States	Handan City, Hebei Province
150	1-0150-1-015	Xiadu, Former Capital of Yan State		Warring States	Yi County, Hebei Province
151	1-0151-1-016	Site of Epang Palace		Qin	Xi'an, Shaanxi Province
152	1-0152-1-017	Former site of Han Chang'an City		Western Han	Xi'an, Shaanxi Province
153	1-0153-1-018	Ancient city of Luoyang		Western Han to Northern Wei	Luoyang City, Henan Province
154	1-0154-1-019	Gaochang		Gaochang (500-640)	Turpan County, Xinjiang Uygur Autonomous Region
155	1-0155-1-020	Yarkhoto (Jiaohe Ruins)		Gaochang (500-640)	Turpan County, Xinjiang Uygur Autonomous Region
156	1-0156-1-021	Site of Daming Palace		Tang	Xi'an, Shaanxi Province
157	1-0157-1-022	Site of Taihe, Capital of the Nanzhao Kingdom		Nanzhao Kingdom (649-902)	Dali City, Dali Bai Autonomous Prefecture, Yunnan Province
158	1-0158-1-023	Sanggyeong Yongcheonbu, Capital of Balhae		Balhae Kingdom (698-926)	Ning'an County, Heilongjiang Province
159	1-0159-1-024	Shangjing, Upper Capital of Liao Dynasty		Liao	Balin Zuo Banner, Inner Mongolia Autonomous Region
160	1-0160-1-025	Zhongjing, Middle Capital of Liao Dynasty		Liao	Ningcheng County, Inner Mongolia Autonomous Region
161	1-0161-1-026	Tsaparang, Capital of Guge Kingdom		Around the 10th Century CE	Zada County, Tibet Autonomous Region

== Ancient Burial Sites (19 Sites) ==
	Code	Location Name	Image	Era	Address
162	1-0162-2-001	Mausoleum of the Yellow Emperor			Huangling County, Shaanxi Province
163	1-0163-2-002	Cemetery of Confucius		Eastern Zhou	Qufu County, Shandong Province
164	1-0164-2-003	Mausoleum of the First Qin Emperor		Qin	Lintong County, Shaanxi Province
165	1-0165-2-004	Maoling Mausoleum		Western Han	Xingping County, Shaanxi Province
166	1-0166-2-005	Tomb of Huo Qubing		Western Han	Xingping County, Shaanxi Province
167	1-0167-2-006	Liaoyang Mural Tombs		Han to Jin	Liaoyang City, Liaoning Province
168	1-0168-2-007	Tombs at Donggou (Including the Gwanggaeto Stele)		Goguryeo (37 BCE - 668 CE)	Ji'an County, Jilin Province
169	1-0169-2-008	Feng's Tomb		Northern Wei to Sui	Wuqiao County, Hebei Province
170	1-0170-2-009	Zhaoling Mausoleum		Tang	Liquan County, Shaanxi Province
171	1-0171-2-010	Qianling Mausoleum		Tang	Qian County, Shaanxi Province
172	1-0172-2-011	Shunling Mausoleum		Tang	Xianyang City, Shaanxi Province
173	1-0173-2-012	Liudingshan Tombs of Balhae Kingdom		Balhae Kingdom (698-926)	Dunhua County, Yanbian Korean Autonomous Prefecture, Jilin Province
174	1-0174-2-013	Valley of the Kings (Tibet)		7th Century CE	Qiongjie County, Tibet Autonomous Region
175	1-0175-2-014	Tomb of Wang Jian		Former Shu (Five Dynasties Period)	Chengdu, Sichuan Province
176	1-0176-2-015	Tomb of Yue Fei		Southern Song	Hangzhou, Zhejiang
177	1-0177-2-016	Ming Xiaoling Mausoleum		Ming	Nanjing, Jiangsu Province
178	1-0178-2-017	Thirteen Ming Tombs		Ming	Changping County, Beijing
179	1-0179-2-018	Eastern Qing Tombs		Qing	Zunhua County, Hebei Province
180	1-0180-2-019	Western Qing Tombs		Qing	Yi County, Hebei Province

== See also ==
- Major Historical and Cultural Site Protected at the National Level
- List of Major Historical and Cultural Sites Protected at the National Level (Second Batch)
- List of Major Nationally Protected Historical and Cultural Sites Of China (Third Batch)
- List of Major Nationally Protected Historical and Cultural Sites Of China (Fourth Batch)
- List of Major Nationally Protected Historical and Cultural Sites Of China (Fifth Batch)
- List of Major Nationally Protected Historical and Cultural Sites Of China (Sixth Batch)
- List of Major Nationally Protected Historical and Cultural Sites Of China (Seventh Batch)
- List of Major Nationally Protected Historical and Cultural Sites Of China (Eighth Batch)
