= List of Major Historical and Cultural Sites Protected at the National Level (Second Batch) =

List of protected Chinese historical and cultural sites

The second batch of Major Historical and Cultural Sites Protected at the National Level was announced by the State Council of the People's Republic of China on February 23, 1982, with a total of 62 sites.

== Revolutionary Sites and Memorials (10 Sites) ==
	Code	Location Name	Image	Year	Address
1	2-0001-5-001	Lin Zexu Opium Destruction Pool and Weiyuan Fort		1839	Dongguan, Guangzhou
2	2-0002-5-002	Former Residence of the Heavenly King of Taiping Heavenly Kingdom		1853–1864	Nanjing, Jiangsu
3	2-0003-5-003	Memorial Hall of the Boxer Uprising		1900	Tianjin
4	2-0004-5-004	Anyuan Miners' Strike Memorial Hall		1922	Anyuan, Jiangxi
5	2-0005-5-005	Site of the August 7 Conference		1927	Wuhan, Hubei
6	2-0006-5-006	Site of Xi'an Incident		1936	Xi'an, Shaanxi
7	2-0007-5-007	Site of Bethune Model Hospital		1938	Wutai County, Shanxi
8	2-0008-5-008	Former Site of the Central Committee of the Chinese Communist Party in Xibaipo		1948	Pingshan County, Hebei, Hebei
9	2-0009-5-009	Former residence of Soong Ching-ling		1963	Beijing
10	2-0010-5-010	Tomb of Soong Ching Ling		1981	Shanghai

== Caves Temples (5 Sites） ==
	Code	Location Name	Image	Era	Address
11	2-0011-4-001	Gongxian Grottoes		Northern Wei to Song	Gong County, Henan
12	2-0012-4-002	Xumishan Grottoes		Northern Wei to Tang	Guyuan, Ningxia
13	2-0013-4-003	Leshan Giant Buddha		Tang	Leshan, Sichuan
14	2-0014-4-004	Bezeklik Caves		Tang to Yuan	Turpan, Xinjiang
15	2-0015-4-005	Feilaifeng Grottoes		Five Dynasties to Yuan	Hangzhou, Zhejiang

== Ancient Buildings and Historical Monuments (28 Sites) ==
	Code	Location Name	Image	Era	Address
16	2-0016-3-001	Xiuding Temple Pagoda		Tang	Anyang, Henan
17	2-0017-3-002	Yuquan Temple and Steel Pagoda		Song	Dangyang, Hubei
18	2-0018-3-003	Wanbu Huayanjing Pagoda		Liao	Hohhot, Inner Mongolia
19	2-0019-3-004	Hualin Temple (Fuzhou)		Song	Fuzhou, Fujian
20	2-0020-3-005	Kaiyuan Temple (Quanzhou)		Song to Qing	Quanzhou, Fujian
21	2-0021-3-006	Lingyan Temple (Jinan)		Tang to Qing	Changqing County, Shandong
22	2-0022-3-007	Xuanmiao Temple		Song	Suzhou, Jiangsu
23	2-0023-3-008	Yanshan Temple		Jin	Fanzhi County, Shanxi
24	2-0024-3-009	Beiyue Temple		Yuan	Quyang, Hebei
25	2-0025-3-010	Zixiao Palace		Ming	Jun County, Hubei
26	2-0026-3-011	Xiantong Temple		Ming to Qing	Wutai County, Shanxi
27	2-0027-3-012	Drepung Monastery		Ming	Lhasa, Tibet
28	2-0028-3-013	Sera Monastery		Ming	Lhasa, Tibet
29	2-0029-3-014	Huangshicheng		Ming	Beijing
30	2-0030-3-015	Hanging Temple		Ming	Hunyuan County, Shanxi
31	2-0031-3-016	Tianyi Ge		Ming to Qing	Ningbo, Zhejiang
32	2-0032-3-017	Beijing Ancient Observatory		Ming to Qing	Beijing
33	2-0033-3-018	Zhenwu Pavilion		Ming	Rong County, Guangxi
34	2-0034-3-019	Qutan Temple		Ming	Ledu County, Qinghai
35	2-0035-3-020	Southeast Corner Tower		Ming	Beijing
36	2-0036-3-021	Dujiangyan		Qin to Qing	Guan County, Sichuan
37	2-0037-3-022	Penglai Ancient City and Penglai Pavilion		Ming	Penglai County, Shandong
38	2-0038-3-023	Golden Hall of Taihe Palace		Qin	Kunming, Yunnan
39	2-0039-3-024	Yu Garden		Qin to Qing	Shanghai
40	2-0040-3-025	Prince Gong's Mansion		Qin	Beijing
41	2-0041-3-026	Master of the Nets Garden		Qin	Suzhou, Jiangsu
42	2-0042-3-027	Chengyang Bridge		1912	Sanjiang County, Guangxi
43	2-0043-3-028	Labrang Monastery		Qin	Xiahe County, Gansu

== Stone Carvings and Others (2 Sites) ==
	Code	Location Name	Image	Era	Address
44	2-0044-4-001	Changde Iron Dhvaja		Song	Changde, Hunan
45	2-0045-4-002	Sutra Pillar of the Ksitigarbha Temple		Dali Kingdom	Kunming, Yunnan

== Archeological Sites (10 Sites) ==
	Code	Location Name	Image	Year	Address
46	2-0046-1-001	Yuanmou Man Archeological Site		Paleolithic	Yuanmou, Yunnan
47	2-0047-1-002	Lantian Man Archeological Site		Paleolithic	Lantian, Yunnan
48	2-0048-1-003	Dawenkou Site		Neolithic	Tai'an, Shandong
49	2-0049-1-004	Hemudu Site		Neolithic	Yuyao, Zhejiang
50	2-0050-1-005	Zhouyuan Site		Western Zhou	Fufeng and Qishan, Shaanxi
51	2-0051-1-006	Tonglüshan ancient copper mine		Zhou to Han	Daye, Hubei
52	2-0052-1-007	Hwando		Goguryeo	Ji'an, Jilin
53	2-0053-1-008	Hutian Ceramic Kiln Sites		Five Dynasties to Ming	Jingdezhen, Jiangxi
54	2-0054-1-009	Jinshangjing Huiningfu Relics		Jin	Harbin, Heilongjiang
55	2-0055-1-010	Zhongdu of Ming Dynasty Imperial City and Stone Sculptures of Royal Tombs		Ming	Fengyang, Anhui

== Ancient Burial Sites (7 Sites) ==
	Code	Location Name	Image	Era	Address
56	2-0056-2-001	The Tomb and the Ancestral Temple of Sima Qian		Western Han to Song	Hancheng, Shaanxi
57	2-0057-2-002	Tomb of Yangcan		Song	Zunyi, Guizhou
58	2-0058-2-003	Song Tombs		Northern Song	Gong County, Henan
59	2-0059-2-004	Tomb of Lishizhen		Ming	Qichun County, Hubei
60	2-0060-2-005	Tomb of Zheng Chenggong		Qing	Nan'an County, Fujian
61	2-0061-2-006	Zhao Mausoleum		Qing	Shenyang, Liaoning
62	2-0062-2-007	Mausoleum of Genghis Khan			Ejin Horo Banner, Inner Mongolia

== See also ==
- Major Historical and Cultural Site Protected at the National Level
- Major Nationally Protected Historical and Cultural Site Of China (First Batch)
