= Yang Fang =

Yang Fang may refer to:

- Yang Fang (general) (1770–1846), Han Chinese general and diplomat during the Qing dynasty
- Yang Fang (figure skater) (born 1984), Chinese ice dancer
