= Yuquan Temple (Dangyang) =

Buddhist temple in Dangyang, China

- 玉泉寺
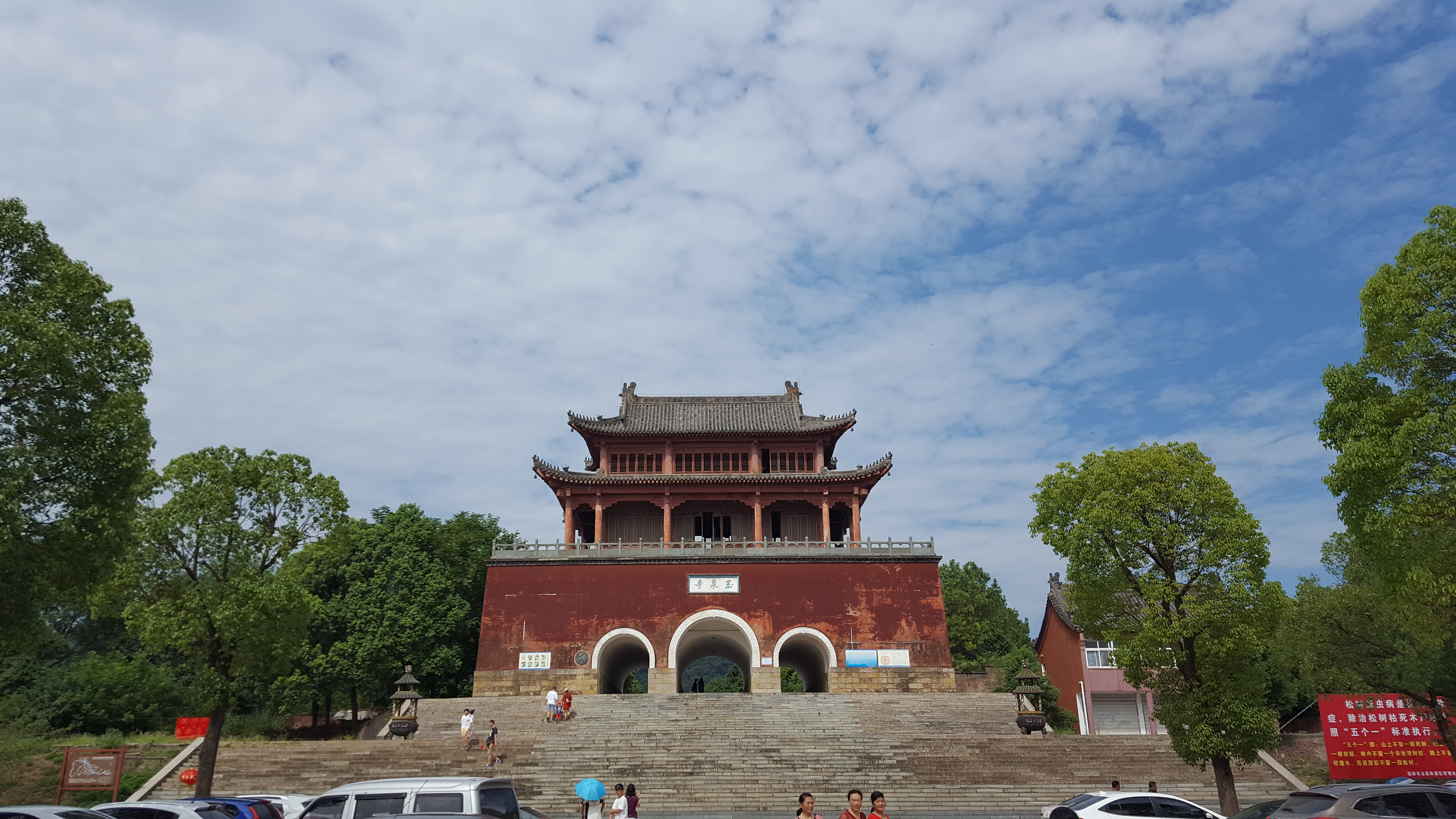
- Shanmen

- Location within Hubei Location within China

Religion
- Affiliation: Buddhism
- Sect: Tiantai

Location
- Location: Dangyang, Hubei, China
- Coordinates: 30°47′06″N 111°41′02″E

Architecture
- Style: Chinese architecture Cast-iron architecture
- Founder: Emperor Wu of Liang
- Established: 593

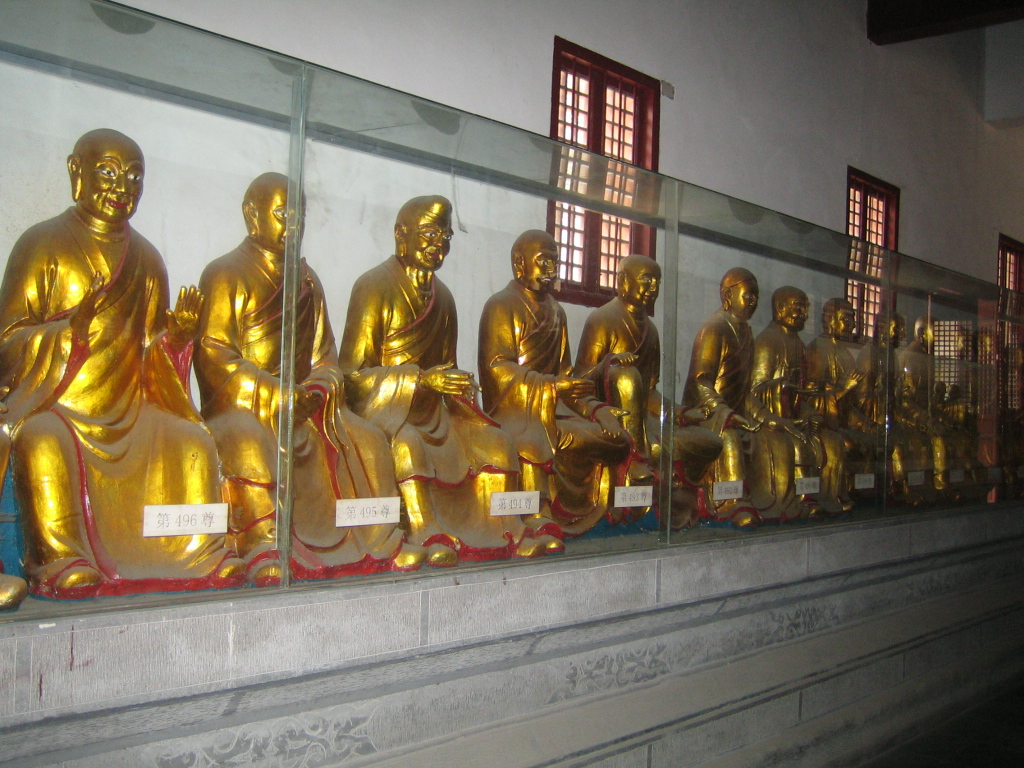

Yuquan Temple (Chinese: 玉泉寺; pinyin: Yùquán Sì) is a Buddhist temple in Dangyang, Hubei, China, first built in 593 during the Sui dynasty. Zhiyi sponsored the construction, and the name Yuquan was given by prince Yang Guang (the future emperor).

It is now one of China's Major Historical and Cultural Site Protected at the National Level and National Key Buddhist Temples in Han Chinese Area. However, lack of maintenance over the millennium, termite infestation and various vandalism especially during the Cultural Revolution (1966–76) all contributed to the dilapidation of the temple before 2003. In 2003, after receiving a large donation from Hong Kong businessman Yeung Chun Fan and others, and with the approval of State Administration of Cultural Heritage, the temple went through a rebuilding that finished in 2008.
