= Sanyuanli incident =

1841 Chinese military conflict

Coordinates: 23.1592°N 113.2608°E

Sanyuanli incident (三元里抗英事件)
- Part of the Battle of Canton
- Military situation map of the Sanyuanli Incident
Date	29–30 May 1841
Location	Sanyuanli, Baiyun District, Guangdong Province, China
Result	Inconclusive

Belligerents
United Kingdom; East India Company	China

Commanders and leaders
Hugh Gough; Humphrey Fleming Senhouse	Unknown

Strength
6,000	20,000–30,000 militia and local villagers

Casualties and losses
Unknown	Unknown

The Sanyuanli incident (Chinese: 三元里抗英事件; pinyin: sán yuán lǐ) was a military conflict between British troops and an irregular force made up of Chinese militia and local citizens that took place around Sanyuanli village on the outskirts of Canton (now Guangzhou) on the 29 May 1841 after the Second Battle of Canton at the time of the First Opium War (1839–1842). Though it was a minor skirmish, in the centuries that followed the incident took on legendary proportions among the Chinese public. The Chinese government has erected several monuments to commemorate the legacy of the incident.

== Background ==
On 25 May 1841, British forces under Major-general Hugh Gough left their transports at Qìnhăi (沁海) some 5 miles (8.0 kilometres) north west of Canton and prepared to attack the city. By the evening of the next day they had captured four Chinese forts and stood ready to attack the city walls. Instead, word arrived that Chinese authorities had agreed to British demands for compensation and the withdrawal of troops such that the planned assault was put on hold on the morning of the 27th.

== Incident ==
Postponement of the attack left nearly 5,000 British and Indian troops milling around in the sultry heat and moist atmosphere of the paddy fields north of Canton. According to historian Frederic Wakeman, there was no question that looting took place in villages such as Sanyuanli, but on the whole, by British military standards of the time, the troops behaved well. According to Chinese sources, a British patrol entered the home of local villager Wei Shaoguang (韋紹光) and proceeded to rape his wife, which triggered the incident. Thereafter the incensed local populace, swelled by arrivals from nearby villages, grew into a crowd of 10,000 who besieged the British on all sides. Armed with machetes, pikes and a variety of swords they enticed a detachment of 60 Indian soldiers into the marshy paddy fields where the latter's flintlock muskets, sodden by the heavy rain, failed to fire as the villagers attacked. Four Indian soldiers were killed while roughly 20 were wounded.

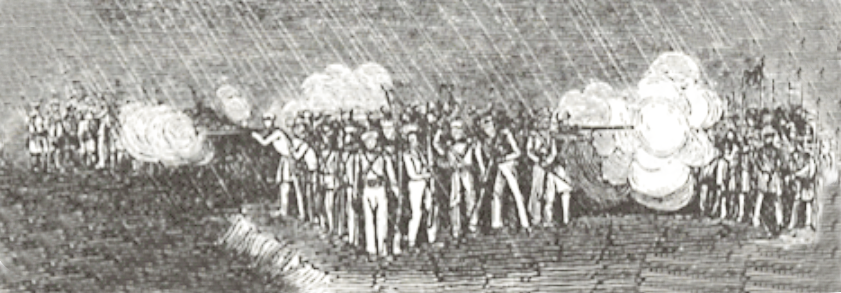
John Ouchterlonny's sketch of British soldiers in the rain at Sanyuanli

The British dispatched two detachments of Royal Marines, armed with waterproof percussion muskets, to reinforce the Indians. After a two-hour standoff, British forces withdrew to the Western Fort, only to be followed by the villagers who once more surrounded them. Once he understood the situation, Gough sent a message to Guangzhou governor Yu Baochun (余葆纯), informing him that if the siege continued, his army would raze Canton to the ground. Yu, well aware that this was no empty threat given the size of Gough's force, urged the crowd to disperse, which led to him being branded a traitor to the people.

== Legacy ==
With his reputation in tatters, the only post Yu Baochun could obtain was as a minor official in the department responsible for Imperial Examinations, where patriotic students would throw ink in his face.

At the epicentre of the conflict, a small hillock known as Niulangang (牛栏岗) at the side of the modern road north to Baiyun International Airport, the Guangzhou Provincial Government on 23 May 1991 set up a simple concrete memorial to commemorate the 150th anniversary of the clash.

As historian Frederic Wakeman writes:

"Out of the humiliating military defeats of the Opium War they have been able to extract a great popular victory, blemished only by the cowardice of Qing officials. Today, on the mainland, every child's history book contains an account of the battle. Every tablet, every shrine to the Sanyuanli dead, has been carefully tabulated by the local history bureau of the province: a Bunker Hill and an Alamo rolled into one."

== Notes ==
1. Pinyin: Qìnhăi (沁海), marked on some campaign maps of the time as "Tsing-poo", (沁浦). The location no longer exists
