= Xiuding Temple Pagoda =

Pagoda in Anyang City, China

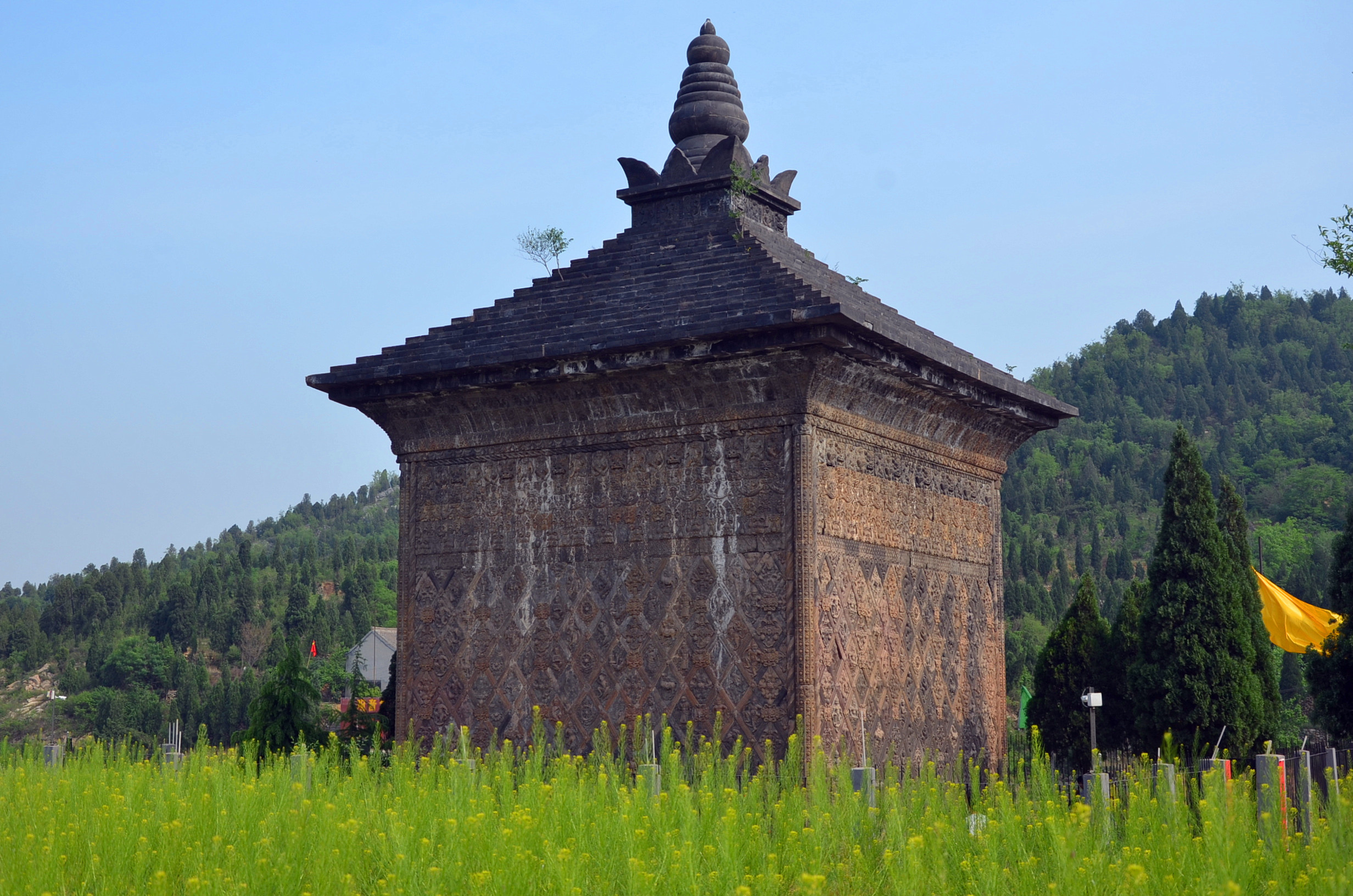

Religion
- Affiliation: Chan Buddhism
- Province: Henan Province

Location
- Country: China
- Interactive map of Xiuding Temple Pagoda
- Coordinates: 36°11′45″N 113°59′54″E

Architecture
- Completed: Tang Dynasty

Xiuding Temple Pagoda (修定寺塔) is located on the west side of Qingliangshan Village, Leikou Town, Anyang County, Anyang City, Henan Province, China. In 1982, it was listed in the second group of major cultural heritage sites under national-level protection.

Xiuding Temple was built in the 18th year of Taihe(太和) Emperor regin in the Northern Wei Dynasty(北魏) (494). It was originally named TianchengTemple(天成寺) . It was renamed Heshui Temple(合水寺) in the Northern Qi Dynasty(北齐). It was destroyed under the Emperor Wu regin of the Northern Zhou Dynasty(北周). It was rebuilt in the Sui Dynasty(隋朝) and renamed Xiuding Monastery(修定禅寺). The pagoda existing today was built in the Tang Dynasty(唐朝). The pagoda of Xiuding Temple is one-story high, square, and 20 meters high. The four walls of the pagoda are made of carved bricks, with a total of 3,775 carved bricks, which is an oddity in the Chinese pagoda history.

== Pagoda ==
The Xiuding Temple is built against a hill facing south. Before being abandoned at the end of Qing Dynasty, the temple had three courtyards. The only structure standing today is the pagoda. Its original location should be between the Hall of Four Heavenly Kings and the Mahavira Hall (The central worship building). The pagoda before repair works done in 1984 was 9.4m high and a width of 8.3m. The pagoda is hollow inside, with three sided wall up, only the south side have a arch opening. The pagoda base was built in the Northern Qi Dynasty(北齐). The base was built in an octagon shape. The pagoda was built in a rectangular shape. From the pagoda structure and archaeology findings, it is predicted that this Tang Dynasty pagoda was built on top of an older structure base.

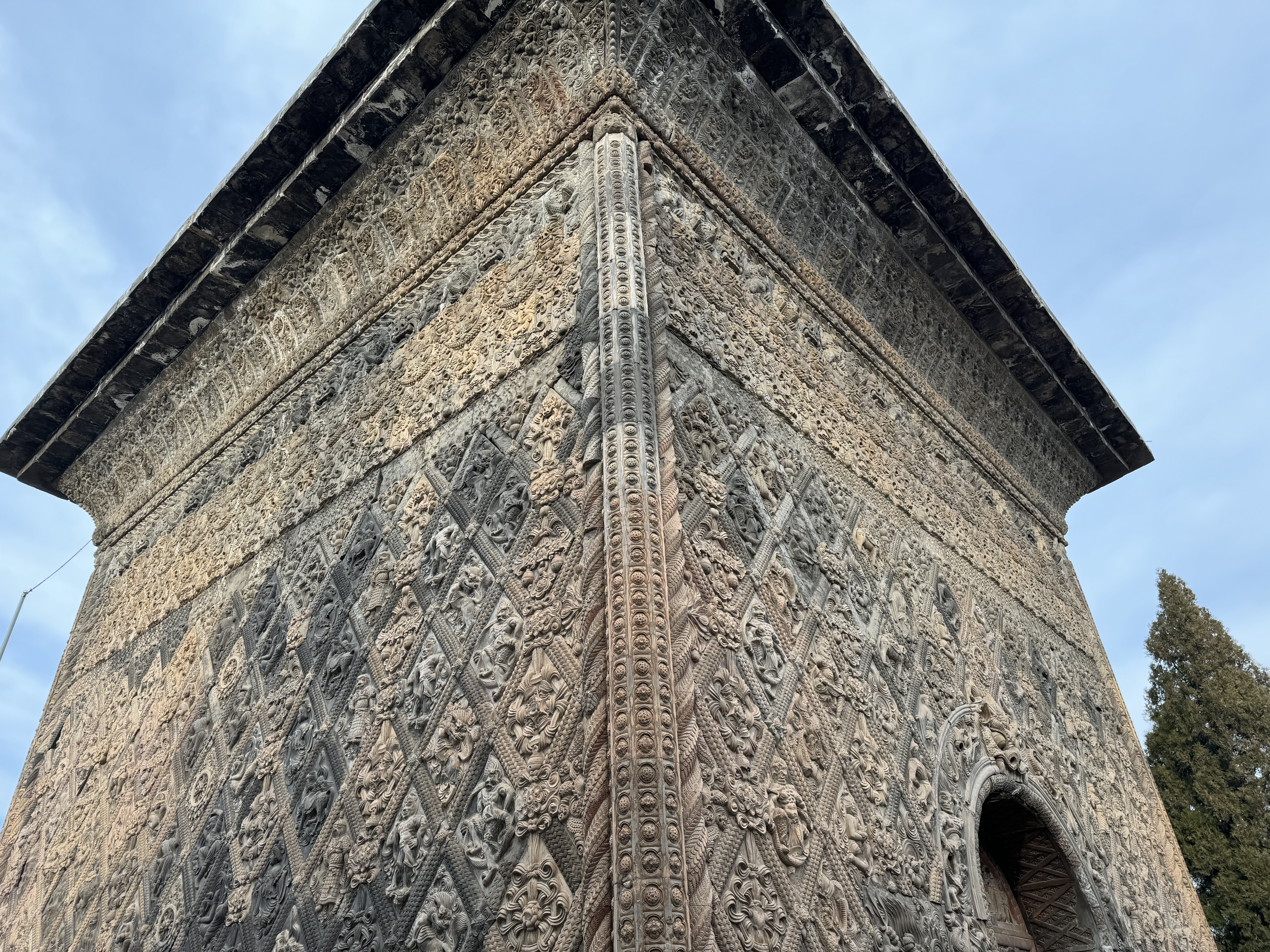
Side of the Pagoda

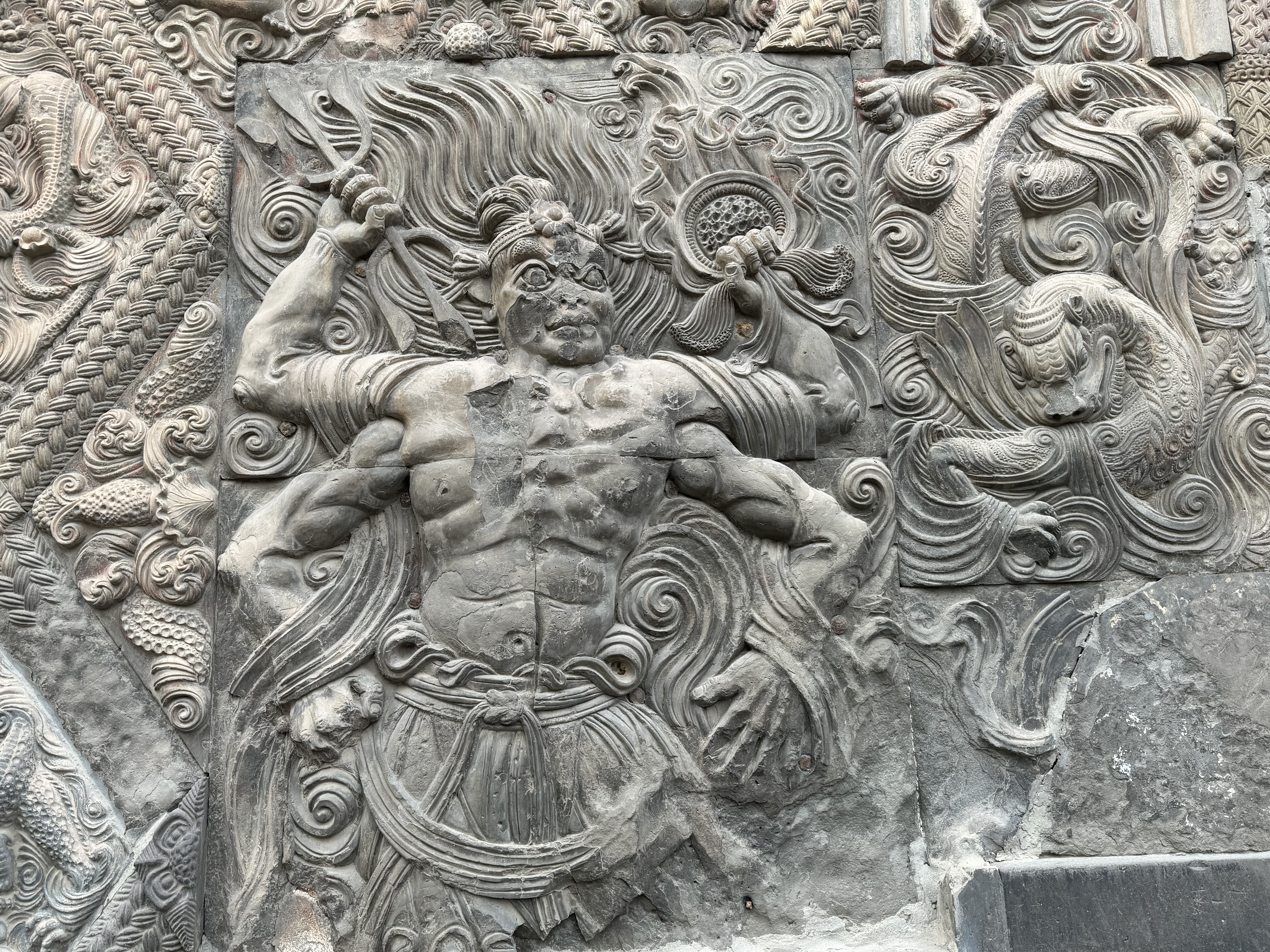
Four Arms Guardian on the left

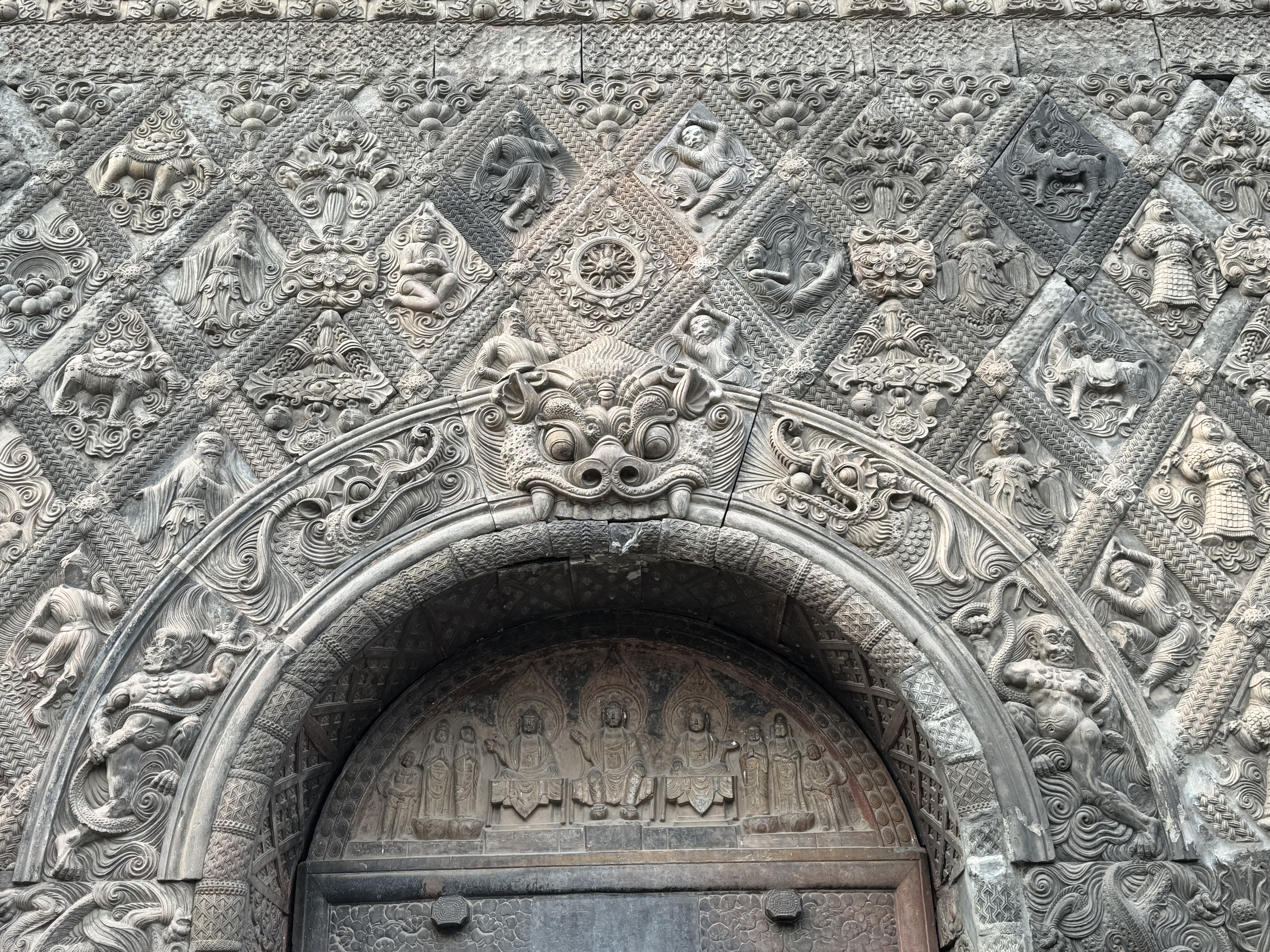
The Arch Gateway

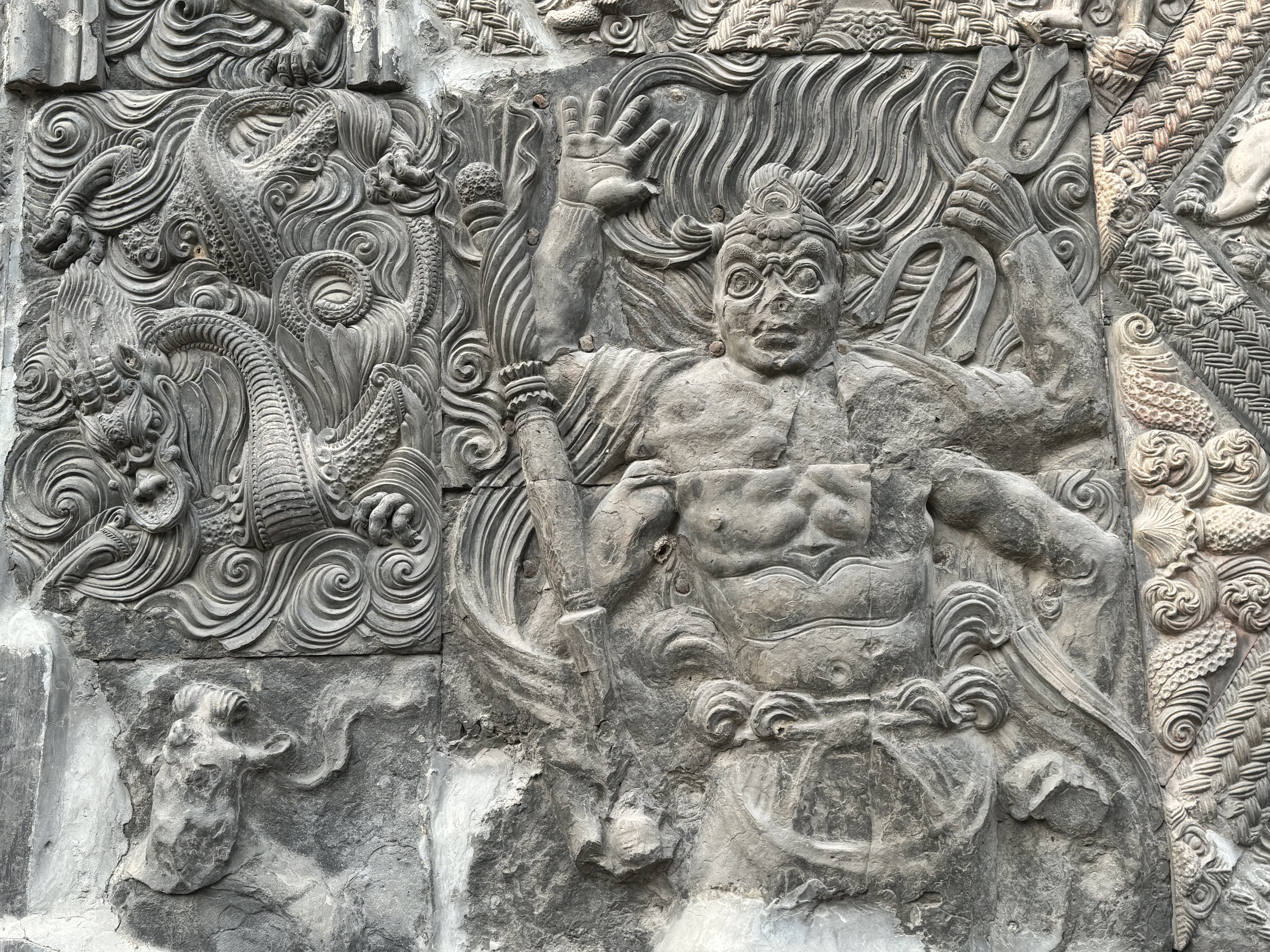
Four Arms Guardian on the right

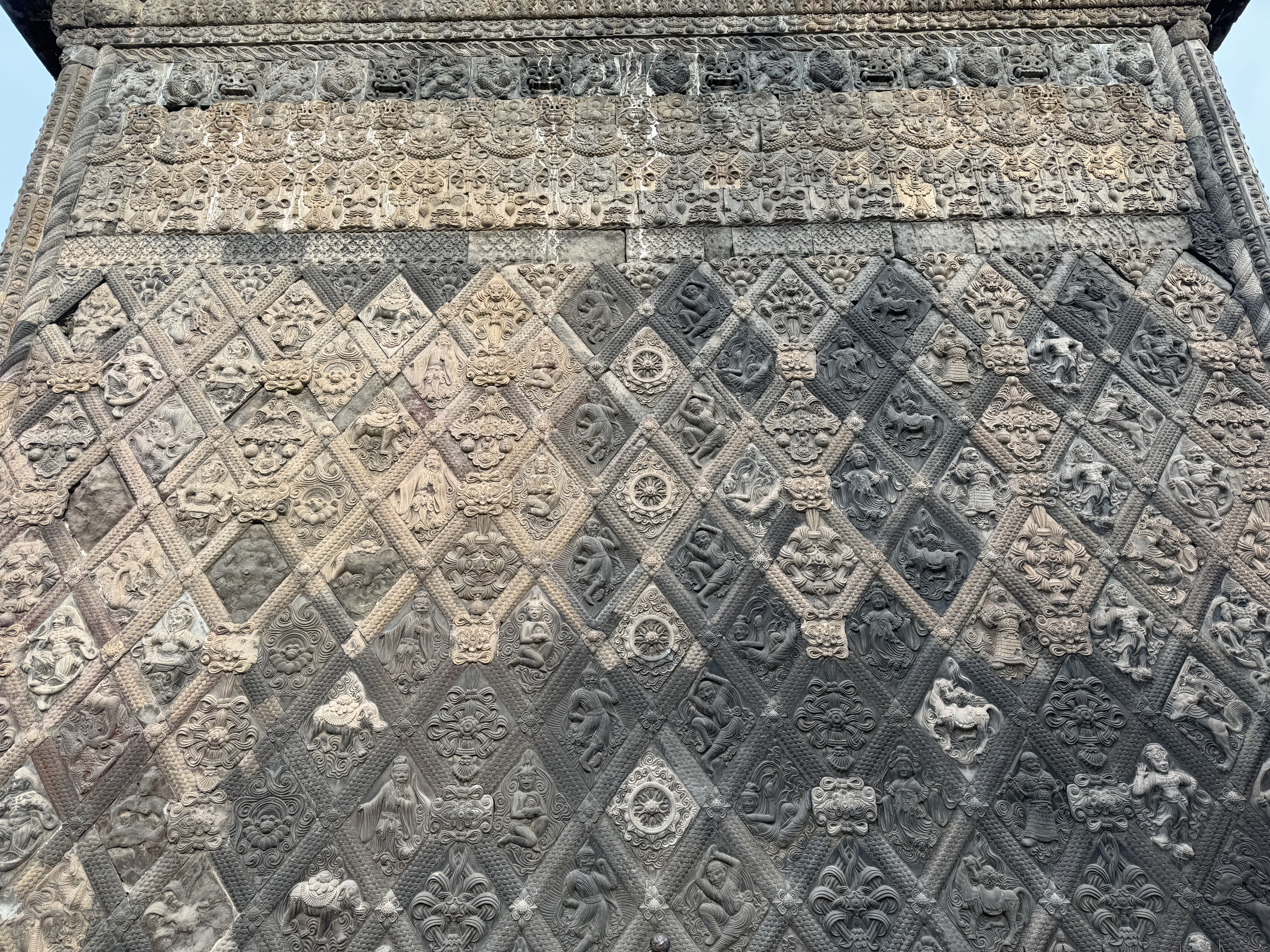
Carved Brick Wall
