= Thousand-Buddha Cliff (Guangyuan) =

Guangyuan Thousand-Buddha Cliff
- 廣元千佛崖摩崖造像 (Chinese)
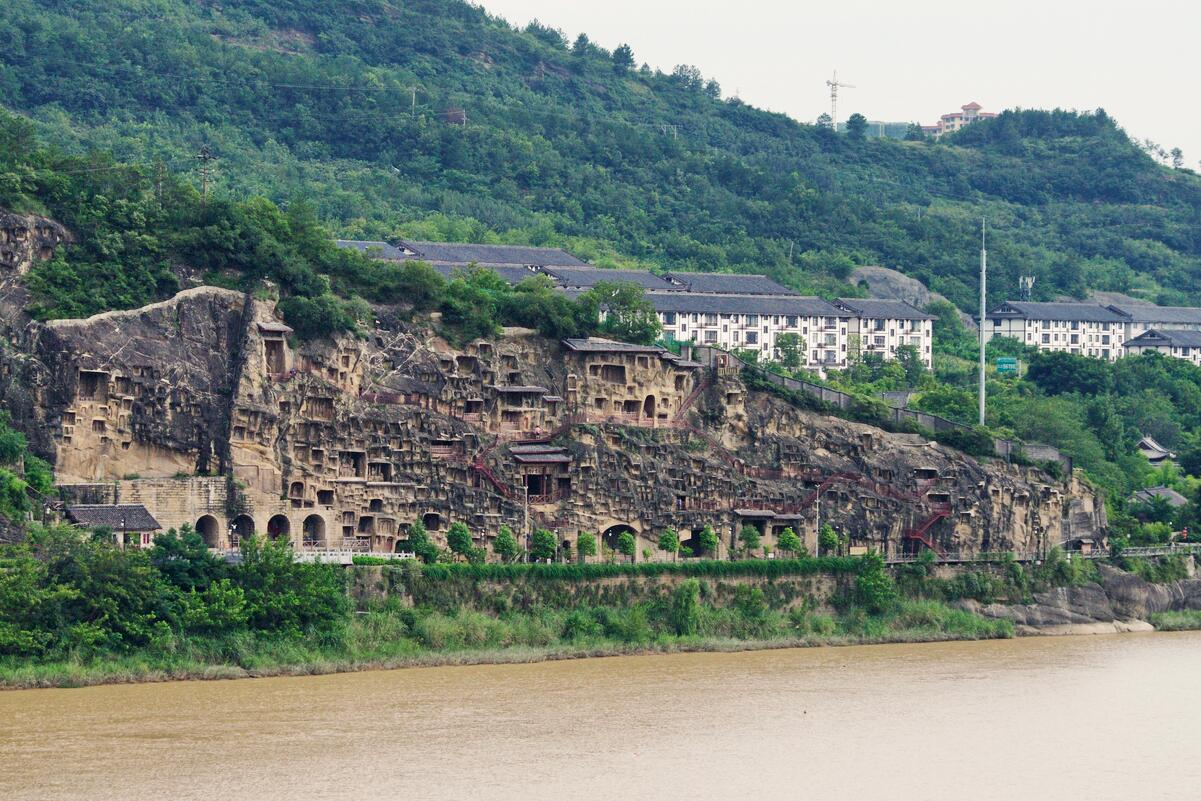
- Interactive map of Guangyuan Thousand-Buddha Cliff
- 32°28′17″N 105°50′38″E
- Type: Major Historical and Cultural Site of China
- Location: Guangyuan, China

Guangyuan Thousand-Buddha Cliff is located 4 km north of the Guangyuan city, on the eastern bank of the Jialing River.

The carving of Buddha statues on the cliff began during the late Northern Wei period and continued through subsequent dynasties, with the majority of the carvings made during the Tang dynasty. No new carvings were added after the Qing dynasty. The carvings are distributed along the eastern bank of the Jialing River, spanning 417 meters from north to south, reaching a height of more than 40 meters. As of today, 848 niches remain, containing over 7,000 statues.

== History ==
During the Northern and Southern dynasties, Buddhism reached its height in China and spread to Sichuan. After the Jianmen Shudao plank road was built, Guangyuan became a transportation hub and one of the key gateways for Buddhist art in Sichuan. Construction began in the Northern Wei period, by the plank road on the cliff. Carving caves and creating statues near strategically important transportation routes is a common method used by Buddhism for propagation.

Shortly after the founding of the Tang dynasty in 618, Emperor Gaozu strengthened his control over Sichuan, which facilitated increased communication between Ba Shu and Zhongyuan. This led to an increase in carving activities. The 7th century and the first half of the 8th century marked the peak of carving activities in Guangyuan. The close relationship between Empress Wu Zetian and Guangyuan further inspired local residents to build Buddhist statues. Many local officials, as well as those passing through the region, contributed to the carving of these effigies. This period represents the zenith of Tang dynasty Buddhist sculpture at the Thousand-Buddha Cliff.

In 1854, there were more than 17,000 statues on the cliff, along with large amounts of inscriptions carved alongside the statues.

From 1935 to 1936, the building of Sichuan - Shaanxi road severely damaged the lower part of the cliff, destroying more than half of the caves. Only around 7,000 statues remain after that. In December 1939, four researchers from Society for the Study of Chinese Architecture examined the damage. Liang Sicheng, one of the researchers, wrote a letter to the then Minister of Communications Chang Kia-ngau, urging him to protect the relic. This prevented further damage to the cliff.

On August 16, 1956, it was listed as the first batch of Sichuan Provincial Historical and Revolutionary Relic Sites. On March 4, 1961, the Thousand-Buddha Cliff in Guangyuan were announced by the State Council as one of the first batch of national key cultural relics. On July 7, 1980, it was listed as the first batch of Sichuan Cultural Protection Sites.
