= Huangze Temple =

Buddhist temple near Guangyuan, China

Coordinates: 32.4414°N 105.8108°E

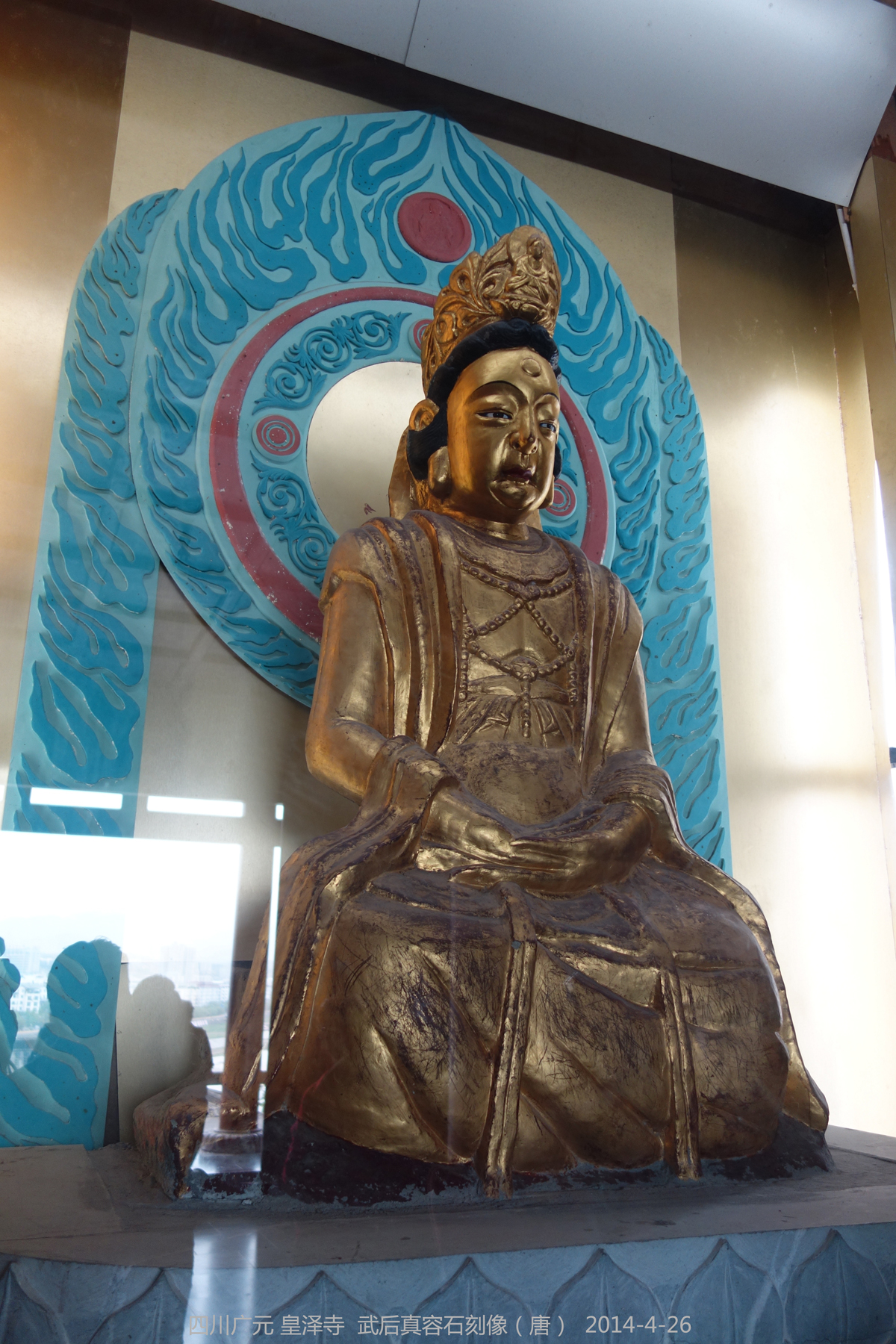
Buddhist statue of Wu Zetian from the 8th century housed in the temple. The statue is based on Wu Zetian's likeness in her later years.

Huangze Temple is a Buddhist temple west of Guangyuan, along the banks of the Jialing River and at the foot of Wulong Mountain. It is the only temple that is dedicated to Wu Zetian. Huangze Temple also has 6 caves, 41 niches, 1203 sculptures all on a cliff, which were created from the Northern Wei period to the Ming and Qing.

The temple was designated as a Major National Historical and Cultural Site in 1961 and an AAAA-level tourist attraction.
