= Battle of Canton (May 1841) =

May 1841 battle during the First Opium War

Coordinates: 23.1104°N 113.2438°E

Second Battle of Canton
- Part of the First Opium War
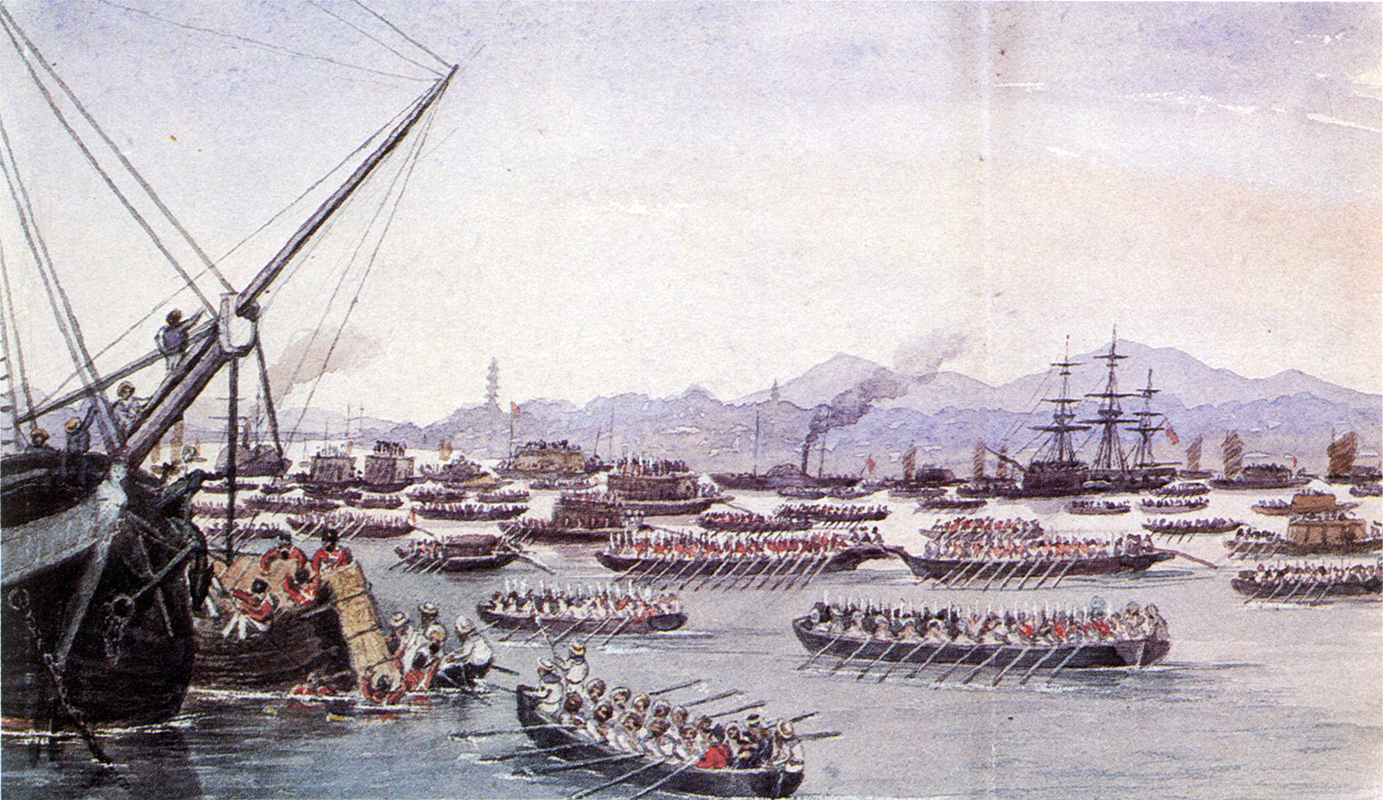
- The British sailing towards the besieged city on 24 May
Date	21–30 May 1841
Location	Canton, Guangdong, China
Result	British victory

Belligerents
United Kingdom: British East India Company	Qing China

Commanders and leaders
Hugh Gough	Yishan; Yang Fang

Strength
6,000; 2 steamers 7 other ships	45,000; 4 forts

Casualties and losses
15 killed 112 wounded	1,000 killed 1,750 wounded 4 forts captured (Note: The Qing acknowledged that 500 Tartar (Manchu) troops were killed and 1,500 wounded on 25 May.)
- Casualties source

The Second Battle of Canton (Chinese: 第二次廣州之戰) was fought between British and Chinese forces in Canton (Guangzhou), Guangdong province, China, in May 1841 during the First Opium War.

== Background ==
Canton was the only port in China open to foreign countries, mostly European, for trade under the Canton System. In the early stages of this commerce the demand in foreign countries for commodities including tea, silk and porcelain greatly outweighed Chinese needs for foreign products, and thus a significant trade imbalance developed. This unequal situation ended in the late 18th century when opium was shipped into China from plantations in India owned by the British East India Company. The number of people using the drug in China grew rapidly, to the point that the trade imbalance shifted in the foreign countries' favor. In 1839 matters came to a head when Chinese official Lin Zexu tried to end the opium trade altogether by destroying a large amount of opium in Canton, thereby triggering the First Opium War.

In response to Zexu's actions, in January 1841 the Royal Navy bombarded Chinese positions near Canton and landed troops ashore in several locations. Local officials surrendered and signed peace treaties with the British. When they brought these peace treaties to Beijing they were punished for their failures. The Qing dynasty government refused to acknowledge the treaties, nor did they acknowledge any Chinese territory had been lost. Instead, they sent in more troops to drive back the British.

== Battle ==
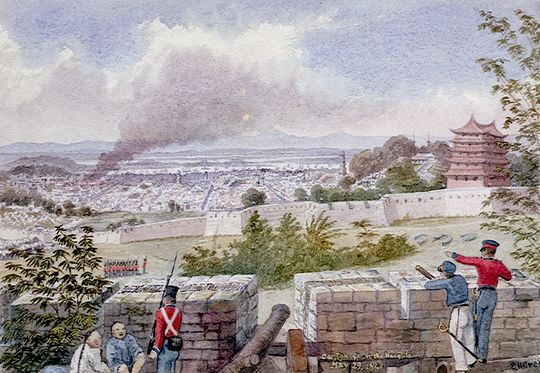
British bombardment of Canton from the surrounding heights

On May 21 Chinese forces attempted a night ambush on British positions in the hills to the north of Canton but were repelled.

By 2:00 am on the 24th a contingent of naval and land units under Maj. Gen. Hugh Gough assembled, ready to attack the city. The right column, towed by the steamer Atlanta, comprised around 330 men of the 26th Cameronian, Madras Artillery and an officer of the Engineers. They were to attack and hold the factories with support from the men-of-war anchored on the Canton River. The left column towed by Nemesis consisted of more than 700 troops drawn from regiments that included the 49th Foot, 27th Madras Infantry and Bengal Volunteers along with 380 Royal Marines. The right column reached its objective by 5:00 pm under Maj. Pratt of the 26th Cameronians, who held his men ready for defensive or offensive action.

The large number of troop-carrying vessels under tow by Nemesis slowed her progress and she did not reach the bank next to the village of Tsing-Hae, some five miles up river, until dusk. Gough landed with the 49th Foot and carried out reconnaissance while other troops unloaded artillery from the ships. In his official report he later noted, "The heights to the north of Canton were crowned by four strong forts and the city walls, which run over the southern extremity of these heights, appeared to be about three miles and a half distant." At 3:00 and already under bombardment from the two Western forts, British troops set up a rocket battery, two 5 1/2 mortars, two 12-pounder howitzers and two nine-pounder guns, then returned fire. Under cover of the artillery, Lt. Col. Morris and the 49th, supported by the 37th Madras Native Infantry and Bengal Volunteers, had orders to advance up a hill to his left towards the nearest eastern fort. Meanwhile, the 18th Royal Irish under Maj. Gen. Burrell, with the Royal Marines in support, were to move forward to protect Morris' flank. At the same time Gough ordered the brigade of seamen to attack the two western forts but the sudden approach of a large body of enemy troops from the right forced him to detach the marines under Capt. Ellis to cover the right and rear. Together with an artillery brigade under the command of Capt. Knowles, Royal Artillery and the crews and troops of the attached naval squadrons, Gough had a total of around 6,000 men under his command. When the advance sounded, the troops attacked, captured the four forts with comparatively small losses, and within a half-hour "British troops looked down on Canton within 100 paces of its walls."

Forts captured during the Second Battle of Canton
Fort name	Number of guns
Yung-Kang-Tai	13
She-Tung-Pao	6
Pa'on-Keih-Tai	11
Kang-Keih-Tai	19
Total	49

To the northeast, a force of about 4,000 enemy troops—by Gough's reckoning—advanced across the open paddy fields and made a number of attacks on the British. They were repelled by the 49th, then at 3:00 pm on the 25th the "Tatar General" Yang Fang arrived and rallied the Chinese. Gough ordered the 18th, with a company of marines, to reinforce the 49th and put Maj. Gen. Burrell in charge of repelling the predicted attack. The British then routed the enemy, burned down their encampment and blew up several magazines.

Although ready to take the city on the morning of May 26th, a white flag appeared on the city walls at 10:00 am. Gough sent interpreter Peter Perring Thoms, on secondment from British Plenipotentiary and Superintendent of Trade Charles Elliot, to find out what it meant. When a Mandarin explained that the Chinese wanted peace, Gough notes in his official report: "I had it explained that, as General commanding the British, I would treat with none but the General commanding the Chinese troops, that we came before Canton much against the wishes of the British nation, but that repeated insults and breaches of faith had compelled us to make the present movement, and that I would cease from hostilities for two hours to enable their General to meet me and Sir Le Fleming Senhouse." When no general appeared, the next day British forces prepared once more for the attack on Canton. This time, a message arrived from Charles Elliot announcing that he had come to an agreement with the governor-general of Canton, Yu Baochen (余葆纯) according to the following key points:

- A $6-million indemnity payable by the Chinese within one week; the first one million due immediately.
- Chinese troops to withdraw to at least 60 miles (97 km) from Canton.
- British forces to withdraw down the Pearl River to The Bogue.
- The issue of the cessation of Hong Kong deferred pending further negotiations.
- Prisoners-of-war to be exchanged.

Gough was to hold his position until further notice. What happened next became known as the Sanyuanli incident and involved a small contingent of British troops suffering minor casualties as a result of attacks by a Chinese mob incensed at the presence of foreign troops in their country. What the British regarded as a minor skirmish became a cause celebre for the Chinese and grew in importance over the years to take on almost mythic proportions. The city surrendered shortly thereafter and paid the British as agreed. As a result, Canton was not totally destroyed, although after the battle elements of the British forces looted the city. Chinese reinforcements from other nearby cities and counties retreated from Canton on May 28. At the same time the British also withdrew. By June 1 all British forces had left the Canton area.

== Aftermath ==
According to historian Frederick Wakeman,

"Out of the humiliating military defeats of the Opium War [the Chinese] have been able to extract a great popular victory, blemished only by the cowardice of Qing officials. Today, on the mainland, every child's history book contains an account of the battle. Every tablet, every shrine to the Sanyuanli dead, has been carefully tabulated by the local history bureau of the province: a Bunker Hill and an Alamo rolled into one."

Although the battle had a minor effect on the overall course of the conflict, the Sanyuanli incident had a major effect on the Chinese public. The incident was the first time where civilians had taken up arms to attack a foreign power in the history of the Qing dynasty, demonstrating an increasing lack of faith in the Qing government. To the Chinese public, the incident demonstrated that though government officials and troops were powerless in the face of the British, civilian resistance could succeed in driving back foreign troops. Stories and rumours surrounding the incident led the Chinese public to believe that local militias and paramilitaries would be the only successful way to defeat the British and nurtured a general climate of anti-government dissatisfaction, which helped pave the way for the Taiping and Boxer Rebellions that came to plague the Qing government later on.

== Gallery ==
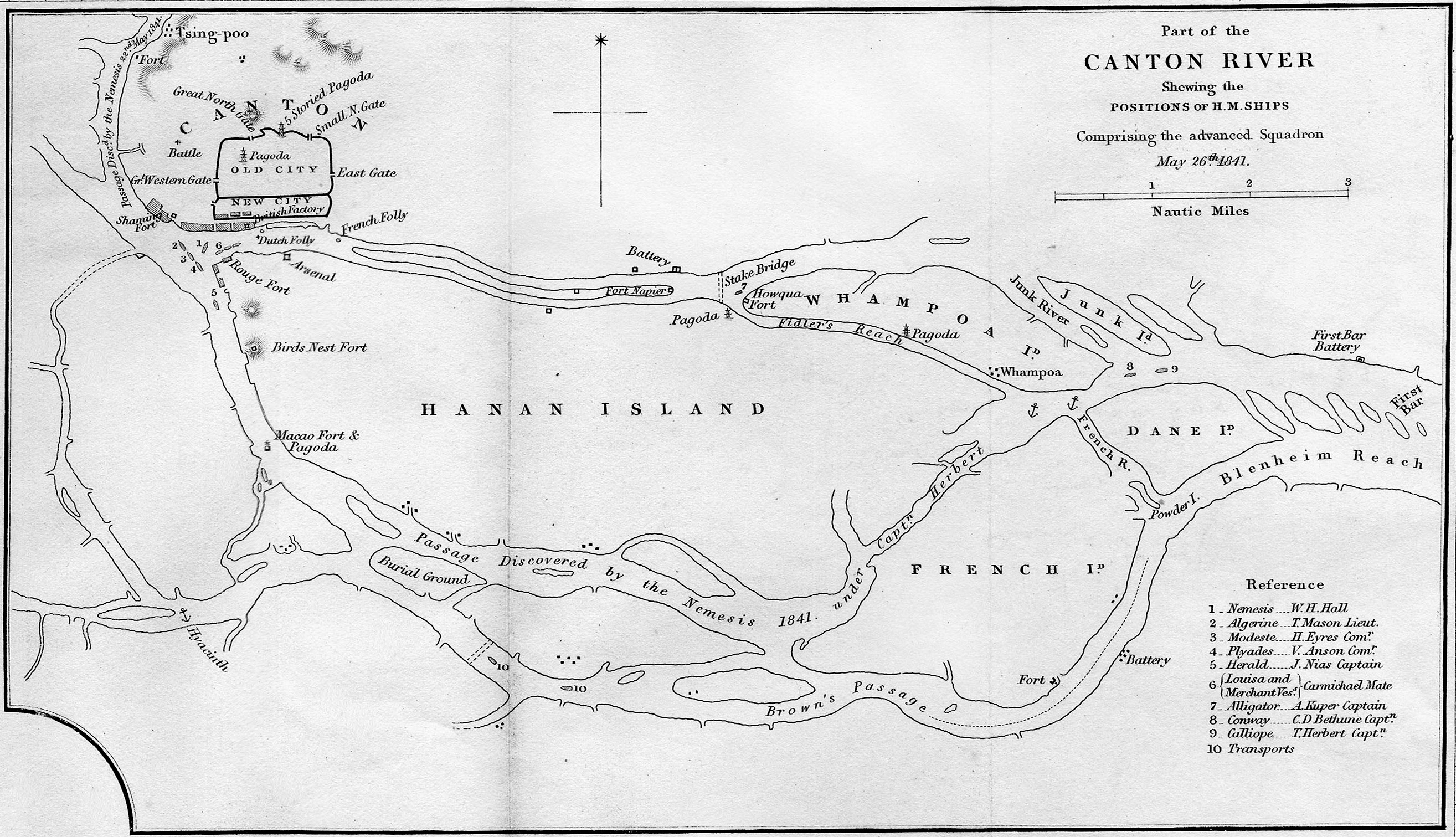
Map of the position of British ships in the Canton River, 26 May

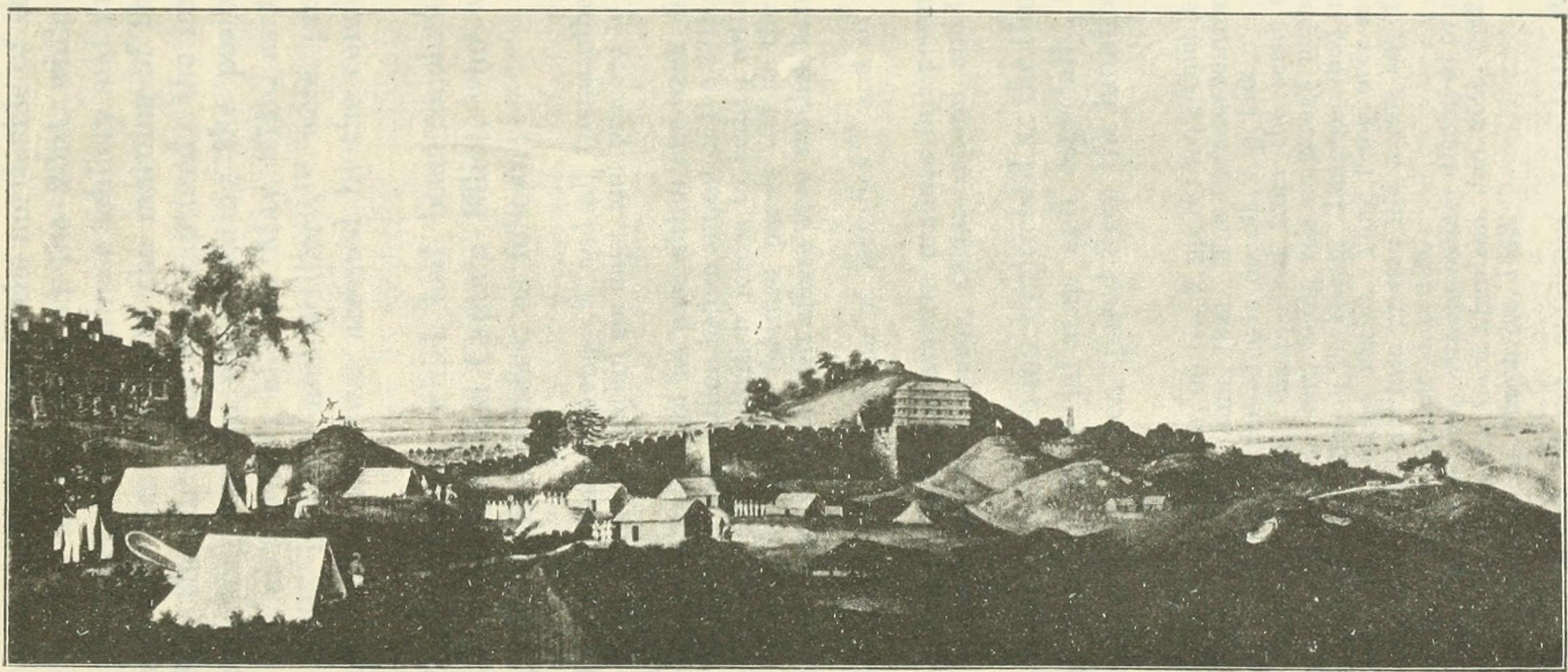
Preparing for the assault on the city, 27 May

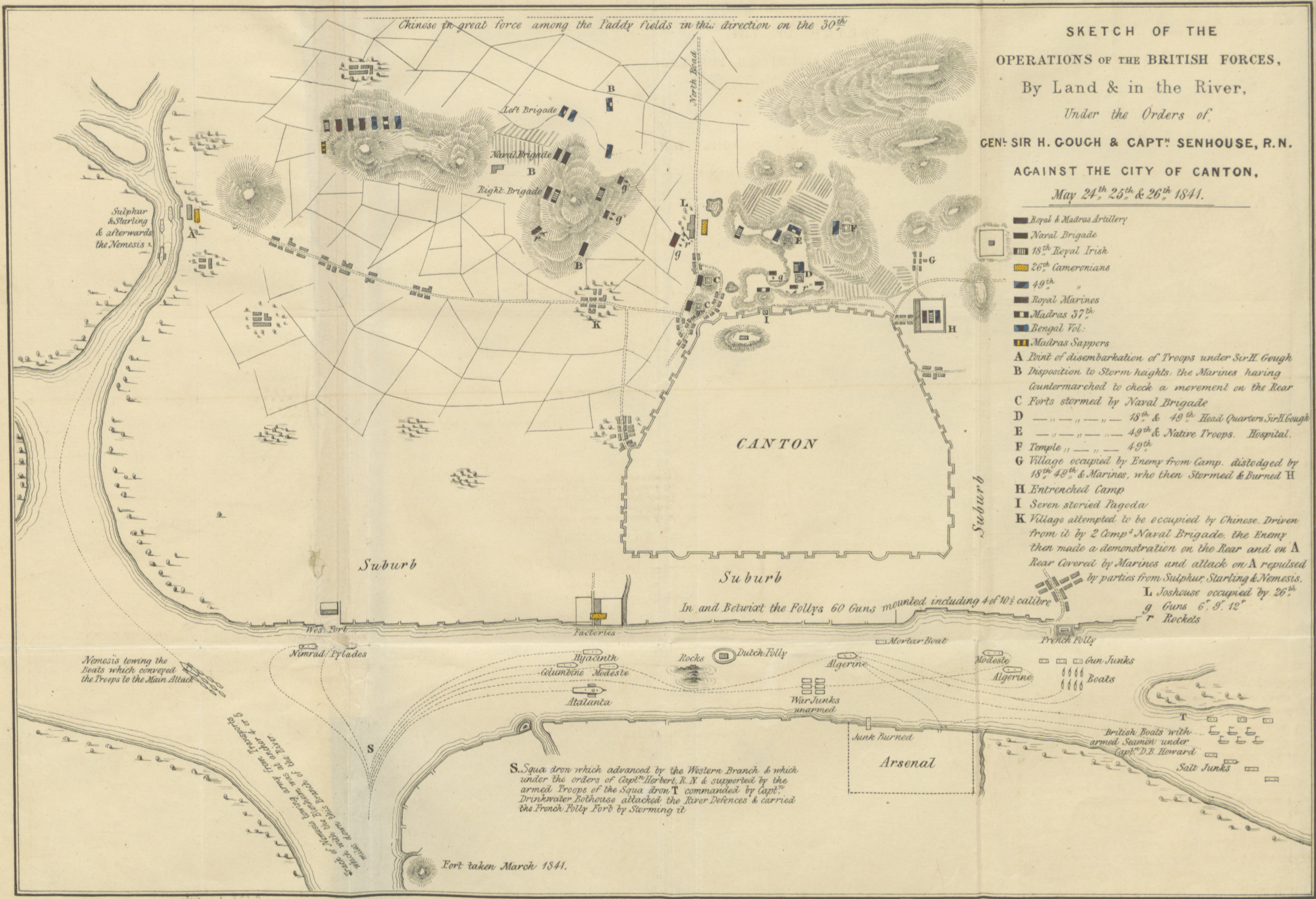
Map of the army and naval operations

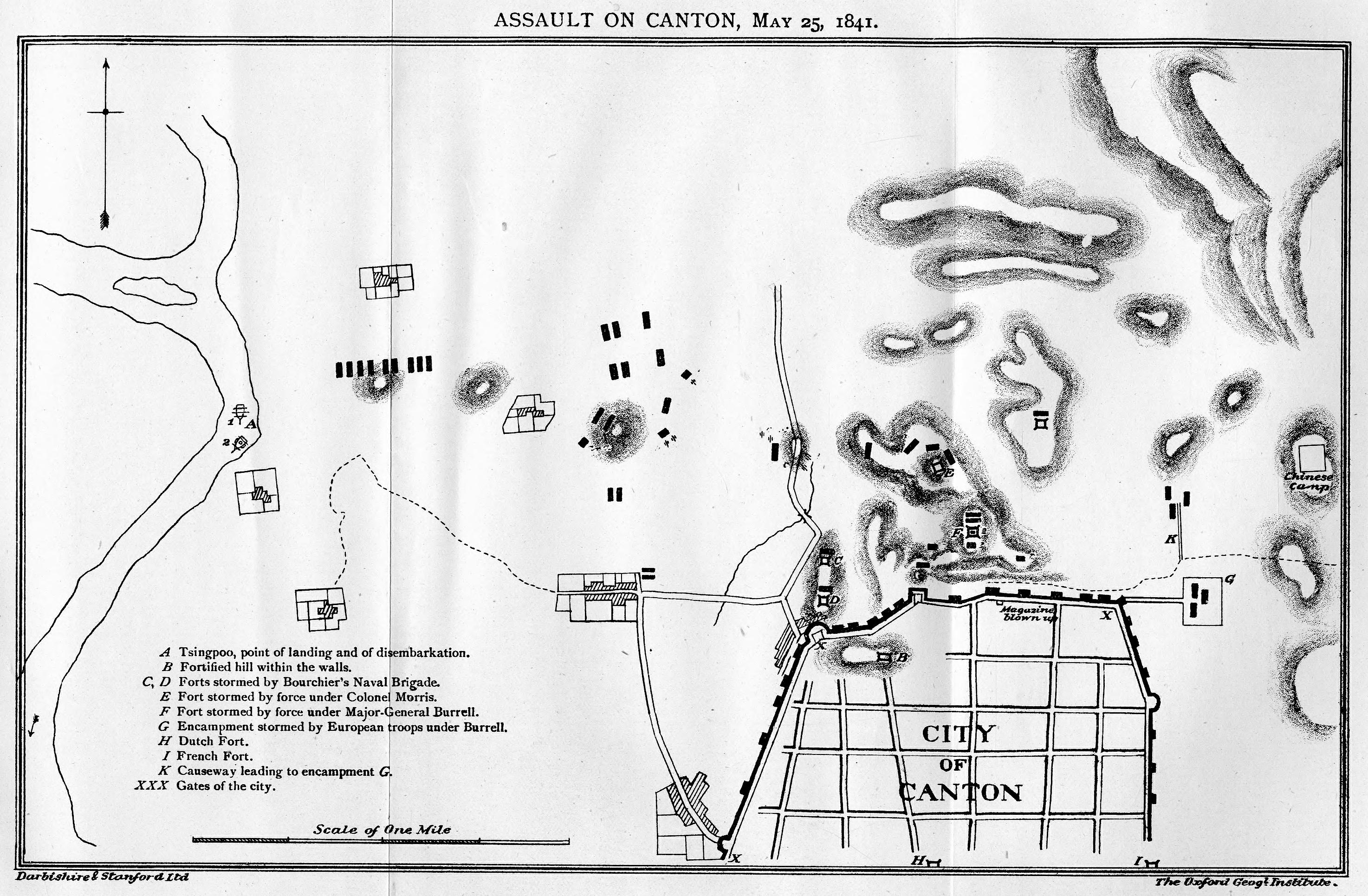
Map of the land operations

== Notes ==
1. Bulletins and Other State Intelligence (1841), p. 686
2. Major-General Hugh Gough reported 45,000 men. (MacPherson (1843), p. 306); Military Secretary Keith Mackenzie reported an estimate of between 31,000 and 56,000. (Mackenzie (1842), p. 131-132
3. Pinyin: Qìnhăi (沁海), marked on some campaign maps of the time as "Tsing-poo", (沁浦). The location no longer exists
