= Yang Fang (general) =

Qing dynasty general (1770–1846)

- Traditional Chinese: 楊芳
- Simplified Chinese: 杨芳
Transcriptions
Standard Mandarin
- Hanyu Pinyin: Yáng Fāng

Courtesy name
- Traditional Chinese: 誠村
- Simplified Chinese: 诚村
Transcriptions
Standard Mandarin
- Hanyu Pinyin: Chéngcūn

Yang Fang (1770–1846) was a Han Chinese general and diplomat during the Qing dynasty (1644–1911). Born in Songtao, Guizhou Province (modern day Songtao Miao Autonomous County), he joined the military as a young man and became a secretary, where he came to the attention of General Yang Yuchun (楊遇春/杨遇春 1760–1837), who recommended him for military school.

== Career ==
After completing his military training, Yang was involved in the suppression of the White Lotus Rebellion (1794–1804). In 1826, the sixth year of the reign of the Daoguang Emperor, Yang joined an army that marched north to Xinjiang to suppress a rebellion led by Altishahri warlord Jahangir Khoja. For his outstanding service during the mission he was rewarded with the title of Grand Tutor to the Heir Apparent (Tàizǐ Tàifù, 太子太傅).

Promotions piled up and by 1839 Yang had held titles including Military Commander of Guangdong and Guangxi as well as Governor-general of Gansu, Zhili, Hunan and Sichuan.

When the First Opium War broke out (from the Chinese perspective) in June 1840, Qing Special Commissioners Lin Zexu and Deng Tingzhen were resolute in their opposition to the British but their successor Qishan instead sought compromise. In January the following year, Daoguang declared war on Great Britain. He appointed "Qishan Pacifier of the Rebellious" (Jìngnì, 靖逆) and made Yang Fang and Long Wen (隆文) ministerial attaches (Cānzàn Dàchén, 參贊大臣).

Yang Fang disagreed with the terms of the Convention of Chuenpi signed by Qishan and British Plenipotentiary Charles Elliot in January 1841 and on March 5, he arrived in Canton with a thousand troops from Hunan Province. Aged 71 and so deaf that communication with him had to be in writing, Fang led Chinese troops in an attack at the Second Battle of Canton, which ended when further negotiations between the two sides temporarily terminated hostilities. Yang Fang was subsequently reprimanded by the emperor for agreeing to a truce instead of resisting. A disappointed Yang Fang remained in Canton until a fall from his horse forced him to return to Hunan to recuperate. In 1843 he received his retirement orders from Daoguang. His career had spanned over 50 years and aside from his military exploits he had remained an indefatigable writer, poet and calligrapher.
