= Sanyuanli =

Neighbourhood in Guangzhou, China

Coordinates: 23.1584°N 113.2602°E

Sanyuanli (Chinese: 三元里; pinyin: sán yuán lǐ) is a neighbourhood in Baiyun District, in the northern suburbs of Guangzhou, Guangdong Province. Sanyuanli Subdistrict (三元里街道) was created in 1987 and covers an area of 6.8 square km, with a population of 85,000 residents, 20,000 migrants, and approximately 100,000 unregistered floating population.

== Sanyuanli People's Anti-British Monument ==
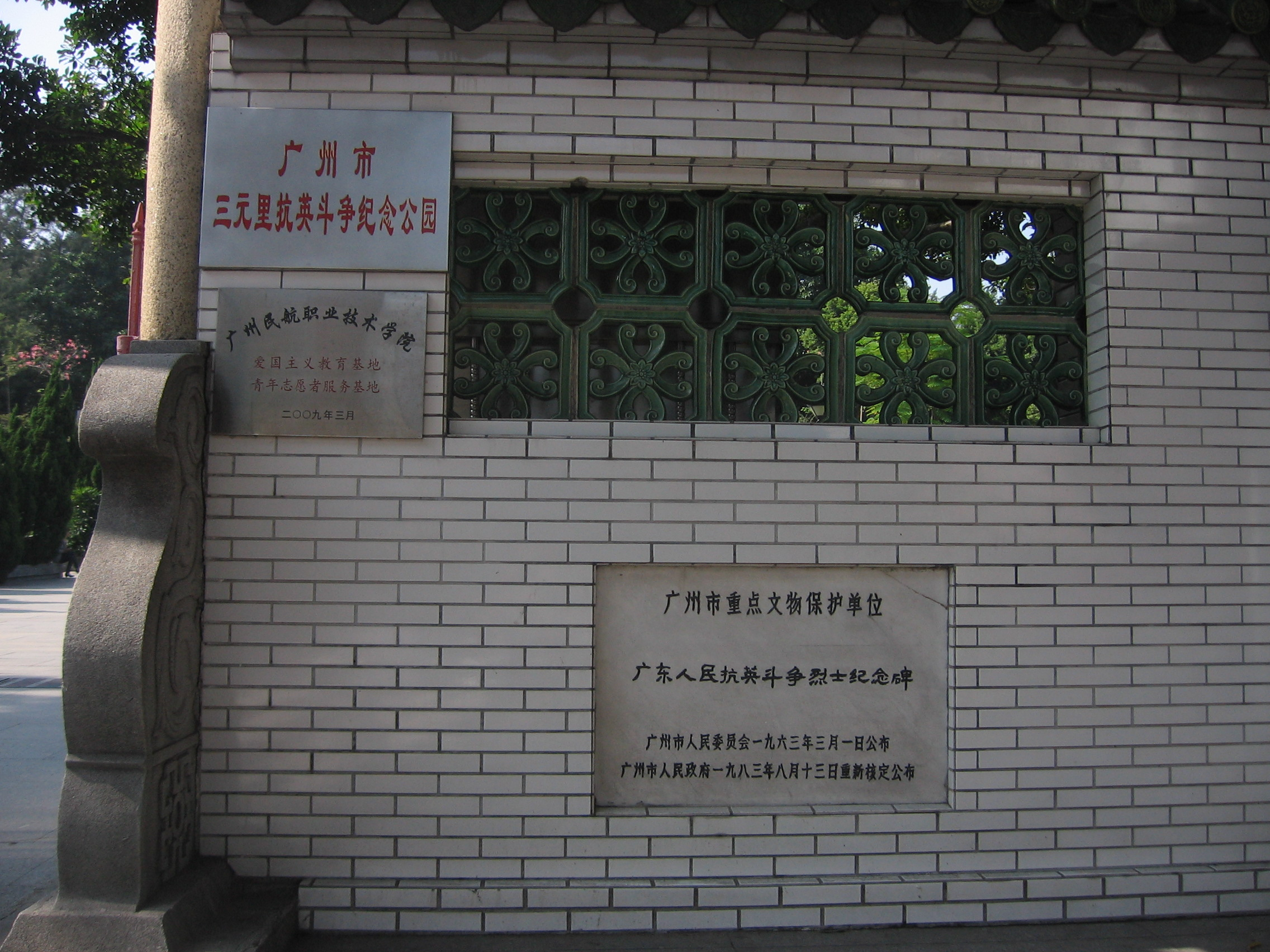
Sanyuanli Incident Memorial Park

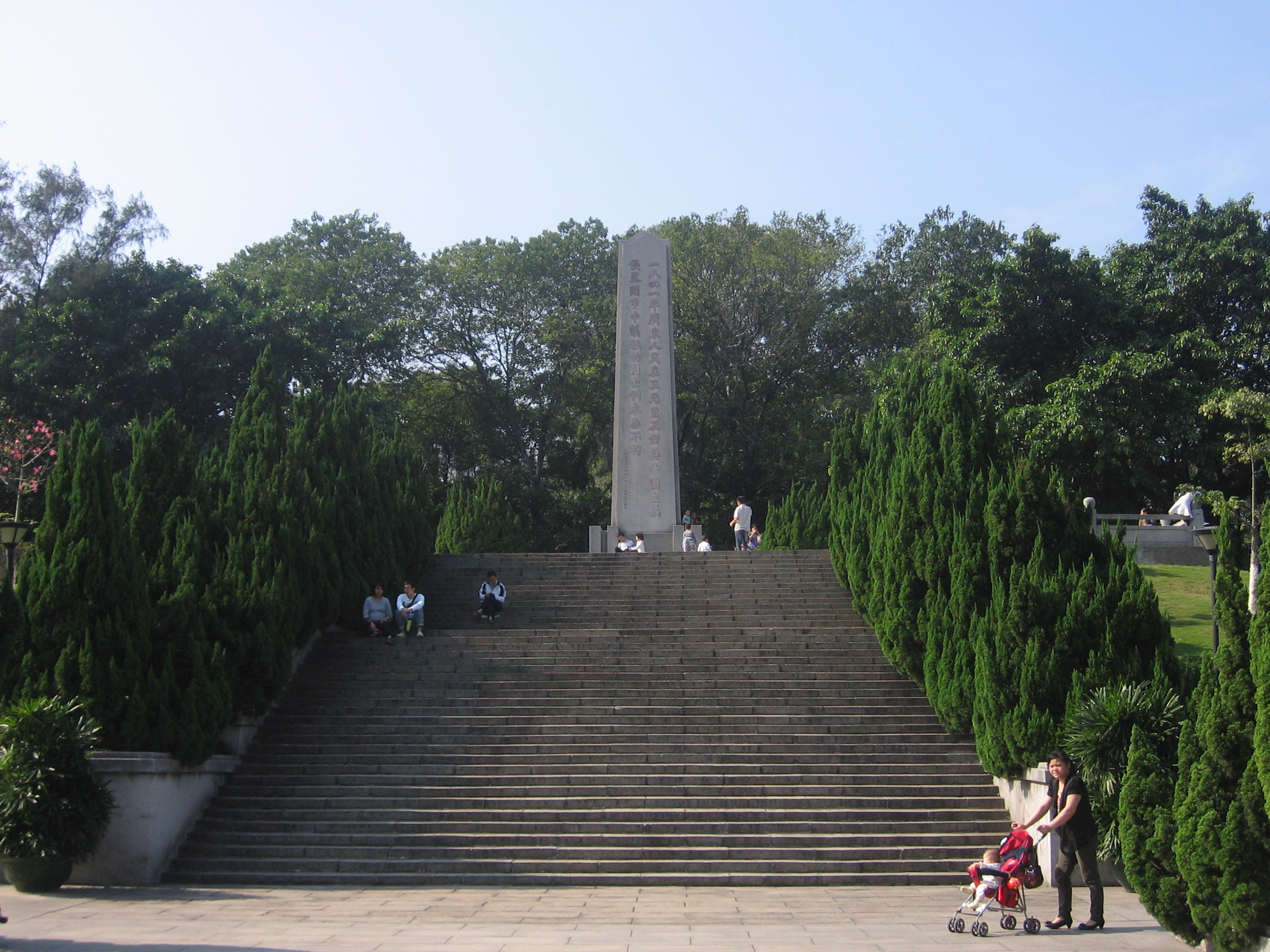
Sanyuanli Revolutionary Martyrs Monument

To praise the heroic history of the heroes in Sanyuanli, in October 1950, Guangzhou Government set up a Sanyuanli Revolutionary Martyrs Monument in a hillock of Ximen building (西门楼). Around the monument, there is the Sanyuanli Incident Memorial Park. The park covers an area of 7920 square kilometers, with a solemn and serene architectural style.

== Sanyuanli Temple ==
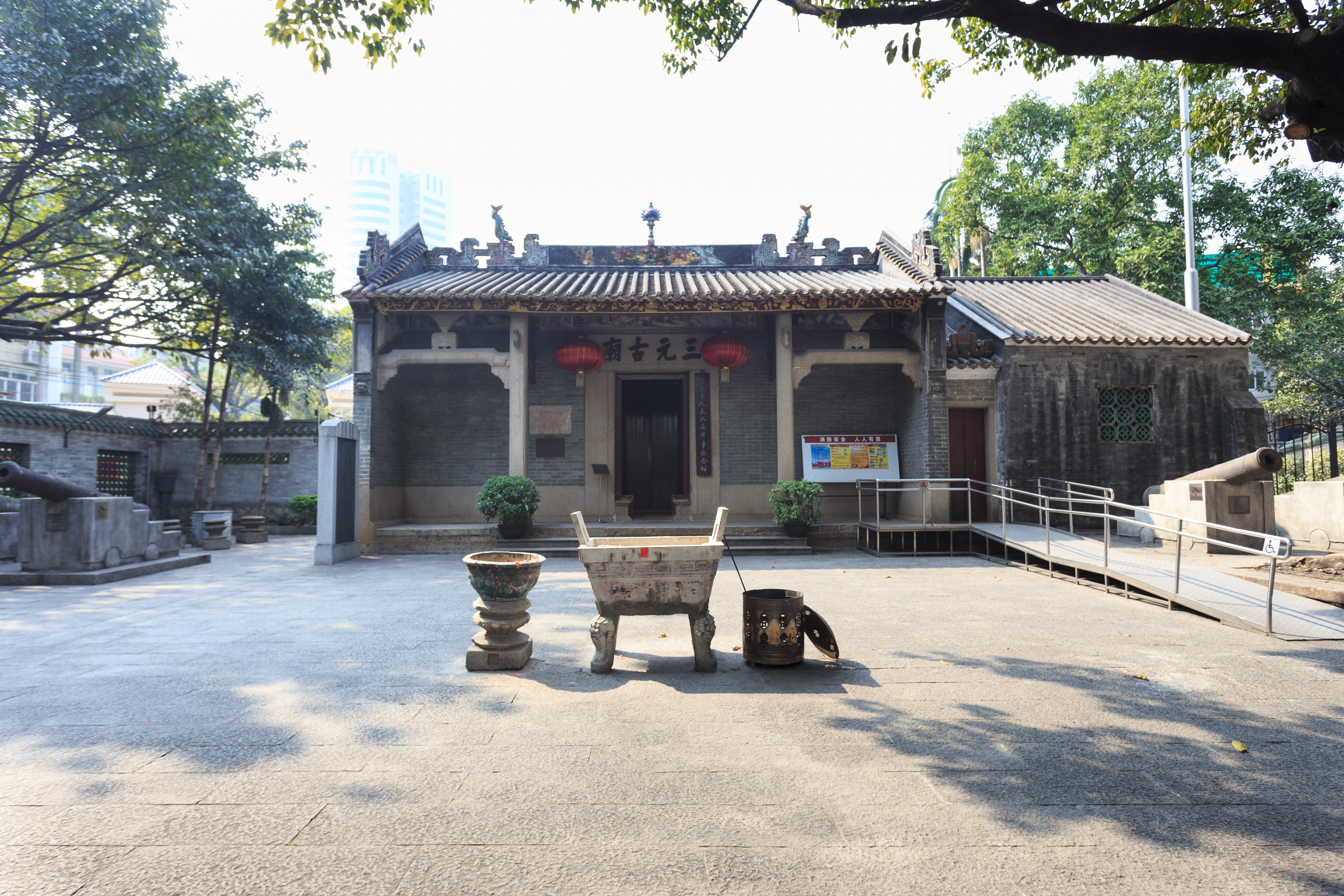
Sanyuanli Temple

Sanyuanli Incident Museum is located in Sanyuanli Temple. The temple was Taoist temple for worshipping Taoist God. During the first Opium War, people in Sanyuanli took a mass pledge in front of the temple, which was the beginning of the anti-aggression war of Chinese. Therefore, Sanyuanli temple has become an important historical revolutionary site. In post-war time, Guangzhou Government has conducted several renovations for the temple in order to keep its original appearance. In 1961, Sanyuanli Temple became one of the cultural buildings under National Relic Protection, and it was renamed as Sanyuanli Anti-British Revolt Museum. Until now, the museum is one of the Patriotism Educational Sites in Guangzhou, Guangdong and China range.

== Schools and hospitals ==
Sanyuanli Middle School (三元里中学), Ziyuangang middle school (梓元岗中学), Sanyuanli primary school (三元里小学), Baishijia primary school (百事佳小学), Sanyuanli kindergarten (三元里公办幼儿园) were set up in Sanyuanli neighborhood. The First Affiliated Hospital of Guangzhou University of Chinese Medicine, and the Civil Hospital are also located in Sanyuanli.

== Sanyuanli station ==
Sanyuanli station (Chinese: 三元里站) is a Train station of Line 2 of the Guangzhou Metro. It started operations on 29 December 2002. It is located in Sanyuanli, Baiyun District. It is adjacent to Sanyuanli Anti-British Invasion Museum (Chinese: 三元里抗英纪念碑), Sanyuanli Coach Terminal (Chinese: 三元里客运站), Guangzhou Airport Expressway (Chinese: 广州机场高速公路) and Jingzhu Expressway (Chinese: 京珠高速公路; lit. 'Beijing-Zhuhai Expressway').
