= National priority protected site =

Historic sites in China

- Temple of Heaven, one from the first batch of China's national priority protected sites
- Simplified Chinese: 全国重点文物保护单位
- Traditional Chinese: 全國重點文物保護單位
- Literal meaning: National key cultural relic protected unit
Transcriptions
Standard Mandarin
- Hanyu Pinyin: Quánguó Zhòngdiǎn Wénwù Bǎohù Dānwèi

A national priority protected site is the highest-level national protection for immovable cultural relics in China. The designation was first created under the 1961 Provisional Regulations on the Protection and Management of Cultural Relics, which evolved into the Law on the Protection of Cultural Relics.

According to the 2002 Cultural Relics Protection Law of the People's Republic of China, the National Cultural Heritage Administration of the State Council selects those with significant historical, artistic, and scientific value as national key cultural relics protection units. National key cultural relics protection units shall not be demolished; if they need to be relocated, they must be reported to the State Council for approval by applications from the people's government of the provincial administrative region.

== Statistics ==
In 1999 it was reported that there were some 350,000 immovable cultural properties in China, of which 70,000 were protected at one of the three main levels, in addition to some 10,000,000 movable cultural properties held by state institutions alone. Of these, as of October 2019, 5,058 Sites Protected at the National Level have been designated by the State Administration. They were announced in eight batches and several supplemental batches:

Batch No.	Date	Added	Merged (Note: Non-listed monuments that were merged into Sites already in the list. Multiple monuments that were merged into one Site may be counted as one or more depending on the official announcement.)	Ref.
1	4 March 1961	180		
1a	26 October 1964	−1 (Note: The Loyal King's Residence (忠王府) was removed from the list on 26 October 1964 and was re-designated on 16 October 1981.)		
1b	16 October 1981	1		
2	23 February 1982	62		
3	13 January 1988	258		
4	20 November 1996	250	12	
5	25 June 2001	518 (-1 (Note: 3 non-listed Hanque, Zhaojiacun Hanque (赵家村汉阙), Wangjiaping Hanque (王家坪汉阙), Pujiawan Hanque (蒲家湾汉阙), and another 2 from the first batch, Feng Huan Que (冯焕阙) and Shen Fujun Que (沈府君阙), were merged and renamed to "Qu County Hanque" (渠县汉阙).))	23	
5a	22 November 2002	1		
5b	2 March 2003	1		
5c	3 April 2003	1		
6	25 May 2006	1,080	106	
6a	20 August 2009	1		
7	5 March 2013	1,943 (+1 (Note: Dasheng Cotton Mill (大生纱厂) was merged into Nantong Museum when the 6th batch was announced. At the 7th batch, Dasheng Cotton Mill, along with a non-listed Dasheng third textile company (大生第三纺织公司) which was merged into it, became a separate site.))	47	
7a	25 April 2014	1		
8	7 October 2019	762	50	
Total		5,058		

== Sites protected at various levels ==
Sites (to Be) Protected for Their Historical and Cultural Value or Historical and Cultural Sites Protected (文物保护单位) at various levels include:

- Major Historical and Cultural Sites Protected at the National Level (全国重点文物保护单位)
- Historical and Cultural Sites Protected at the Provincial Level (省级文物保护单位)
- Historical and Cultural Sites Protected at the Level of a City Divided into Districts or at the Level of an Autonomous Prefecture (设区的市、自治州级文物保护单位)
- Historical and Cultural Sites Protected at the County Level (县级文物保护单位)

== See also ==
- Principles for the Conservation of Heritage Sites in China
- World Heritage Sites in China
- Tourist Attraction Rating Categories of China
