= Henry Smith (Royal Navy officer) =

Royal Navy Admiral (1803–1887)

Admiral Sir Henry Smith KCB
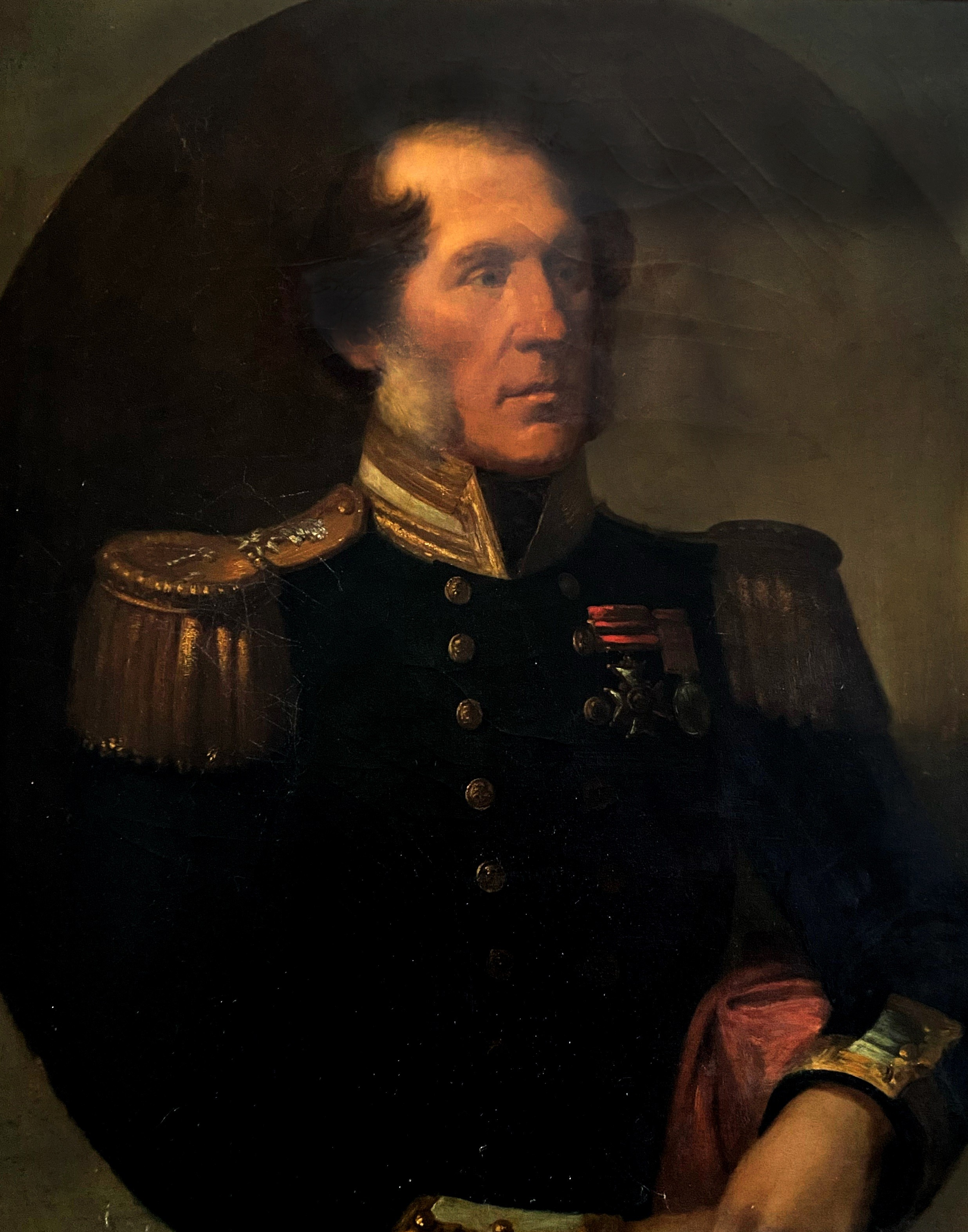
- Smith as an admiral
- Born: 1803
- Died: 18 January 1887 (aged 84); Florence
- Military career
- Allegiance: United Kingdom
- Branch: Royal Navy
- Service years: 1814–1873
- Rank: Admiral
- Commands: HMS Ferret; HMS Arachne; HMS Magnificent; HMS Volage; HMS Druid; HMS Ganges; HMS Neptune; HMS Prince Regent
- Conflicts: Aden Expedition; First Opium War; Battle of Kowloon; Battle of Chuenpi; Battle of the Barrier; Second Battle of Chuenpi; Battle of the Bogue; Battle of Canton; Battle of Amoy; Crimean War; Åland War

Admiral Sir Henry Smith KCB (1803 – 18 January 1887) was a British officer in the Royal Navy most known for his command of the Aden Expedition and participation in the First Opium War.

Smith commanded the Aden Expedition in 1839 which took Aden as the first colonial acquisition of the reign of Queen Victoria. For this service he was appointed a Companion of the Order of the Bath. Smith was then sent to serve on the China Station, where he fired the first shot of the First Opium War at the Battle of Kowloon. He played an important role at the controversial Battle of Chuenpi later in the year, and as senior naval officer on the south coast of China fought the Battle of the Barrier. He later participated in the Battles of Second Chuenpi, the Bogue, and Canton, before forming part of the Amoy garrison after the Battle of Amoy.

Having left China in 1843, Smith went on to command ships in the Mediterranean and then in the Baltic Sea during the Crimean War. Smith never served at sea again after obtaining flag rank in 1855 but became superintendent of the Royal Hospital Haslar and the Royal Clarence Yard. He was appointed a Knight Commander of the Order of the Bath in 1873, retiring in the same year.

== Naval career ==
=== Early career ===
Henry Smith was born around 1803; he joined the Royal Navy in 1814. He was promoted to lieutenant on 19 July 1821 and was appointed on 25 April 1823 to serve as such on the ship of the line HMS Genoa on the Lisbon Station. Smith left Genoa midway through 1825 and some time soon afterwards joined the brig-sloop HMS Pelican in the eastern Mediterranean Sea. Pelican served on anti-piracy duties, taking the schooner Aphrodite on 3 January 1827; on 2 March another Turkish ship was investigated by Pelican and through her obstinacy in refusing to be searched by Pelican was deemed to also be a pirate. Smith was one of a number of men sent across to the ship to destroy it, killing two crew members and wounding four others; Smith distinguished himself in the fight and at the same time was badly injured.

Smith was appointed first lieutenant of the brig-sloop HMS Fairy on 7 May. In Fairy Smith sailed for the West Indies where on 3 February 1828 he was promoted to commander and given command of the brig-sloop HMS Ferret. On 14 April Smith transferred to command another brig-sloop, HMS Arachne. He was then made acting-captain of the receiving ship HMS Magnificent at Jamaica on 8 September 1829 and officially promoted to post captain in 1831 with seniority from the beginning of his tenure as acting-captain. While commanding Magnificent Smith was the senior officer at Port Royal and received the thanks of the mercantile community there for his assistance with Jamaica's commercial interests.

=== Aden ===
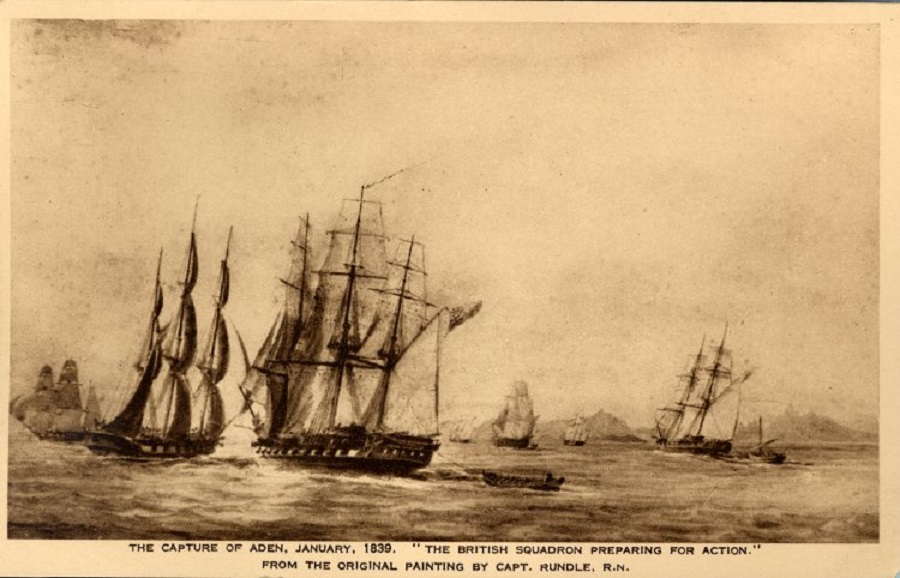
The capture of Aden

On 27 November 1837 Smith was sent to the East Indies Station in command of the frigate HMS Volage. In January 1838 the Sultanate of Lahej agreed to transfer a number of its possessions, including the town of Aden to Britain but later decided against this and opened fire on the sloop-of-war HCS Coote. Smith was given command of an expedition, comprising Volage, the brig HMS Cruizer, Coote, the schooner HCS Mahé, and three transports, to secure Aden. Smith and his small expedition arrived at Aden on 16 January 1839 and in the morning of 18 January Volage, Cruizer, and Mahé sailed to the front of the town from where they were fired upon.

At 9.30 a.m. the rest of the expedition arrived and the warships sailed in close to Aden's batteries to bombard them. By 11 a.m. the gunnery of the ships had demolished Aden's lower batteries and destroyed a large tower, while landing parties ordered by Smith had cleared out the remaining enemy musket men in the rubble. At this point Smith ordered the main two landings of troops to take place, which were completed successfully with two naval casualties and sixteen from the army, with the defending garrison of 1,000 men suffering around fifty casualties. This was the first colonial acquisition of the reign of Queen Victoria. Aden was later purchased by the East India Company and used as a coalling station. For his capture of Aden Smith was nominated a Companion of the Order of the Bath on 13 August and received the thanks of the George Eden, 1st Earl of Auckland, the Governor General of India.

=== China ===
==== Opening shots of the Opium War ====
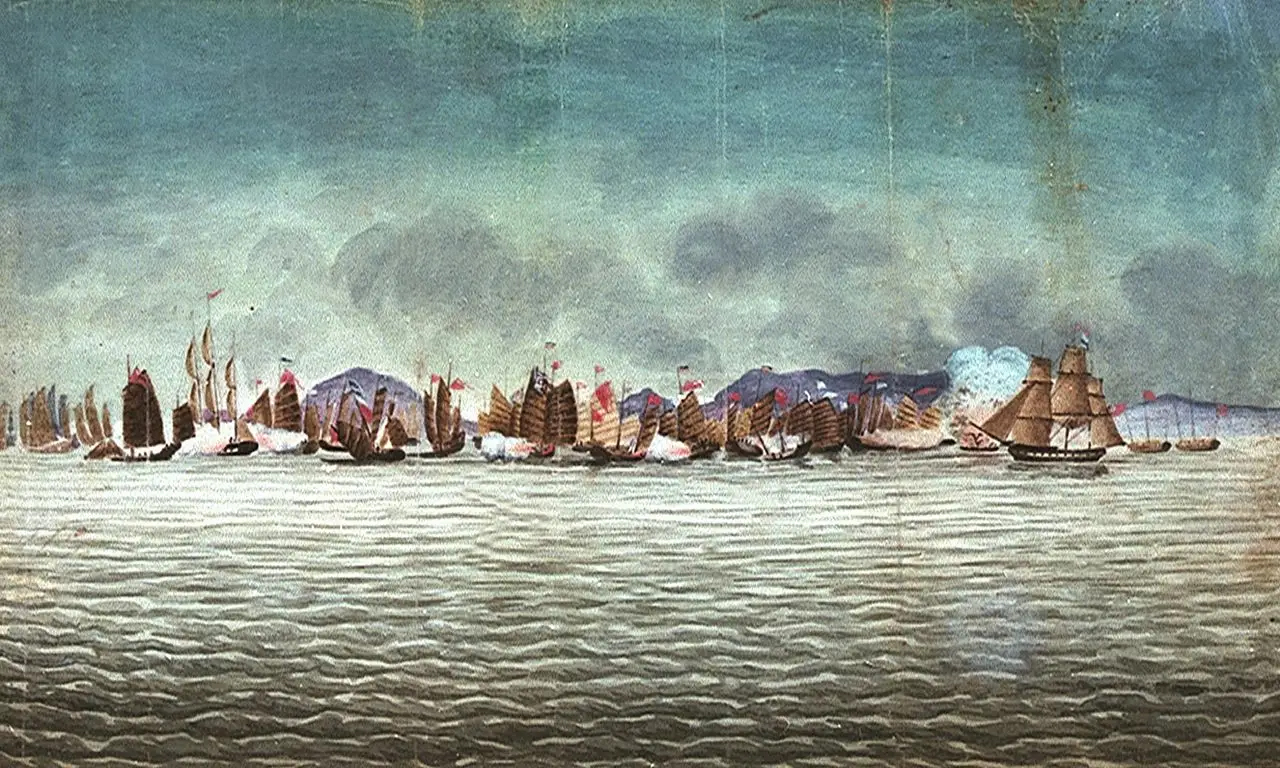
The Battle of Chuenpi

Volage and Smith subsequently sailed for China, arriving at Macao on 30 August and then immediately sailing for Hong Kong. On 4 September the Chinese at Kowloon refused to continue supplying provisions to the British contingent there. Negotiations broke down and the British were worried that their water supplies would be poisoned and so at 2 p.m. Smith, present in Volage's pinnace alongside several other small boats, fired at the nearest ship of the Chinese squadron of war junks. This was the opening shot of the First Opium War. While the Chinese ships were severely outdated, eventually the British began to run out of ammunition and they retreated. Smith's commanding officer, the Chief Superintendent of British Trade Captain Charles Elliot, called off any further attacks. Smith had to be persuaded not to return with Volage to destroy the junks and the battery protecting them. A frigate action was deemed less politically acceptable than a small-scale boat action. Despite the failure of Smith's action, several days later the Chinese opened trade with Hong Kong again, having received considerable damage to their warships in the attack. Relations with the Chinese continued to sour and on 11 September Smith was ordered by Elliot to blockade Canton in order to stop British trade with the Chinese while they refused to accept ships with opium on board.

The Chinese then began to offer British merchantmen a bond to sign promising that they were not carrying opium, and on 14 October the first British ship bypassed the blockade to accept this. A fleet of twenty-nine junks was then sent out to the British shipping waiting at Chuenpi to enter Canton. The ships there also included refugees that had escaped Macao after the crackdown on opium sellers. On 2 November Elliot arrived there with Volage and the sloop-of-war HMS Hyacinth to negotiate the matter. This quickly led to an impasse. Volage and Hyacinth subsequently opened fire on the Chinese fleet, beginning the Battle of Chuenpi. The British claimed that this was because the Chinese were threatening the merchant fleet, and allowing them to stay there overnight could allow the ships to be attacked. The Chinese, on the other hand, wrote that the British forced another merchant ship to stop attempting to break the blockade, and fired into the Chinese when they responded to this. Volage and Hyacinth ran along the line of the junks, destroying three of them before a ceasefire was brokered and the Chinese retired. (Note: The Chinese claimed victory in the battle, claiming that they knocked the figurehead off one of the British warships and drowned 'many European soldiers'.) Smith did not agree with Elliot's move to stop the engagement, and was furious.

On 30 June 1840 Smith was given command of another frigate, HMS Druid, in which he continued to blockade the Chinese, taking eight merchant ships as prize by 10 July as senior naval officer on the south of the Chinese coast. On 6 August the missionary Vincent John Stanton was captured by the Chinese while swimming in Casilha Bay near Macao and Smith took a small squadron of ships to avenge this. Smith's force consisted of Druid, the sloops-of-war HMS Larne and Hyacinth, and two smaller vessels. On 19 August Smith with 120 Royal Marines, 80 seamen, and 180 local volunteers, successfully fought the Battle of the Barrier in which he attacked the Chinese works and barracks at Portas do Cerco, including destroying seventeen guns and two junks; casualties were light, with four of the British wounded. By 7 p.m. the entire force had reembarked on the ships and left the area ablaze, with so many cannonballs having been fired by the ships that they picked up their used shot to recycle it before leaving. It was said of Smith's actions at the battle that 'seldom has a more signal service been rendered in so short a space of time'. Druid continued after this to protect British trade and hunt down pirates, at one point having several men of a boarding party killed when the junk they were investigating blew up.

==== Attacks on Canton ====
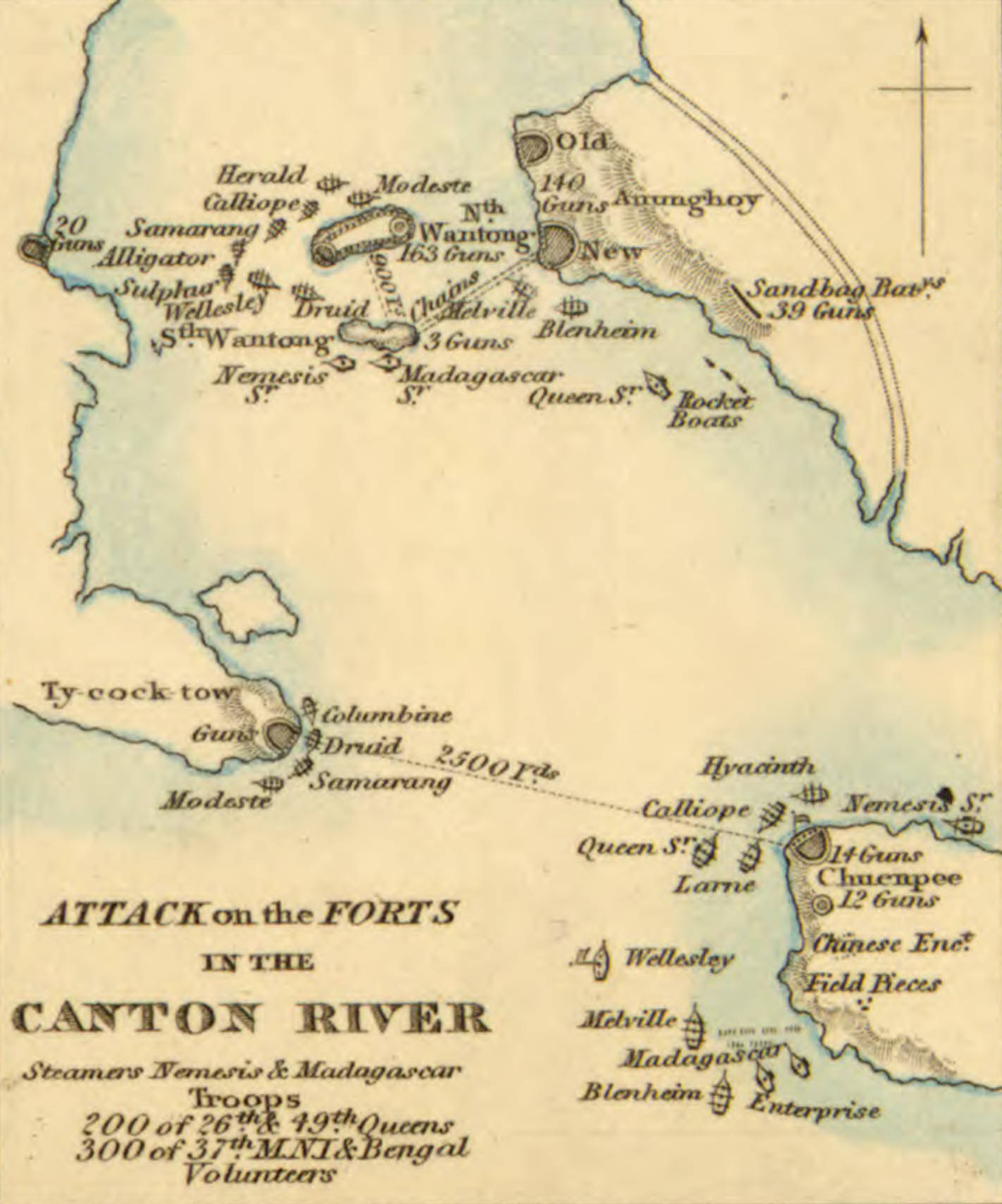
Contemporary map showing the Second Battle of Chuenpi (bottom) and the subsequent Battle of the Bogue (top)

On 8 January 1841 Smith commanded Druid in a force under Commodore Gordon Bremer at the Second Battle of Chuenpi. Simultaneous attacks were put in on the forts at Tycocktow and Chuenpi, which were on opposite peninsulas to each other, guarding the entrance to Canton. Druid was part of the squadron sent to attack Tycocktow. The ships anchored in succession around 200 yards out and silenced the fort's guns within a few minutes. The firing created a breach in the fort which was attacked by boats manned by the crews of the ships and quickly taken. Twenty-five cannons were destroyed and the casualties of the Chinese were suggested to be 'very severe'. Smith was praised by Bremer for his conduct during the attack.

Second Chuenpi secured an opening into Canton. In February a larger attack was put forth to attack it; Smith and Druid assisted in the preparations for the Battle of the Bogue by convoying the force's transports from Hong Kong. Druid arrived off Canton to join with Bremer's main force on 24 February, after the initial stages of the battle had already taken place to the west of Canton. At 11 a.m. on 25 February Smith took Druid in with a portion of Bremer's force to attack the Chinese batteries on the south, south-west, and north-west of the island of Wangtong, while also firing on the forts still active on the west bank of the river. The fire of the ships destroyed the batteries on Wangtong within the hour, allowing landing parties to attack and secure the location. Only the marines of Druid played a further part in the battle with Smith otherwise not employed; his service up to this point was again praised in the dispatches of his commanders.

In Druid Smith subsequently fought at the Battle of Canton on 18 March and Battle of Amoy on 26 August, in which encounters his conduct was again frequently praised by his commanders. At the latter battle Smith commanded the port division of the fleet, engaging the Chinese batteries at the entrance to Amoy, in order that the rest of the attack could go ahead securely. Smith stayed at Amoy after the battle to garrison it in September. There he repulsed threats of invasion from a nearby Chinese provincial governor, which included deliberating over the apparent capture of a native bride by British forces midway through her marriage and stopping attacks on the population of Amoy by other Chinese forces. He continued on the China Station in Druid until 1843 and was presented with gifts from the British merchant community in China for his 'valuable services as senior officer during a period of unexampled danger and difficulty'. Smith married Anna, the eldest daughter of Sylvester Costigin of Dublin, on 18 September 1844 in Berne, Switzerland, at the British Embassy.

=== Later service ===
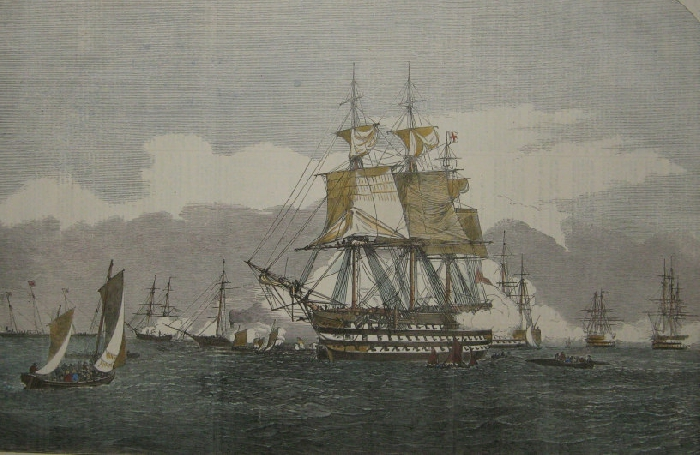
HMS Neptune in 1754

On 1 March 1848 Smith was given command of the ship of the line HMS Ganges at Sheerness in which he served in the Mediterranean for four years. While some time was spent at Portsmouth and Gibraltar, much of Smith's service in the Mediterranean was spent sailing from Malta and cruising the nearby coasts.

Smith briefly commanded the ship of the line HMS Neptune as guard ship at Portsmouth from 17 February 1854 to 7 March, on which latter day he was given command of the ship of the line HMS Prince Regent. Soon after, Prince Regent and Smith sailed for the Baltic to form part of the Royal Navy force fighting in the Crimean War. By 13 June Prince Regent was a part of the combined Franco-British fleet under Admiral Charles Napier fighting the Åland War but did not play a particularly active role in the campaign. Smith's part in the war was only brief, as Prince Regent was paid off at Portsmouth on 16 December.

Smith did not serve at sea again, and was promoted to rear-admiral on 3 July 1855, later becoming superintendent of the Royal Hospital Haslar and the Royal Clarence Yard. He was advanced to vice-admiral on 12 April 1862. On 30 November 1865 he was given one of the two flag officer's good service pensions, worth £150 a year. Smith was promoted to admiral on 12 September 1865, and subsequently retired from the navy in 1873. On 24 May he was nominated a Knight Commander of the Order of the Bath. Smith died on 18 January 1887 at his home in Florence at the age of 84.
