= Battle of the Barrier =

Coordinates: 22°12′53″N 113°32′56″E

- Part of the First Opium War
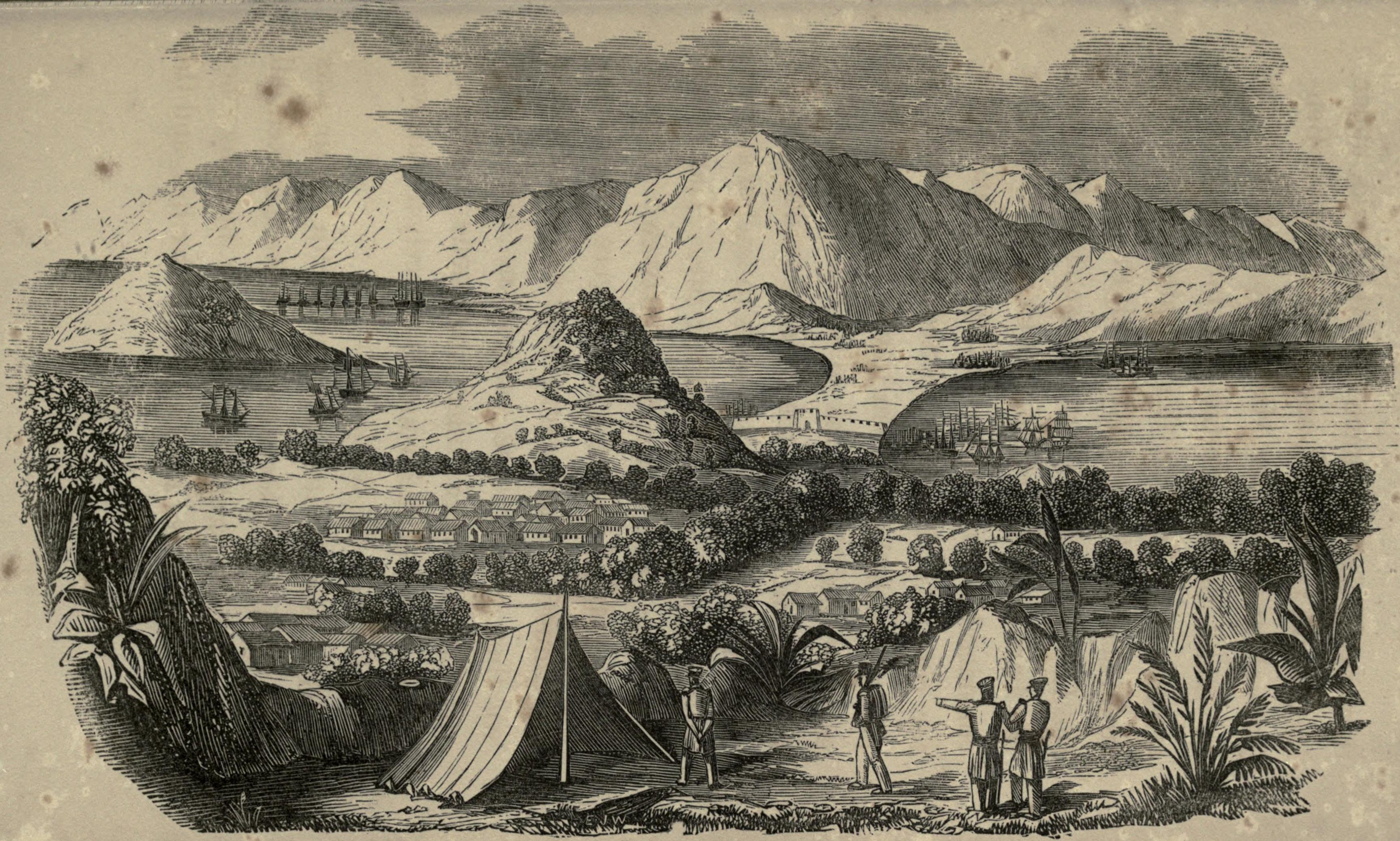
- View of the Barrier Gate on the isthmus connecting the Macao Peninsula to the mainland (published 1844)
Date	19 August 1840
Location	Macao, China
Result	British victory

Belligerents
United Kingdom: British East India Company	Qing China

Commanders and leaders
Henry Smith	Yi Zhongfu

Strength
2 sloops 1 frigate 1 steamer 1 transport ship 380 troops (land force)	2,000 troops 8 junks

Casualties and losses
4 wounded	50–60 killed 100–120 wounded

The Battle of the Barrier (Chinese: 澳門之戰) was fought between British and Chinese forces at the boundary separating Macao from mainland China on 19 August 1840 during the First Opium War. Located in modern-day Portas do Cerco, the Macao Peninsula was connected to Xiangshan Island by a narrow isthmus about 100 m (330 ft) wide and 1.2 km (0.75 mi) long. A wall called the Barrier was built across the isthmus in 1573, and it served as Macao's border.

== Background ==
On 6 August 1840, Chinese soldiers kidnapped Reverend Vincent Stanton while he was swimming at Casilha Bay in Macao, causing an uproar in the British community.

== Battle ==
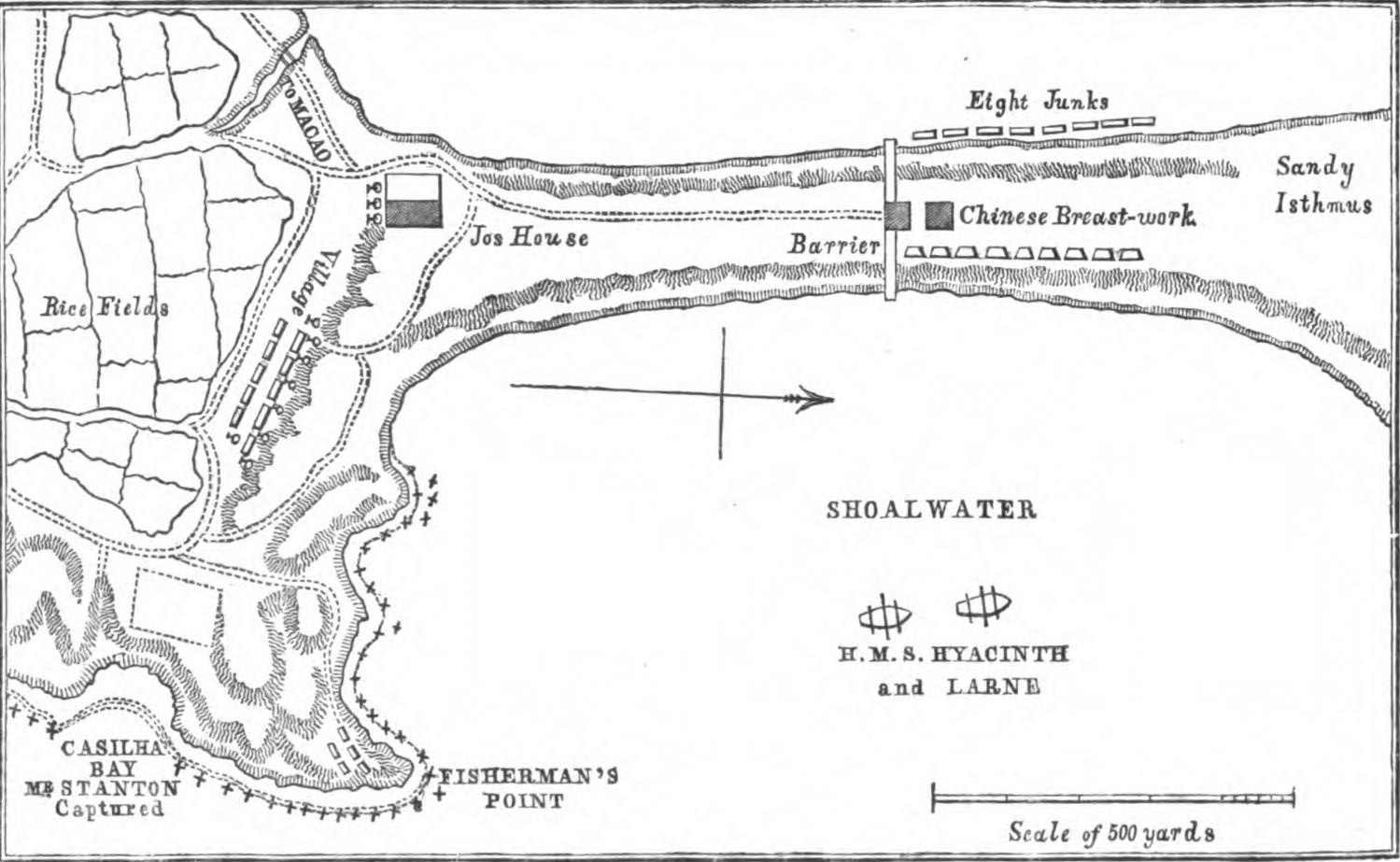
Map of the battle

On 18 August 1840, the steamer Enterprise, HMS Druid, and the transport ship Nazareth Shah, which had a detachment of Bengal Volunteers on board, arrived off Macao. The next morning, HMS Hyacinth and HMS Larne got underway towards the bay near the Barrier Gate. The Bengal Volunteers were embarked on board the Enterprise while nine boats filled with marines and seamen followed in the wake of the other ships. The Hyacinth and Larne, accompanied by the cutter Louisa and Enterprise, having seamen and marines of the Druid with Bengal Volunteers on board, attacked the barrier. These vessels stood in Fisherman's Bay, as close to the shore as the depth of water would allow. They opened fire on a 17-gun battery about 600 yards (550 m) away, which promptly returned fire. The cannonade lasted an hour, with over 600 shots fired.

The Chinese garrison at the Barrier Gate and surrounding area had 2,000 troops. Yi Zhongfu, the intendant of Gaolian circuit in Guangdong, was stationed in Macao with his troops. They advanced north from Macao while reinforcements advanced south from Beishan, with both groups reinforcing the Chinese flanks in the middle. The Portuguese were officially neutral and took no action during the engagement.

A British officer wrote: "The [Chinese] junks, which were aground in the inner harbour, were utterly useless, for none of their guns could be brought to bear, though several of the thirty-two pound shots of the ships found their way over the bank, much to the consternation of the occupants of the junks." In less than an hour, the batteries were silenced and the British forces were landed. It consisted of 110 marines under Lieutenant William Robert Maxwell, 90 seamen from the Druid under Lieutenant George Goldsmith, and 180 Bengal Volunteers, forming a 380-man brigade under Captain Mee of the latter corps. A field piece from the Druid was placed on the beach, raking the Chinese position. By 5:00 pm, the routing was complete, and the barracks and tents were set on fire. The British re-embarked late in the evening back to the Macao Roads, an anchorage east of Macao.

== Aftermath ==
After negotiations, Stanton was released from Canton by order of Commissioner Qishan on 12 December 1840. The Chinese restored their defences a year later when they built the Latashi fort, one kilometre north of the Barrier Gate. The Portuguese captured the fort in August 1849.
