= HMS Prince Regent (1823) =

Ship of the line of the Royal Navy

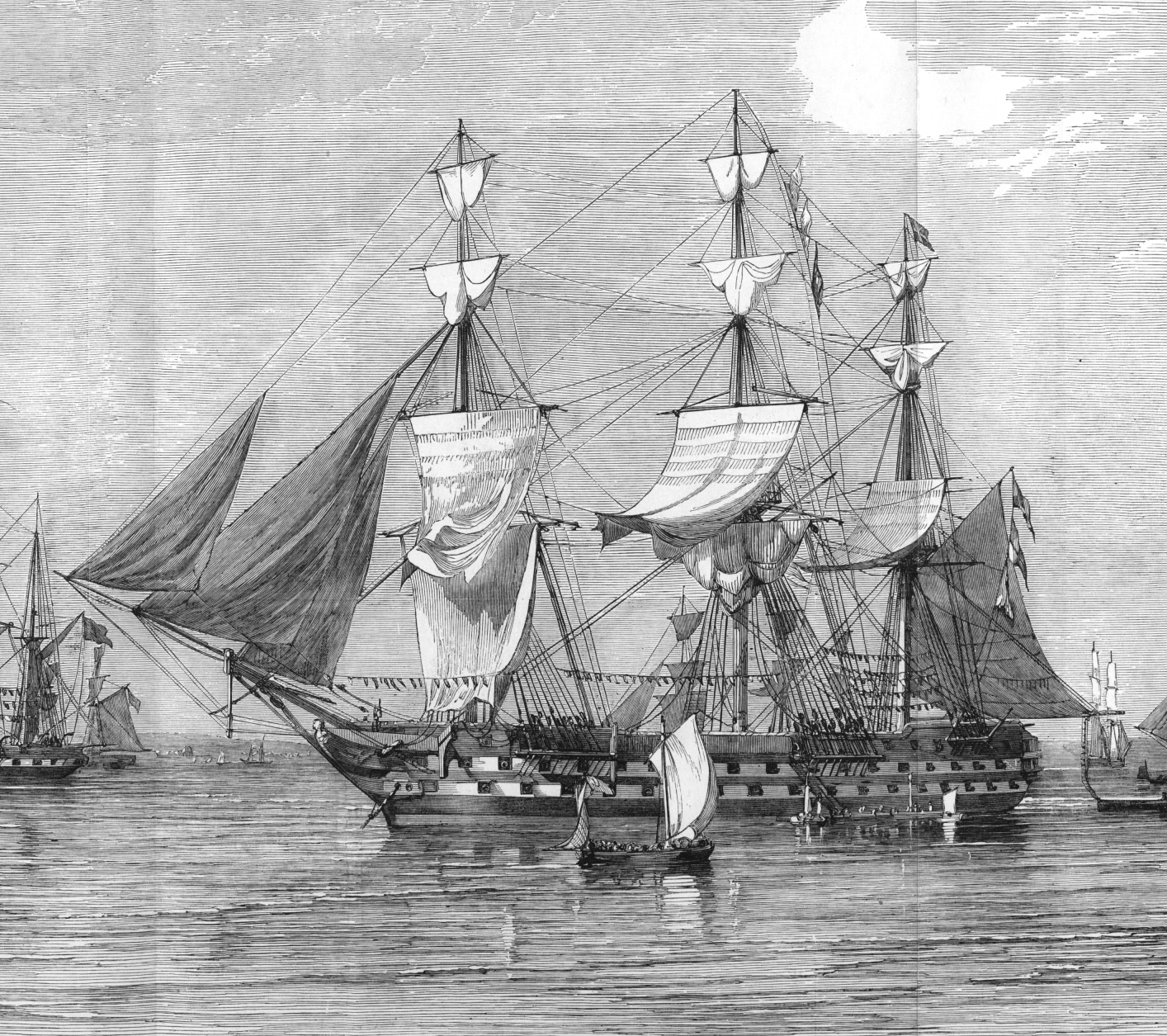
- Prince Regent at the Spithead Fleet Review on 15 July 1853

History

United Kingdom
- Name: Prince Regent
- Ordered: 6 January 1812
- Builder: HM Dockyard, Chatham
- Laid down: 17 July 1815
- Launched: 12 April 1823
- Completed: 3 September 1823
- Fate: Scrapping completed, 28 July 1873

General characteristics (as built)
- Class & type: Caledonia-class ship of the line
- Tons burthen: 2613 76/94 bm
- Length: 205 ft (62.5 m) (gun deck)
- Beam: 53 ft 7 in (16.3 m)
- Draught: 17 ft 6 in (5.3 m) (light)
- Depth of hold: 23 ft 2 in (7.1 m)
- Sail plan: Full-rigged ship
- Complement: 900 (wartime)
- Armament: 120 guns: Lower gundeck: 32 × 32 pdr guns; Middle gundeck: 34 × 24 pdr guns; Upper gundeck: 34 × 24 pdr Congreve guns; Quarterdeck: 6 × 12 pdr guns, 10 × 32 pdr carronades; Forecastle: 2 × 12 pdrs, 2 × 32 pdr carronades

General characteristics (after conversion to steam)
- Tons burthen: 2,762 (bm)
- Length: 217 ft 10 in (66 m) (gun deck)
- Installed power: Boilers
- Propulsion: 1 shaft; 1 single-expansion steam engine
- Complement: 830
- Armament: 89 guns; Lower gun deck: 32 × 8 in (203 mm) shell guns; Upper gun deck: 34 × 32 pdr guns; Forecastle & Quarterdeck: 22 × 32 pdr guns + 1 × 68 pdr gun

HMS Prince Regent was a three-deck, 120-gun, first rate, Caledonia-class ship of the line built for the Royal Navy (RN) between 1815 and 1823. She served as a guardship and flagship until 1832 when she was reduced to reserve, or "in ordinary" as the RN termed it. A notoriously bad sailer, the ship was razeed down to a two-deck, 92-gun second rate between 1844 and 1847 in the hope of improving her sailing performance. Prince Regent then served with the Mediterranean Fleet and the Western Squadron. The ship was assigned to the Baltic Fleet in 1854 during the Crimean War of 1854–1856 with the Russian Empire. Prince Regent was placed in ordinary at the end of 1854. The ship was converted to screw power in 1860–1861 and never went to sea before she was broken up in 1873.

== Description ==
The Caledonia class was an improved version of HMS Hibernia with additional freeboard to allow them to fight all their guns in heavy weather. Prince Regent measured 205 feet (62.5 m) on the gun deck and 171 feet (52.1 m) on the keel. She had a beam of 53 feet 7 inches (16.3 m), a depth of hold of 23 feet 2 inches (7.1 m), a light draught of 17 feet 6 inches (5.33 m) and had a tonnage of 2,613 76/94 tons burthen. Prince Regent had three masts and was ship rigged. Her crew numbered 820 officers and ratings in peacetime and 900 in wartime.

The ship was armed with 120 muzzle-loading, smoothbore guns that consisted of thirty-two 32-pounder (56 cwt) guns (Note: "Cwt" is the abbreviation for hundredweight, 56 cwt referring to the weight of the gun.) on her lower gun deck, thirty-four 24-pounder (49 cwt) guns on her middle gun deck and thirty-four 24-pounder Congreve guns on her upper gun deck. Her forecastle mounted a pair of 12-pounder guns and two 32-pounder carronades. On her quarterdeck she carried six 12-pounders and ten 32-pounder carronades.

=== Razeed ===
Prince Regent had proven to be very crank-sided and the Master Shipwright at Portsmouth prepared a cheap plan that was endorsed by the Admiral-Superintendent there, Vice-Admiral Hyde Parker, to improve her performance by cutting her down by a deck. This was approved by the Admiralty over the protests of the Surveyor of the Navy, William Symonds. He believed that the cause of the ship's problems was to be found below the waterline and disliked the loss of the concentrated firepower of a three decker. In effect, this made the ship a member of the smaller Rodney class with a reduced crew of 820 men. Her armament now consisted of twenty-six 32-pounders (56 cwt) and six 8 in (203 mm) shell guns on the lower gun deck and thirty 32-pounders (56 cwt) and six 8-inch shell guns on the upper deck. The number of guns on the forecastle and quarterdeck increased to twenty-six 42 cwt, 32-pounder guns.

=== Conversion ===
After the Crimean War, the naval arms race in screw-powered ships of the line between Britain and France resumed. In mid-1858 Captain Baldwin Wake Walker, Surveyor of the Navy, estimated that Britain would have 36 battleships to France's 40 by the end of 1859. He persuaded the Admiralty to authorize the cutting down and conversion of the 120-gun first rates of the Caledonia and Nelson classes into steam-powered second rates based on the successful conversion of the second rate London. Prince Regent was ordered to be converted to an 89-gun ship on 3 February 1860. She was lengthened to 217 feet 10 inches (66.4 m) at the gun deck and 180 feet 5 inches (55 m) at the keel. These changes modestly increased her tons burthen to 2,762. The ship was fitted with a two-cylinder, single-expansion steam engine of 500-nominal horsepower that was built by James Watt & Co. To reduce drag and improve performance under sail, the ship could hoist her propeller into the hull and retract the telescoping funnel.

The lower gun deck armament of the converted ships consisted of thirty-two 8-inch shell guns while the upper gun deck had thirty-four 32-pounders of 56 cwt. The combined armament of the forecastle and quarterdeck totalled twenty-two 32-pounders (42 cwt) and a single 68-pounder (95 cwt) pivot gun.

== Construction and career ==
Named after the title borne by George IV when he served as the regent during his father King George III's period of insanity, Prince Regent was the fourth ship of her name to serve in the RN. She was ordered on 6 January 1812, laid down at HM Dockyard, Chatham, on 17 July 1815 and launched on 12 April 1823. The ship was commissioned by Captain William Parry on 6 December 1822 and was completed on 3 September 1823 as a guardship and the flagship of the Commander-in-Chief, The Nore, Vice-Admiral Sir Benjamin Hallowell. By 19 December 1825, Captain Constantine Moorsom was in acting command of the ship which was serving as the flagship of Vice-Admiral Sir Robert Moorsom. On 24 July 1827 Captain George Poulett was commanding the ship which was the flagship of Vice Admiral Sir Henry Blackwood. Captain James Dundas assumed command of the ship on 6 August 1830. She became the flagship of Rear-Admiral Sir William Parker, the second-in-command of the Channel Squadron, in April 1831. The ship was detached from the squadron on 10 September and sent to the Lisbon Station to protect British citizens, during the Portuguese Civil War. En route, two men were killed during a gunnery exercise on 13 September. Parker hauled his flag down on 8 January 1832. Prince Regent was ordered home and was paid off the following month. She remained in ordinary until the Board of Admiralty decided that she was so crank-sided that she had to be cut down a deck and ordered her converted into a 92-gun second rate in March 1844. The work lasted until September 1847 and proved to be exceedingly expensive; enough so that further conversions of a similar nature were considered uneconomical.

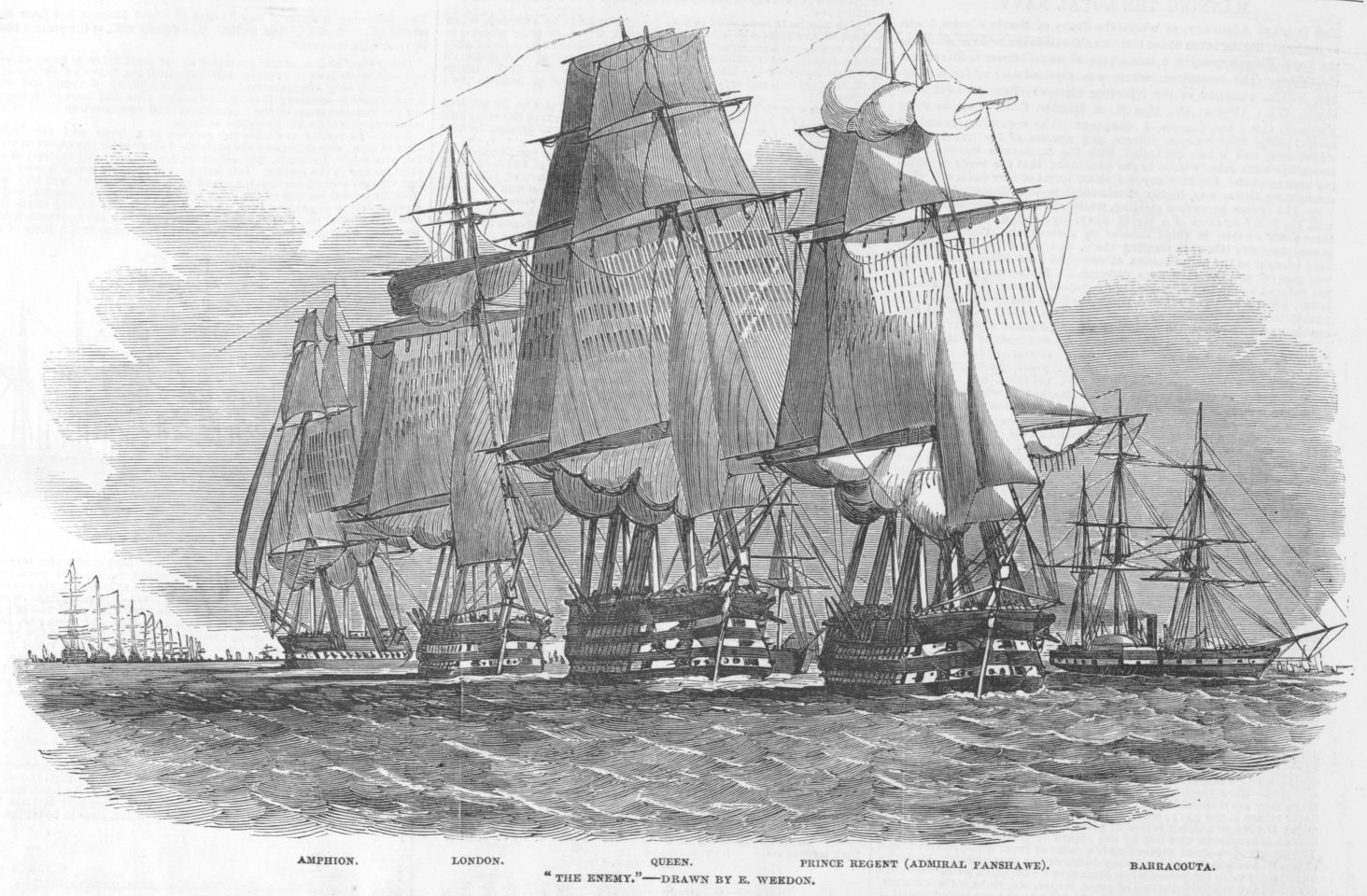
From left to right, Amphion, London, Queen, Prince Regent, and Barracouta; playing the part of the enemy squadron at Spithead in 1853 (after Edwin Weedon).

Prince Regent was recommissioned by Captain William Martin on 7 December 1847 for service with the Mediterranean Fleet. The ship was recommissioned on 7 December 1849 and Martin was promoted to commodore in command of the Lisbon Station, retaining Prince Regent as his flagship. Captain Robert Harris replaced Martin in command of the ship on 1 March 1851. He was relieved by Captain Frederick Hutton on 20 May 1852 and Prince Regent became the flagship of Rear-Admiral Armar Lowry Corry, commander of the Western Squadron, in 1852–1853. She participated in Queen Victoria's fleet review at Spithead on 11 August 1853.

The decisive Russian victory in the Battle of Sinop over the Ottoman Navy on 30 November alarmed politicians in both Britain and France. They decided to intervene on the side of the Ottomans and the British began forming a Baltic Fleet in February 1854 in anticipation of war. The Russians did not withdraw their forces in the Balkans as demanded by the British and French governments on 27 February and declarations of war by both governments followed a month later. Admiral Sir Charles Napier, commander-in-chief of the Baltic Fleet, was charged to blockade the exit from the Baltic Sea and all of the Russian ports therein. Hutton was replaced by Captain Henry Smith on 7 March 1854.

Prince Regent was assigned to the Baltic Fleet and was present when the French contribution to the Baltic Fleet rendezvoused with the British on 13 June. The ship is not known to have participated in any combat in 1854 and she was paid off on 16 December at HM Dockyard, Portsmouth, to release manpower for her sisters Neptune and St George. The conversion of the ship to steam power as an 89-gun, second rate was ordered on 3 February 1860 and work began at Portsmouth five days later. It was completed on 27 May 1861. Prince Regent never went to sea afterwards and her demolition was completed on 28 July 1873.
