= Battle of Chuenpi =

1839 battle of the First Opium War

Coordinates: 22.802°N 113.605°E

First Battle of Chuenpi
- Part of the First Opium War
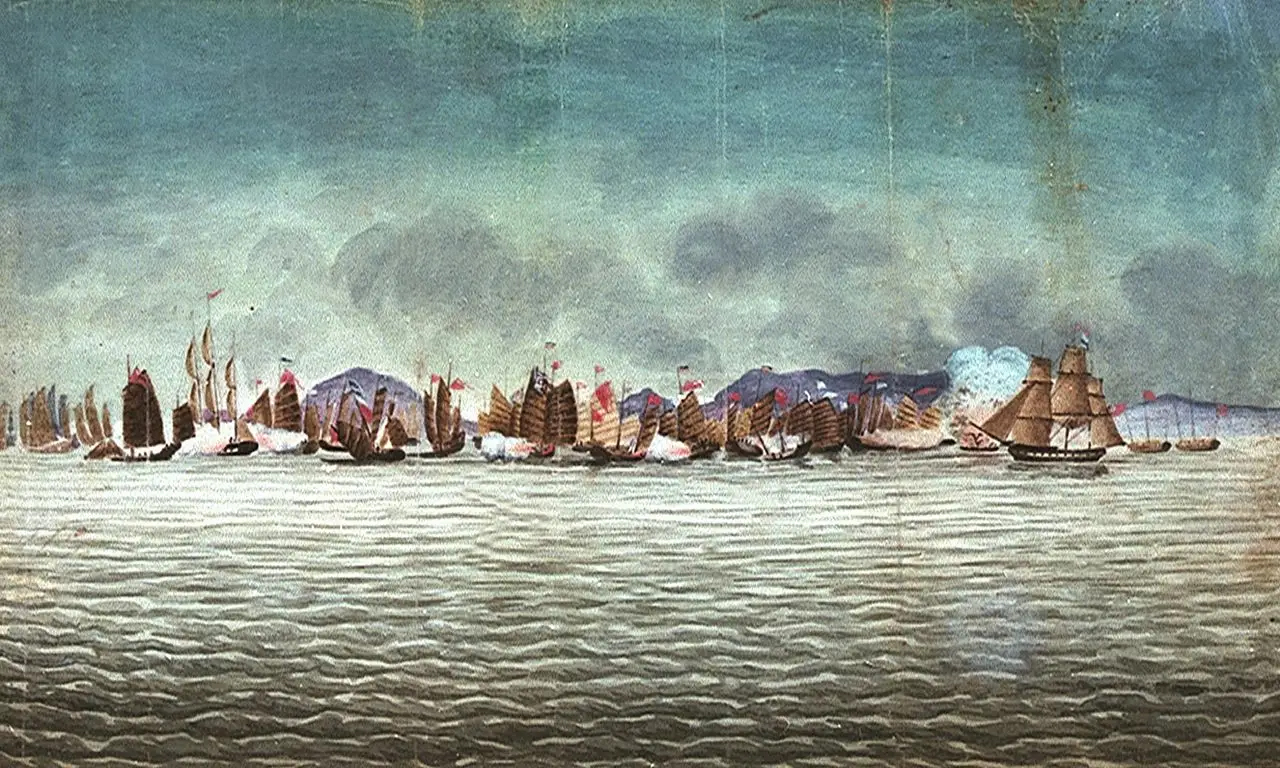
- The Volage and Hyacinth engaging Chinese war junks
Date	3 November 1839
Location	Humen, Guangdong, China
Result	British victory

Belligerents
United Kingdom: British East India Company	Qing China

Commanders and leaders
Charles Elliot; Henry Smith	Lin Zexu; Guan Tianpei

Strength
1 frigate 1 sloop	16 junks 13 fire rafts

Casualties and losses
1 wounded 1 Frigate lightly damaged 1 Sloop lightly damaged	15 killed 1 fire raft sunk 1 junk blown up 3 junks sunk several other junks damaged

The First Battle of Chuenpi (Chinese: 穿鼻之戰) was a relatively minor naval engagement fought between British and Chinese ships at the entrance of the Humen strait (Bogue), Guangdong province, China, on 3 November 1839 near the beginning of the First Opium War. The battle began when the British frigates HMS Hyacinth and HMS Volage opened fire on Chinese ships they perceived as being hostile.

It is named after Chuenpi island (also known as Chuanbi), one of two islands in Humen.

== Background ==
For foreign ships to be allowed to dock in Canton (Guangzhou) for trade, Chinese authorities required a signed bond agreeing not to trade opium. Captain Charles Elliot, Chief Superintendent of British Trade in China, ordered British ships not to sign the bond because if opium was found, the cargo would be confiscated and the perpetrators executed. This in turn interfered with the trade of British merchantmen in China. In October 1839 a cargo ship, the Thomas Coutts, under the command of captain Warner arrived in Canton from Singapore. The ship carried cotton from Bombay, and, since the captain was not trading opium, he defied Elliot's request and signed the Chinese bond. He held a legal view that Elliot's ban on the signing was not valid under English law.

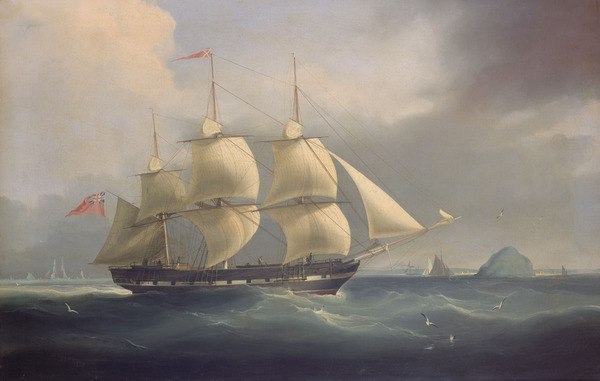
Thomas Coutts in 1836

Before Warner left China, Imperial Commissioner Lin Zexu gave him a letter addressed to Queen Victoria in which he disapproved the use of opium and requested the opium trade to stop. After arriving in London, he handed the letter to a co-owner of the Thomas Coutts, who asked for an appointment with Foreign Secretary Lord Palmerston. After Palmerston's office refused to see him, Warner forwarded the letter to The Times, which published it. Viewing Warner's defiance as a threat to his authority, Elliot ordered HMS Hyacinth and HMS Volage to be positioned 1 mile (1.6 km) south of the Chuenpi battery on 27 October to blockade any other British ships bound for Canton.

== Battle ==
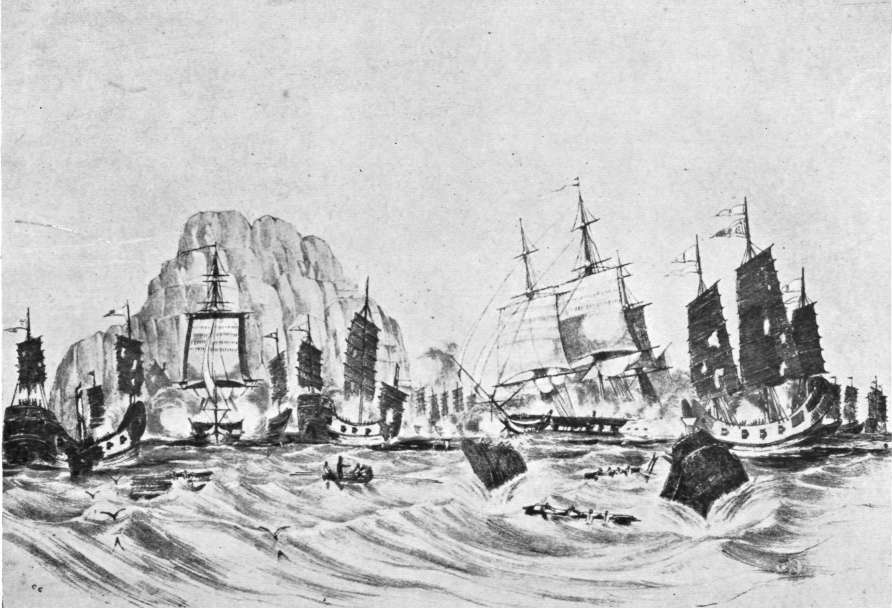
Volage and Hyacinth in Chuenpi

After a second British ship, Royal Saxon, tried to defy Elliot's blockade on 3 November 1839, Volage under Captain Henry Smith fired a warning shot across the Royal Saxon's bow. In response, Chinese war junks under Admiral Guan Tianpei moved out to protect Royal Saxon. After Elliot gave in to Smith's pressure for an attack, the more maneuverable British ships approached the Chinese vessels and fired broadsides at them from starboard.

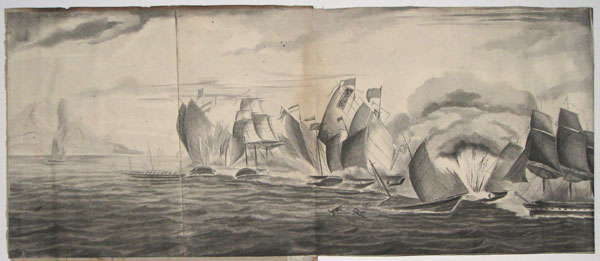
Depiction of the battle by Captain Peter William Hamilton

Smith wrote, "I did not conceive that it would be becoming the dignity of our flag, the safety of the merchant shipping below, and my own character, to retire before such an imposing force, sent out at that moment evidently for the purpose of intimidation." According to a Chinese account by Wei Yuan, "five of our war-ships went to preserve order on the sea-board" and "the English mistook our red flags for a declaration of war, and opened fire;—for in Europe a red flag means war, and a white one peace."

One Chinese fire raft immediately sank, and a war junk exploded after its magazine was struck. After the first run, the Volage and Hyacinth turned and repeated the same maneuver using their port broadsides. The stationary guns on the Chinese vessels could not be aimed effectively. One junk was blown up, three were sunk, and several others were damaged. Faced with superior firepower, the Chinese fleet sailed away except for Kuan's 12-cannon flagship, which returned fire. Since it posed a minimal threat, Elliot ordered Smith to stop firing, allowing the damaged flagship to sail off. The Volage sustained light damage on its sails and rigging, and the mizzen-mast of the Hyacinth was hit by a 12-pound (5.4 kg) ball. One British sailor was wounded and 15 Chinese were killed.

== Aftermath ==
The Royal Saxon sailed on to Canton and Elliot returned to Macau. Historian Bruce A. Elleman wrote, "the origin of this battle was not even between the British and the Chinese, but was really as a result of the British Navy fighting to stop one of Elliot's own British ships that had refused to uphold his free-trade principles. The 'Battle of Chuanbi,' perhaps more than any other conflict during the Opium War, vividly revealed the underlying free-trade tensions."
