= Battle of Kowloon =

First battle of the First Opium War

Coordinates: 22°17′34″N 114°10′14″E

- Part of the First Opium War
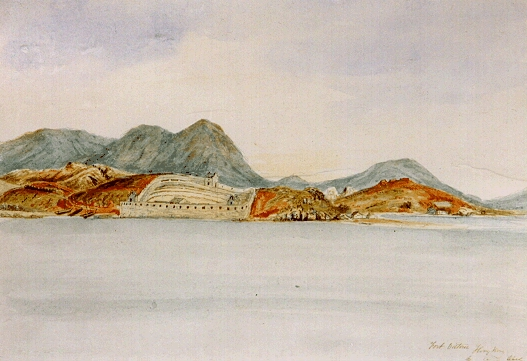
- The Chinese fort in Kowloon, 1841
| Date | 4 September 1839 |
| Location | Kowloon Peninsula, China |
| Result | Stalemate |

Belligerents
| United Kingdom | Qing China |

Commanders and leaders
| Charles Elliot; Henry Smith; Joseph Douglas (WIA) | Lai Enjue |

Strength
| 4 boats^{1} | 3 junks 1 fort |

Casualties and losses
| 3 wounded | 2 killed 6 wounded |
- ^{1} 1 cutter, 1 schooner, 1 pinnace, and 1 barge.

The Battle of Kowloon (Chinese: 九龍海戰) was a skirmish between British and Chinese vessels off the Kowloon Peninsula, China, on 4 September 1839, located in Hong Kong, although Kowloon was then part of Guangdong province. The skirmish was the first armed conflict of the First Opium War and occurred when British boats opened fire on Chinese war junks enforcing a food sales embargo on the British community. The ban was ordered after a Chinese man died in a brawl with drunk British sailors at Tsim Sha Tsui. The Chinese authorities did not consider the punishment that was meted out by British officials to be sufficient, so they suspended food supplies in an attempt to force the British to turn over the culprit.

Captain Charles Elliot was the chief superintendent of British trade in China, and he sailed to Kowloon in the cutter Louisa for food supplies during the embargo, accompanied by the schooner Pearl and a pinnace from HMS Volage. They encountered three Chinese junks, and Elliot sent interpreter Karl Gutzlaff with demands to allow the supply of provisions. He finally delivered an ultimatum after several hours of correspondence: the junks would be sunk if supplies were not received. The stated time period expired with no results, so the British opened fire on the junks, which returned fire with support from the on-shore fort. The larger junks pursued the British boats which were sailing away after running low on ammunition, but the British re-engaged the ships after replenishing their ammunition, and the Chinese retreated to their former position, ending the clash in a stalemate.

== Background ==
On 7 July, seamen from the Carnatic and Mangalore, both owned by Jardine, Matheson & Co., landed in Kowloon where they were joined by colleagues from other British and American ships. After a group of sailors consumed the rice liquor known as samshu, an innocent local named Lin Weixi (林維喜, Cantonese: Lam Wai-hei) in the village of Tsim Sha Tsui was beaten in a brawl by these drunken sailors and died the next day. On 15 July, Chief Superintendent of British Trade in China, Charles Elliot, offered rewards of $200 for evidence leading to the conviction of those responsible for the murder and $100 for evidence leading to the instigators of the riot. He also gave $1,500 in compensation to Lin's family, $400 to protect them against extortion of that money from what he called the "lower mandarins", and $100 to be distributed among the villagers.

Imperial Commissioner Lin Zexu demanded the handover of the culprit by the British authority, which was refused by Elliot. On 12 August, under an Act of Parliament of 1833, Elliot began a Court of Criminal and Admiralty Jurisdiction on board the Fort William in Hong Kong harbour, with himself as judge and a group of merchants as the jury. Two men were found guilty of rioting, fined £15 each, and sentenced to three months hard labour to be served in England while a further three men were found guilty of assault and rioting, fined £25 each, and sentenced to six months imprisonment in similar conditions. However, the Act was under review and after arriving in England, they were set free on the grounds that the trial held no jurisdiction. Elliot invited Lin to send observers to the trial, but none came. Without the handover of a man to the Chinese, Lin was not satisfied with the proceedings. He viewed the extraterritorial court as an infringement of China's sovereignty.

On 15 August, Lin issued an edict that prevented the sale of food to the British. Chinese labourers working for the British in Macao were withdrawn the next day. War junks arrived in coves along the Pearl River and notices above the fresh water springs warned that they were poisoned. On 24 August, the Portuguese Governor of Macao, Adriao Accacio da Silveira Pinto, announced that the Chinese had ordered him to expel the British from the colony. He warned Lancelot Dent of the British hong Dent & Co. that the Chinese planned to seize the British dwellings in Macao. On 25 August, former Superintendent John Astell proposed to Elliot that all British boats should evacuate to Hong Kong. By the end of the month, 2,000 people in over 60 ships were in Hong Kong harbour without fresh food or water. The ships held European merchants, lascars, and dozens of British families. The 28-gun frigate Volage of Captain Henry Smith sailed to Hong Kong on 30 August. Smith was an old friend of Elliot from their service in the West Indies Station. Elliot warned Kowloon officials that there was bound to be trouble if the embargo continued against the merchant fleet.

== Battle ==
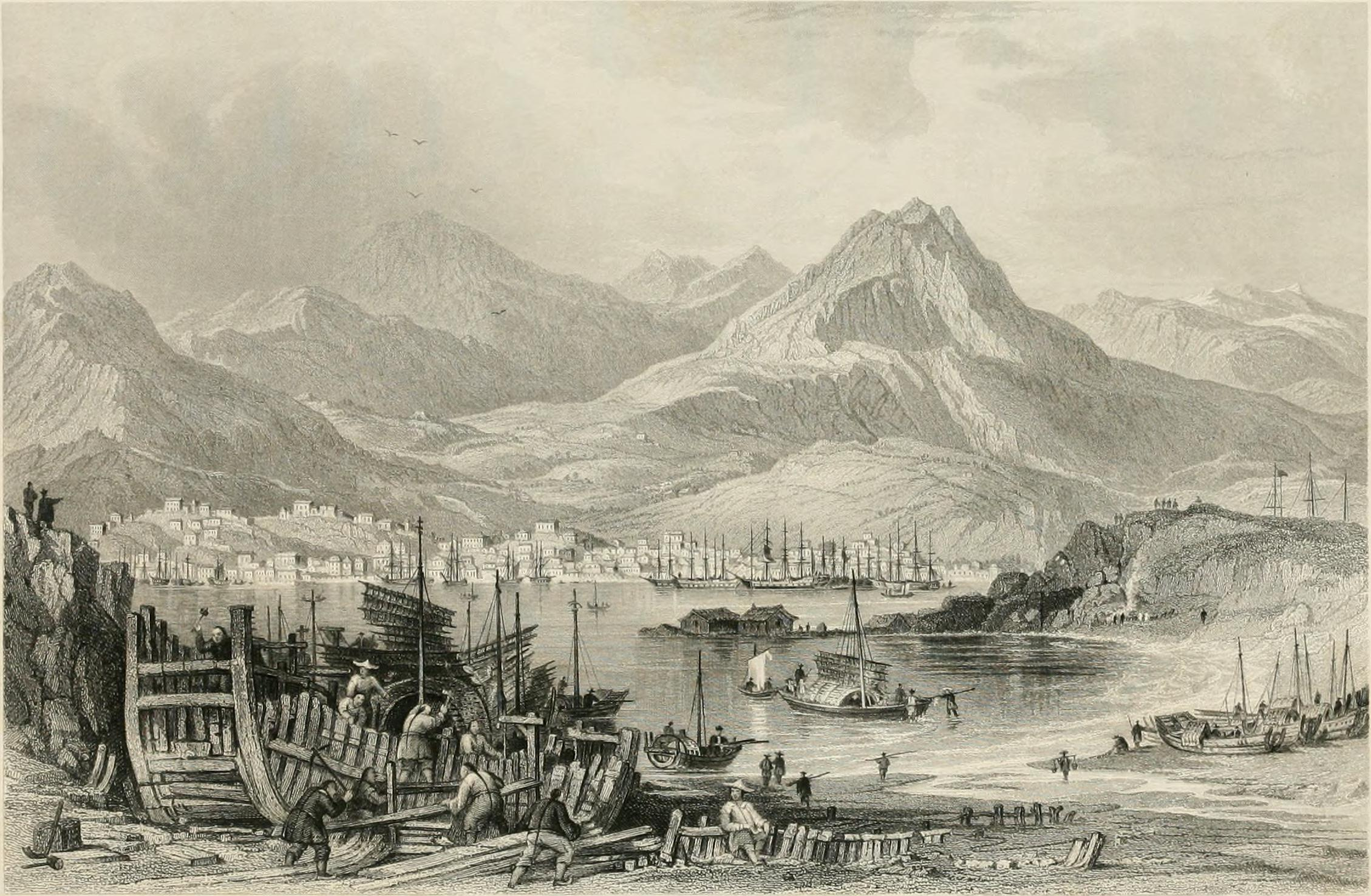
View of Hong Kong Island from Kowloon, c. 1841

On 4 September, Elliot sailed to Kowloon in the 14-gun cutter Louisa for food supplies, accompanied by the 6-gun schooner Pearl, and a 1-gun pinnace from the Volage of Captain Smith. Upon arrival, they encountered three anchored Chinese men-of-war junks, whose presence prevented the regular supplies of food. Elliot sent interpreter Karl Gutzlaff in a small boat with two men to the centremost junk, which Elliot thought was the commanding vessel due to its size and superior equipment. Gutzlaff took two documents that he translated from Elliot. They included demands for food shipments to be restored and a plea not to repeat the poisoning of the colony's water springs. After a Chinese spokesman read the messages, he told Gutzlaff that they lacked the authority to renew food sales but was willing to report the matter to his superiors. Gutzlaff responded, "Suppose you were without food for any length of time, and debarred from buying it, would you wait until the case was transmitted to the higher authorities, or procure for yourself the same by every means in your power?" to which they exclaimed, "Certainly nobody will like to starve, and necessity has no law." They then directed him to another junk where a naval officer was said to reside. The local Chinese commander was Lieutenant-Colonel Lai Enjue.

There, Gutzlaff restated his request to allow people to come out and sell provisions. He repeatedly went back and forth between the two parties, repeating details of the conversations with Elliot. He also took £200 and told the Chinese that they would not leave without supplies. Soon afterwards, the Chinese soldiers went off in a boat to consult with the officer in the adjacent fort and promised to relay his opinion; it appeared nothing could be done unless the matter was reported to the deputy of the commissioner, who resided in the neighbourhood, and leave obtained from the plenipotentiary himself. After a Chinese request to know the items wanted, Gutzlaff wrote a list. He was told they could not be procured but items would be given to satisfy immediate necessities. According to Gutzlaff, this was "a mere manoeuvre" to gain time in manning the fort. He reported, "After the most pathetic appeal to their feelings, and having described the disasters which certainly would ensue from their obstinacy, I left them, and returned on board the cutter".

After five or six hours of what Elliot called "delay and irritating evasion", he sent a boatload of people on shore to a distant part of the bay with money to purchase provisions, which they accomplished, but were then obliged by mandarin authorities to return them. In his report, Elliot wrote that he felt "greatly provoked" upon hearing this and opened fire on the junks in what became the first armed conflict of the First Opium War. According to Adam Elmslie, a young Superintendency clerk who was present, Elliot sent a message at 2 pm, warning the Chinese that if they did not receive provisions in half an hour, they would sink the junks. When the ultimatum expired with no results, Smith ordered his pinnace to fire, after which Elmslie observed:

The Junks then triced up their Boarding nettings, and came into action with us at half pistol shot; our guns were well served with grape and round shot; the first shot we gave them they opened a tremendous and well directed fire upon us, from all their Guns (each Junk had 10 Guns, and they brought all these over on the side which we engaged them on) ... The Junk's fire, Thank God! was not enough depressed, or ... none would have lived to tell the Story.—19 of their Guns we received in [the] mainsail,—the first Broadside I can assure you was not pleasant.

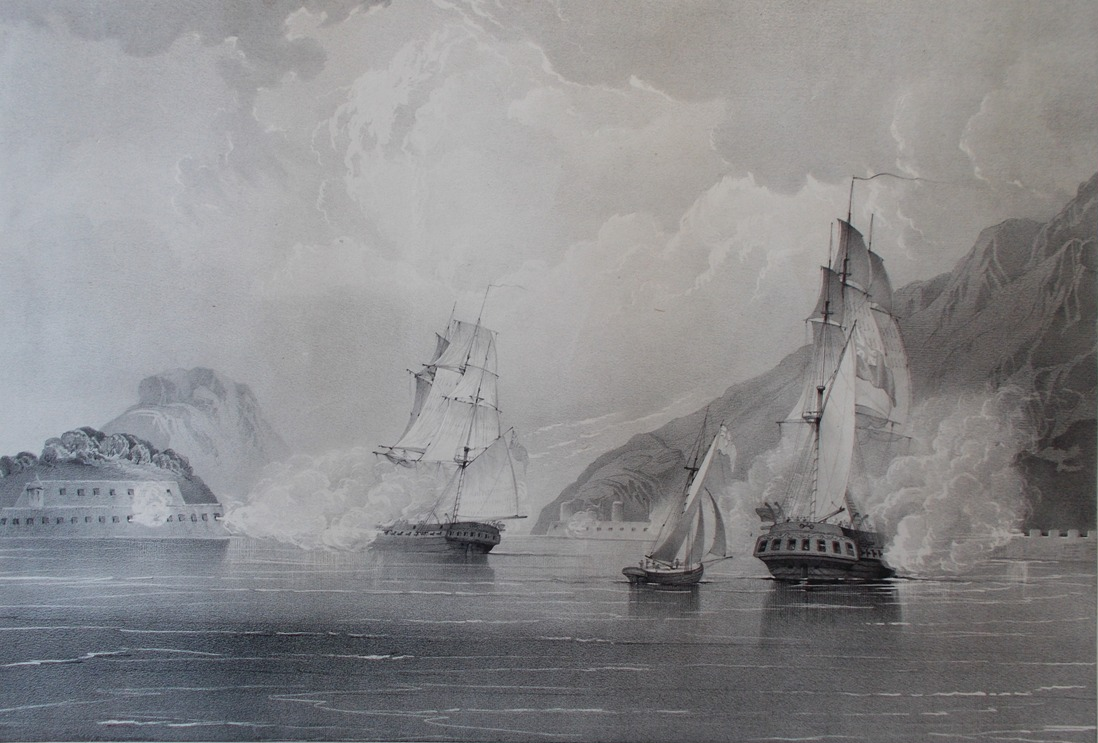
The cutter Louisa (centre) in 1834

At 3:45 pm, the shore batteries opened fire in support of the junks. By 4:30 pm, the Louisa had fired 104 rounds. Running low on ammunition, the British sailed away, with the pinnace having gone for help. The junks pursued the retreating vessels; the Pearl was half the size of the junks and the Louisa a quarter of the size. After replenishing their cartridges, both boats re-engaged the junks, which the clerk described:

The junks immediately made sail after the Louisa and at 4:45 [pm] they came up with the English vessels. We hove the vessel in stays on their starboard Beam, and the 'Pearl' on the larboard [portside] Bow of the van Junk, and gave them three such Broadsides that it made every Rope in the vessel grin again.—We loaded with Grape the fourth time, and gave them gun for gun.—The shrieking on board was dreadful, but it did not frighten me; this is the very first day I ever shed human blood, and I hope it will be the last.

Meanwhile, British reinforcements were arriving, including the barge from the East Indiaman Cambridge commanded by Captain Joseph Abraham Douglas and manned by 18 seamen. During the re-engagement, the junks retreated to their former positions. The battle ended in a stalemate. The Volage later arrived and weighed with the armed boats of the fleet, but night came and put an end to the engagement. The next morning, the junks were evacuated and with the mandarins offering "no molestation", Elliot did not carry the conflict further. In total, three British were wounded; a flesh wound in the arm of Douglas, and two of his crew more severely. Lin reported two Chinese killed and six wounded.

== Aftermath ==
During the evening, Elliot and Smith discussed destroying the three junks and deploying men to attack the battery the next day, but Smith acceded to Elliot's recommendation not to do so. Elliot stated that an attack would destroy the village and cause "great injury and irritation" to the inhabitants. In a letter to trader James Matheson on 5 September, Elliot felt that it would be unbecoming of a British warship to shoot to death the Chinese junks, which his "poor Cutter" could do under their batteries. He wrote: "Perhaps I ought not to have fired at all but every man's patience has limits and mine has been sorely tried. I am afraid I have disappointed the men's ardent spirits here but I believe I have done well to refrain." He circulated a paper on shore the same day which stated:

The men of the English nation desire nothing but peace; but they cannot submit to be poisoned and starved. The Imperial cruisers they have no wish to molest or impede; but they must not prevent the people from selling. To deprive men of food is the act only of the unfriendly and hostile.

American sea captain Robert Bennet Forbes described the event in a letter to his wife a day after the clash:

Hearing the firing I took a small fast pulling [rowing] gig and went round a point of land with my long spy glass to see the fun, while many ships sent their armed boats, & the frigate got underway to protect them, it was quite a farce – I kept a mile off not intending to mix up in this quarrel.

The British were able to obtain provisions after the skirmish but they were slightly more expensive. English sinologist Arthur Waley theorised that given the corruption of the Canton Navy, Chinese patrol boats tried to obtain bribes from the peasants by offering to turn a blind eye on their trading activities during the embargo. Since the bribes were larger than they were willing to pay, the embargo was enforced and the British were cut from the supplies. But after the battle, the Chinese were disinclined to risk another naval confrontation and accepted a smaller bribe from the peasants, resulting in food supplies being available again but at a slightly higher price. The Chinese commander Lai sent a disingenuous report of victory, claiming to have sunk a two-masted English ship and inflicted at least 40 or 50 casualties. This is the first of what Chinese accounts later called the "Six Smashing Blows" against the British navy. However, these accounts were fabricated and the official misreporting of events was repeated throughout the war.

To understand why the Chinese made such reports, Waley explained that any military action, whether successful or not, was followed by a scramble to get mentioned in the official report to the throne as an incentive for receiving a decoration, promotion, or other reward. The number of alleged casualties inflicted on the enemy was often based on what officers thought would entitle them to the reward they had in mind. Although Lin forwarded Lai's concocted reports to the Daoguang Emperor, Waley noted that it is unclear to what extent, if any, that Lin was aware of the fabrications, especially since he was regarded as a man of unusually high integrity by the British and Chinese. This was the first in a series of reports in which the emperor became aware in 1841 that the Canton authorities had been systematically deceiving him about events during the war. The emperor ordered the Governor of Guangxi, Liang Jiangju (梁章鉅), to send him clear accounts of the events at Canton, noting that since Guangxi was a neighbouring province, Liang must be receiving independent accounts. He warned Liang that he would be able to verify his information by secret inquiries from other places.
