= Guan Tianpei =

Chinese admiral of the Qing dynasty

Fafulingga Baturu Guan Tianpei
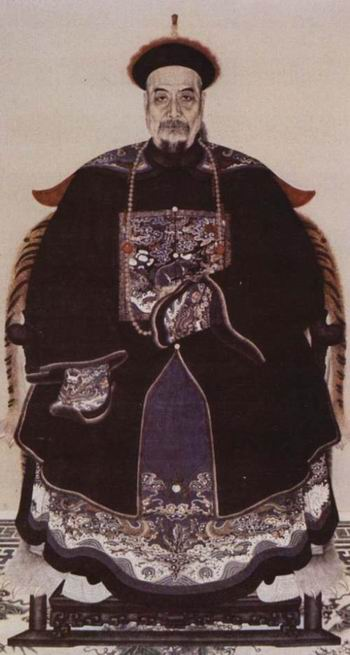

Commander-in-Chief of Guangdong Naval Forces
- In office 1834–1841
- Preceded by: Li Zengjie
- Succeeded by: Dou Zhenbiao

Personal details
- Born: 1781 Shanyang County, Jiangsu, Qing China (present-day Huai'an)
- Died: February 26, 1841 (aged 59–60) Humen, Guangdong, Qing China †
- Courtesy name: Zhongyin (仲因)
- Art name: Zipu (滋圃)
- Posthumous name: Zhongjie (忠節)

Military service
- Allegiance: Qing Dynasty
- Branch/service: Guangdong Naval Forces
- Rank: Admiral
- Battles/wars: First Opium War: Second Battle of Chuenpi; Battle of Chuenpi; Battle of the Bogue †

Guan Tianpei (simplified Chinese: 关天培; traditional Chinese: 關天培; Wade–Giles: Kuan^{1} T'ien^{1}-p'ei^{2}; 1781 – 26 February 1841), (Note: Referred to in contemporary British sources as Admiral or General Kwan) courtesy name Zhongyin (仲因), art name Zipu (滋圃), was a Chinese admiral of the Qing dynasty who served in the First Opium War. His Chinese title was "Commander-in-Chief of Naval Forces". In 1838, he established courteous relations with British Rear-Admiral Frederick Maitland. Guan fought in the First Battle of Chuenpi (1839), the Second Battle of Chuenpi (1841), and the Battle of the Bogue (1841).

The British account described his death in the Anunghoy forts during the Battle of the Bogue on 26 February 1841 as follows:

Among these [Chinese officers], the most distinguished and lamented was poor old Admiral Kwan, whose death excited much sympathy throughout the force; he fell by a bayonet wound in his breast, as he was meeting his enemy at the gate of Anunghoy, yielding up his brave spirit willingly to a soldier's death, when his life could only be preserved with the certainty of degradation. He was altogether a fine specimen of a gallant soldier, unwilling to yield when summoned to surrender because to yield would imply treason.

The following day, his body was claimed by his family and a salute of minute-guns was fired from HMS Blenheim in his honor.

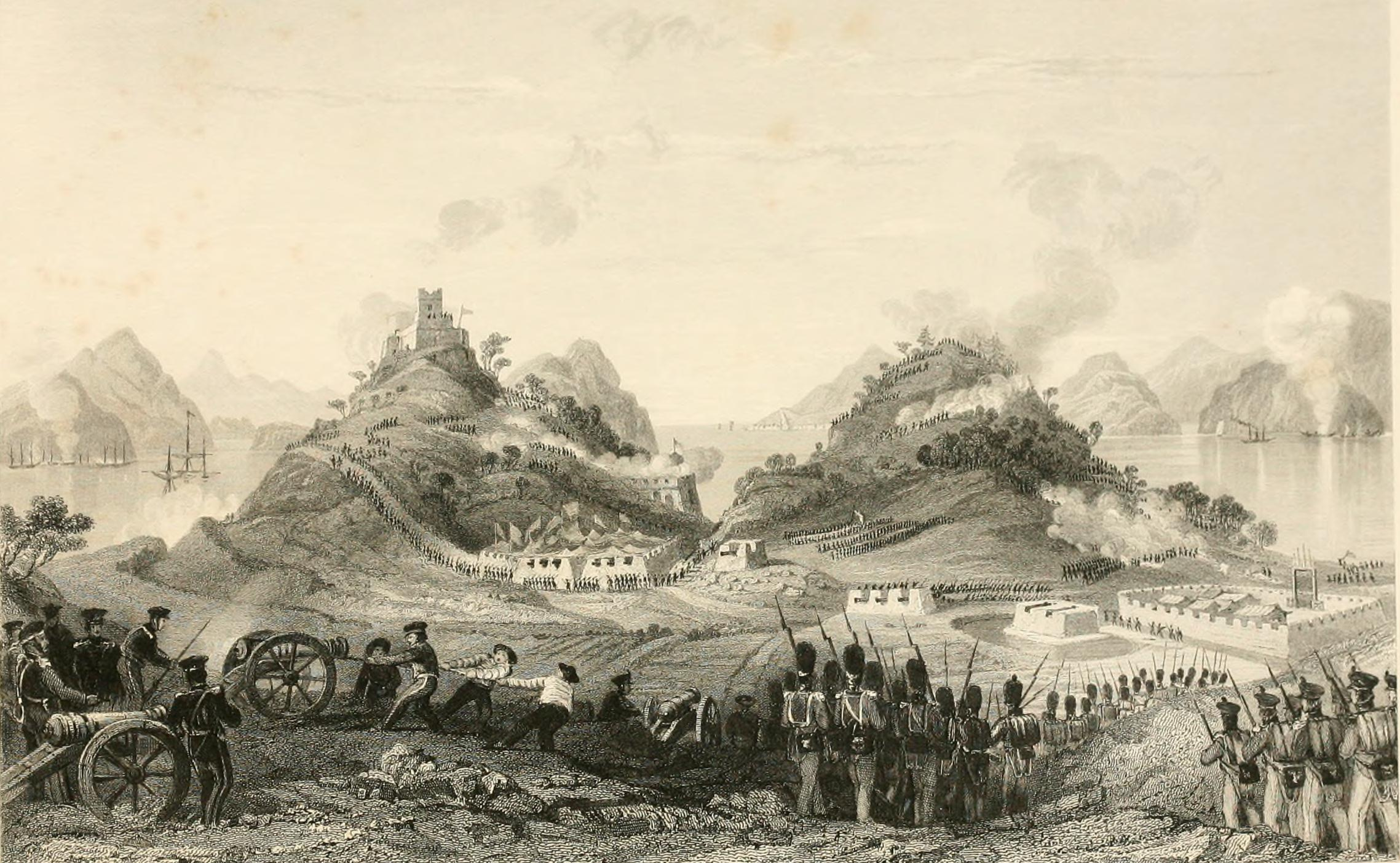
Battle Of Chuenpi

== Early life ==
Guan Tianpei was born in 1781 in Shanyang county (now Huai'an city) in Jiangsu province. His courtesy name is Zhongyin (仲因). In the eighth year of the Emperor Jiaqing (1803), he passed the imperial examination for military service, and he was successively assigned to the Bazong (把总), Qianzong (千总), Shoubei (守备), Youji (游击), Canjiang (参将) and vice general (参将), and these were the military ranking system during the Qing dynasty. In the sixth year of the Emperor Daoguang (1826), he was assigned to the vice-general of the Taihu camp for naval of Qing in Jiangsu province. In 1827, Guan was assigned to the army officer in Susong county in Jiangnan. In the thirteenth year of the Emperor Daoguang (1833), Guan was assigned to the military commander of the Jiangnan area.

== Anti-Opium Movement ==
In the fourteenth year of the Emperor Daoguang (1834), Guan was assigned to the navy commander of the southern Guangdong province. When he arrived at Guangdong, he devoted himself to strengthen the coastal defense affairs. In the nineteenth year of the Emperor Daoguang (1839), Lin Zexu was assigned to imperial commissioner to prohibit the use of opium in Guangzhou. When Lin arrived, Guan was influenced by Lin. Guan mobilized his navy to coordinate with Lin to prohibit the Opium trade. They captured about 20,000 chests of opium from the British merchants.

== Battle Between the Qing and the British Forces ==
In 1839, British warships attacked Qing navy in Chuenpi, Guan Tianpei commanded his navy and fought back, British warships were heavily inflicted by Guan's navy. In the twentieth year of the Emperor Daoguang (1840), Lin Zexu was dismissed by the Emperor Daoguang to quench British wrath. Qishan replaced Lin's position. Qi gave orders to remove Guan's coastal defence affairs by reducing the number of navy soldiers, and this gave the British forces the chance to invade. Many Guangdong local government officials hoped to make peace with the British forces. But Guan Tianpei was not swayed, and he was preparing to fight the British forces. Before the battle started, he dispatched a soldier to take his old clothes and tooth back to his hometown to give to his relatives.

In January 1841, British forces captured Shajiao (沙角) and Dajiao fort (大角炮台). Thus, Weiyuan Fort lost the protective screen. Guan Tianpei was defending with a few soldiers on the front line. Guan requested Qishan to reinforce, but Qi did not send an army to support Guan. Guan used his money for army food supplement, and he encouraged his soldier to fight the British forces.

On 26 February, British forces massively attacked Humen. Guan led 400 soldiers to counterattack and attempt to repel British offence. Several forts were captured by the British force. A soldier asked Guan to retreat, but Guan refused and kept fighting. Guan gave his commander seal to a soldier and asked him to take it back to the emperor. A shell fired and hit Guan. Guan died along with 400 soldiers.
