= Battle of the Bogue =

Battle during the First Opium War

Coordinates: 22°47′55″N 113°37′15″E

- Part of the First Opium War
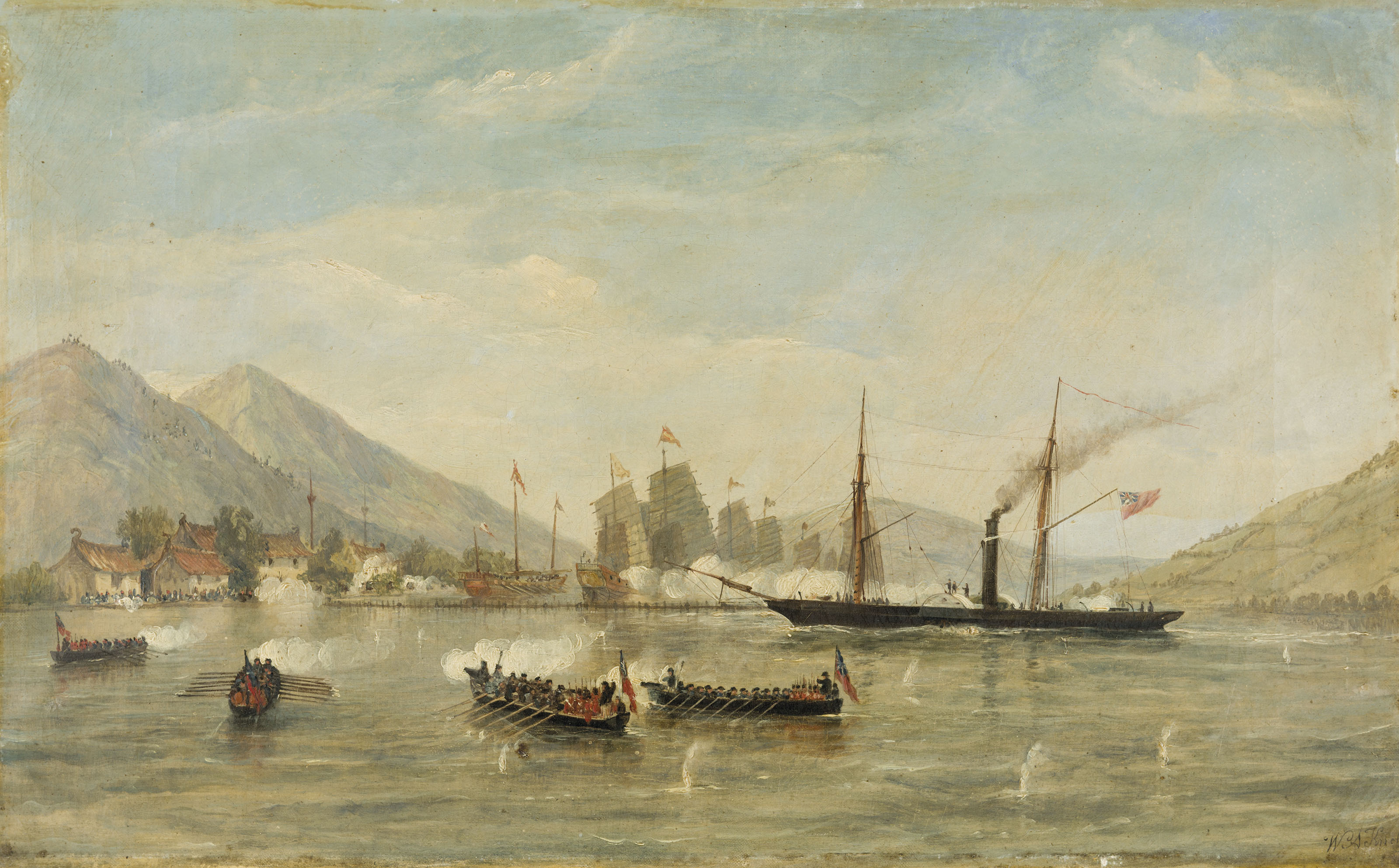
- The Nemesis attacking a masked battery and war junks behind Anunghoy Island on 23 February 1841
| Date | 23–26 February 1841 |
| Location | Humen, Guangdong, China |
| Result | British victory |

Belligerents
| United Kingdom: British East India Company | Qing China |

Commanders and leaders
| Gordon Bremer; Charles Elliot | Guan Tianpei †; Qishan |

Strength
| 12 ships 1,037 men 3 guns^{1} | 30 junks 2,000 men^{1} 506+ guns 3 forts |

Casualties and losses
| 5 wounded | 500+ killed or wounded 506 guns captured 3 forts captured |
- ^{1} In North Wangtong only.

The Battle of the Bogue (Chinese: 虎門之戰) was fought between British and Chinese forces in the Pearl River Delta, Guangdong province, China, on 23–26 February 1841 during the First Opium War. The British launched an amphibious attack at the Humen strait (Bogue), capturing the forts on the islands of Anunghoy and North Wangtong. This allowed the fleet to proceed further up the Pearl River towards the city of Canton (Guangzhou), which they captured the following month.

== Background ==
After the Second Battle of Chuenpi on 7 January 1841, British Plenipotentiary Charles Elliot and Chinese Imperial Commissioner Qishan negotiated the Convention of Chuenpi on 20 January; a condition of which was that the port of Canton (Guangzhou) was to be opened for trade on 2 February. However, no proclamation for the opening of the port appeared. On 11–12 February, Elliot and Qishan met again at the Bogue. Elliot acceded to a further delay (not to exceed ten days) for the treaty to be fairly prepared. Commodore Gordon Bremer, commander-in-chief of British forces, wrote in his dispatch:

I must confess that from this moment my faith in the sincerity of the Chinese Commissioner was completely destroyed, my doubts were also strengthened by the reports of the Officers I sent up to the place of meeting, who stated that military works on a great scale were in progress, troops collected on the heights, and camps protected by entrenchments, arising on both sides of the river, and that the island of North Wangtong had become a mass of cannon.

Suspecting warlike intentions on the part of the Chinese, Bremer sailed to the Macao Roads (an anchorage east of Macao) on 13 February to confer with Elliot. He found that the Nemesis was en route to Canton to demand ratification of the convention and had orders to wait until the night of 18 February for an answer. On the morning of 19 February, the Nemesis returned without a reply, and all doubt regarding the hostile intentions of the Chinese ended when the ship came under fire from North Wangtong. Later that evening, Qishan's and Elliot's intermediary Paoupang arrived in Macao in a chop-boat, announcing Qishan's refusal to sign the treaty and demanding ten more days to consider it. However, Elliot replied that fair means have been exhausted. Bremer detached the Calliope, Samarang, Herald, Alligator, Modeste, and Sulphur under Captain Thomas Herbert to prevent further defensive preparations. In response, a proclamation from the Lieutenant-Governor of Canton, Eleang, announced a $30,000 reward for the heads of Bremer or Elliot, and $50,000 for anyone who could seize them alive, among other rewards.

== Battle ==
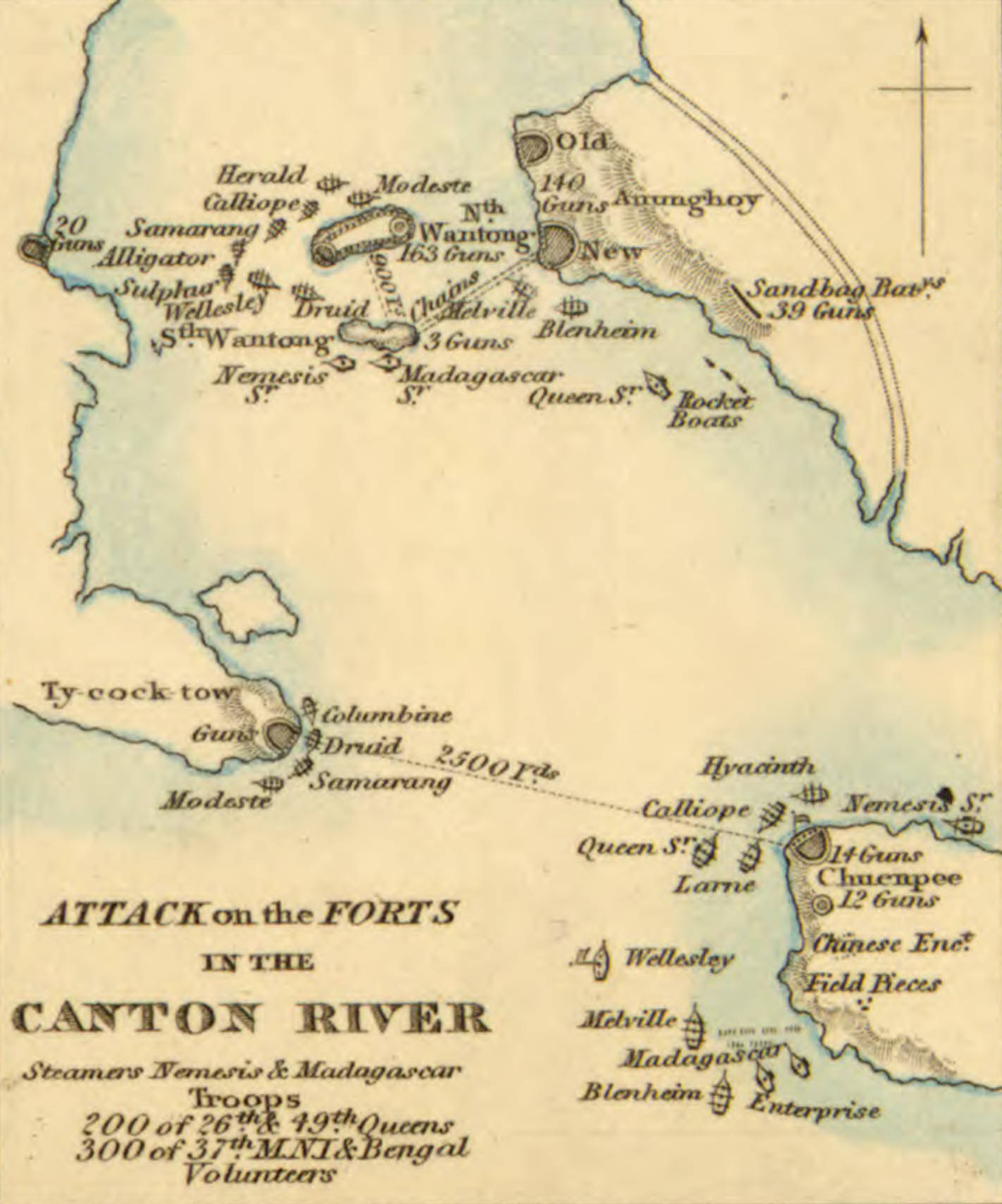
Map of the battle, showing Anunghoy and the Wangtong Islands

On 23 February, Captain Herbert, accompanied by Elliot, sailed to the rear passage of Anunghoy Island aboard the Nemesis, with the pinnaces of the Calliope, Samarang, Herald, and Alligator in flotilla. As the fleet tried to clear the stakes placed across the river, they unexpectedly encountered a masked 20-gun battery almost abreast of the spot, which immediately opened fire. The Nemesis responded with a volley of grape and canister shots from the bow and stern guns, while the pinnaces sailed towards the shore to storm the battery, opening fire from their bow guns as they advanced. Herbert reported that 30 small Chinese junks and boats were "making off in the greatest confusion; our return fire was rapid and so energetically followed up by landing and pushing on to the attack, that the fort ... was immediately in our possession." The Chinese fled after a slight resistance, whereupon their magazines, a few junks, and some boats were burned. The British disabled the 20 mounted guns of various calibre by breaking the trunnions. An additional 60 dismounted guns were found and rendered useless, excluding a few brass ones which were taken as trophies. There were no British casualties. Herbert reported 20 to 30 Chinese dead. On the same day, former Imperial Commissioner Lin Zexu wrote in his diary: "I hear that two small steamers belonging to the English rebels, with several small boats, sailed straight up to T'ai-p'ing-hsü [behind Anson's Bay] in the Bogue, opened fire and set alight a number of peasants' houses, and also the Customs House."

Since South Wangtong Island was unfortified by the Chinese, the British set up a battery there to target the forts on North Wangtong Island, which would also divert attention from the upcoming attack on Anunghoy. Shortly after midday on 25 February, the Nemesis embarked 130 troops of the 37th Madras Native Infantry (MNI) to assist in erecting a mortar battery on the island. In the evening, Captain W. J. Birdwood of the Madras Sappers and fellow engineer officers, with a working party of Royal and Madras Artillery, covered by the 37th MNI, erected a sand bag battery on a saddle in the middle of the island. Two 8-inch iron and one 24-pounder brass howitzer were put in position. During construction, the North Wangtong batteries fired during much of the night but their shots passed mostly above the site and slackened towards 2:00 am. At daylight on 26 February, the three howitzers fired shells and rockets into North Wangtong and occasionally into Anunghoy. British troops were ordered to be ready at 7:00 am, but due to calm weather, the operation was delayed until 11:00 am, when the breeze was strong enough to sail.

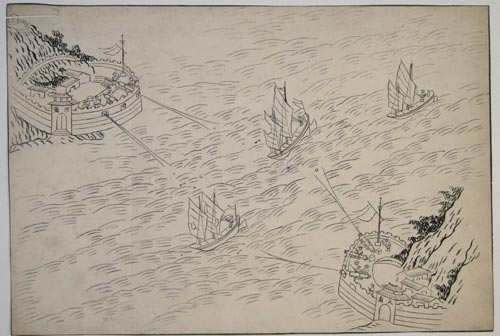
Chinese drawing of the Anunghoy forts, found in the house of Guan, representing the expected attack of the British

Anunghoy's defences were the 42-gun South Anunghoy Fort (Weiyuan), the 60-gun Jingyuan Fort north of Weiyuan, and the 40-gun North Anunghoy Fort (Zhenyuan). Captain Humphrey Fleming Senhouse of the Blenheim—aided by the Melville, the steamer Queen, and four rocket boats—approached the southern fort, dropped its anchor 600 yards (550 m) away, and fired broadsides from its starboard guns. The Melville approached five minutes later off the portside of the Blenheim, sailed within 400 yards (370 m) of the fort, and fired broadsides in quick succession. A British officer wrote: "The firing of these ships was most splendid: nothing could withstand their deadly aim ... One or two shot were sufficient for the 'dragon-hearted' defenders of the north fort, who, 'letting' off their guns, fled up the hills." At 1:20 pm, after bombarding and silencing the forts, Senhouse landed on the southern battery with about 300 Royal Marines and bluejackets (sailors) carrying small arms to clear out the few remaining defenders. The same was done to the other two batteries. By 1:30 pm, the forts were captured. Chinese Admiral Guan Tianpei was among the estimated 250 killed or wounded in Anunghoy. After his family identified his body the next day, the Blenheim fired a minute-gun salute in his honour as his body was taken away. A Chinese bell that Senhouse captured was later sent to England and donated to St Mary's Church in Gosforth by his widow in 1844.

North Wangtong's defences were the Wangtong Fort (Hengdang) on the eastern side and the 40-gun Yong'an Fort on the western side, flanked by a field work of 17 guns. A boom connected South Wangtong to the South Anunghoy Fort, where it was heaved or lowered by a windlass. It was composed of four parts of a chain cable supported by large wooden rafts. A passage was not forced through it until after the forts were taken. The Wellesley (Commodore Bremer's flagship) and Druid targeted the southwest batteries, while the light division under Captain Hebert—comprising the Calliope, Samarang, Herald, Alligator, Modeste, and Sulphur—targeted the northwest and southeast batteries of the island, which had 2,000 Chinese defenders. In less than an hour, the batteries were silenced. At 1:30 pm, under Major Thomas Simson Pratt, 1,037 troops from the 26th and 49th regiments, 37th MNI, Bengal Volunteers, and Royal Marines landed on the rear of the southwest fort from the steamers Nemesis and Madagascar. Within minutes, the British captured the island and 1,300 Chinese surrendered. An estimated 250 Chinese were killed or wounded in Wangtong and 167 guns were captured. In total, five British were wounded and 339 artillery pieces were captured that day. Lin wrote in his records: "I got home at the Hour of the Monkey [3 p.m.] ... and when night came heard that the Bogue forts and those on Wantung Island were being invested, preparatory to attack, by the English rebels. I at once went with Deng to Qishan's office and at the Hour of the Rat [11 p.m.] we heard that the Wantung, Yung-an and Kung-ku forts have fallen. All night I could not sleep."
