= HMS Volage (1825) =

British sailing frigate (1825–1874)

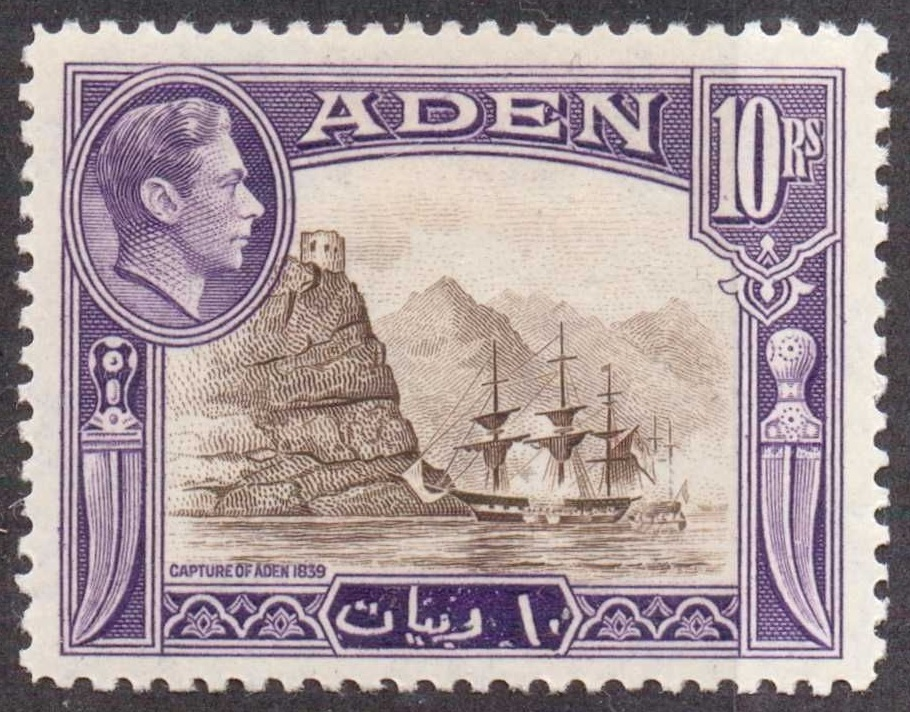
- HMS Volage depicted on a stamp commemorating the Aden Expedition

History

United Kingdom
- Name: Volage
- Builder: Portsmouth Dockyard
- Launched: 19 February 1825
- In service: 1825-1864
- Refit: 1847
- Stricken: 1864
- Honours and awards: Aden 1839, Baltic 1855
- Fate: Broken up 12 December 1864

General characteristics
- Tons burthen: 516 (bm)
- Length: 111ft
- Decks: Two
- Crew: 178
- Armament: 28 guns

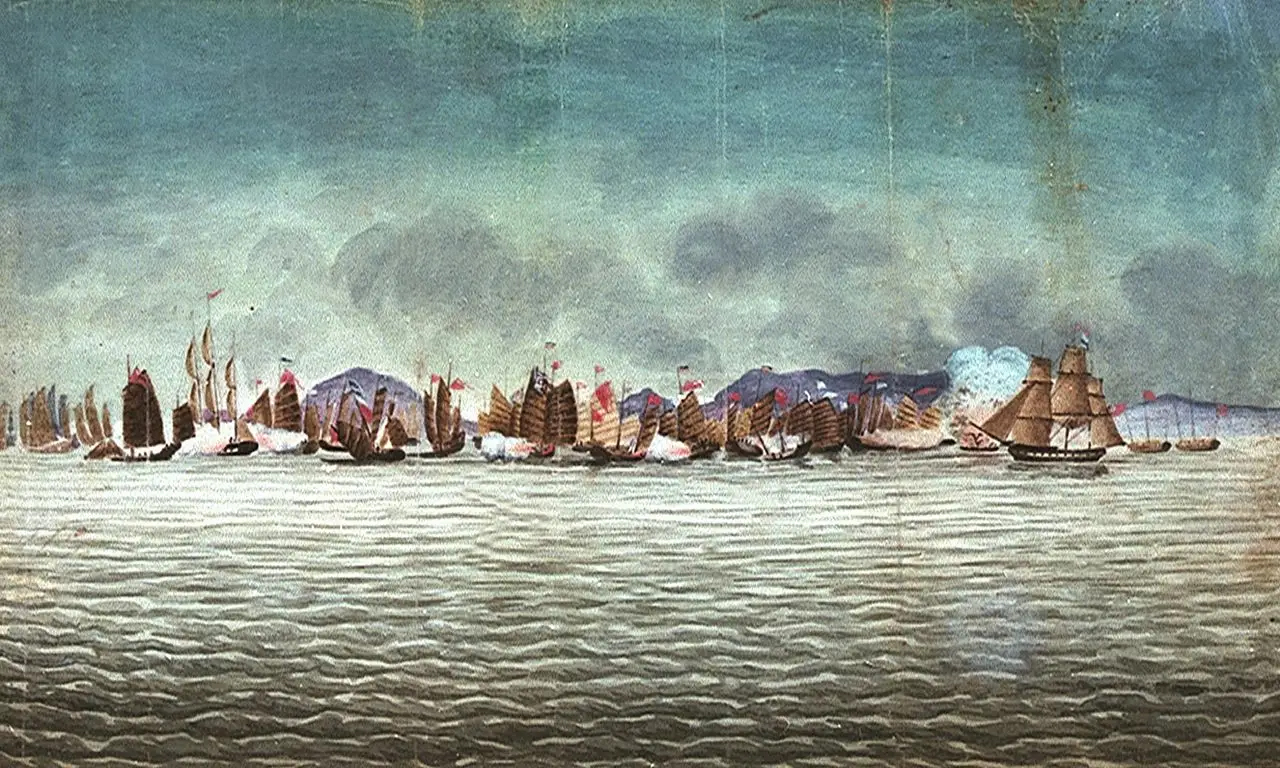
HMS Volage and HMS Hyacinth engage Chinese Junks in the Battle of Chuenpee.

HMS Volage was a sixth-rate sailing frigate launched in 1825 for the Royal Navy. At one point geologist Thomas Abel Brimage Spratt served aboard her.

== Construction ==
Volage was a one-off 28-gun sixth-rate frigate designed and built by the "superior class of Portsmouth shipwright apprentices". She was ordered on 16 June 1819 as a successor to the Atholl-class corvettes, the last batch of which were ordered only eleven days before Volage herself. She was laid down in August and launched on 20 February 1825 with the following dimensions: 113 feet 10 inches (34.7 m) along the gun deck, 95 feet 7 3/4 inches (29.2 m) at the keel, with a beam of 32 feet 2 inches (9.8 m) and a depth in the hold of 8 feet 9 inches (2.7 m). She measured 515 51/94 tons burthen. The fitting out process for Volage was completed on 26 January 1826.

== Service ==
Volage served as the lead ship in the Aden Expedition due to her being the largest and best armed of the ships assembled.

In 1831, Volage was docked in Rio de Janeiro (at the time capital of the Empire of Brazil) alongside HMS Warspite. Volage was the vessel that took Emperor Pedro I, who had just abdicated the Brazilian throne, to Portugal, in order to face his brother King Miguel in the context of the ongoing Portuguese Civil War of 1828–1834.

Volage fought in the Battle of Chuenpi during the First Opium War under the command of Captain Henry Smith. In 1847 she was converted into a survey ship, being commanded by Thomas Graves among others. Volage was deployed to the Baltic during the Crimean War.

Volage was converted into a powder barge at Sheerness Dockyard in March–June 1855, but was recommissioned for service as a storeship for the Baltic later that year. She was loaned to the War Department as a powder depot in the River Medway on 19 October 1864 and was briefly returned to Admiralty control on 10 February 1871 before being loaned as a floating depot for gun cotton at Upnor on 19 September. Scrapping of the ship was completed at Chatham Dockyard on 12 December 1874.
