= HMS Neptune (1832) =

Ship of the line of the Royal Navy

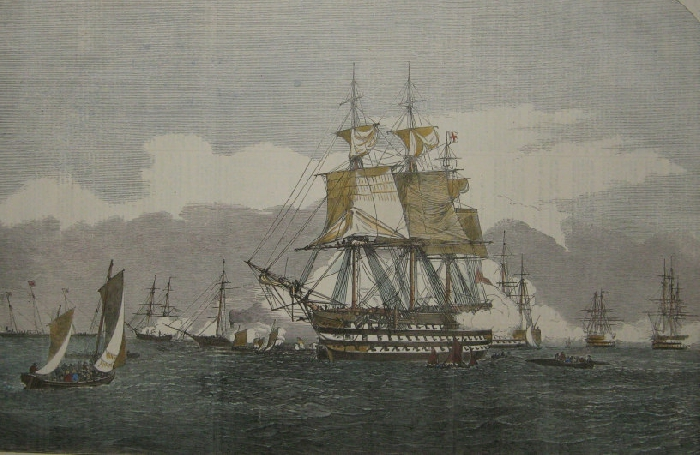
- Neptune portrayed in the Illustrated London News, 1854

History

United Kingdom
- Name: Neptune
- Namesake: Neptune
- Ordered: 12 February 1823
- Builder: Portsmouth Dockyard
- Laid down: January 1827
- Launched: 22 September 1832
- Commissioned: 5 December 1851
- Fate: Sold for scrap, 23 January 1875

General characteristics (as built)
- Class & type: Broadened Caledonia-class ship of the line
- Tons burthen: 2,705 75/94 bm
- Length: 205 ft 8 in (62.7 m) (gun deck)
- Beam: 55 ft 7 in (16.9 m)
- Draught: 18 ft 4 in (5.6 m) (light)
- Depth of hold: 23 ft 2 in (7.06 m)
- Propulsion: Sails
- Sail plan: Full-rigged ship
- Complement: 900 (wartime)
- Armament: 120 muzzle-loading, smoothbore guns: Gun deck: 30 × 32 pdrs, 2 × 68 pdr carronades; Middle gun deck: 32 × 32 pdrs, 2 × 68 pdr carronades; Upper gun deck: 32 × 32 pdrs, 2 × 68 pdr carronades; Quarterdeck: 16 × 32 pdr carronades; Forecastle: 2 × 32 pdrs, 2 × 32 pdr carronades

General characteristics (after conversion)
- Displacement: 3,405 long tons (3,460 t)
- Tons burthen: 2,830 (bm)
- Length: 216 ft 6 in (66 m) (gun deck)
- Installed power: Boilers; 1,910 ihp (1,420 kW)
- Propulsion: 1 shaft; 1 single-expansion steam engine
- Speed: 11.3 knots (20.9 km/h; 13.0 mph)
- Complement: 830
- Armament: 89 guns; Lower gun deck: 32 × 8 in (203 mm) shell guns; Upper gun deck: 34 × 32 pdr guns; Forecastle & Quarterdeck: 22 × 32 pdr guns + 1 × 68 pdr gun

HMS Neptune was a 120-gun, three-deck, first rate, broadened Caledonia-class ship of the line built for the Royal Navy during the 1830s. Completed in 1832, the ship remained in ordinary until 1854 when she was commissioned to serve as a flagship with the Baltic Fleet during the Crimean War of 1854–1856. She was razeed and converted into a screw-powered, two-deck, 89-gun, second rate in 1858–1859. Neptune served with the Mediterranean Fleet until she was paid off at the end of 1862. The ship was sold for scrap in 1875.

== Description ==
The Caledonia class was an improved version of HMS Hibernia with additional freeboard to allow them to fight all their guns in heavy weather. The broadened sub-class had their beam increased to improve their stability. Neptune measured 205 feet 8 inches (62.7 m) on the gun deck and 170 feet 6 inches (52.0 m) on the keel. She had a beam of 55 feet 7 inches (16.9 m), a depth of hold of 23 feet 3 inches (7.1 m), a light draught of 18 feet 4 inches (5.59 m) and had a tonnage of 2,705 75/94 tons burthen. Her crew numbered 820 officers and ratings in peacetime and 900 in wartime. Neptune had three masts and was ship rigged.

The ship was armed with 120 muzzle-loading, smoothbore guns that consisted of thirty 32-pounder (56 cwt) guns (Note: "Cwt" is the abbreviation for hundredweight, 56 cwt referring to the weight of the gun.) and two 8 in (203 mm) shell guns on her lower gun deck, thirty-two 32-pounder (55 cwt) guns and two 8-inch shell guns on her middle gun deck and thirty-four 32-pounders on her upper gun deck. Her forecastle and quarterdeck carried a total of six 32-pounders and fourteen short 32-pounder guns between them.

=== Conversion ===
After the Crimean War, the naval arms race in screw-powered ships of the line between Britain and France resumed. In mid-1858 Captain Baldwin Wake Walker, Surveyor of the Navy, estimated that Britain would have 36 battleships to France's 40 by the end of 1859. He persuaded the Admiralty to authorize the cutting down and conversion of the 120-gun first rates of the Caledonia and Nelson classes into steam-powered second rates based on the successful conversion of the second rate London. Neptune was ordered to be converted in mid-1858. She was lengthened at the stern to 216 feet 6 inches (66 m) at the gun deck and 179 feet 1 inch (54.6 m) at the keel. These changes modestly increased her tons burthen to 2,830 and gave her a displacement of 3,405 long tons (3,460 t). The ship was fitted with a two-cylinder single-expansion steam engine of 500-nominal horsepower that was built by Ravenhill, Selkeld & Co. that gave the ship a speed of 11.2 knots (20.7 km/h; 12.9 mph) during her sea trials at Stokes Bay on 18 June 1859 from 1,910 indicated horsepower (1,420 kW), although her masts and stores were not yet fitted. To reduce drag and improve performance under sail, the ship could hoist her propeller into the hull and retract the telescoping funnel.

The lower gun deck armament of the converted ships consisted of thirty-two 8-inch shell guns while the upper gun deck had thirty-four 32-pounders of 56 cwt. The combined armament of the forecastle and quarterdeck totalled twenty-two 32-pounders (42 cwt) and a single 68-pounder (95 cwt) pivot gun.

== Construction and career ==
Named for the Roman god of the sea, Neptune was the fourth ship of her name to serve in the RN. She was ordered on 12 February 1823, laid down at Portsmouth Dockyard in January 1827, launched on 27 August 1832 and completed in December. The ship remained in ordinary until she was commissioned on 5 December 1851 as a guard ship in ordinary by Captain Richard Yates. Captain Edward H. Scott assumed command on 27 March 1852.

The decisive Russian victory in the Battle of Sinop over the Ottoman Navy on 30 November alarmed politicians in both Britain and France. They decided to intervene on the side of the Ottomans and the British began forming a Baltic Fleet in February 1854 in anticipation of war. The Russians did not withdraw their forces in the Balkans as demanded by the British and French governments on 27 February and declarations of war by both governments followed a month later. Admiral Sir Charles Napier, commander-in-chief of the Baltic Fleet, was charged to blockade the exit from the Baltic Sea and all of the Russian ports therein. His second in command was Rear Admiral Armar Corry.

Scott was relieved in his turn by Captain Henry Smith on 17 February. Neptune became Corry's flagship with Captain Frederick Hutton replacing Smith on 7 March. Accompanied by two other sailing battleships, Corry joined Napier's main body in late March and was present when the French contribution to the Baltic Fleet rendezvoused with the British on 13 June. The ship is not known to have participated in any of the minor actions in 1854 and she did not return to the Baltic in 1855 as she was only awarded the Baltic 1854 battle honour. Neptune was paid off on 5 January 1856.

Walker ordered that the ship be cut down one deck and converted to screw propulsion on 10 August 1858 and work began that same day. She was undocked on 7 March 1859, commissioned by Captain William Hoste on 7 June and completed on 6 August for service with the Mediterranean Fleet. Hoste was relieved by Captain Frederick Campbell on 6 December and he was relieved in his turn by Captain Geoffrey Hornby on 11 February 1861, still in the Mediterranean Fleet. Neptune was paid off on 17 December 1862 and was sold to Henry Castle & Sons on 23 January 1875 to be scrapped at Charlton, London.
