= Second Battle of Chuenpi =

1841 battle of the First Opium War

Coordinates: 22°45′41.45″N 113°39′30.58″E

- Part of the First Opium War
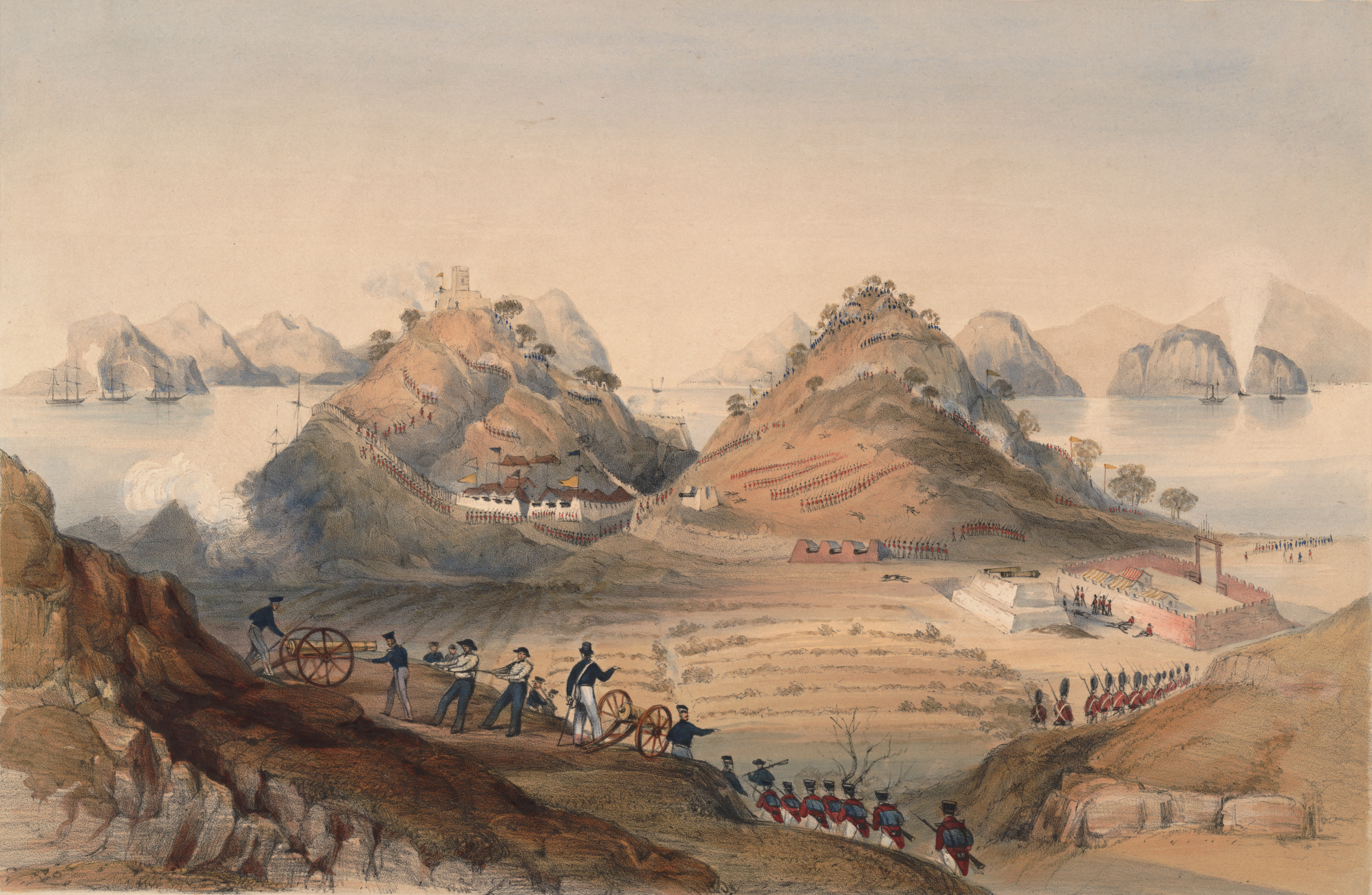
- British forces advancing in Chuenpi
Date	7 January 1841
Location	Humen, Guangdong, China
Result	British victory: Signing of the Convention of Chuenpi

Belligerents
United Kingdom: East India Company	Qing China

Commanders and leaders
Gordon Bremer; Charles Elliot	Guan Tianpei; Qishan

Strength
3 ships of the line 3 frigates 2 paddle frigates 1 corvette 2 sloops 1 bomb ketch 1,500 men 3 guns^{2}	15 junks 2,000 men 2 forts

Casualties and losses
38 wounded	277 killed 467 wounded 100 captured 11 junks destroyed 191 guns captured 2 forts captured
- ^{1} Cession formally ratified in the Treaty of Nanking (1842).^{2} Involved in the Chuenpi landing force only.

The Second Battle of Chuenpi (Note: Charles Elliot wrote "Chuenpee" for what some have written "Chuenpi" and is called "Chuanbi" (穿鼻) in pinyin.) (Chinese: 第二次穿鼻之戰) was fought between British and Chinese forces in the Pearl River Delta, Guangdong, China, on 7 January 1841 during the First Opium War. The British launched an amphibious attack at the Humen strait (Bogue), capturing the forts on the islands of Chuenpi and Taikoktow. Subsequent negotiations between British Plenipotentiary Charles Elliot and Chinese Imperial Commissioner Qishan resulted in the Convention of Chuenpi on 20 January. As one of the terms of the agreement, Elliot announced the cession of Hong Kong Island to the British Empire, after which the British took formal possession of the island on 26 January, which lasted for over 156 years of British colonial rule in Hong Kong until it was handed over back to China in 1997 by midnight.

== Background ==
In September 1840, the Daoguang Emperor of the Qing dynasty fired Imperial Commissioner Lin Zexu and replaced him with Qishan. British Foreign Secretary Lord Palmerston instructed Plenipotentiary Charles Elliot to have the ports of Canton, Amoy, Fuzhou, Ningbo, and Shanghai opened for trade; to acquire the cession of at least one island (or if the Chinese refused, the establishment of a secure British enclave on the mainland); and to secure compensation for confiscated opium as well as military costs incurred in China. On 1 December, Elliot wrote to Palmerston that these demands would be secured within ten days. Three days after the deadline, Elliot wrote to Governor-General of India Lord Auckland that he had failed to get the concessions, but one was still in prospect. He then conceded that any settlement would be "far short of the demands of the government."

In negotiations with Qishan, Elliot wanted $7 million over a period of six years and the surrender of Amoy and Chusan as permanent British possessions. Qishan offered $5 million over twelve years, so they agreed to $6 million. However, Qishan refused Elliot's territorial demands. On 17 December, Elliot countered with an offer to abandon Zhoushan, which the British captured in July 1840, and for another port to be chosen later in its place. After Qishan rejected the offer, Elliot told him, "There are very large forces collected here, and delays must breed amongst them a very great impatience." The year passed with no final settlements. An opium clipper that subsequently sailed into Canton brought with it a rumour that the emperor had decided to wage war. On 5 January 1841, Elliot prepared for an attack on Canton, informing Qishan that an attack would commence in two days if agreement could not be reached. He allowed Commodore Gordon Bremer, commander-in-chief of the British forces, to make offensive operations.

== Battle ==
British operations began at 8:00 am on 7 January from Sampanchow Island, 3 miles (4.8 kilometres) below the Humen strait (Bogue). By 9:00 am, the East India Company steamers Enterprise, Madagascar, and Nemesis assisted in embarking the following forces who landed unopposed 2 miles (3.2 kilometres) below the Chuenpi Island artillery batteries:

- 504 Royal Marines under Captain Samuel Ellis
- 33 Royal Artillery under Captain J. Knowles, operating a 24-pounder howitzer and two 6-pounder field guns
- 137 seamen from the Wellesley, Blenheim, and Melville under Lieutenant Wilson
- 104 troops of the 26th and 49th Regiments under Major Johnstone
- 607 troops of the 37th Madras Native Infantry under Captain Duff
- 76 Bengal Volunteers under Captain Bolton

An additional 30 seamen assisted in dragging the 24-pounder and two 6-pounders into position, and 15 sailors from the Blenheim were employed in the rocket and ammunition service. Major Thomas Pratt of the 26th Regiment commanded the land force of about 1,500 men. After advancing 1.5 miles (2.4 kilometres), the British spotted the upper fort and an entrenchment comprising a deep ditch with surrounding breastwork. The Chinese cheered when they saw the British, waved their flags in defiance, and opened fire from the batteries. In response, the British cannons on the crest of the hill commenced firing. The Chinese then returned fire for about 20 minutes. The steamers Queen and Nemesis, under Captain Edward Belcher of the Sulphur, fired shells into the upper fort while the Calliope, Hyacinth, and Larne ships (under Captain Thomas Herbert) attacked the lower fort. In less than an hour, the combined bombardment silenced the Chinese batteries. By 10:00 am, the upper fort had been captured, and the lower fort surrounded and stormed by Royal Marines. After the capture, the Nemesis attacked a fleet of about 15 war junks under Admiral Guan Tianpei in Anson's Bay. (Note: Anson's Bay lies between Chuenpi and Anunghoy Island, north of Chuenpi.) The junks mounted 7 to 11 guns of various calibre from 4- to 12-pounders. The ship fired a Congreve rocket that struck a junk near the admiral, which a British officer described as follows:

The Nemesis (right background) destroying Chinese war junks in Anson's Bay during the First Opium War, 7 January 1841 (by Edward Duncan)

The very first rocket fired from the Nemesis was seen to enter the large junk ... and almost the instant afterwards it blew up with a terrific explosion, launching into eternity every soul on board, and pouring forth its blaze like the mighty rush of fire from a volcano. The instantaneous destruction of the huge body seemed appalling to both sides engaged. The smoke, and flame, and thunder of the explosion, with the broken fragments falling round, and even portions of dissevered bodies scattering as they fell, were enough to strike with awe, if not fear, the stoutest heart that looked upon it.

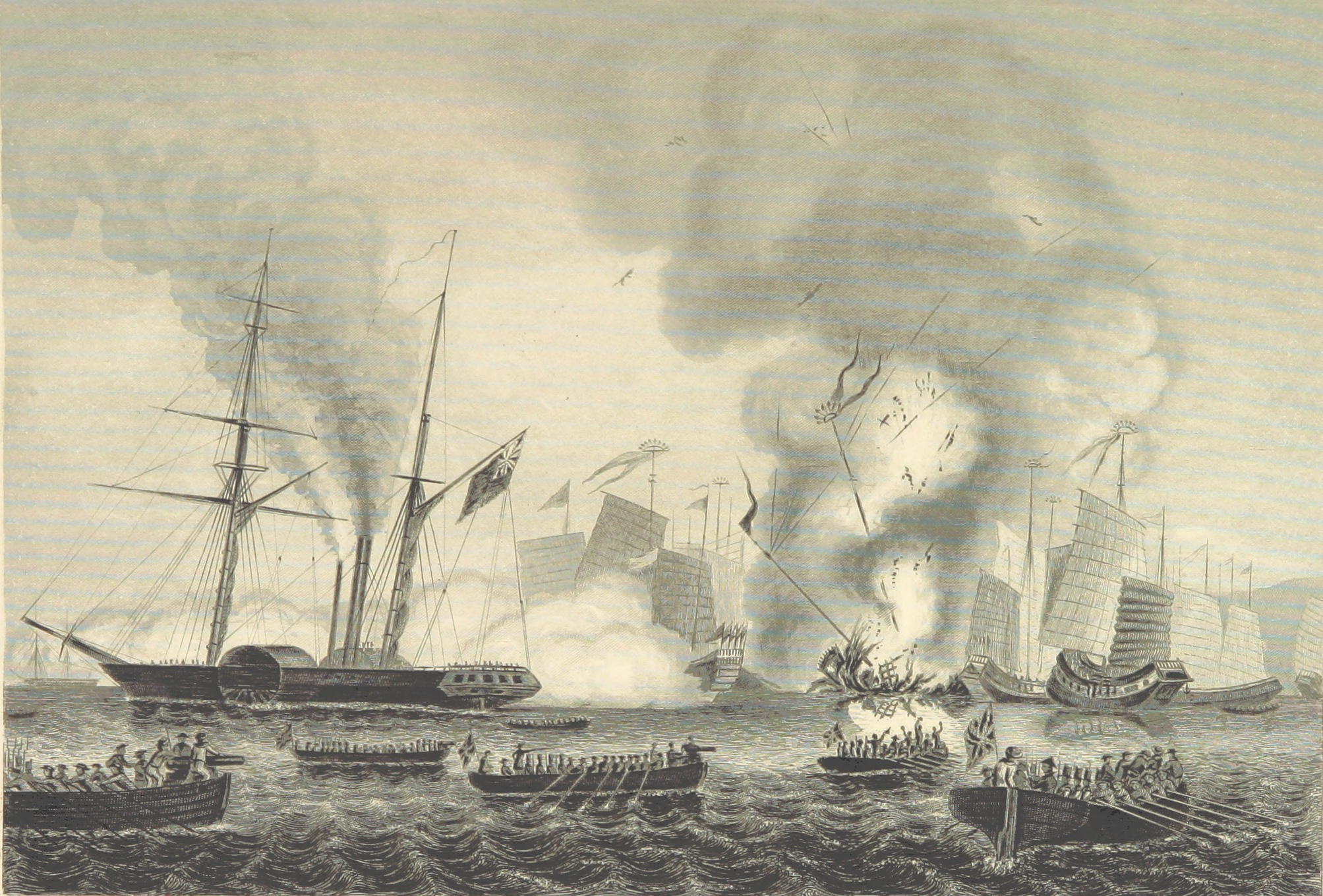
Nemesis and other British boats engaging Chinese junks at Chuenpi

At about 11:30 am, the Chinese on board the junks hauled down their flags. At noon, two cutters of the Nemesis sailed towards Admiral Guan's junk, described by an officer as "immensely large" and mounting 14 or 15 guns, some of them brass and "beautifully chased". They found only one man on board who after seeing the crew board the ship, jumped over the bow. Meanwhile, Captain James Scott of the Samarang commanded the attack on Taikoktow Island (west of Chuenpi). When the forts began firing on the British vessels at 10:20 am, the Samarang returned fire ten minutes later after anchoring 200 yards (180 metres) away. The Modeste, Druid, and Columbine later anchored in succession. Scott reported that "in a few minutes, so destructive and well directed was the fire of our ships, that that of the enemy was silenced, with the exception of an occasional gun or two." At 11:20 am, the ships embarked their crewmen to storm the forts where the Chinese remained inside until driven out. The Chinese could not withstand the onslaught of British muskets during hand-to-hand combat. After capturing the forts, the Chinese guns were spiked and thrown into the river.

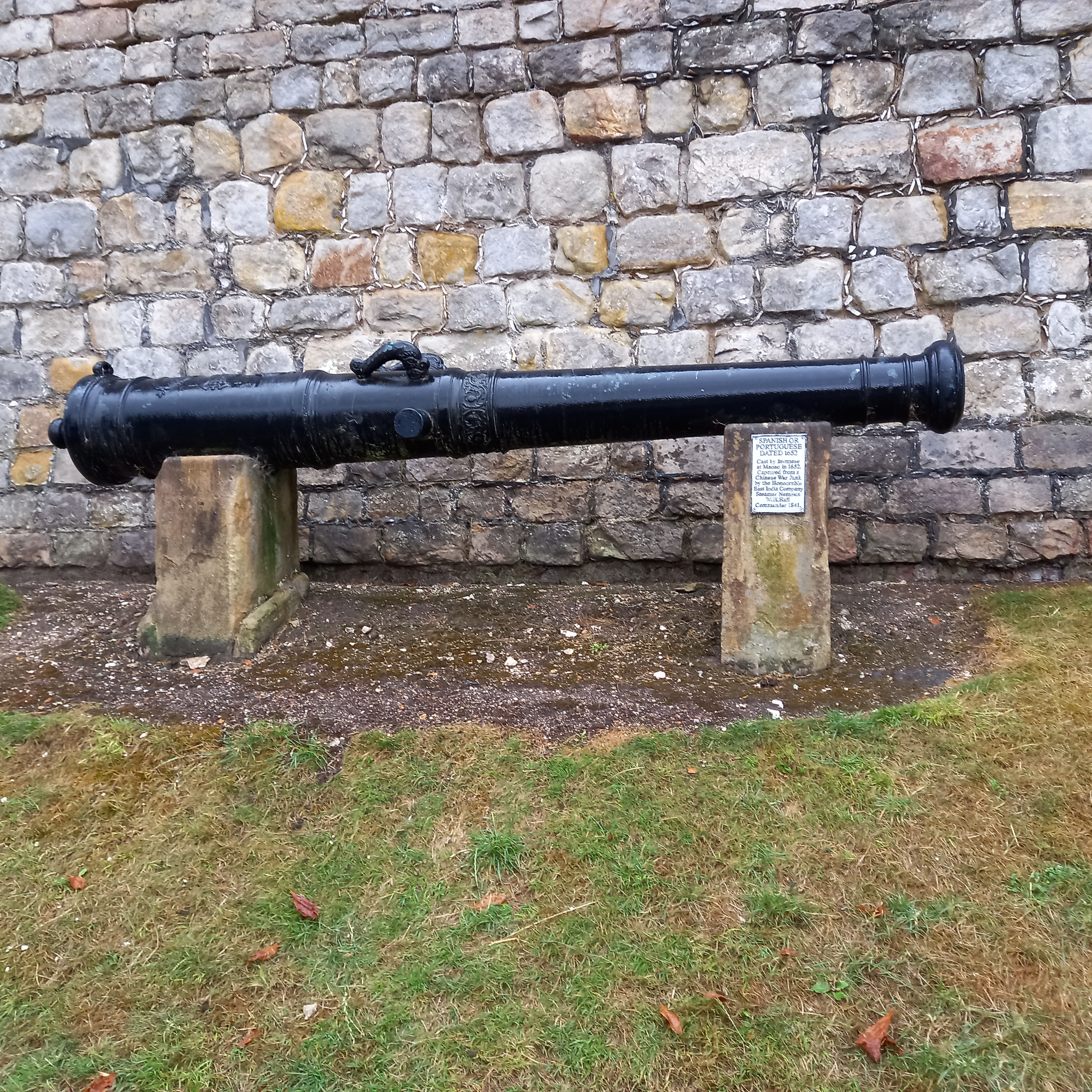
A 17th century cannon "captured from a Chinese War Junk" by Nemesis and now on display at Windsor Castle.

In total, 38 British were wounded, many from an explosion of an extensive magazine after capturing the Chuenpi fort. Commodore Bremer credited the Chinese for fighting "with the greatest credit and devotion" in the batteries and reported their losses at 500 to 600 out of a force of 2,000 men. Chinese records indicate 744 casualties (277 killed and 467 wounded). The high Chinese casualties were due to the impression they had that British troops would give no quarter. 100 Chinese prisoners who laid down their arms were released the next day. 11 junks were destroyed and 191 artillery pieces were captured. According to Qing scholar Wei Yuan, Kuan sent Rear-Admiral Li T'ing-Yü to Canton to request more troops, which the "whole official body" supported except Qishan, who spent the night writing peace proposals.

== Aftermath ==
Elliot sent a Chinese prisoner to Kuan, with a letter explaining "the usages of civilised warfare" and that if the forts did not hoist their colours the following day, they would not be attacked. At 11:30 am on 8 January, British ships led by the Blenheim sailed up the Bocca Tigris. As they approached Anunghoy Island (north of Chuenpi), a boat rowed by an old woman displayed a white flag. A man from the ship was taken on board a British vessel to deliver a request from Kuan that hostilities be suspended for three days to contact Qishan. Cancellation of the attack order prompted Lieutenant John Ouchterlony to note that it "certainly created a feeling of great disappointment throughout the fleet." Elliot addressed the cancellation in a circular aboard the Wellesley: "A communication has been received from the Chinese commander-in-chief, which has led to an armistice, with the purpose to afford the high commissioner time to consider certain conditions now offered for his acceptance."

On 20 January, after the Convention of Chuenpi, Elliot announced "the conclusion of preliminary arrangements" between Qishan and himself. They involved the cession of Hong Kong Island to the United Kingdom, a £6 million indemnity payable to the British government, direct and equal ties between the countries, and trade in Canton to be opened within ten days following the Chinese new year. They also agreed to the restoration of Chuenpi and Taikoktow to the Chinese, and the evacuation of Zhoushan. On 26 January, the Union Jack was raised on Hong Kong, and Commodore Bremer took formal possession of the island, under a feu de joie from the marines and a royal salute from the anchored men-of-war. On 29 January, Elliot proclaimed that Chinese natives "shall be governed according to the laws and customs of China, every description of torture excepted" and that "all British subjects and foreigners residing, or resorting to the island of Hong Kong, shall enjoy full security and protection, according to the principles and practice of British law".

When the news reached the emperor, he ordered Qishan to be "degraded from his office" and to stand trial at the Board of Punishments. Qishan faced several charges including giving "the barbarians Hongkong as a dwelling place". In his response, he claimed, "I pretended to do so from the mere force of circumstances, and to put them off for a time, but had no such serious intention." The court denounced him as a traitor and sentenced him to death. He was imprisoned for several months, but at the end of 1841 he was allowed, without authority or rank, to deal with the British. On 21 April 1841, Lord Palmerston wrote a letter of reprimand to Elliot and recalled him for not securing the earlier demands as ordered. Palmerston dismissed Hong Kong as "a barren island with hardly a house upon it." In May 1841, Henry Pottinger replaced Elliot as plenipotentiary.

Queen Victoria addressed the events in a letter to her uncle, King Leopold I of Belgium, on 13 April:

The Chinese business vexes us much, and Palmerston is deeply mortified at it. All we wanted might have been got, if it had not been for the unaccountably strange conduct of Charles Elliot ... who completely disobeyed his instructions and tried to get the lowest terms he could. [...] The attack and storming of the [Chuenpi] Forts on the 7th of January was very gallantly done by the Marines, and immense destruction of the Chinese took place. The accounts of the cruelty of the Chinese to one another are horrible. Albert is so much amused at my having got the Island of Hong Kong, and we think Victoria ought to be called Princess of Hong Kong in addition to Princess Royal.

== Notes ==
Footnotes

Citations
