= HMS Arachne (1809) =

Brig-sloop of the Royal Navy

- Arachne

History

United Kingdom
- Name: HMS Arachne
- Builder: Thomas Hills, Sandwich
- Laid down: September 1808
- Launched: 18 February 1809
- Fate: Sold 1837

General characteristics
- Class & type: Cruizer-class brig-sloop
- Tons burthen: 38241/94 (bm)
- Length: 100 ft (30 m) (overall); 77 ft 3 1/2 in (23.559 m) (keel)
- Beam: 30 ft 6 in (9.30 m)
- Depth of hold: 12 ft 9 in (3.89 m)
- Sail plan: Brig
- Complement: 121
- Armament: 2 × 6-pounder bow guns; 16 × 32-pounder carronades

HMS Arachne was an 18 gun Cruizer-class brig-sloop that served in the First Anglo-Burmese War and was sold into merchant service in 1837. She was wrecked in 1848 on the Australian coast.

== History ==
Arachne was laid down in September 1808 and launched on 18 February 1809 by Hills Yard in Sandwich, Kent. In 1824, she was converted to a ship sloop before seeing extensive action in the 1824–26 First Anglo-Burmese War. In January 1837, the Arachne was sold into merchant service.

== Sinking ==
In late May or early June 1848, the Arachne was anchored in Trial Bay, having on board 80 barrels of sperm oil. She sank in Yanerby and called for Trial Bay, however it was too late for the ship was already under. The ship had a crew of 23 and it is known that no people perished when the ship sunk.

The ship is located at coordinates 135°38'.083 E, 32°22'.950 S
