= HMS Larne (1829) =

Sloop of the Royal Navy

History

United Kingdom
- Name: Larne
- Ordered: 15 May 1821
- Builder: Pembroke Dockyard
- Laid down: July 1828
- Launched: 2 June 1829
- Completed: 16 September 1829
- Commissioned: 15 June 1829
- Fate: Broken up by 28 March 1866

General characteristics
- Class & type: Comet-class sloop
- Tons burthen: 462 63/94 bm
- Length: 113 ft 3 in (34.5 m) (gundeck); 93 ft 3 in (28.4 m) (keel)
- Beam: 30 ft 11 in (9.4 m)
- Depth: 8 ft (2.4 m)
- Complement: 125
- Armament: 2 × 6-pdr cannon; 16 × 32-pdr carronades

HMS Larne was an 18-gun Comet-class sloop built for the Royal Navy during the 1820s. She was broken up in 1866.

== Description ==
Larne had a length at the gundeck of 113 feet 3 inches (34.5 m) and 93 feet 3 inches (28.4 m) at the keel. She had a beam of 30 feet 11 inches (9.4 m), and a depth of hold of 8 feet (2.4 m). The ship's tonnage was 462 63/94 tons burthen. The Comet class was armed with a pair of 9-pounder cannon in the bow and sixteen 32-pounder carronades. The ships had a crew of 125 officers and ratings.

== Construction and career ==
EIC ship Nemesis, with boats from the Sulphur, Calliope, Larne and Starling, destroying Chinese war junks in Anson's Bay, on 7 January 1841.

Larne, the second ship of her name to serve in the Royal Navy, was ordered with the name of Orestes on 15 May 1821, renamed Lightning on 30 January 1822, laid down in July 1828 at Pembroke Dockyard, Wales, and launched on 2 June 1829. She was completed on 16 September 1829 at Plymouth Dockyard and commissioned on 25 June 1829. The ship was again renamed as Larne on 12 September 1832.
