= HMS Hyacinth (1829) =

Sloop of the Royal Navy

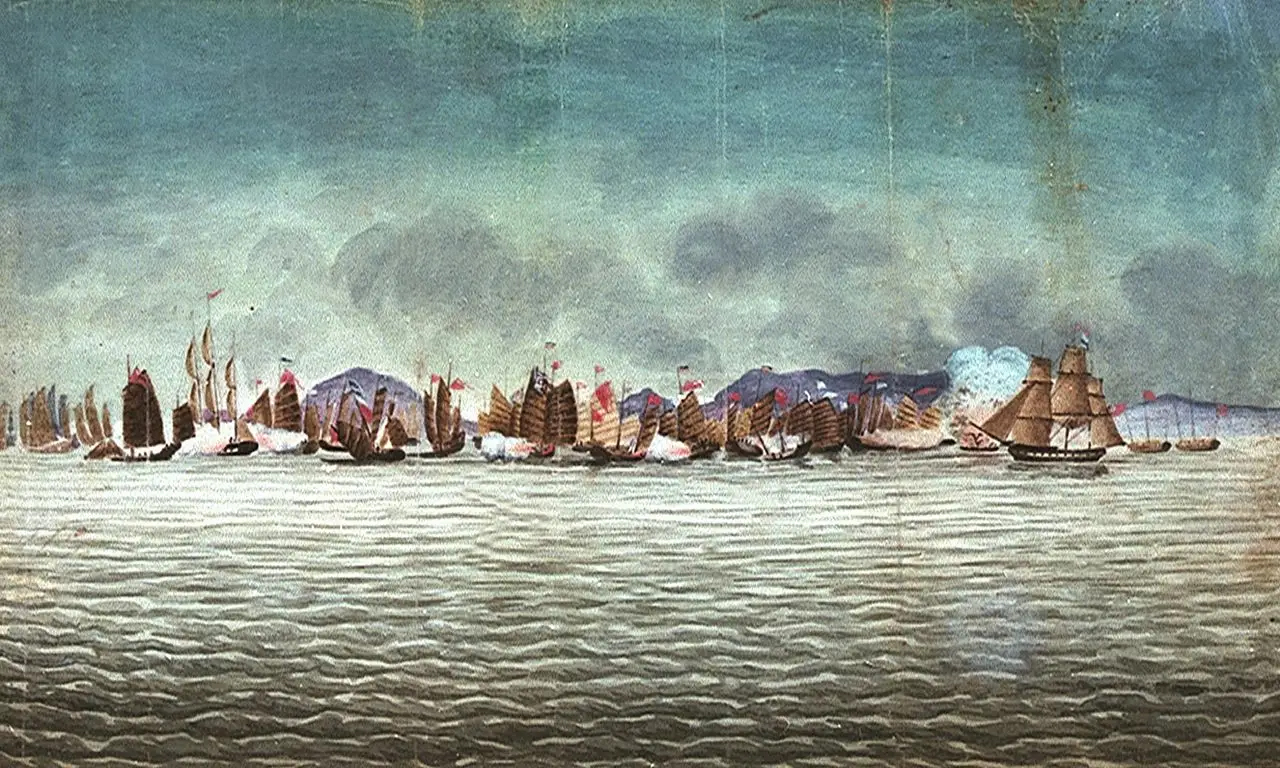
- Hyacinth and Volage engage Chinese war junks, 3 November 1839

History

United Kingdom
- Name: HMS Hyacinth
- Ordered: 10 June 1823
- Builder: Plymouth Dockyard
- Cost: £17,361 including fitting (Note: A total cost accounting for inflation of approximately £1,647,900 in today's money.)
- Laid down: March 1826
- Launched: 6 May 1829
- Commissioned: 12 January 1830
- Fate: Coal hulk at Portland, November 1860; Breaking completed in November 1871

General characteristics
- Class & type: Favorite-class ship sloop
- Tons burthen: 429 40/94 bm
- Length: 109 ft 6 in (33.4 m) (gundeck); 86 ft 9 1/2 in (26.5 m) (keel)
- Beam: 30 ft 9 in (9.4 m) oa
- Depth of hold: 12 ft 9 in (3.9 m)
- Sail plan: Full-rigged ship
- Complement: 125
- Armament: 16 × 32-pounder carronades; 2 × 9-pounder bow chasers; Reduced to 14 guns in 1848

External image
- A contemporary 1:60 full hull model of Hyacinth at the National Maritime Museum

HMS Hyacinth was an 18-gun Royal Navy ship sloop. She was launched in 1829 and surveyed the north-eastern coast of Australia under Francis Price Blackwood during the mid-1830s. She took part in the First Opium War, destroying, with HMS Volage, 29 Chinese junks. She became a coal hulk at Portland in 1860 and was broken up in 1871.

== Design and construction ==
Hyacinth was the second of four Favorite-class ship sloops, which were a ship-rigged and lengthened version of the 1796 Cruizer-class brig-sloop. All four ships of the class were ordered on 10 June 1823 and Hyacinth was laid down at Plymouth Dockyard in March 1826. She was launched on 6 May 1829 and commissioned for the West Indies Station on 12 January 1830.

=== Dimensions ===
Hyacinth measured 109 ft 6 in (33.4 m) along the gun deck by 30 ft 9 in (9.4 m) in the beam, and had a tonnage of 429 40/94 bm. She was flush-decked with a small forecastle and quarterdeck.

=== Armament ===
She was armed with sixteen 32-pounder carronades and two 9-pounder bow chaser guns.

== Service ==
During her 42-year career, she was stationed in the West and East Indies from 1829–41, took part in the First Opium War from 1841–42, and from 1843-46 was stationed off the west coast of Africa in the suppression of the slave trade. After being reduced to 14 guns in 1848, she later became a coal hulk at Portsmouth. On 2 October 1871, Hyacinth drove ashore and sank in the Clarence Creek. She was subsequently broken up.
