= James Scott (Royal Navy officer) =

Royal Navy Admiral (1790–1882)

Admiral Sir James Scott KCB
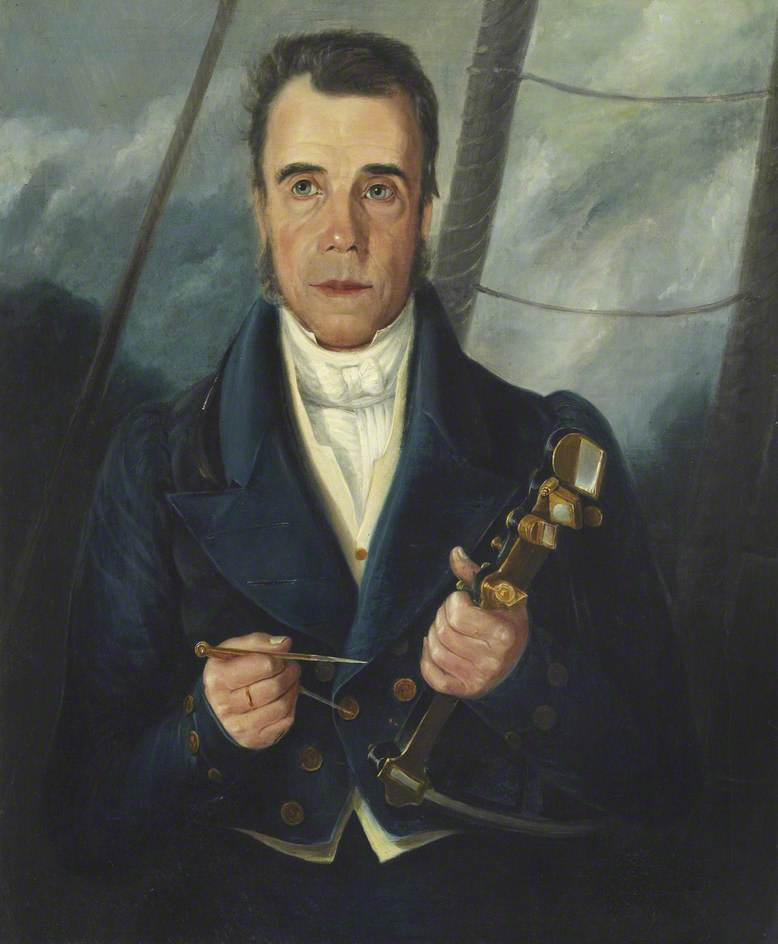
- Captain James Scott holding a compass
- Born: 18 June 1790; London, England
- Died: 2 March 1872 (aged 81); Cheltenham, England
- Military career
- Allegiance: United Kingdom
- Branch: Royal Navy
- Service years: 1803–1866
- Rank: Admiral
- Commands: HMS Meteor; HMS Harlequin; HMS President; HMS Samarang
- Conflicts: Napoleonic Wars; Invasion of Martinique; Walcheren Campaign; War of 1812; Battle of Craney Island; Raid on Chesconessex Creek; Battle of Bladensburg; Burning of Washington; Battle of Baltimore; First Opium War; Second Battle of Chuenpi; Battle of the Bogue; Broadway expedition; Battle of Canton
- Awards: Order of the Bath (Companion, 1841; Knight Commander, 1862)

Admiral Sir James Scott, KCB (18 June 1790 – 2 March 1872), was a British Royal Navy officer. He served in the Napoleonic Wars, the War of 1812, and the First Opium War.

== Early career ==
Scott was born in London, the son of Thomas Scott of Glenluce, Wigtownshire, Scotland. He joined the Navy in August 1803 as a first-class volunteer on board the frigate Phaeton, under the command of Captain George Cockburn. After taking the British Minister Plenipotentiary, Anthony Merry and his suite, to the United States, Phaeton sailed to the Cape of Good Hope, for operations against the French on the Isle de France. Scott was rated as a midshipman from September 1804. He returned to England in January 1806 with Captain Cockburn in the frigate Howe, with Marquess Wellesley aboard, returning from his time as Governor-General in India.

In February 1806m Scott joined the frigate Blanche, under Captain Thomas Lavie, and was present, on 19 July, at the capture of the Guerrière off the Faroe Islands. He rejoined Captain Cockburn in September to serve aboard Captain, cruising among the Western Islands and off Rochefort. From July 1807 to April 1808 he served aboard the 74-gun Achille, commanded by Captain Sir Richard King off Ferrol. He then rejoined Cockburn again to serve as master's mate aboard Pompee, which sailed to the Caribbean in late 1808, and took part in the reduction of Martinique in early 1809, during which Scott was slightly wounded.

He returned to England with Cockburn in Belleisle carrying the captive governor and garrison. Scott then took part in the Walcheren Campaign, commanding a gun-boat during the attack upon Flushing, and for his conduct he received a letter of thanks from Rear-Admiral Sir Richard Goodwin Keats, and on 16 November 1809 was appointed lieutenant aboard the sloop Fleche, Captain George Hewson. Scott was in her when she was wrecked off the mouth of the Elbe on 24 May 1810. In July he was appointed to the Barfleur on the Lisbon station, and in October joined the ship sloop Myrtle serving under Captain John Smith Cowan stationed off Lisbon, at the defence of Cádiz, and in the Mediterranean, and under Captain Clement Sneyd on the west coast of Africa until April 1812.

== American War ==
Scott rejoined his former captain, now Commodore Cockburn, in Grampus at Cádiz. In August 1812, Cockburn was promoted to rear-admiral and Scott followed him into his flagship Marlborough, which in November sailed to the coast of North America to take part in the War of 1812. On 3 April 1813, Scott commanded one of Marlborough's boats as part of squadron, under the command of Lieutenant James Polkinghorne, which pushed 15 miles up the Rappahannock River and captured four schooners. On 22 June 1813, Scott had charge of the Marlborough's launch, during the failed attack on Craney Island; four days later he assisted at the capture of Hampton. In July, now serving aboard Sceptre, he commanded her launch at the capture of Ocracoke Island on the coast of North Carolina, and at the capture of the privateers Anaconda and Atlas. In 1814, now serving as first lieutenant of Albion, Scott took part in the storming two forts on the eastern shore of the Chesapeake (including the 25 June Raid on Chesconessex Creek), in the destruction of Commodore Joshua Barney's Chesapeake Bay Flotilla on the Patuxent River, and served on shore as aide-de-camp to Rear Admiral Cockburn during the battle of Bladensburg, the burning of Washington, and at the failed attack on Baltimore.

== Commander and later career ==
On 19 October 1814, Scott was promoted to commander, but received no ship until 4 May 1824 when he was appointed to the bomb vessel Meteor to take part in the demonstration before Algiers made by Vice-Admiral Sir Harry Burrard-Neale. Subsequently, on 5 November, he took command of the brig-sloop Harlequin, serving at Cork and Jamaica until 1827.

He was promoted to post-captain on 8 January 1828, and published his autobiography Recollections of a Naval Life in 1834. He then served aboard President as flag captain to Admiral Sir George Cockburn on the North America and West Indies Station from June 1834 until 1836, then to Admiral Charles Ross on the Pacific Station from August 1837 until October 1839. On 31 October 1839, he was appointed to command of the sixth-rate post ship Samarang off South America, and then on the East Indies and China Station, serving in the Second Opium War.

He saw action in Second Battle of Chuenpi on 7 January 1841 in Samarang, having the frigate Druid, and the sloops Columbine and Modeste under his command during the attack on the fort at Tycocktow. On 26 February he took part in the Battle of the Bogue. Before the first investment of Canton, he moved temporarily into the East India Company's iron-hulled steamer Nemesis, commanded by Captain William Hutcheon Hall, to force a passage up the Broadway river between Macao and Whampoa. During the advance, on 13 to 15 March, aided by the boats of his own ship, he destroyed as many as five forts, one battery, two military stations, and nine war-junks, collectively armed with 115 guns and 8 gingalls. For his services he was made a Companion of the Order of the Bath on 29 June 1841. He left Samarang at the end of 1841, and saw no further service at sea.

Scott was promoted to rear admiral on 26 December 1854, then to vice admiral on 4 June 1861. He was made a Knight Commander of the Order of the Bath on 10 November 1862. Scott was finally promoted to admiral on 20 February 1865, but was then, against his own wishes, placed on the retired list under the terms of the Order in Council of 24 March 1866.

Admiral Scott died at Cheltenham on 2 March 1872.

== Personal life ==
On 3 May 1819, he married Caroline Ann, only child of Richard Donovan, of Tibberton Court, Gloucestershire. They had one son. It is interesting to note that the memorial tablet in St Paul's Cathedral, erected by his shipmates, lists his birthdate as June 18, 1787.

== See also ==
- Bibliography of 18th-19th century Royal Naval history
- Bibliography of early American naval history
