= William Hutcheon Hall =

Royal Navy Admiral (c. 1797–1878)

Admiral Sir William Hutcheon Hall KCB FRS
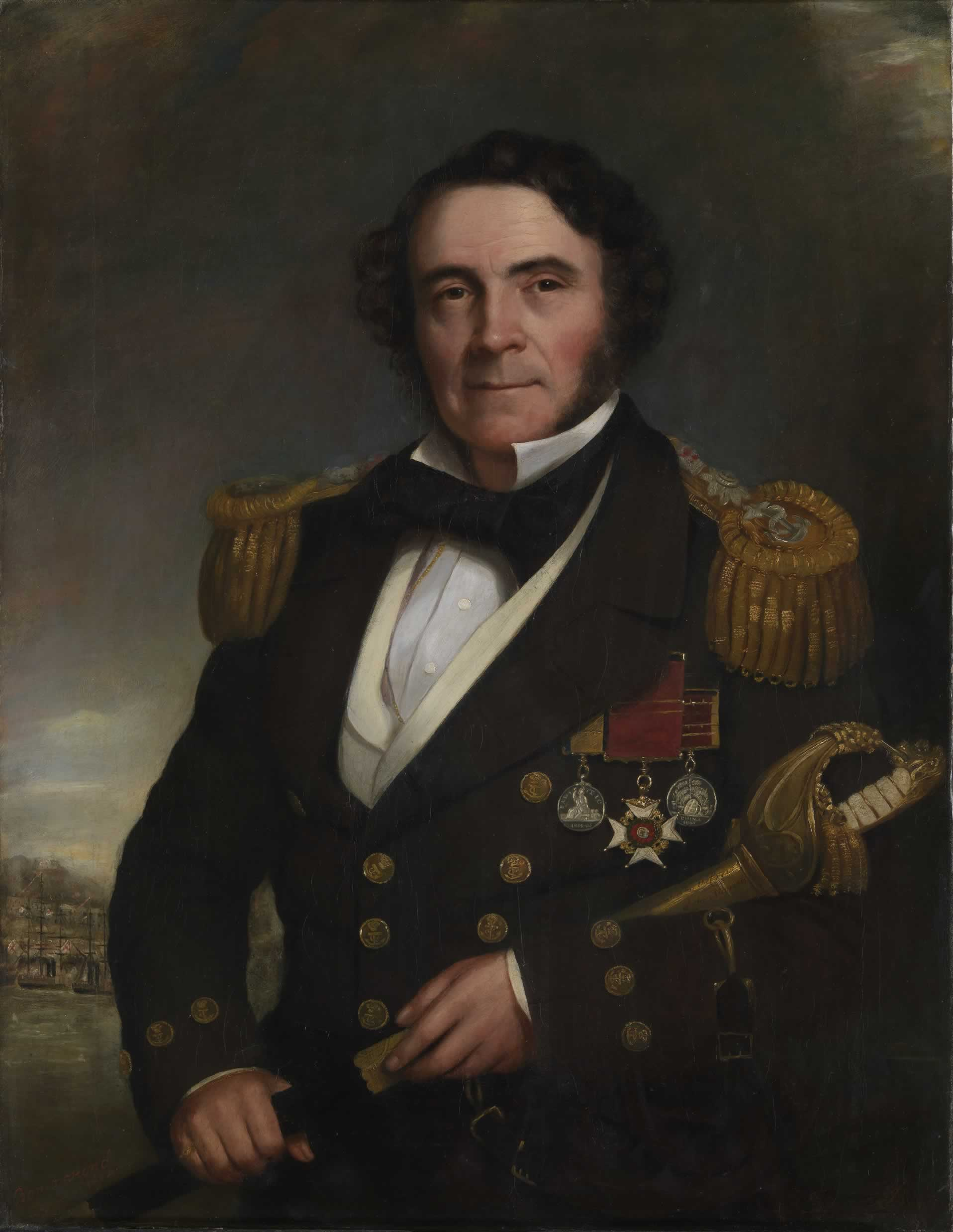
- Hall carrying a sword presented to him by the crew of the Nemesis, in the background is the bombardment of Bomarsund
- Born: c. 1797; Berwick, Northumberland, England
- Died: 25 June 1878 (aged 80–81); Kensington, London, England
- Burial place: St Lawrence's Church, England
- Military career
- Allegiance: United Kingdom
- Branch: Royal Navy
- Service years: 1811–1866
- Rank: Admiral
- Nickname: Nemesis Hall
- Commands: Nemesis; HMS Terrible; HMS Dragon; HMS Hecla; HMS Blenheim
- Conflicts: Napoleonic Wars; First Opium War; Second Battle of Chuenpi; Battle of the Bogue; Battle of First Bar; Broadway expedition; First Battle of Canton; Second Battle of Canton (WIA); Battle of Amoy; Capture of Chusan; Battle of Chinhai; Battle of Tzeki; Battle of Chapu; Battle of Woosung; Crimean War; Battle of Bomarsund; Bombardment of Sveaborg

Nemesis (right background) destroying Chinese junks in the Second Battle of Chuenpi

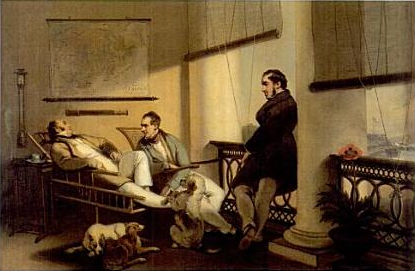
Hall (standing right) on the verandah of British merchant Lancelot Dent in China

Admiral Sir William Hutcheon Hall KCB FRS (c. 1797 – 25 June 1878), was a British Royal Navy officer. He served in the First Anglo-Chinese War and Crimean War. He was one of the first British officers to make a thorough study of steam engines. In China, he commanded the iron steamship Nemesis of the East India Company. Although it was not officially commissioned as a Royal Navy warship, the Admiralty enabled Hall to count his time in the Nemesis as if he had served in one of Her Majesty's Ships.

== Early life and career ==
Hall was born circa 1797 in Berwick, Northumberland, England, to William Hall and his wife Mary (née Hutcheon). He joined the Royal Navy on 24 October 1811 as a first-class volunteer on board HMS Warrior under Captains George Byng and John Tremayne Rodd. In 1816–17, he served as a midshipman under Captain Basil Hall, with whom he attended William Amherst's embassy visit to China. After returning to England in November 1817, he was appointed to the frigate, HMS Iphigenia, under Captain Robert Mends in the West Africa Squadron. He was later promoted as master of the sloop, HMS Morgiana. In this rank, he served in the British West Indies, Mediterranean, and Home stations until 1836. After studying steam engines in Glasgow, Scotland, and on board steamers trading to Ireland, he travelled to the United States, where he was employed in steamboats on the Delaware and Hudson.

== China ==
In November 1839, Hall obtained command of Nemesis of the British East India Company in China, where he served in the First Anglo-Chinese War (1839–42). For his services, the Admiralty procured an Order in Council to enable it to make him a lieutenant on 8 January 1841. The Admiralty later obtained power to enable him to count his time in the Nemesis as if he had served in one of Her Majesty's Ships. The ship's first engagement was against Chinese forts and a fleet of junks in the Second Battle of Chuenpi on 7 January 1841. He was Mentioned in Despatches for his part in the battle. He later fought in the Battle of First Bar on 27 February, and the Broadway expedition on 13–15 March. In commemoration of his service, he was commonly known in the navy as "Nemesis Hall". William Dallas Bernard, an Oxford graduate who studied life and customs in China, used Hall's notes to write an account of the war in the Narrative of the Voyages and Services of the Nemesis from 1840 to 1843 (1844). Under the command of Richard Collinson, then Lieutenant Hall also saw action on the island of Taisam near Ningbo in February 1842 on the Nemesis. He was promoted captain with seniority on 22 October 1842.

== Russia ==
After the outbreak of the Crimean War (1853–56) against Russia, Hall was not able to obtain command of a vessel corresponding to his seniority, so on 15 March 1854 he accepted the 6-gun paddle steamer, HMS Hecla, which was engaged in the Baltic and was again Mentioned in Despatches, and slightly wounded. He transferred to the 72-gun HMS Blenheim in November 1854, and in 1855 was engaged in the capture of Bomarsund, among other battles. Grand Duke Konstantin Nikolayevich, second son of Tsar Nicholas I, remarked, "of all bold and seamanlike operations, this of Captain Hall's—taking his steamer seven miles up a creek of intricate navigation in an enemy's country—is the most daring I could have imagined; I cannot but admire such gallantry, even in an enemy." Hall was appointed a Companion of the Order of the Bath on 5 July 1855.

== Works and later life ==
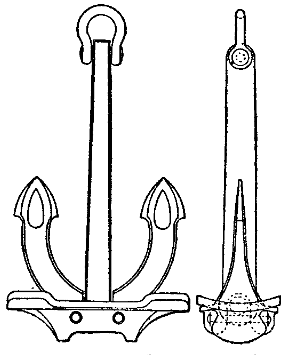
Hall's patent anchor; Hingley's became sole manufacturers of these anchors in 1891

Hall was one of the first British officers to make a thorough study of steam engines. He invented iron bilge tanks for ships, adopted by the navy, and "Hall's patent anchor". On 30 April 1845, he married Hilare Caroline Byng, third daughter of his first captain, George Byng. They had one daughter, Frances Russell Hall, who married Captain Charles Davis Lucas in 1879. Lucas had won the Victoria Cross while serving under Hall in 1854 aboard HMS Hecla. Hall was appointed to HMS William and Mary on 3 March 1847 to assist in relief efforts during the Great Famine of Ireland. He was transferred to HMS Dragon on 6 May. During his time in command of Dragon, he was reprimanded for the poor state of her gunnery, and the ship was paid off on 8 June 1850.

In 1847, Hall was elected a Fellow of the Royal Society, where he served several years in its council. His writings involved developing national defences, and employing boatmen, fishermen, and armed merchant steamers as part of the naval reserve. He was an active supporter of the Shipwrecked Mariners' Society for 26 years. In 1863, he was promoted to rear admiral. He retired from active service on 2 April 1866, was promoted a Knight Commander of the Order of the Bath on 13 March 1867, and was promoted (on the retired list) to vice admiral on 26 July 1869, and admiral on 11 December 1875. He died of apoplexy at Phillimore Gardens, Kensington, London, on 25 June 1878, and was buried in the churchyard of St. Lawrence's Church, Mereworth, Kent, on 29 June.

== Selected works ==
- Bernard, W. D.; Hall, W. H. (1844). Narrative of the Voyages and Services of the Nemesis from 1840 to 1843. Vol. 1 / Vol. 2. London: Henry Colburn.
- Bernard, W. D.; Hall, W. H. (1845). Narrative of the Voyages and Services of the Nemesis from 1840 to 1843 (2nd ed.). London: Henry Colburn.
- Bernard, W. D.; Hall, W. H. (1847). The Nemesis in China (3rd ed.). London: Henry Colburn.
- Hall, W. H. (1852). Sailors' Homes, Their Origin and Progress. London: W. H. Dalton.
- Hall, W. H. (1876). Our National Defences.
