= Nemesis (1839 ship) =

First British ocean-going iron warship

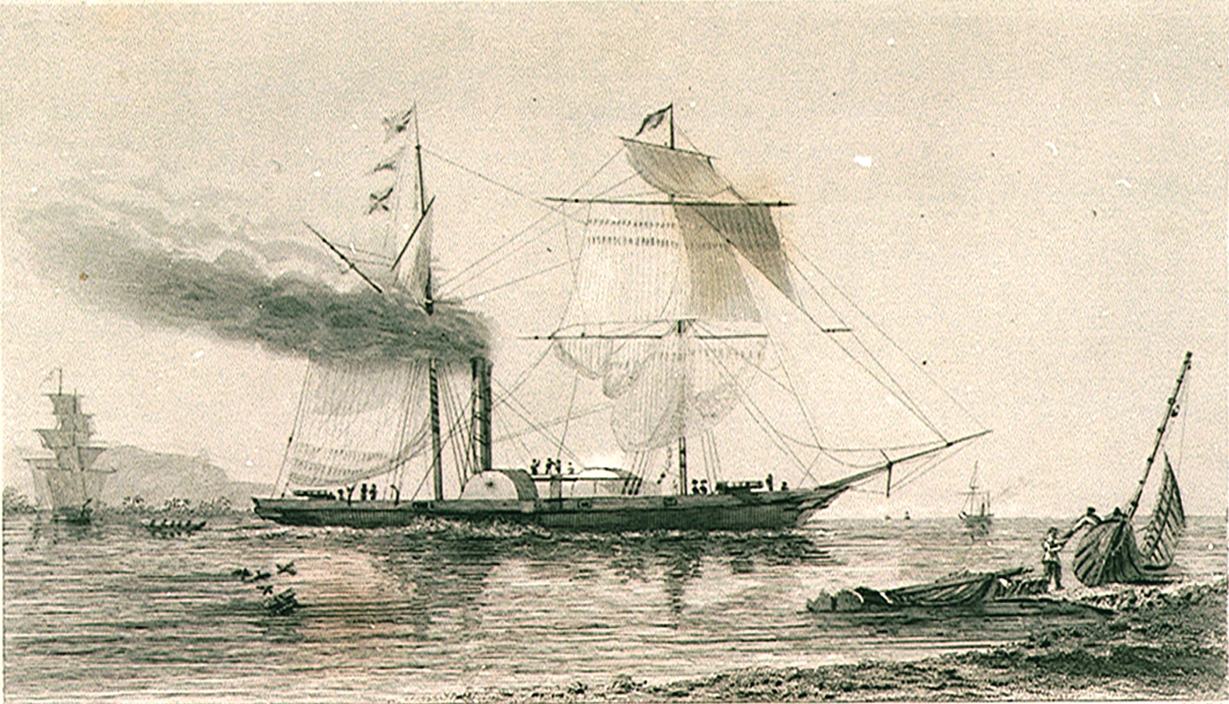
- An engraving of Nemesis (published 1844)

History
- Name: Nemesis
- Namesake: Nemesis
- Owner: East India Company
- Builder: Birkenhead Iron Works
- Launched: 1839
- Commissioned: March 1840
- Fate: Sold in 1852

General characteristics
- Class & type: Paddle frigate
- Tons burthen: 660 bm
- Length: 184 ft (56 m)
- Beam: 29 ft (8.8 m)
- Draught: 6 ft (1.8 m)
- Propulsion: Twin 60 horsepower George Forrester & Co. steam engines
- Armament: 2 × 32-pounder + 4 × 6-pounder guns, + 1 × Congreve rocket launcher

Nemesis was the first British ocean-going iron warship. She was the largest of a class of six similar vessels ordered by the 'Secret Committee' of the East India Company. Nemesis, together with her sister ships Phlegethon, Pluto, Proserpine, Ariadne, and Medusa, was built by John Laird's yard at Birkenhead and William Fairbairn & Sons at Millwall.

Launched in 1839, the Nemesis was deployed to China – arriving late 1840 – and used to great effect in the First Opium War by Captain William Hutcheon Hall and later in 1842 by Captain Richard Collinson. The Chinese referred to her as the "devil ship".

== Construction ==
Although commissioned by the Secret Committee of the East India Company (EIC) in 1839, the vessel did not appear in the EIC's list of ships, leading The Times to comment:

"...this vessel is provided with an Admiralty letter of licence or letter of marque. If so, it can only be against the Chinese; and for the purpose of smuggling opium she is admirably adapted."

Nemesis was a gunboat built by British shipbuilding company John Laird's Birkenhead Iron Works in three months. She had a length of 184 feet (56 m), a beam of 29 feet (8.8 m), a draught of 6 feet (1.8 m) when full of coal and less than 5 ft when laden with less, and a burthen of 660 tons. She was powered by two sixty horsepower Forrester engines. She was armed with two pivot-mounted 32-pounder and four 6-pounder guns. The steam- and sail-powered ship was particularly effective in China because her shallow draught of only five feet allowed her to travel up rivers to pursue and engage other vessels and targets.

Her watertight bulkheads were the first to be used in a warship. They enabled her to survive the hull damage she sustained during sea trials and en route to China in 1840. (Note: She "touched" a rock near Lands End after leaving Liverpool and was docked at Portsmouth in March 1840 to check for damage) In July 1840, Nemesis became the first iron ship to sail around the Cape of Good Hope, aided by techniques developed the year before by Sir George Airy, the Astronomer Royal, to adjust a compass for the effect of an iron hull. The adjustments were not particularly effective, with the result that the ship's compass performed poorly throughout its career.

== China ==
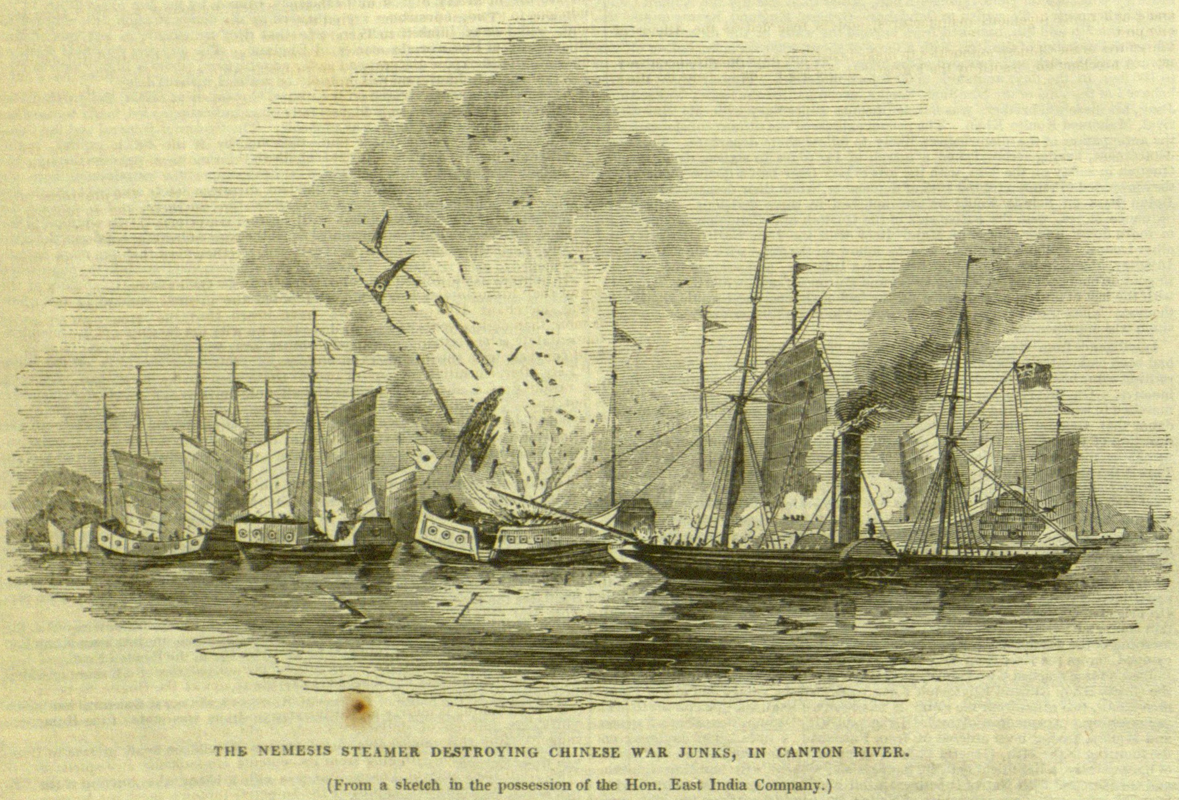
The Illustrated London News print of Nemesis during the First Opium War

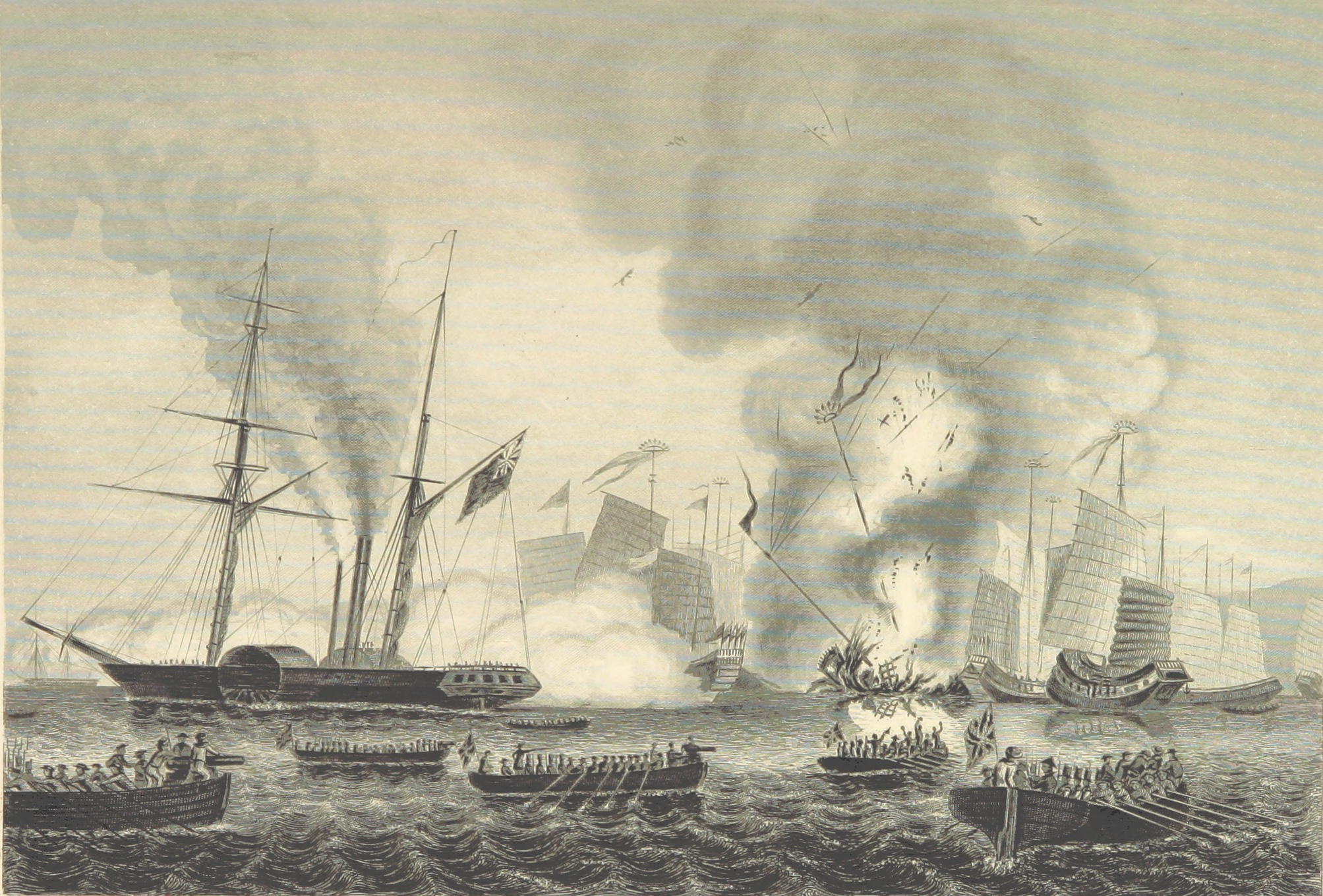
Nemesis and other British ships engaging Chinese junks in the Second Battle of Chuenpi, 7 January 1841

Nemesis arrived off the coast of China in late 1840, although when she set sail from Liverpool it was publicly intimated that she was bound for Odessa to keep the voyage a secret. A British officer wrote that the outbreak of the First Opium War "was considered an extremely favourable opportunity for testing the advantages or otherwise of iron steam-vessels." She first saw action in the Second Battle of Chuenpi on 7 January 1841 against the Chinese fleet at the Bocca Tigris forts. In the Battle of First Bar (27 February), Nemesis sank Cambridge, an old, but re-armed East Indiaman that the Chinese had purchased. Due to Nemesis's shallow draught, Nemesis was able to move through shallow water during the Broadway expedition on 13–15 March and aided in the capture of Canton on 18 March. Based in Chusan, she also saw action at Taisam in February 1842, in a successful skirmish associated with repulse of a much larger Chinese attack on Ningbo.

== Later career ==
After the First Opium War, Nemesis was tasked with the suppression of pirates near Indonesia and the Philippines.

She then operated from Bombay, chiefly to Karachi.

Around the end of 1846 as a result of mob rioting in Canton which had started in July, she was posted by Sir John Davis to cover the East India Company's factory there. She was then withdrawn before February 1847, despite protests from traders. In May 1847 she attacked a flotilla of Sooloo pirate prows in the Brunei river, Borneo. In early 1853, she helped the company's steamer Zenobia expel Burmese troops from Bassein province. She sailed from Shanghai on 1 February 1854, bound for Belfast.

Laird Brothers displayed a model of the H.E.I.C. "Nemesis" (1839) at the 1893 Chicago Exhibition.
