= Battle of First Bar =

Coordinates: 23°4′28.87″N 113°28′45.45″E

- Part of the First Opium War
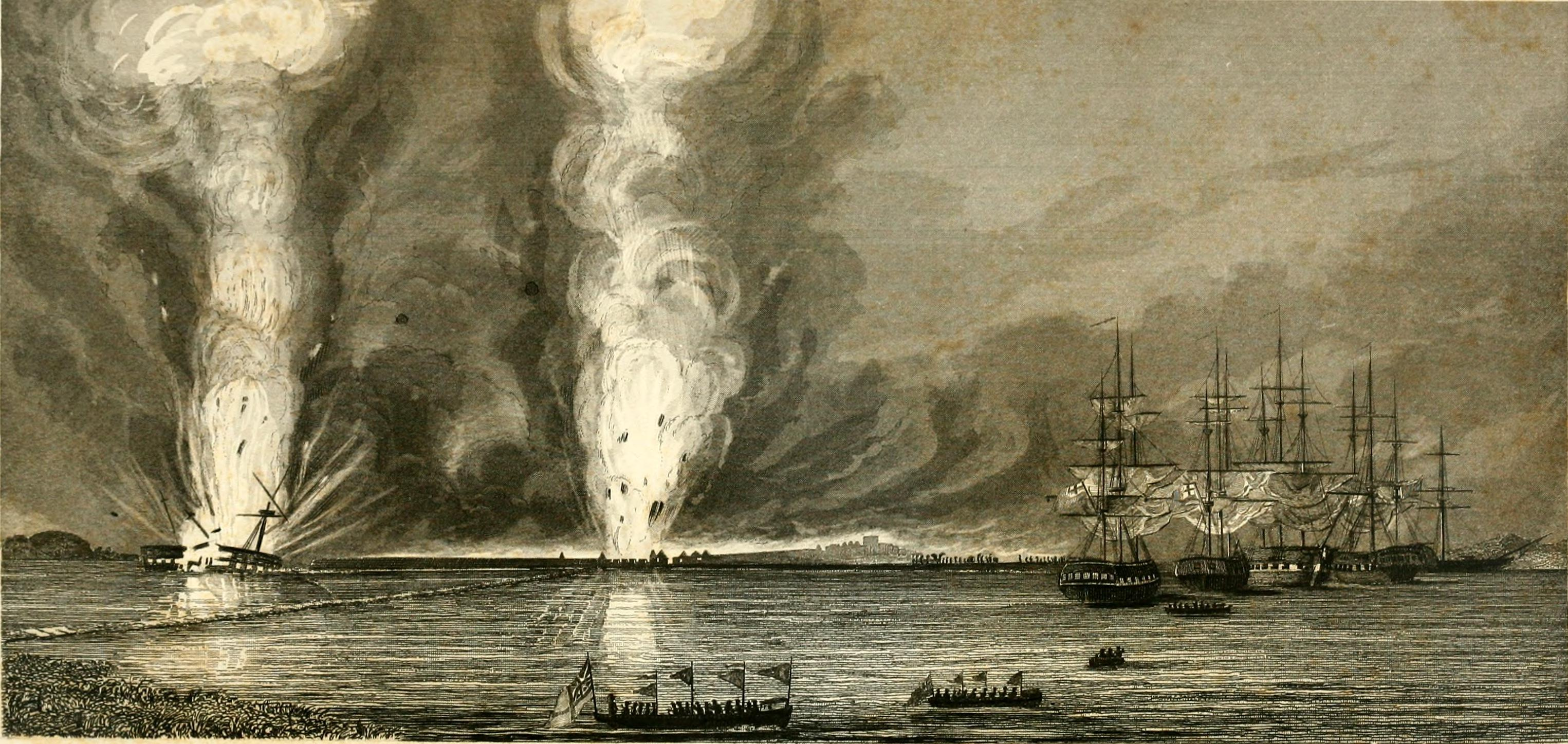
- Attack on the First Bar battery (published 1843)
Date	27 February 1841
Location	Pearl River, Guangdong, China
Result	British victory

Belligerents
United Kingdom: British East India Company	Qing China

Commanders and leaders
Gordon Bremer; Thomas Herbert	Hsiang-fu †; Yung-fu

Strength
2 steamers 4 corvettes 1 bomb ketch	2,000+ troops 40+ junks 1 East Indiaman

Casualties and losses
1 died (due to an accident); 8 wounded	300 killed 98 guns captured 1 East Indiaman destroyed

The Battle of First Bar was fought between British and Chinese forces at First Bar Island and its surrounding area in the Pearl River, Guangdong province, China, on 27 February 1841 during the First Opium War.

== Background ==
On 21 February 1841, former Imperial Commissioner Lin Zexu wrote that 1,000 regular troops from Hunan and the same number from Yunnan arrived in batches at Canton (Guangzhou). Lin met General Hsiang-fu of the Hunan troops in the afternoon and then General Yung-fu the next day. On 24 February, Lin, Imperial Commissioner Qishan, and other officials inspected the defences of the Pearl River, and spent the night at Lieh-te, 7 miles (11 km) east of Canton. The inspection continued the next day and ended early on 26 February at Ta-huang-chiao, 8 miles (13 km) south of Canton.

== Battle ==
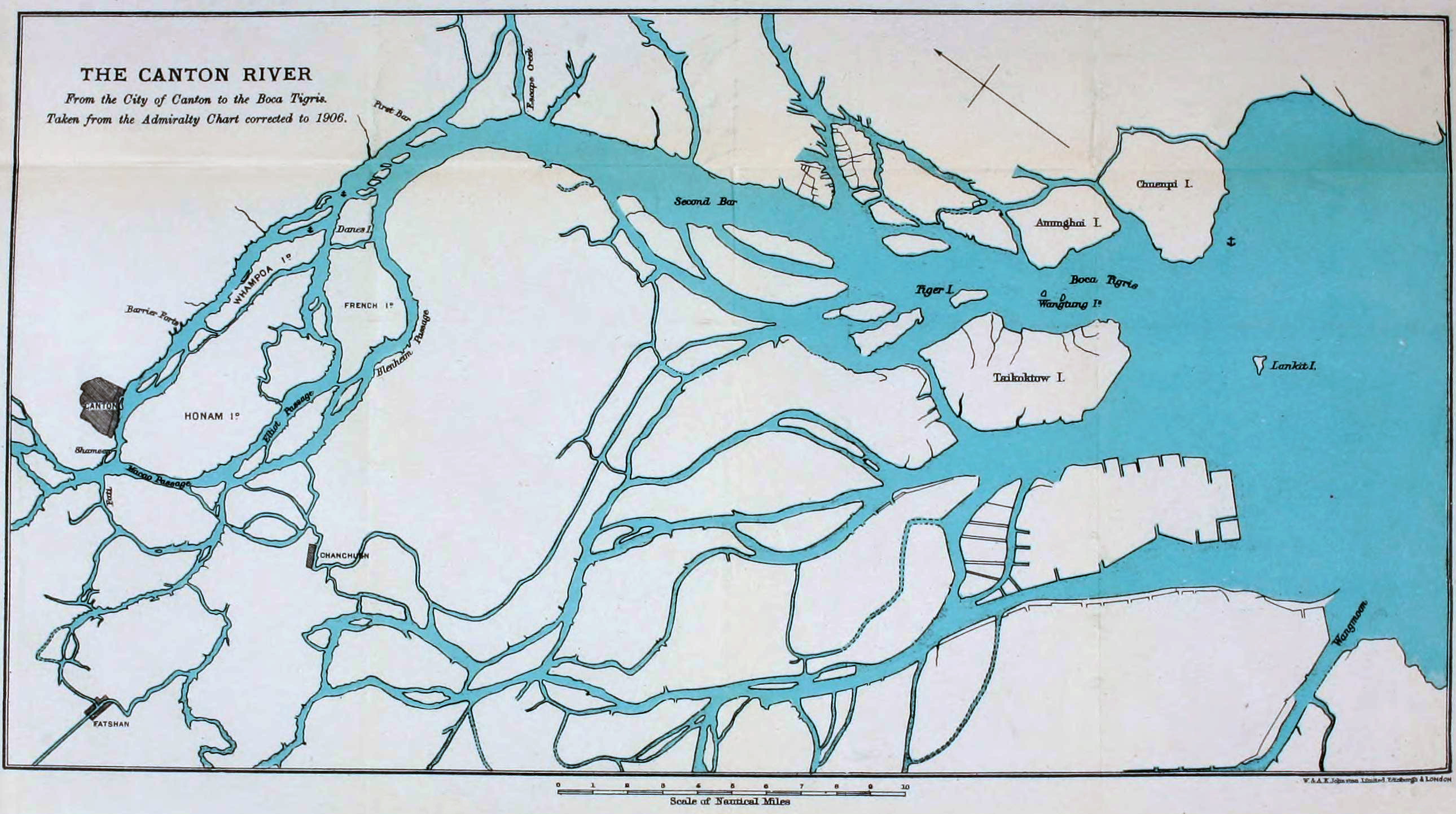
Map of the Pearl River, showing First Bar

On the morning of 27 February, Calliope, Herald, Alligator, Sulphur, Modeste, and the steamers Madagascar and Nemesis sailed past the Bocca Tigris along the Pearl River. Lieutenant John Elliot Bingham of the Modeste wrote, "As these ships sped along, the shore was lined with thousands of the inhabitants gazing on the bold barbarians, many of them, no doubt, secretly wishing them success." Commodore Gordon Bremer, commander-in-chief of British forces, placed Captain Thomas Herbert of Calliope in command of the fleet. After sailing past Tiger Island and Second Bar, they reached near First Bar Island by noon. There, the British spotted Cambridge, a former East Indiaman, hoisting the red flag of a Chinese admiral. The long Chinese field fortifications facing the river mounted 47 guns, and rows of white tents in the neighbouring paddy fields indicated a large number of Tartar troops. Over 40 war junks were further up the river.

As the steamers advanced, the Chinese batteries opened fire, which the British vigorously returned with shells and rockets. Modeste sailed within 300 yards (270 m) of the shore and fired broadsides before the other ships joined the cannonade. The Chinese forces made a determined resistance, but could not withstand the broadsides. The shells and rockets from Madagascar and Nemesis had a destructive effect, setting fire to much of the camp. Cambridge opened fire, but was soon overwhelmed by artillery from the British ships. Her crew jumped overboard to make way for the shore. Although the junks made a large amount of noise, they kept out of range from the British fleet.

After an hour, the Chinese batteries were nearly silenced, and the British forces landed. Herbert reported, "I landed with the seamen and marines ... and stormed the works, driving before us upwards of two thousand of their best troops, and killing nearly three hundred." Bingham wrote, "As the enemy fled before Lieutenant Stransham's party, they attempted to cross a deep branch of the river, in which numbers of them perished, and many were shot." The British captured the forts about half an hour after landing.

During the land operations, Lieutenant Watson of Calliope and other officers boarded Cambridge, and soon captured it after a resistance from the few Chinese crew that remained. The ship was found to mount 34 guns. Orders were sent to the officer to set it on fire. Shortly after dark, the fire exploded its magazine, hurling the masts and beams in the air. Herbert wrote that the explosion was so loud that it "must have been heard at Canton." A total of 98 Chinese guns were captured during the day. The British casualties were one seaman killed, six seamen wounded, and two marines wounded. The seaman who died on Modeste had the hammer of his musket caught on the ship's thwart and when the piece discharged, the ball shot through his head.

== Aftermath ==
On 28 February, Lin wrote, "I hear that yesterday the English rebels broke resistance at Wu-yung. The regulars from Hunan were stationed there, and had heavy losses, their Commander Hsiang-fu being also among the killed." Lin said that 100 trained militiamen came afterwards from Hsiang-fu's camp, but did not reach Wu-yung in time for the attack, and that in the afternoon, Qishan, Deng Tingzhen, and Yiliang began a meeting.
