= Robert Thom (translator) =

English Chinese-language translator and diplomat

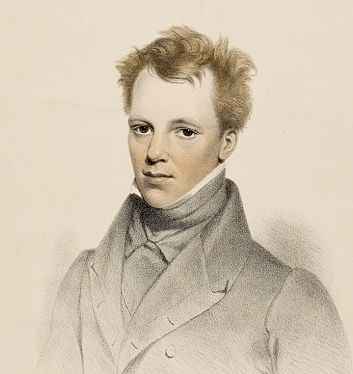
Lithograph of Thom

Robert Thom (simplified Chinese: 罗伯聃; traditional Chinese: 羅伯聃; pinyin: Luóbódān; 1807 – 14 September 1846) was an English nineteenth century Chinese language translator and diplomat based in Canton (modern day Guangzhou) who worked for the trading house Jardine, Matheson & Co. and was seconded to the British armed forces during the First Opium War (1839 – 1842). For his literary works Thom used Sloth as a nom de plume.

== Life ==
Thom worked in the piece goods department of Jardine, Matheson & Co. where he acquired a knowledge of the Chinese language.

When hostilities began between the British and the ruling Chinese Qing dynasty in late 1839, Thom, along with other Chinese translators including John Robert Morrison and Karl Gützlaff provided the necessary language interface between the warring factions. In July 1840, during the First Opium War, Thom sailed north from Canton aboard HMS Blonde as translator to Captain Thomas Bourchier. The ship anchored outside Namoy (modern day Kinmen, formerly also known as Quemoy) to deliver a letter from British Foreign Secretary Lord Palmerston laying out demands for the opening of China to foreign trade. After Bourchier noticed cannons being mounted on a nearby fort, Thom rowed towards the shore in a small boat carrying a placard warning that if the ship was fired on, Bourchier would retaliate. A number of Chinese from a mob gathered on the shore swam towards Thom's boat and he narrowly missed being hit by an arrow and musket fire as he shouted out the warning written on the placard. Bourchier made good on his promise and shelled the fort and nearby warships before eventually withdrawing. In 1841, Thom assisted the British during the expedition up the Broadway River from Macao to Canton. He later served as British Consul in Ningpo where he died on 14 September 1846.

== Literary works ==
Thom produced an 1840 Chinese translation of Aesop's Fables and was said to be one of the very few westerners who spoke the Beijing dialect of Mandarin Chinese very well. He also translated the Ming dynasty Chinese story The Lasting resentment of Miss Keaou Lwan Wang, a Chinese Tale and wrote several text books for students of the Chinese language.

== Bibliography ==
- The Lasting Resentment of Miss Keaou Lwan Wang, a Chinese Tale. Canton Press Office. 1839.
- Esop's Fables Written in Chinese by the Learned Mun Mooy Seen-Shang. Canton Press Office. 1840.
- Chinese and English Vocabulary, compiled chiefly with a view to facilitate intercourse in the Northern ports. Part 1. Canton. 1843.
- The Chinese Speaker or Extracts from Works Written in the Mandarin Language, as Spoken at Peking. Ningpo: Presbyterian Mission Press. 1846.
