= Raid on Chesconessex Creek =

British naval attack on the United States during the War of 1812

- Part of the War of 1812
Date	June 25, 1814
Location	Chesconessex Creek, Virginia 37.755°N 75.776°W
Result	British victory

Belligerents
United Kingdom	United States

Commanders and leaders
George Urmston; James Scott	John G. Joynes

Strength
Several hundred marines and sailors	Garrison of one fort (Unknown amount of Virginia militia)
- Location within Virginia

On June 25, 1814, a British maritime force landed at Chesconessex Creek, Virginia, to attack an American fort. The British forces, several hundred Royal Marines, Colonial Marines and sailors, landed from Royal Navy vessels Albion, Dragon and Endymion. They were commanded by Lieutenant George Urmston of the Albion. The commander of the first British landing boat, Lieutenant James Scott, had requested permission to attack the fort as the commander of its Virginia militia garrison, Captain John G. Joynes, had previously threatened to "blow [him] to hell" if he attempted it.

The British were assisted by a guide, one of Joynes' slaves who had escaped. They landed close to the fort which fired one round from its six-pounder cannon before the garrison fled. Scott took items of Joynes' uniform and his sword as trophies. Before the British withdrew to their ships, taking the captured cannon, they destroyed the fort and some nearby guardhouses.

== Background ==
Britain and the United States had been at war since 1812, when American forces launched an ultimately unsuccessful invasion of the British colony of Canada. Since 1813 the Royal Navy had carried out a campaign in Chesapeake Bay, raiding the shorelines of Virginia and Maryland. The raids targeted public buildings and supplies in a hope of diverting American troops from the Canada front and persuading U.S. civilians to advocate for peace at a time when British forces were engaged in the Napoleonic Wars. A peace treaty between Britain and France was signed on April 11, 1814, releasing resources for the American war.

An American log-and-earth fort had been established at Chesconessex Creek on Chesapeake Bay. It was armed with a single six-pounder cannon and commanded by Captain John G. Joynes, who led an artillery company attached to the 2nd Regiment of Virginia militia. Joynes had served throughout the war and in 1813 was recommended for promotion and command of an intended battalion of artillery by Virginia congressman Thomas M. Bayly. Many of the raids in the Chesapeake Bay had been led by Royal Navy Lieutenant James Scott. Joynes was outraged by the raids and, during a visit to HMS Albion under a flag of truce, he warned Scott that he would "blow you to hell if you put your foot within a mile of my command ... I would give you such a whipping as would cure you from rambling at night". Scott saw this as a challenge and gained the permission of his commander, Rear Admiral George Cockburn, for a raid to be made against Joynes' post.

== Raid ==
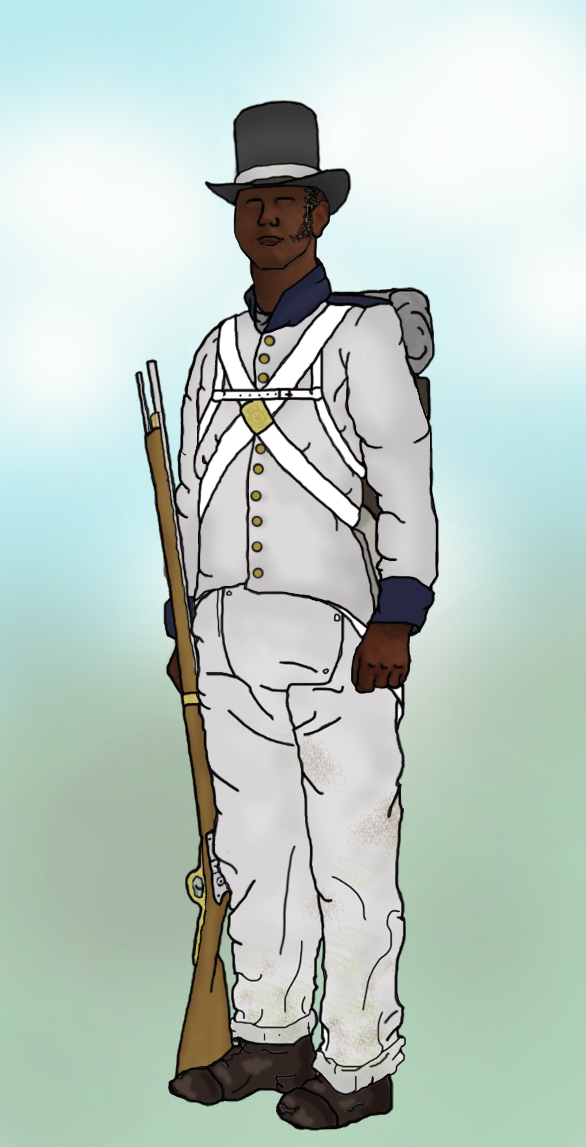
Depiction of a Colonial Marine

Scott had scouted the area around the fort before the raid and on 25 June commanded the lead British boat, directed by a local guide who was one of Joynes' escaped slaves. Other runaway slaves who had joined the Corps of Colonial Marines formed part of Scott's force. The runaways formed an important part of the British force; their knowledge of American positions and the local landscape allowed the British to raid further inland than otherwise would have been possible. The overall command of the British force was with Lieutenant George Urmston, first lieutenant of the Albion. The British troops comprised several hundred sailors, Royal Marines and Colonial Marines from Albion, Dragon and Endymion. Joynes' battery was manned by a force of the Accomac Shire militia.

Favourable wind and wave conditions allowed the British to approach the fort undetected by cover of night. Scott's boat landed at 1:30 a.m., on the shore around 0.25 miles (0.40 km) in front of the fort, which opened fire at point blank range with its six-pounder cannon to no effect. With drawn sword, Scott led his marines in a charge over the ramparts, catching the Americans by surprise. Other British forces worked around the rear of the fort. The American garrison broke and ran almost immediately, Joynes being seen by Scott to run away unarmed and clothed only in his sleeping shirt and boots. Scott formed a group of his marines into line at the fort's entrance, but was only able to fire one significant musket volley before the Americans disappeared into the forest.

The British troops dismounted the American cannon, which was taken back to the fleet, and destroyed the fort. Scott took Joynes' hat, coat, and sword from his office as trophies. A number of American guard houses in the area were also burnt.

== Aftermath ==
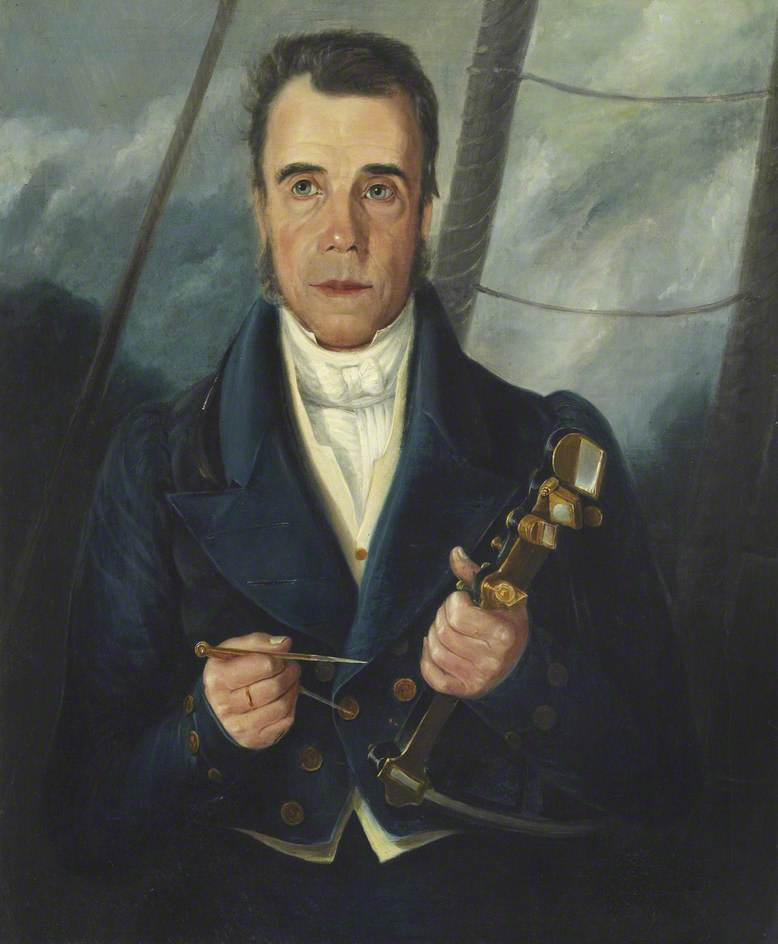
Scott as a captain

Cockburn reported the raid to his superior Vice Admiral Alexander Cochrane by letter on 25 June, enclosing a report by Urmston. Cockburn noted that it was the third American battery and second gun captured by his forces in shoreline raids since 9 May. The raid was a complete success, removing the threat posed by the fort and disheartening local American forces. The raid, together with the Ocracoke raid of 1813 and the Pongoteague raid of 30 May 1814, helped develop the Colonial Marines' reputation as enthusiastic, obedient and effective troops. They went on to serve in the August Battle of Bladensburg and Burning of Washington, the US capital.

Scott gave the clothing he had captured from Joynes to a black sergeant of the Colonial Marines, eliciting a letter of complaint from the American that he had allowed them to be worn by "a G[o]d d[amne]d black nigger". Joynes went on to become colonel and commander of the 2nd Regiment of Virginia Militia.

Urmston was promoted to commander on Cockburn's recommendation for good service in the American theatre in 1814, and he remained in this rank at death in Dieppe, France, in 1820. Scott went on to serve as aide-de-camp to Cockburn during his land campaign and was present at Bladensburg and Washington. He was mentioned in dispatches ten times during the war and went on to command ships in the First Opium War and ended his career as an admiral and knight commander of the Order of the Bath.
