= Anthony Stransham =

British general (1805–1900)

General Sir Anthony Stransham GCB
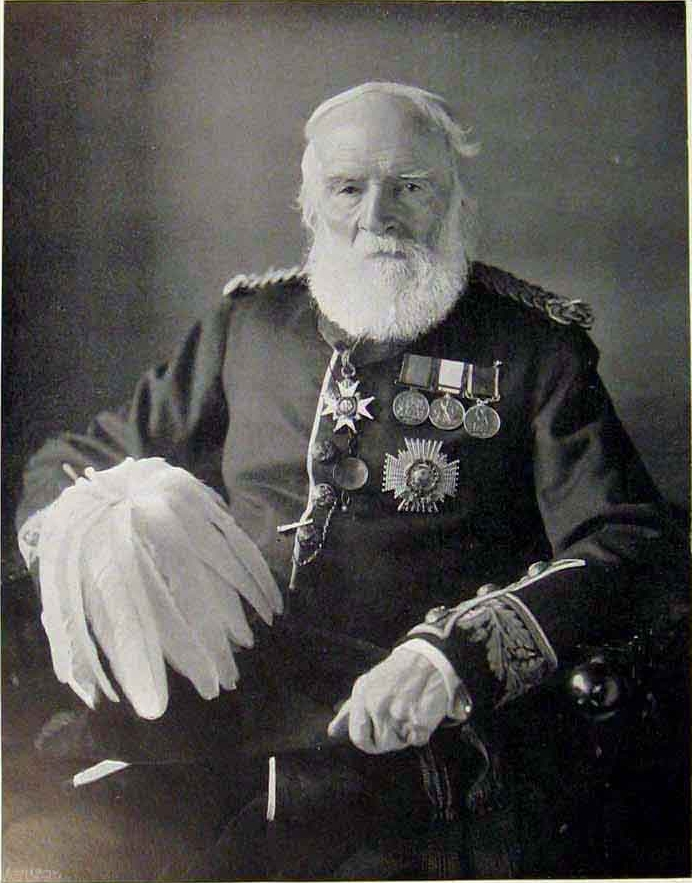
- Sir Anthony Stransham in June 1896
- Born: Anthony Blaxland Stransham; 22 December 1805; Antingham, Norfolk, England
- Died: 6 October 1900 (aged 94); Ealing, London, England
- Military career
- Allegiance: United Kingdom
- Branch: Royal Marines
- Service years: 1823–1875
- Rank: General
- Conflicts: Greek War of Independence: Battle of Navarino; First Opium War; Crimean War
- Awards: Knight Grand Cross of the Order of the Bath

General Sir Anthony Blaxland Stransham GCB (22 December 1805 – 6 October 1900) was a senior British officer in the Royal Marines. He was one of the navy generals of the attack in The Battle of Canton, which was a British victory.

== Background ==
Stransham was the son of Lieutenant Colonel Anthony Stransham of the Royal Marines, and grandson of Major Samuel Stransham, also of the Royal Marines.

== Military career ==
Stransham entered the Royal Marines on 1 January 1823. Four years after entering the service, he was present as a subaltern at the Battle of Navarino on 20 October 1827. Stransham led the Royal Marines during the First Battle of Canton in the First Opium War on 18 March 1841. He was wounded and promoted to captain. He was awarded the Baltic Medal, having been with Charles John Napier in 1854. From 1862 to 1867, General Stransham was Inspector-General of the Royal Marines.

Later in his career, as a general, the "Grand Old Man of the Army" became a Knight Grand Cross of the Order of the Bath.

He saw active service for over 53 years, retiring with the rank of general on 24 December 1875.
