= Porcher (1799 ship) =

British East India Company ship

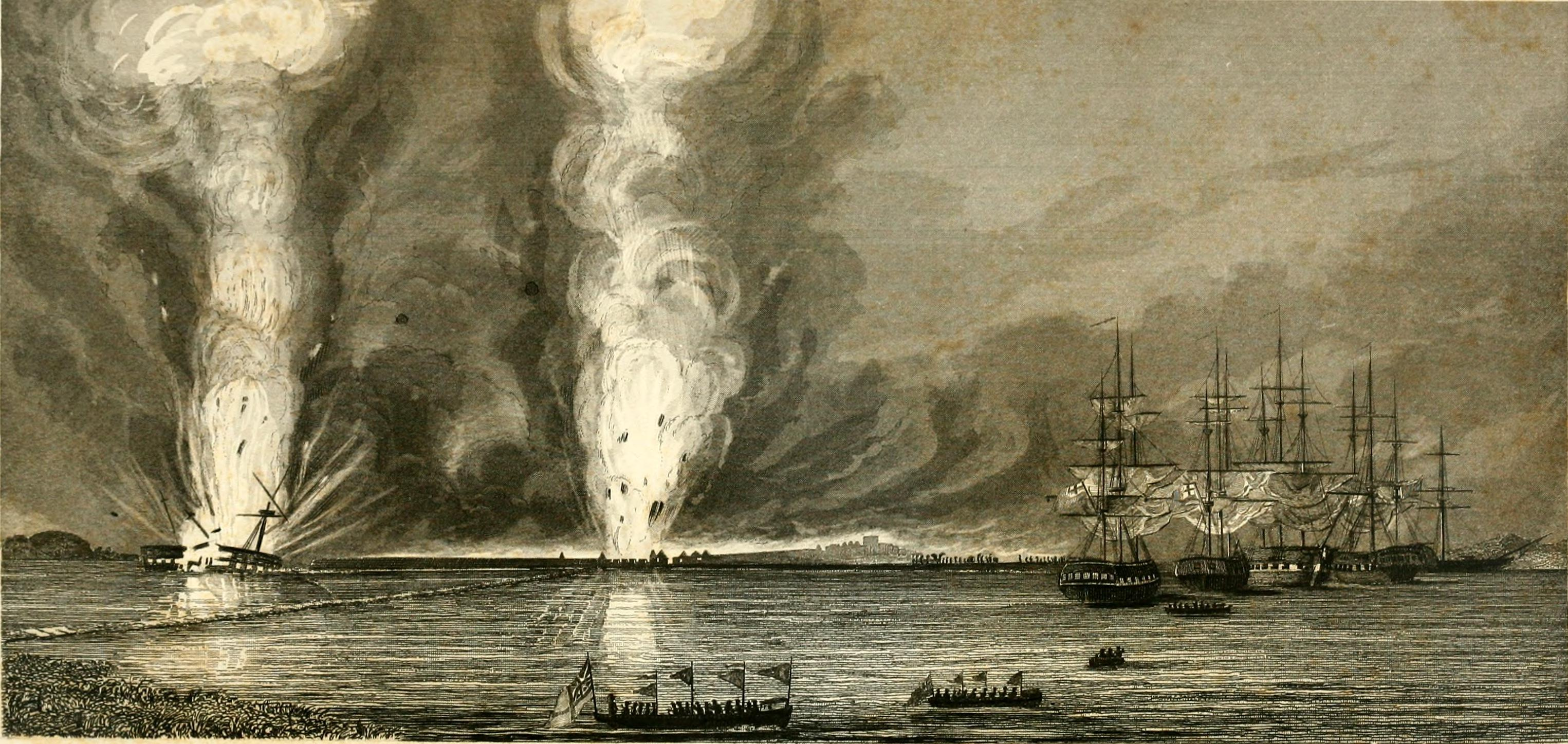
- Porcher's (left) magazine detonating after an engagement with a Royal Navy squadron during the First Opium War.

History

Great Britain
- Name: Porcher
- Namesake: East India agent Josias Porcher.
- Owner: 1800:Benjamin Blake; 1810:Lestock Wilson; 1812: George Palmer; 1818:Thomas Heath
- Builder: Gillett, Larkins & Co., Calcutta
- Launched: 24 December 1799
- Captured: 24 February 1802

France
- Name: Ville de Bordeaux
- Acquired: By capture; condemned in prize in 1803
- Captured: 1804

United Kingdom
- Name: Porcher
- Acquired: By purchase
- Renamed: Cambridge (1810)
- Fate: Sold c.1840

United States
- Name: Chesapeake
- Namesake: Chesapeake Bay
- Acquired: c.1840 by purchase
- Fate: Sold c.1841

Qing China
- Name: Cambridge (alias Chesapeake)
- Acquired: By purchase c.1841
- Fate: Destroyed in battle in February 1841

General characteristics
- Tons burthen: 759, 75971/94 or 761, or 768, or 77271/94 (bm)
- Length: 141 ft 0 in (43.0 m) (overall); 114 ft 4 3/4 in (34.9 m) (keel)
- Beam: 35 ft 4 in (10.8 m)
- Depth of hold: 14 ft 1 in (4.3 m)
- Propulsion: Sail
- Complement: 1811:80; c.1813:70
- Armament: 1800:12 × 6-pounder guns; 1811:20 × 12&9-pounder guns; c.1813:18 × 12&6-pounder guns; c.1840:28 × 6-pounder + 4 × 12-pounder guns + 6 carronades
- Notes: Teak-built; three decks

Porcher was launched in 1799 at Calcutta. She made one voyage for the British East India Company (EIC) from Bengal to England. A French privateer captured her in 1802, which gave rise to a case in French courts about the validity of the capture given the impending Treaty of Amiens. The French courts condemned her in prize and new owners in Bordeaux named her Ville de Bordeaux. The British recaptured her in 1804. Thereafter she traded between England and India as a licensed ship. In 1809 she sailed to England where in 1810 new owners renamed her Cambridge. As Cambridge she made three voyages for the EIC as an extra ship. In 1818 she was again sold with her new owners continuing to sail her to the Far East as a licensed ship. She then made two more voyages to India for the EIC. In 1840 she was sold to an American trading house at Canton, and then to the Qing Dynasty, which purchased her for the Imperial Chinese Navy. The British Royal Navy destroyed her on 27 February 1841 during the Battle of First Bar at the onset of the First Opium War.

== Porcher ==
Captain Benjamin Blake sailed Porcher from Calcutta on 5 February 1800. On 17 February she passed Kedgeree. She reached Madras on 31 March and St Helena on 24 June. She arrived at the Downs on 23 September.

Porcher entered Lloyd's Register in the supplemental pages to the 1800 issue. It shows B. Blake as owner and master, her origin as Calcutta, and trade as London-India. Porcher was admitted to registry in Great Britain on 21 January 1801.

On 28 January 1801 Blake sailed Porcher for Calcutta. She left Calcutta on 18 February 1802 for England. On the way, the French privateer Bellone intercepted her on 24 February 1802 and captured her. Porcher arrived at Île de France on 9 April as a prize to Bellone.

In August, an American ship brought letters reporting that Bellona had captured Porcher in the Bay of Bengal. Furthermore, though both captor and captive had copies of the "Preliminaries of Peace", the expectation was that Porcher and her cargo would be condemned. Lloyd's List reported on 13 August that Bellona had captured Porcher, Tay, and Highland Chief. (Note: The master of Highland Chief was reported to have been killed on 30 March when a boarding party from Bellone captured her.)

In June 1802, Earl Cornwallis sailed to Île de France having on board a number of French prisoners, who had been detained in Bengal. The prisoners were under the charge of Mr. Campbell, whom the Bengal Government had also charged with negotiating with the Governor of Île de France for the release of Tay, Highland Chief, and Porcher. The vessels and their cargoes were estimated to be worth £100,000.

Blake and the master of Tay protested the seizures. Lloyd's List reported on 28 December 1802 that Highland Chief, Porcher, and Tay had been condemned.

Porcher arrived at Bordeaux on 18 February 1803. There she was again condemned and sold to local buyers who named her Ville de Bordeaux. In 1804 the British recaptured her and she reverted to the name Porcher. She then continued in private trade in India.

In 1809 she sailed to England. In March 1810 Porcher sold some lots of ebony wood that remained unclaimed in the EIC’s warehouse in London and that in 1817 the EIC stated that it would sell if not immediately reclaimed.

In London new owners renamed her Cambridge. In London, Pitcher & Co. measured her in 1810 for charter to the EIC. (Note: The British Library directory reports that Pitcher built Cambridge, but this is clearly incorrect. All other records for the vessel have her being built in Bengal in 1799 or 1800.) Cambridge was admitted to the registry of Great Britain on 30 May 1810.

== Cambridge ==
On Friday 9 October 1810, the EIC chartered Cambridge from "Lestock Wilson, Esq." for one voyage at a rate of £33 7s 6d per ton (burthen).

On 1 March 1811 Captain Charles Morlock received a letter of marque against the French for Cambridge. Mortlock sailed Cambridge from Torbay on 12 May, bound for Madras and Bengal. She reached Madeira on 2 June, and Madras on 26 September. She arrived at Diamond Harbour on 13 November. Homeward bound, she passed Saugor on 4 January 1812 and reached St Helena on 12 May. She arrived at Long Reach on 27 July.

Captain James Toussaint received letter of marque №284 against America. Under his command, Cambridge left China on 15 March 1815, reached St Helena on 5 July, and arrived at the Downs in September.

Captain John Freeman sailed Cambridge from Plymouth on 20 March 1816, bound for China. She reached St Helena on 28 May, and Batavia on 5 September. She arrived at Whampoa on 29 October. Homeward-bound, she crossed the Second Bar on 22 January 1817, reached St Helena on 10 April, and arrived at Long Reach on 8 June.

In 1818 Thomas Heath purchased Cambridge for use as a licensed ship sailing to the Far East. (Note: Although one source has her transporting convicts to Australia, the convict transport was a different Cambridge. That Cambridge was of c.536 tons (bm), launched in 1825 at Prince Edward Island.e)

The table below uses data from Lloyd's Register and the Register of Shipping. It is clearly inaccurate in many details. The entries were only as accurate as owners chose to keep them.

Between 1825 and 1827 Cambridge made two more voyages for the EIC, both one-way.

On 1 June 1825 Captain James Barber sailed Cambridge from Portsmouth, bound for Bombay. She arrived there on 13 October.

Captain James Barber sailed from Plymouth on 6 July 1826, bound for Madras and Bengal. Cambridge reached Madras on 8 November and Penang on 23 December. She arrived at Kedgeree on 19 January 1827.

Year	Master	Owner	Trade
1818	Toussaint	Palmer & Co.	London-India
1820	Toussaint	Palmer & Co.	London-Bombay
1825	Barber	Palmer & Co.	London-Bengal
1830	Barber	Palmer & Co.	London-Bengal
1835		J. Barber	
1840	Douglas	T. Heath & Co.	London

== Chinese warship ==
Cambridge is no longer listed in Lloyd's Register after 1840. The reason is that Douglas sailed her from Bombay to Canton with a cargo of opium and cotton. On the way he stopped at Singapore and purchased twenty-eight 6-pounder and four 12-pounder guns to add to the six carronades that she already carried.

At Canton, Douglas convinced Charles Elliot, the chief superintendent at Canton, to charter Cambridge as a de facto warship to protect British shipping in the Pearl River delta. As soon as he could, Elliot ended the hire of Cambridge.

An American trading house in Canton purchased Cambridge, and renamed her Chesapeake. However, Elliot had insisted that Douglas ship her guns back to India before he sold her.

The Americans then sold Chesapeake at the onset of the First Opium War. The Qing Dynasty purchased her for the Imperial Chinese Navy. Because Cambridge/Chesapeake was unarmed, the Chinese armed her with a motley collection of local guns.

== Fate ==
On 27 February 1841 a British Royal Navy flotilla sailed up the Pearl River and attacked Chinese artillery batteries on First Bar Island. Cambridge and a fleet of Chinese War Junks sailed out of Canton to counter them.

In the ensuing Battle of First Bar, Cambridge engaged the British, but her crew abandoned her when British cannon fire overwhelmed her. Seamen and marines from HMS Calliope boarded Cambridge and set her on fire. Eventually the ship's magazine detonated, creating a sound so loud British dispatches reported that it "must have been heard in Canton."
