= Gordon Bremer =

British naval officer (1786–1850)

Rear-Admiral Sir Gordon Bremer KCB KCH
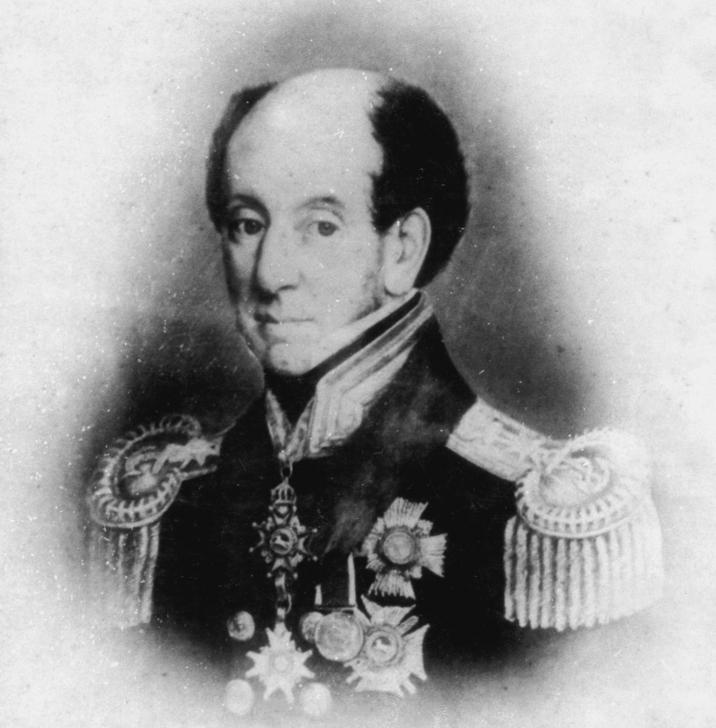
- Born: James John Gordon Bremer; 26 September 1786; Portsea, Hampshire, England
- Died: 14 February 1850 (aged 63); Tunbridge Wells, Kent, England
- Military career
- Allegiance: United Kingdom of Great Britain and Ireland
- Branch: Royal Navy
- Service years: 1802–1850
- Rank: Rear-Admiral of the Blue
- Commands: East Indies and China Station
- Wars: Napoleonic Wars; First Anglo-Burmese War; Battle of Berbera; First Anglo-Chinese War
- Awards: CB (1815); KCH (1836); KCB (1841); China War Medal (1842)

Signature
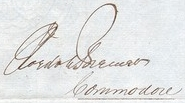

Sir James John Gordon Bremer KCB KCH (26 September 1786 – 14 February 1850) was a British Royal Navy officer. He served in the Napoleonic Wars against France, the First Anglo-Burmese War in Burma, and the First Opium War in China.

Born in Portsea, Portsmouth, Bremer joined the Royal Naval College as a student in 1797. He became a midshipman in 1802, serving in the North Sea, then qualified as a lieutenant in 1805. The first ship he commanded was HMS Rattlesnake in 1807, stationed in the East Indies. He was promoted to post captain in 1814. After becoming commander of HMS Tamar, in 1824 he was sent to Melville Island, Australia, to establish a colony. Under his leadership, the north coast of Australia from 129° to 135° longitude was claimed as British territory. The colony was abandoned in 1828. He led British forces at the Battle of Berbera in 1827, a successful raid against tribes in the Horn of Africa.

As a commodore, Bremer was the temporary commander-in-chief of British forces in the First Opium War, for two periods between 1839 and 1841. In 1841, he took possession of Hong Kong Island for the United Kingdom. From 1846 to 1848, he was joint commander (with Francis Augustus Collier) of the Channel Squadron and superintendent of Woolwich Dockyard. He retired in 1848, with the rank of rear admiral, and died in 1850.

== Early career ==
Bremer was born on 26 September 1786 in Portsea, Hampshire, England. He was the only son of Royal Navy Lieutenant James Bremer (who went missing in the East Indiaman Halswell off the coast of Dorset, England, on 6 January 1786) and his wife Ann, daughter of Captain James Norman. In 1794 at around 12 years old he joined the Royal Navy as a first-class volunteer on board HMS Sandwich, the flagship of Rear-Admiral Skeffington Lutwidge, at the Nore, from which he was discharged in June 1795. On 8 October 1797, he became a student of the Royal Naval College in Portsmouth, and re-embarked on 2 April 1802 as a midshipman on board HMS Endymion under Captain Philip Durham. Until July 1805, Bremer served in the flagship of Vice-Admiral James Gambier and Rear-Admiral Edward Thornbrough, HMS Isis, on the Newfoundland and North Sea stations. Shortly after passing his examination, he was appointed sub-lieutenant of the gun-brig HMS Rapid. On 3 August 1805, he became a lieutenant on board HMS Captain as part of William Cornwallis' force pursuing a French fleet at Brest.

On 9 May 1806, Bremer was appointed to HMS Diana commanded by Captain Thomas James Maling in the Mediterranean Station, from where he proceeded to the Davis Strait. On 6 October, he served on board HMS Imogen, commanded by Captain Thomas Garth in the Mediterranean. On 28 May 1807, he was appointed to HMS Psyché commanded by Captain William Wooldridge in the East Indies, where he became commander of HMS Rattlesnake on 13 October. He became a post captain on 7 June 1814. On 4 June 1815, he was nominated a Companion of the Most Honourable Military Order of the Bath (CB).

== Australia ==
On 18 September 1823, just before his 37th birthday, Bremer was appointed commander of HMS Tamar. In February 1824, he was sent to Melville Island, Australia, to establish a colony. The site was intended as a military settlement to secure British trade in the region. It was hoped that a market would open to British merchants in the Malay Archipelago. In June 1824, Bremer arrived in Sydney where he spent a month collecting troops and stores. On 24 August 1824, he left Port Jackson, Sydney, on board Tamar, accompanied by Countess of Harcourt and Lady Nelson. The ships transported Royal Marines and 44 convicts guarded by the 3rd Regiment. After sailing through the Torres Strait, he arrived in Port Essington on 20 September. The north coast of Australia from 129° to 135° longitude was declared British territory. Bremer rejected Port Essington as a settlement due to its lack of fresh drinking water. On 26 September, the party landed at King Cove in Melville Island to build a settlement, which was named Fort Dundas on 21 October. However, the site was unhealthy, expensive to maintain, and did not develop into an advantageous commercial trading post. In November 1828, orders were given to abandon the post.

In November 1824, Bremer sailed for India where he served in the First Anglo-Burmese War. On 25 January 1836, he was made a Knight Commander of the Royal Hanoverian Guelphic Order (KCH). In 1837, Port Essington was again selected as a possible trading station by Baron Glenelg. Bremer, who commanded the Alligator and Britomart, was again given charge of the expedition. He established a new post in October 1838, calling it Port Victoria. The port was active until 1843 and by 1849, Port Essington was abandoned after it had no commercial or military value. Under the encouragement of New South Wales Governor George Gipps, Bremer left Port Essington for China in June 1839, with the ships under his command, after news of trouble in the Chinese city of Canton.

== China ==
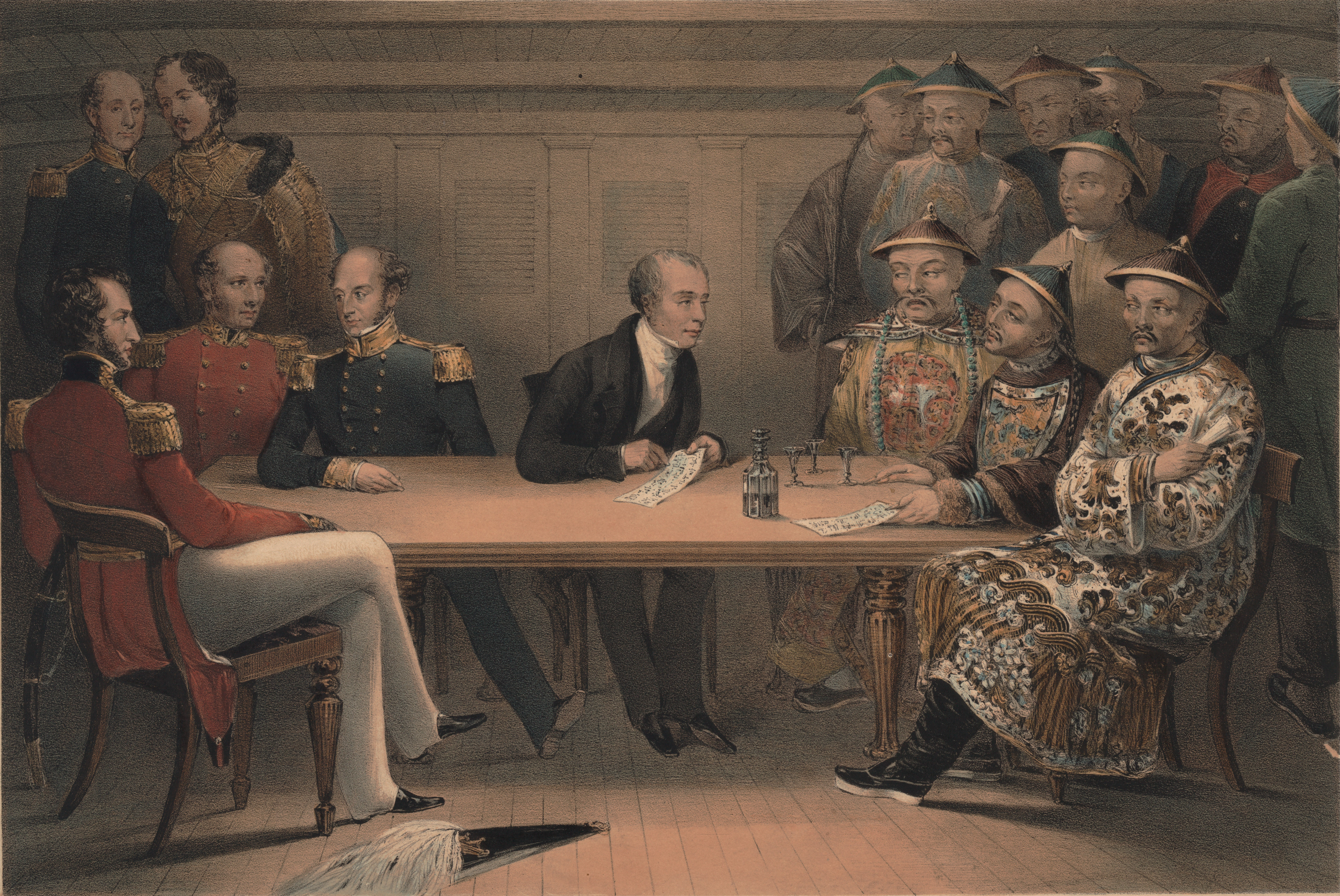
Bremer (left of centre) on board HMS Wellesley with Chinese officials on 4 July 1840, a day before the capture of Chusan

Rear-Admiral Frederick Maitland, commander of the East Indies and China Station, died in November 1839. As the senior naval officer, Bremer took over as commander-in-chief of British forces in the First Anglo-Chinese War as commodore. He was replaced by Rear-Admiral George Elliot in July 1840, but after Elliot's return home in November 1840, Bremer again assumed the post until the arrival of Sir William Parker in August 1841. Bremer commanded the capture of Chusan (5–6 July 1840), Second Battle of Chuenpi (7 January 1841), Battle of the Bogue (23–26 February), Battle of First Bar (27 February), Battle of Whampoa (2 March), and Battle of Canton (18 March).

After Plenipotentiary Charles Elliot declared the cession of Hong Kong Island to the United Kingdom on 20 January 1841, Bremer reported on 26 January that he "proceeded to Hong Kong, and took formal possession of the island in Her Majesty's name, and hoisted the colours on it, with the usual salutes and ceremonies." This area became known as Possession Point, and this date is considered as the modern foundation of Hong Kong.

On 1 February, he issued a joint proclamation with Elliot to the inhabitants, declaring the island British territory. On 24 August, he left China aboard the Atlanta with Elliot. For his services, Bremer received a vote of thanks from both houses of parliament, and on 29 July, he was made a Knight Commander of the Most Honourable Military Order of the Bath (KCB).

== Later career ==
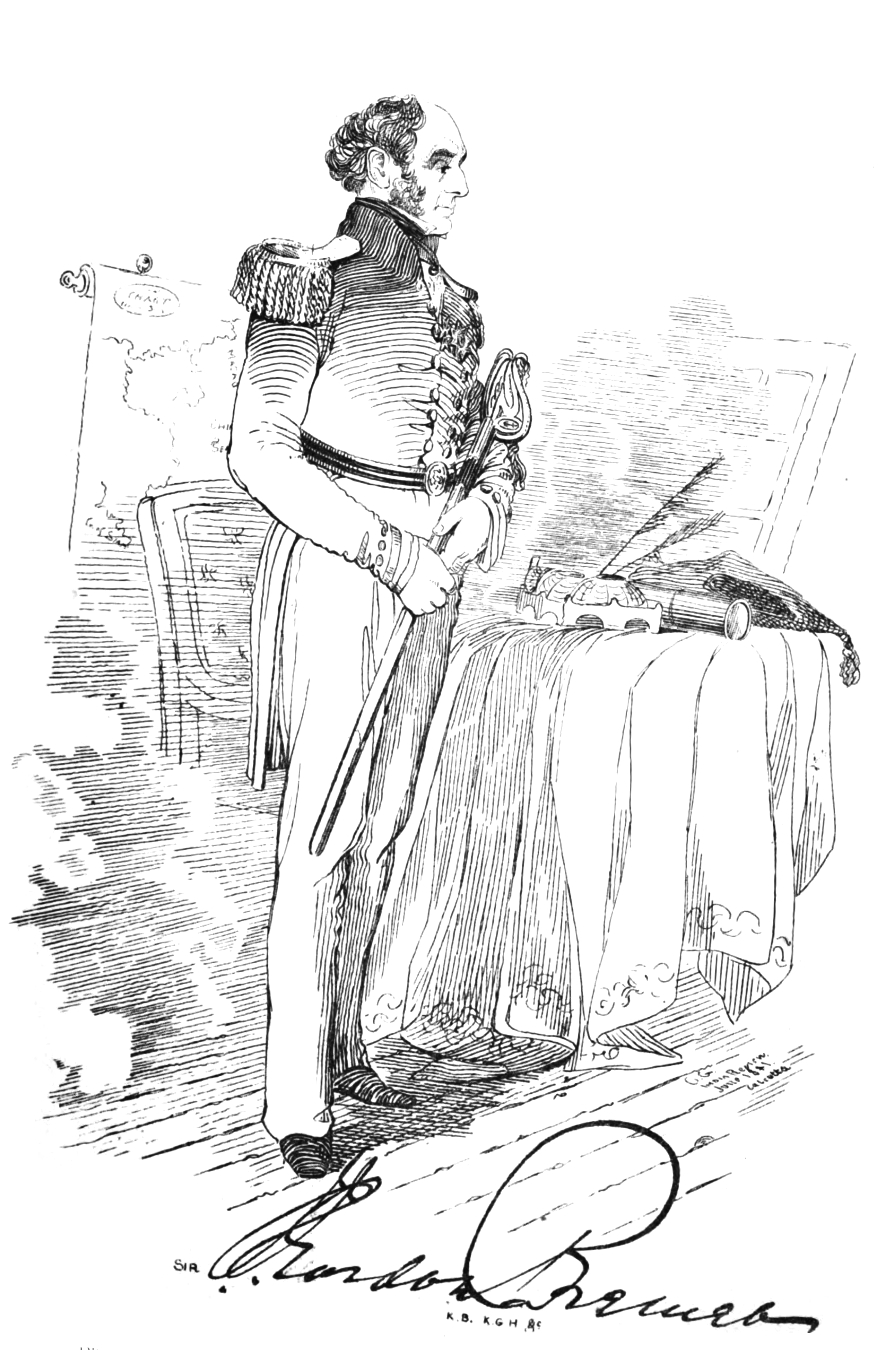
Portrait by Colesworthy Grant

On 30 April 1846, Bremer was appointed, jointly with Sir Francis Augustus Collier, to the command of the Channel Squadron, with his broad pennant on board HMS Queen. In November 1842, he became commodore-superintendent of the Woolwich Dockyard, where he commanded the yacht William and Mary. He retired from the dockyard on 13 November 1848. On 15 September 1849, Bremer was appointed to Rear-Admiral of the Blue. He served as a magistrate in Devonshire. He died of diabetes mellitus on 14 February 1850 at Tunbridge Wells, Kent, England.

== Family ==
On 27 March 1811, Bremer married Harriet, daughter of Royal Marines officer Thomas Wheeler and widow of Reverend George Glasse. They had two sons and four daughters:

- Emma Margaret (c. 1815 – 19 July 1877); married Royal Navy officer Augustus Kuper on 20 June 1837
- Isabel Harriet Ann (c. 1816 – 13 April 1866); married British Army officer Henry Sabine Browne on 26 February 1840 and have one daughter. After Browne's death in 1843, Isabel married Frederick George William Fearon on 29 December 1849 at Westminster, London and have one daughter.
- Emily (c. 1817 – 21 December 1869); married Alfred Howard on 5 April 1838
- Ellen Susan (born c. 1818); married British Army officer Collingwood Fenwick at Plymouth on 15 October 1844
- Edward Gordon (18 September 1819 – 7 April 1847); Royal Navy officer
- John de Courcy (17 February 1822 – 6 January 1891 in Rose Bay, Sydney, Australia)

After Harriet's death in 1846, Bremer married Jemima Mary Harriet (1801–1879), the eldest daughter of Royal Navy officer James Brisbane, on 8 February 1848 at Tunbridge Wells.

== Namesakes ==
- Bremer River, Queensland, Australia; first named Bremer's Creek by explorer John Oxley in 1828
- Bremer River, South Australia; originally the Hindmarsh River, renamed the Bremer River in 1839
- Bremer Bay, Western Australia; named by explorer John Septimus Roe, who served under Bremer on board the Tamar from 1824 to 1827
- Bremer Range and its highest peak, Mount Gordon, Western Australia; named by Roe
- Bremer Island, Northern Territory, Australia
- Bremer Street, Griffith, Canberra, Australia
- Mount Bremer; renamed Braemar Hill, Hong Kong

Military offices
Preceded by Sir Frederick Maitland	Commander-in-Chief, East Indies and China Station; January 1840 – July 1840	Succeeded by Sir George Elliot
Preceded by Sir George Elliot	Commander-in-Chief, East Indies and China Station; November 1840 – August 1841	Succeeded by Sir William Parker
