= Battle of Whampoa =

Coordinates: 23°5′46″N 113°23′50″E

- Part of the First Opium War
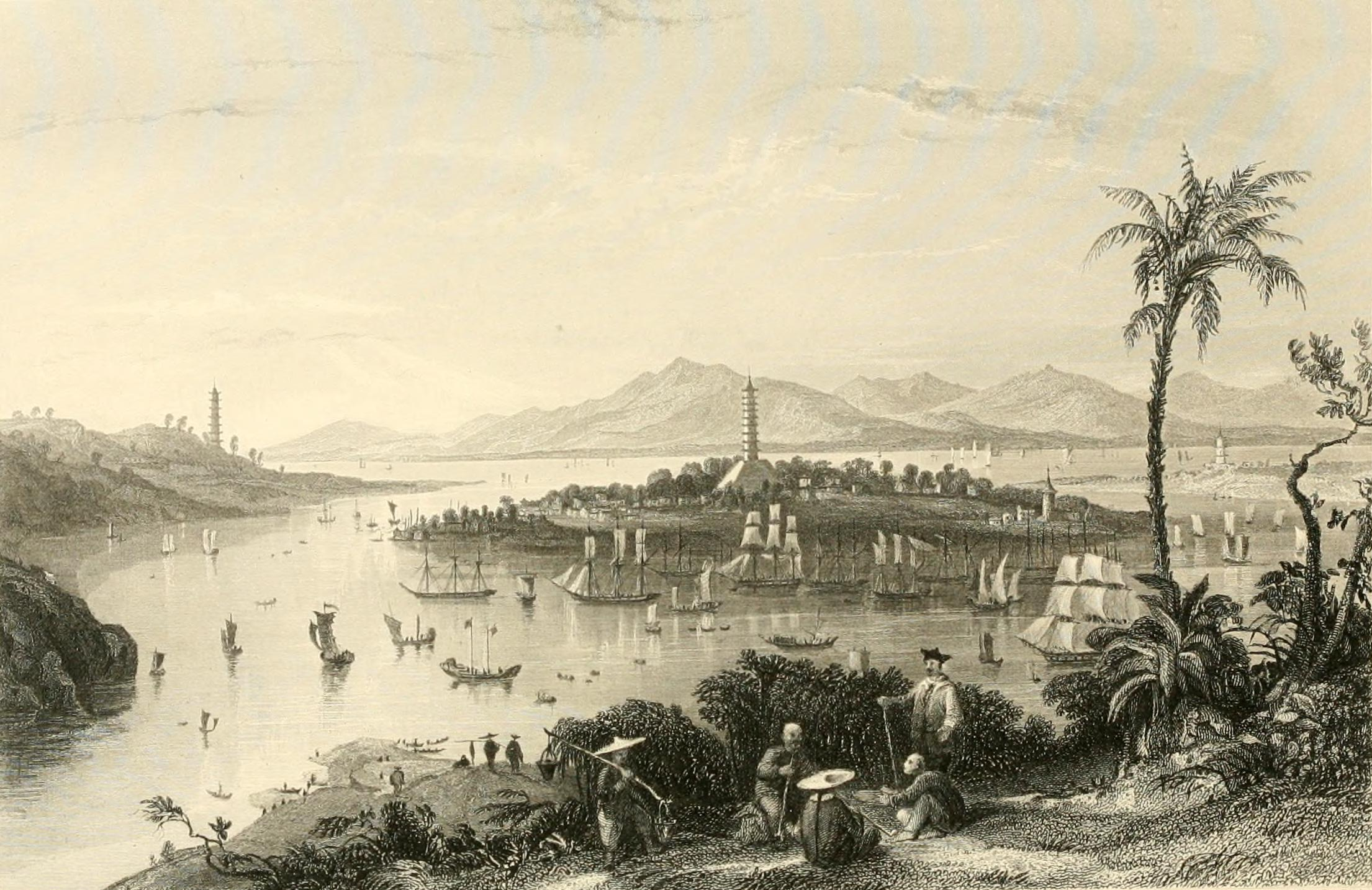
- View of Whampoa Island from Dane's Island
Date	2 March 1841
Location	Whampoa Island, Guangdong, China
Result	British victory

Belligerents
United Kingdom: British East India Company	Qing China

Commanders and leaders
Gordon Bremer; Edward Belcher	Unknown

Strength
1 ship of the line 2 corvettes 1 bomb ketch	250 troops 25 guns

Casualties and losses
1 killed	15–20 killed

The Battle of Whampoa was fought between British and Chinese forces at Whampoa Island (modern-day Pazhou Island) on the Pearl River near the city of Canton (Guangzhou), Guangdong, China, on 2 March 1841 during the First Opium War.

== Battle ==
On 2 March 1841, Commodore Gordon Bremer, commander-in-chief of British forces, sent Capt. Edward Belcher of the Sulphur to reconnoitre the Junk River. (Note: Junk River lies between Whampoa and Junk Island, a long narrow strip of land north-east of Whampoa.) The ship was towed by three of the Wellesley's boats under Lt. Richard Symonds. As they approached the northeast end of Whampoa Island, a Chinese battery of about 25 guns, which were masked by thick tree branches, opened fire on the ships. Lt. Symonds immediately cut the tow line, the boats sailed towards the shore and the boat crews landed. The battery was defended by 250 Manchu Tartar troops. They fled for shelter in the neighbouring jungle, but were dislodged by artillery from the Sulphur. After the British captured the forts, the guns were destroyed and the works and magazines blown up.

Bremer reported 15 or 20 Tartars killed. One British seaman from the Wellesley died from wounds after being shot through the lungs with grapeshot. Bremer resigned the command of the land forces to Maj. Gen. Hugh Gough, who joined the fleet on board the Cruizer. Former Imperial Commissioner Lin Zexu wrote in his diary entry for 2 March: "I hear that the English rebel ships have already forced their way to the fort at Lieh-te. Early in the morning I went to talk things over at the General Office in the Monastery of the Giant Buddha."

== Notes ==
Footnotes

Citations
