= HMS Modeste (1837) =

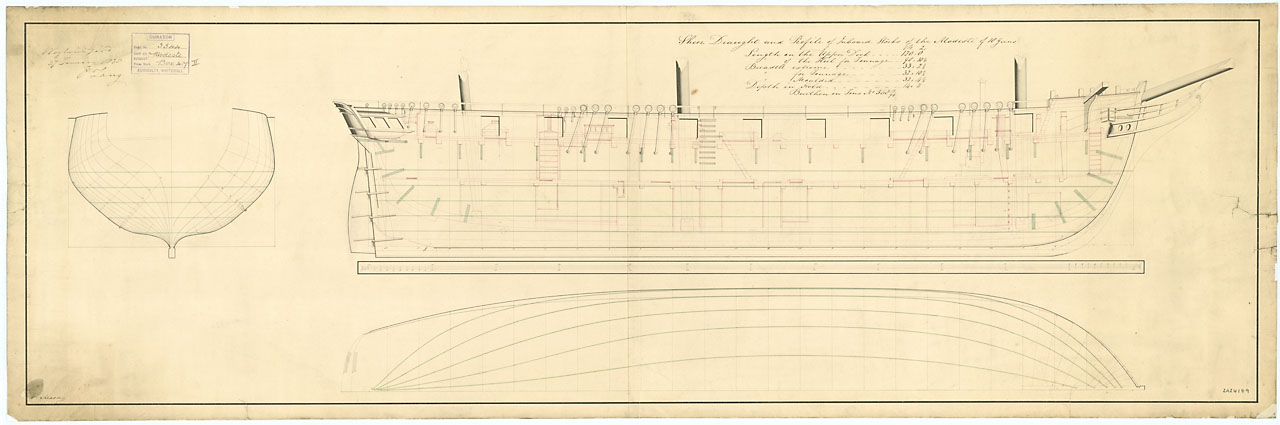
- Modeste

History

United Kingdom
- Name: HMS Modeste
- Ordered: 6 February 1837
- Builder: Woolwich Dockyard
- Cost: £15,042
- Laid down: May 1837
- Launched: 31 September 1837
- Commissioned: 10 March 1838
- Fate: Sold March 1866

General characteristics
- Class & type: Modeste-class corvette
- Tons burthen: 562 30/94 tons bm
- Length: 120 ft (36.6 m) (overall); 98 ft 7 in (30.0 m) (keel)
- Beam: 33 ft 1 in (10.1 m)
- Depth of hold: 14 ft 2 in (4.32 m)
- Propulsion: Sails
- Complement: 150
- Armament: 16 × 32-pounder carronades; 2 × 32-pounder guns

HMS Modeste was a British Royal Navy corvette commissioned in 1838 and sold in 1866.

== Operations ==
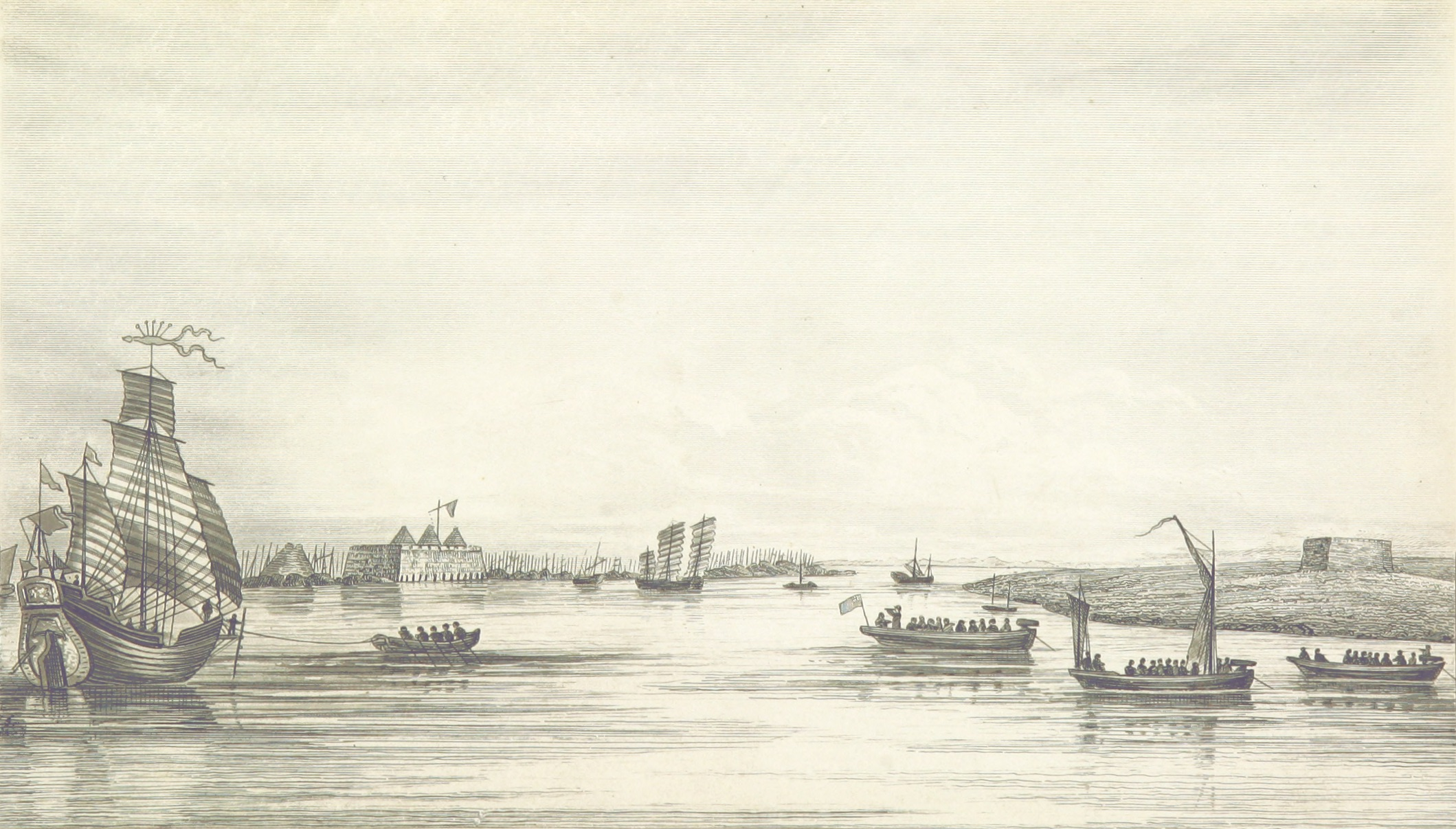
Mouth of the Peiho, from the pinnace of HMS Modeste, 11 August 1840.

The Modeste was a part of the British forces engaged in the First Opium War against the Qing Empire.
