= Battle of Canton (March 1841) =

British and Chinese battle in the First Opium War

Coordinates: 23.1104°N 113.2438°E

First Battle of Canton
- Part of First Opium War
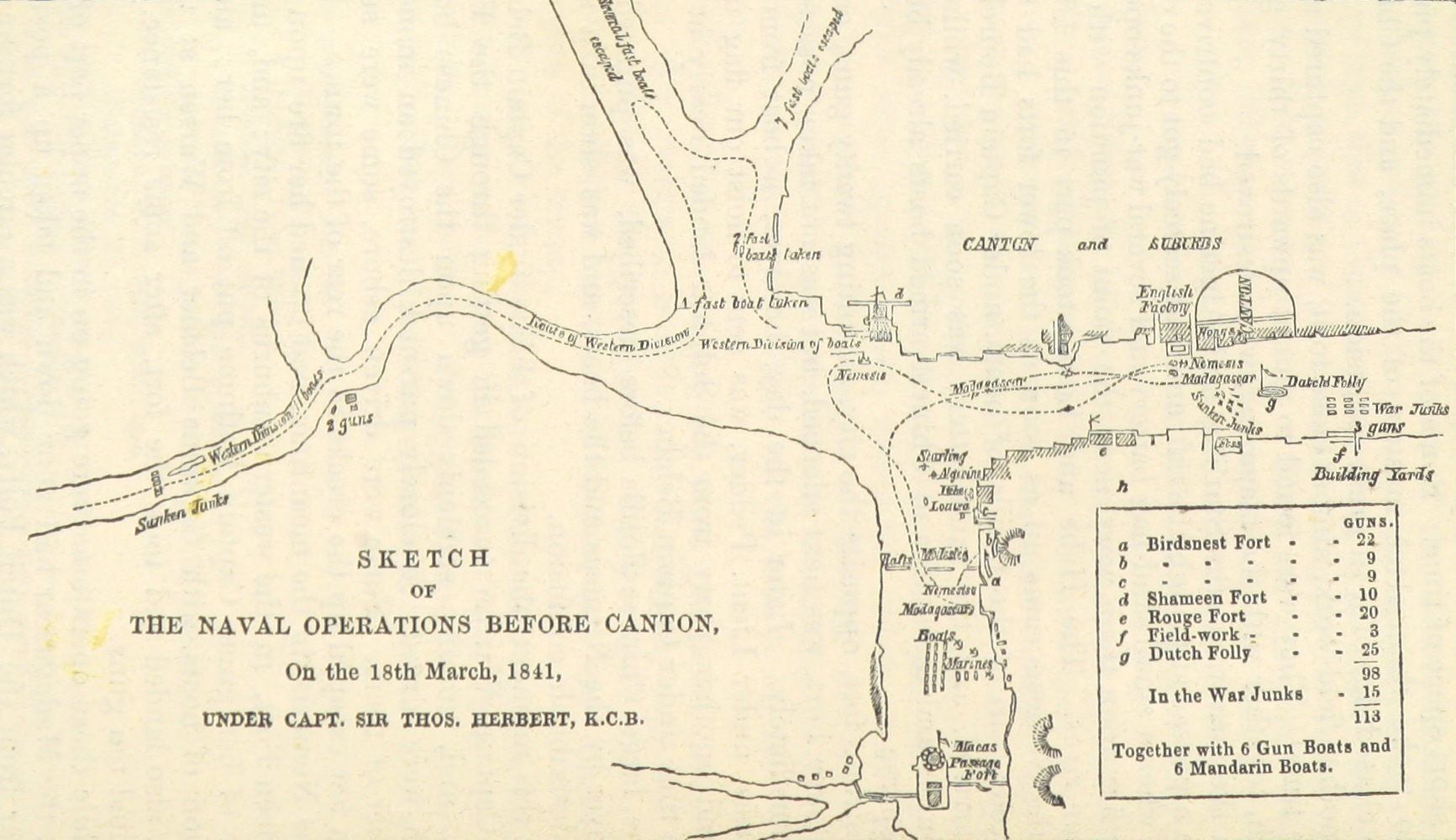
- Map of the naval operations at Canton, 18 March 1841
Date	18 March 1841
Location	Canton, Guangdong, China
Result	British victory

Belligerents
United Kingdom: British East India Company	Qing China

Commanders and leaders
Charles Elliot; Gordon Bremer; Thomas Herbert	Qishan; Yang Fang

Strength
9 ships	5 forts

Casualties and losses
7 killed	400 casualties 123 guns captured
- The official Chinese commander was Yishan, as a substitute for Qishan, but he had not reached Canton even by the time the battle ended.

The First Battle of Canton (Chinese: 第一次廣州之戰) was fought between British and Chinese forces in Canton, Guangdong Province, China, on 18 March 1841 during the First Opium War. The capture led to the hoisting of the Union Jack on the British factory in Canton and the resumption of trade between the British and the Chinese.

== Narrative ==
Following the Convention of Chuenpi in January 1841, which among other clauses ceded the island of Hong Kong to Great Britain, the furious Qing Daoguang Emperor fired Imperial Commissioner Qishan. In his place the emperor appointed his nephew Yishan as "General-pacifier of the Rebellious" (jìngnì 靖逆), with Lungwan (Long Wen, 隆文) and Yang Fang as ministerial attaches to assist him. On 20 March, British Plenipotentiary Charles Elliot announced the re-opening of trade after negotiations with Yang Fang as Lungwan and Yishan did not arrive in Canton until 14 April.

== Bibliography ==
- Bridgman, Elijah Coleman; Williams, Samuel Wells, eds. (1841), The Chinese Repository, vol. 10
- Bulletins and Other State Intelligence. Compiled and arranged from the official documents published in the London Gazette. Westminster: Printed by F. Watts. 1841.
- Hall, William Hutcheon; Bernard, William Dallas (1847). The Nemesis in China: Comprising a History of the Late War in that Country, with an Account of the Colony of Hong-Kong (3rd ed.). London: Henry Colburn.
- Waley, Arthur (2013) [First published 1958]. The Opium War Through Chinese Eyes. Taylor & Francis. ISBN 9781136576652.
