= List of ship launches in 1826 =

The list of ship launches in 1826 includes a chronological list of some ships launched in 1826.

Date	Ship	Class	Builder	Location	Country	Notes
4 January	Bradford	Steamship	Smith	Gainsborough	United Kingdom	For private owner.
7 January	William Wise	Brig	Worthington & Ashburner	Skerton	United Kingdom	For Messrs. John Winder & Co.
11 January	Falcon	Merchantman	Dikes and Gibson	Hull	United Kingdom	For W. Rooth, E. Thompson and T. Wharton.
23 January	Gunjava	Merchantman	J. Mackenzie	Sulkea	India	For private owner.
24 January	Herald	Schooner		Paihia	(United Kingdom of Great Britain and Ireland) New Zealand	For New Zealand Church Missionary Society.
26 January	Sulphur	Hecla-class bomb vessel		Chatham Dockyard	United Kingdom	For Royal Navy.
2 February	Dolphin	Steamship		Harwich	United Kingdom	For Post Office Packet Service.
3 February	Fingal	Steam yacht	W. Simons & Co.	Greenock	United Kingdom	For private owner.
9 February	The Norfolk	Schooner	Johnson	Walberswick	United Kingdom	For H. Ringwood.
11 February	Kingstown	Steamship	John Wilson	Chester, Cheshire	United Kingdom	For St George Steam Packet Company.
17 February	Albuera	Merchantman	Nichol Reid	Aberdeen	United Kingdom	For private owner.
23 February	Forth	Merchantman	Robert Menzies & Sons	Leith	United Kingdom	For Mr. Duncanson.
February	Vintage	Merchantman	E. & R. Lumsden	Sunderland	United Kingdom	For D. Simmons.
9 March	Lexington	Lexington-class sloop		New York Navy Yard	United States	For United States Navy.
12 March	Shannon	Steamship	Fletcher, Sons & Furnell	Limehouse	United Kingdom	For Dublin and London Steam Company.
17 March	Brechin Castle	Brig		Arbroath	United Kingdom	For private owner.
25 March	Manchester	Steamship	Dawson & Co	Liverpool	United Kingdom	For City of Dublin Company.
25 March	Meta	Brig	J. Scott & Sons.	Greenock	United Kingdom	For McWhiter & Co.
27 March	Clydesdale	Steamship	M'Milland & Hunter	Greenock	United Kingdom	For private owner.
27 March	Alcibiade	Cygne-class brig		Toulon	France	For French Navy.
7 April	Jane	Merchantman	James Bayley	Woodbridge	United Kingdom	For private owner.
8 April	Faxfleet Hall	Brig	Samuel S. Walton	Hull	United Kingdom	For F. Cattley.
8 April	Coriolanus	Brig	Bolton and Humphrey	Hull	United Kingdom	For William Hopwood.
8 April	Rimswell	Full-rigged ship	Bolton and Humphrey	Hull	United Kingdom	For C. Thompson.
10 April	The Magnet	Cutter	George Bayley & Co	Ipswich	United Kingdom	For private owner.
12 April	St. George	Steamboat	John Wood & Co	Port Glasgow	United Kingdom	For Lochgoil and Lochlong Steam Boat Company.
15 April	Comète	Gazelle-class schooner		Toulon	France	For French Navy.
25 April	Fairy	Cherokee-class brig-sloop		Chatham Dockyard	United Kingdom	For Royal Navy.
25 April	United Kingdom	Steam yacht	R. Steele & Son	Greenock	United Kingdom	For private owner.
26 April	Manlius	Merchantman		Quebec	(United Kingdom of Great Britain and Ireland) Upper Canada	For private owner.
27 April	Vincennes	Boston-class sloop-of-war		Brooklyn Navy Yard	United States	For United States Navy.
29 April	Belfast	Steamship	William Denny	Dumbarton	United Kingdom	For private owner.
29 April	Dunoon Castle	Steamship	William Denny	Dumbarton	United Kingdom	For private owner.
April	Friedrich Wilhelm	Paddle steamer	Smit	Alblasserdam	Netherlands	For Dampschiffarts-Gesellschaft von Rhein und Main.
6 May	Englishman	Brig	William Mellanby	Stockton-on-Tees	United Kingdom	For J. Bockerby and others.
6 May	Skylark	Cherokee-class brig-sloop		Pembroke Dockyard	United Kingdom	For Royal Navy.
9 May	Espoir	Cherokee-class brig-sloop		Chatham Dockyard	United Kingdom	For Royal Navy.
9 May	Phœnix	Merchantman	Buckle & Davies	Chepstow	United Kingdom	For private owner.
9 May	Watersprite	Steamship	Graham	Harwich	United Kingdom	For private owner.
22 May	Daedalus	Modified Leda-class frigate		Sheerness Dockyard	United Kingdom	For Royal Navy.
22 May	George IV	Steamship	Haselden	Liverpool	United Kingdom	For Liverpool and Newry Steam Navigation Company.
22 May	Volcan	Vésuve-class bomb vessel		Bayonne	France	For French Navy.
22 May	Hecla	Vésuve-class bomb vessel		Bayonne	France	For French Navy.
24 May	Foster	Full-rigged ship	Thomas Brodrick	Whitby	United Kingdom	For executors of Joel Foster.
May	Hymen	Barque	E. & R. Lumsden	Sunderland	United Kingdom	For E. & R. Lumsden.
May	Salus	Brig			(United Kingdom of Great Britain and Ireland) Colony of Prince Edward Island	For private owner.
1 June	Eagle	Schooner		Aberdeen	United Kingdom	For private owner.
1 June	Sprightly	Brig	Adamson	Aberdeen	United Kingdom	For private owner.
2 June	Gipsy	Sloop	Laurie & Co.	Aberdeen	United Kingdom	For private owner.
6 June	Lion	Snow	Nicol, Reid & Co.	Aberdeen	United Kingdom	For private owner.
7 June	Albion	Merchantman	Alexander Gray	Kincardine	United Kingdom	For private owner.
7 June	Azov	Ship of the line	A. M. Kurochkin and V. A. Yershov	Arkhangelsk	Russia	For Imperial Russian Navy.
7 June	Erebus	Hecla-class bomb vessel		Pembroke Dockyard	United Kingdom	For Royal Navy.
7 June	Rose	Merchantman	Alexander Gray	Kincardine	United Kingdom	For private owner.
12 June	Lord Yarborough	Steamship	Daniel List	Fishbourne	United Kingdom	For private owner.
20 June	Jean Hastie	Merchantman		Great Yarmouth	United Kingdom	For private owner.
20 June	Woodbine	Brig	William Newham	Scarborough	United Kingdom	For Messrs. Fullerine, Owston and Fowler.
21 June	Captain Cook	Merchantman	R. Campion	Whitby	United Kingdom	For R. Campion.
26 June	Fifeshire	Smack	Sime & Rankin	Leith	United Kingdom	For Kirkcaldy and London Shipping Company.
June	Anne Comer	Brig			(United Kingdom of Great Britain and Ireland) Colony of Prince Edward Island	For private owner.
June	Magpie	Magpie-class schooner	Maclean	Jamaica	(United Kingdom of Great Britain and Ireland) Jamaica	For Royal Navy.
June	Phœnix	Brig		Miramichi	(United Kingdom of Great Britain and Ireland) Colony of New Brunswick	For private owner.
June	Thames	Merchantman	Bawden	Topsham	United Kingdom	For private owner.
4 July	Escape	Steamship		Harwich Dockyard	United Kingdom	For private owner.
5 July	Nisus	Cygne-class brig		Lorient	France	For French Navy.
7 July	Arcturus	Brig	Sime & Rankin	Leith	United Kingdom	For private owner.
8 July	Gipsy	Steamship	Mottershead & Heyes	Liverpool	United Kingdom	For Sir J. Tobin.
11 July	Anthony	Merchantman	G. W. Forritt	Scarborough	United Kingdom	For Messrs. Beswicks & Hesp.
14 July	Findhorn	Brig	Alexander Wright	Findhorn	United Kingdom	For private owner.
20 July	Fortitude	Schooner	Jabez Bayley	Ipswich	United Kingdom	For private owner.
20 July	Cigogne	Gazelle-class schooner		Bayonne	France	For French Navy.
20 July	Eclipse	Gazelle-class schooner		Bayonne	France	For French Navy.
22 July	Nora Cruna	Steamship	William Seddon & Co.	North Birkenhead	United Kingdom	For Waterford and Bristol Steam Packet Company.
July	Concordia	Paddle steamer	Nederlandsche Stoomboot Maatschappij	Rotterdam	Netherlands	For Dampschiffarts-Gesellschaft von Rhein und Main.
July	Nelson Village	Brig		Miramichi	(United Kingdom of Great Britain and Ireland) Colony of New Brunswick	For private owner.
2 August	Coquette	Brig	Daniel List	Fishbourne	United Kingdom	For Mr. Thorold.
5 August	Dart	Steamship	Henry Smith	Gainsborough	United Kingdom	For private owner.
7 August	Marchioness Wellesley	Paddle steamer	Morton	Dublin	United Kingdom	For Dublin and Wexford Steam Co.
18 August	The Lord Abercromby	Brig	McNelland & Mustard	Alloa	United Kingdom	For Messrs. MacNellan, Beattie and Black.
19 August	Calypso	Cherokee-class brig-sloop		Chatham Dockyard	United Kingdom	For Royal Navy.
19 August	Nemesis	Seringapatam-class frigate		Pembroke Dockyard	United Kingdom	For Royal Navy.
August	Cepheus	Snow			United Kingdom	For private owner.
August	Elizabeth Gillespie	Brigantine		Dumfries	United Kingdom	For private owner.
4 September	Royal Sovereign	Smack	Menzies & Sons	Leith	United Kingdom	For London and Edinburgh Shipping Company.
5 September	Earl of Roden	Steamship	Caleb & James Smith	Liverpool	United Kingdom	For St George Steam Packet Company.
5 September	John Renwick	West Indiaman	Smith	Newcastle upon Tyne	United Kingdom	For John Renwick.
16 September	Gale	Schooner	C. Gale	Whitby	United Kingdom	For private owner.
16 September	Tyrian	Cherokee-class brig-sloop		Woolwich Dockyard	United Kingdom	For Royal Navy.
23 September	Derbent	First rate	I. S. Razumov	Nicholaieff	Russia	For Imperial Russian Navy.
September	Spray	Brig			(United Kingdom of Great Britain and Ireland) Colony of New Brunswick	For private owner.
3 October	Murshid al-Jihad	Fourth rate	Louis-Charles Léfebure de Censy	Marseille	France	For Egyptian Navy.
3 October	Satellite	Satellite-class sloop	Robert Seppings	Pembroke Dockyard	United Kingdom	For Royal Navy.
October	Currency Lass	Schooner		Paterson Plains	(United Kingdom of Great Britain and Ireland) New South Wales	For Thomas Winder & others.
October	Indian Chief	Full-rigged ship		Liverpool	United Kingdom	For private owner.
1 November	Avon	Full-rigged ship	Thomas Brodrick	Whitby	United Kingdom	For R. W. Haden.
7 November	Mountstewart Elphinstone	Full-rigged ship	Steele	Greenock	United Kingdom	For John Fleming.
10 November	Liverpool	Third rate		Bombay	India	For Imaum of Muscat.
14 November	Challenger	Sixth rate		Portsmouth Dockyard	United Kingdom	For Royal Navy.
16 November	Acorn	Satellite-class sloop		Chatham Dockyard	United Kingdom	For Royal Navy.
29 November	Warren	Lexington-class sloop		Charlestown Navy Yard	United States	For Royal Navy.
30 November	The St. George	Merchantman	Wilson	Chester	United Kingdom	For private owner.
30 November	Tyne	Sixth rate		Woolwich Dockyard	United Kingdom	For Royal Navy.
November	Ant	Merchantman			United Kingdom	For private owner.
November	Paul Pry	Schooner		Shoreham-by-Sea	United Kingdom	For private owner.
1 December	Columbine	Columbine-class ship-sloop		Portsmouth Dockyard	United Kingdom	For Royal Navy.
1 December	Wolf	Wolf-class ship-sloop		Portsmouth Dockyard	United Kingdom	For Royal Navy.
5 December	Sincapore	Merchantman		St. Martins	(United Kingdom of Great Britain and Ireland) Colony of New Brunswick	For private owner.
14 December	Duke of Sussex	East Indiaman			United Kingdom	For British East India Company.
14 December	Hebe	Leda-class frigate	Henry Canham	Woolwich Dockyard	United Kingdom	For Royal Navy.
21 December	The Sussex	East Indiaman	Gordon	Deptford	United Kingdom	For British East India Company.
27 December	Alban	Alban-class paddle steamer		Deptford Dockyard	United Kingdom	For Royal Navy.
Summer	Foveran	Barque			Unknown	For private owner.
Autumn	Earl Dalhousie	Brig		Pictou	(United Kingdom of Great Britain and Ireland) Upper Canada	For private owner.
Unknown date	Abeona	Barque		Sunderland	United Kingdom	For Thomas Watson and James Watt.
Unknown date	Alexander Nevskii	Third rate		Saint Petersburg	Russia	For Imperial Russian Navy.
Unknown date	Amazonas	Fifth rate		New York	United States	For Imperial Brazilian Navy.
Unknown date	Anns	Schooner	John M. & William Gales	Sunderland	United Kingdom	For J. Cook.
Unknown date	Argus	Brig		Sunderland	United Kingdom	For private owner.
Unknown date	Autumn	Merchantman	Rowntree	Sunderland	United Kingdom	For private owner.
Unknown date	Bell	Merchantman	John M. & William Gales	Sunderland	United Kingdom	For Turner Thompson.
Unknown date	Benjamin Morgan	Schooner		Philadelphia, Pennsylvania	United States	For private owner.
Unknown date	Briton	Barque	John M. & William Gales	Sunderland	United Kingdom	For John M. & William Gales.
Unknown date	Captain Cook	Snow	J. Storey	Sunderland	United Kingdom	For Fleck & Co.
Unknown date	Ceres	Snow		Sunderland	United Kingdom	For W. Bagge & Co.
Unknown date	Charles Kerr	Merchantman	Philip Laing	Sunderland	United Kingdom	For Pirie & Co.
Unknown date	Clive	Sloop		Bombay	India	For British East India Company.
Unknown date	Comet	Merchantman		Portland	(United Kingdom of Great Britain and Ireland) Upper Canada	For Muir & Co.
Unknown date	Constitutionen	Paddle steamer			United Kingdom	For private owner.
Unknown date	Cumberland	Steamship		Holyhead	United Kingdom	For Liverpool Steam Company.
Unknown date	Dragon	Tug	R. Watson & Waters	Sunderland	United Kingdom	For private owner.
Unknown date	Dristigheten	Man of war			Sweden	For Royal Swedish Navy.
Unknown date	Duchess of Portland	West Indiaman	Robert Thomson	Troon	United Kingdom	For J. Hill.
Unknown date	Eden	Merchantman	Fletcher, Son & Fearnall	River Thames	United Kingdom	For Colvile Wedderburn & Co.
Unknown date	Egyptian	Merchantman		Quebec	(United Kingdom of Great Britain and Ireland) Upper Canada	For private owner.
Unknown date	Elbe	Merchantman		Sunderland	United Kingdom	For Mr. Maughan.
Unknown date	Eliza Dick	Merchantman	Philip Laing	Sunderland	United Kingdom	For Philip Laing.
Unknown date	George IV	Snow			United Kingdom	For private owner.
Unknown date	Georgiana	Barque	William Newton	Quebec	(United Kingdom of Great Britain and Ireland) Upper Canada	For private owner.
Unknown date	Hannah	Brig		Norton	(United Kingdom of Great Britain and Ireland) Colony of New Brunswick	For private owner.
Unknown date	Hope	Frigate		New York	United States	For Hellenic Navy.
Unknown date	Henry	Barque	Edward Adams	Bucklers Hard	United Kingdom	For Mr. Row.
Unknown date	Jessie	Full-rigged ship		Letang	(United Kingdom of Great Britain and Ireland) Colony of New Brunswick	For private owner.
Unknown date	Kite	Full-rigged ship	Frederick Baddeley	Brixham	United Kingdom	For Frederick Baddeley.
Unknown date	Lagoda	Whaler	Seth and Samuel Foster	Norwell, Massachusetts	United States	For Ezra Weston II.
Unknown date	Liberator	Frigate	Smith & Dimon	New York	United States	For Hellenic Navy, who were unable to pay for her. To United States Navy.
Unknown date	Lotus	Merchantman	T. Barrick	Whitby	United Kingdom	For private owner.
Unknown date	Luna	Yorkshire Billyboy	George Burton	Knottingley	United Kingdom	For private owner.
Unknown date	Manchester	Snow		Monkwearmouth	United Kingdom	For Mr. McCulloch.
Unknown date	Mary	Schooner	Richard Bussell	Lyme Regis	United Kingdom	For private owner.
Unknown date	Monkey	Magpie-class schooner	McLean	Jamaica	(United Kingdom of Great Britain and Ireland) Jamaica	For Royal Navy.
Unknown date	Mount Stewart Elphinstone	Full-rigged ship	Steel & Son	Bombay	India	For private owner.
Unknown date	Paley	Snow	J. Hall	Sunderland	United Kingdom	For Hall & Co.
Unknown date	Perseverance	Paddle steamer	D. Brent	Rotherhithe	United Kingdom	For F. A. Hastings.
Unknown date	Pleiades	Brig	Rowntree	Sunderland	United Kingdom	For Hogg & Co.
Unknown date	Priscilla	Merchantman	John M. & William Gales	Sunderland	United Kingdom	For John Craig.
Unknown date	Rachel	Brig		Monkwearmouth	United Kingdom	For Withel & Co.
Unknown date	Rapid	Brig		Great Yarmouth	United Kingdom	For Priest & Co.
Unknown date	Renown	Snow	John M. & William Gales	Sunderland	United Kingdom	For Peter Jackson.
Unknown date	Restoracion	Frigate			Spain	For Spanish Navy.
Unknown date	Rotterdam	Fourth rate		Rotterdam	Netherlands	For Royal Netherlands Navy.
Unknown date	Sappho	Brig	Robert Steele & Co.	Greenock	United Kingdom	For Stewart & Co.
Unknown date	Sarah	Schooner	J. & R. Lightfoot	Sunderland	United Kingdom	For B. Dunnington.
Unknown date	Sophia	Merchantman		Quebec	(United Kingdom of Great Britain and Ireland) Upper Canada	For private owner.
Unknown date	The Skeen	Full-rigged ship		Perth	United Kingdom	For private owner.
Unknown date	Thetis	Brig	Tiffin	Sunderland	United Kingdom	For private owner.
Unknown date	Thomas Jackson	Full-rigged ship	Edward Gibson	Hull	United Kingdom	For private owner.
Unknown date	Wanstead	West Indiaman		Saint John	(United Kingdom of Great Britain and Ireland) Colony of New Brunswick	For Gale & Son.
