= List of ship launches in 1828 =

The list of ship launches in 1828 includes a chronological list of some ships launched in 1828.

Date	Ship	Class	Builder	Location	Country	Notes
3 January	Meg Merrilles	Brig	Robert Campion	Whitby	United Kingdom	For Messrs. Luffer & Co.
19 January	Cruizer	Snake-class ship-sloop		Chatham Dockyard	United Kingdom	For Royal Navy.
2 February	Agnes	East Indiaman	Menzies & Sons	Leith	United Kingdom	For private owner.
16 February	Warrior	Merchantman	Emmbert	Chepstow	United Kingdom	For private owner.
18 February	Pelham	Paddle Steamer	Smith	Gainsborough	United Kingdom	For Grimsby and Hull Steam Packet Company.
21 February	Edward Lombe	Full-rigged ship	Thomas Brodrick	Whitby	United Kingdom	For Robert Freeman.
22 February	Tullyallan Castle	Steamship	Gray	Kincardine	United Kingdom	For private owner.
23 February	Adeline	Steamship		North Shields	United Kingdom	For private owner.
28 February	Emma	Mersey flat	New Quay Company	Liverpool	United Kingdom	For Mersey and Irwell Navigation.
1 March	Capricieuse	Gazelle-class schooner		Bayonne	France	For French Navy.
5 March	William Fawcett	Steamship	Caleb & James Smith	Liverpool	United Kingdom	For Fawcett & Preston.
15 March	Robin Hood	Brig	R. and N. Campion	Whitby	United Kingdom	For private owner.
17 March	Bombay	Canopus-class ship of the line		Bombay Dockyard	India	For Royal Navy.
17 March	Pearl	Sloop	Philip Sainty	Wivenhoe	United Kingdom	For Royal Navy.
March	Partisan	Snow	L. Crown	Sunderland	United Kingdom	For J. Dale.
1 April	Hopewell	Full-rigged ship	John Longbourne & Co.	Whitby	United Kingdom	For George White.
2 April	Duke of Roxburgh	Barque	T. & W. Smith	Newcastle upon Tyne	United Kingdom	For Pirie & Co.
4 April	Boyne	Brig	Ritchie & McLaine	Belfast	United Kingdom	For Messrs. Hardy & Clark and Messrs. George & Richard Haloran.
5 April	Lord William Bentinck	Merchantman	F. Preston	Great Yarmouth	United Kingdom	For F. Preston.
15 April	Leda	Seringapatam-class frigate		Pembroke Dockyard	United Kingdom	For Royal Navy.
15 April	Dore	Vésuve-class bomb vessel		Bayonne	France	For French Navy.
15 April	Finistère	Vésuve-class bomb vessel		Bayonne	France	For French Navy.
16 April	Thames	Schooner	William Bayley	Ipswich	United Kingdom	For John Roberts & Jeffry Smith.
19 April	Cyclope	Vésuve-class bomb vessel		Toulon	France	For French Navy.
25 April	Glenalvon	Barque	J. Burdon	Sunderland	United Kingdom	For Home & Co.
26 April	Lord William Bentinck	Merchantman	Hillhouse & Sons	Bristol	United Kingdom	For George Hillhouse.
27 April	Ardebil	Brig	S. O. Burachek	Astrakhan	Russia	For Imperial Russian Navy.
28 April	James Pattison	Merchantman	Adam Gordon	Deptford	United Kingdom	For private owner.
30 April	Miranda	Schooner		Port Glasgow	United Kingdom	For private owner.
April	Earl Bathurst	Merchantman	John M. Gales	Sunderland	United Kingdom	For John M. Gales.
April	Pearl	Cutter		Warsash	United Kingdom	For Marquess of Anglesey.
April	Zebra	Yacht	Blaker	Southampton	United Kingdom	For A. Richardson.
1 May	Andromache	East Indiaman	G. H. Porrett	Scarborough	United Kingdom	For Mr. Jacobs.
1 May	Halkia	Schooner	Mulvey	Chester	United Kingdom	For private owner.
1 May	Harlequin	Yacht	Daniel List	Fishbourne	United Kingdom	For George Vernon.
1 May	Medora	Yacht	Blaker	Southampton	United Kingdom	For J. Greathead.
8 May	Caledonia	Full-rigged ship		New York	United States	For private owner.
10 May	Vulcain	Vésuve-class bomb vessel		Toulon	France	For French Navy.
12 May	Ondine	Cutter	Ruble	Southampton	United Kingdom	For G. W. Heneage.
15 May	German	Brig	Messrs. Pearson	Thorne Waterside	United Kingdom	For private owner.
15 May	Achéron	Vésuve-class bomb vessel		Toulon	France	For French Navy.
15 May	Peri	Cutter	Ruble	Southampton	United Kingdom	For Mr. Murray.
20 May	Ann	Brigantine	Charles Connell & Sons	Belfast	United Kingdom	For Thomas Williamson.
26 May	Royal Admiral	Barque	William Bottomly	King's Lynn	United Kingdom	For William Bottomly.
27 May	Prince George	Barque	William Wright	North Shields	United Kingdom	For Henry Wright.
29 May	Lord Goderich	East Indiaman	Dikes and Gibson	Hull	United Kingdom	For John Featherstone.
May	Benton	Merchantman	R. Dixon	Sunderland	United Kingdom	For Mr. McCree.
May	Traveller	Schooner		Grimsby	United Kingdom	For private owner.
13 June	Dzhevan Bulak	Brig	S. O. Burachek	Astrakhan	Russia	For Imperial Russian Navy.
13 June	Turkmenchai	Brig	S. O. Burachek	Astrakhan	Russia	For Imperial Russian Navy.
25 June	Miranda	Yacht		Southampton	United Kingdom	For J. Maxse.
28 June	Fairfield	Boston-class sloop		New York Navy Yard	United States	For United States Navy.
28 June	Snipe	Nightingale-class cutter		Pembroke Dockyard	United Kingdom	For Royal Navy.
28 June	Sparrow	Bramble-class cutter		Pembroke Dockyard	United Kingdom	For Royal Navy.
28 June	Speedy	Nightingale-class cutter		Pembroke Dockyard	United Kingdom	For Royal Navy.
30 June	Amelia	Yacht		Milford Haven	United Kingdom	For B. R. Robertson.
30 June	Industrious	Smack	Roberts	Milford Haven	United Kingdom	For private owner.
30 June	Pansylipo	Cutter	John Jones	Hirael	United Kingdom	For Walter Davies Griffith.
June	Ann	Schooner		Belfast	United Kingdom	For private owner.
June	Mary Macdonald	Brig		Three Rivers	(United Kingdom of Great Britain and Ireland) Colony of Prince Edward Island	For private owner.
June	Penrith	Merchantman		Cocagne	(United Kingdom of Great Britain and Ireland) Colony of New Brunswick	For private owner.
June	William Francis	Sloop		Morton	United Kingdom	For private owner.
15 July	Didon	Dryade-class frigate		Toulon	France	For French Navy.
28 July	Melpomène	Surveillante-class frigate		Cherbourg	France	For French Navy.
28 July	Royal Adelaide	Princess Charlotte-class ship of the line	Edward Churchill	Plymouth Dockyard	United Kingdom	For Royal Navy.
July	Æolus	Schooner		Cornwallis	(United Kingdom of Great Britain and Ireland) Colony of Nova Scotia	For private owner.
July	Leman	Man-of-war		Nicholaieff	Russia	For Imperial Russian Navy.
July	Mary Clarke	Brig		Hopewell	(United Kingdom of Great Britain and Ireland) Colony of New Brunswick	For private owner.
July	Mingrelia	Brig		Nicholaieff	Russia	For Imperial Russian Navy.
July	Sarah	Brig		Amherst	(United Kingdom of Great Britain and Ireland) Colony of Nova Scotia	For private owner.
July	The Pride of the Ocean	Pleasure boat			United Kingdom	For A. Corbet.
July	Tschesme	Ship of the line		Nicholaieff	Russia	For Imperial Russian Navy.
1 August	Belle Gabrielle	Surveillante-class frigate		Cherbourg	France	For French Navy.
11 August	Comus	Comet-class sloop		Pembroke Dockyard	United Kingdom	For Royal Navy.
12 August	Mabon	Schooner	L. Rose & Son	Leith	United Kingdom	For Leith and Hull Shipping Company.
14 August	Comet	Comet-class sloop	James Taylor	Pembroke Dockyard	United Kingdom	For Royal Navy.
14 August	Waldemar	Third Rate		Copenhagen	Denmark	For Royal Danish Navy.
16 August	Dryade	Didon-class frigate		Rochefort	France	For French Navy.
18 August	St. Louis	Sloop-of-war		Washington Navy Yard	United States	For United States Navy.
25 August	Herminie	Frigate		Lorient	France	For French Navy.
26 August	Nimrod	Atholl-class corvette		Deptford Dockyard	United Kingdom	For Royal Navy.
26 August	Sandbach	West Indiaman	Mottershead & Heyes	Liverpool	United Kingdom	For Sandbach, Tinne & Co.
28 August	Osbert	Collier	James Laing	South Shields	United Kingdom	For private owner.
30 August	Elizabeth	Frigate		Odesa	Russia	For Imperial Russian Navy.
August	Edward Charleton	Merchantman	Wilkinson	Sunderland	United Kingdom	For Charelton & Co.
18 September	Enchantress	West Indiaman	Joseph Tipitt	Bristol	United Kingdom	For private owner.
20 September	Monongahela	Packet ship		Philadelphia, Pennsylvania	United States	For W. and J. Brown & Co.
23 September	Clara	Barque	T. Brodrick	Whitby	United Kingdom	For W. Fraser & Co.
24 September	Concord	Boston-class sloop		Portsmouth Naval Shipyard	United States	For United States Navy.
24 September	Miana	Brig	S. O. Burachek	Astrakhan	Russia	For Imperial Russian Navy.
September	Thomas and Mary	Snow	T. Tiffing	Sunderland	United Kingdom	For private owner.
2 October	Zoe	Miniature frigate		Cowes	United Kingdom	For Earl of Belfast.
9 October	Clyde	Modified Leda-class frigate		Woolwich Dockyard	United Kingdom	For Royal Navy.
9 October	Hotspur	Seringapatam-class frigate		Pembroke Dockyard	United Kingdom	For Royal Navy.
24 October	Duke of Buccleuch	Smack	Menzies & Son	Leith	United Kingdom	For London and Leith Old Shipping Company.
29 October	Duke of Buccleuch	Smack	Menzies & Sons	Leith	United Kingdom	For London and Leith Old Shipping Company.
October	Atlas	Steamship		Rotterdam	Netherlands	For private owner.
October	Chance-It	Merchantman			United Kingdom	For private owner.
October	George IV	Full-rigged ship	James Johnson	River Wear	United Kingdom	For private owner.
October	Minerva	Frigate			Russia	For Imperial Russian Navy.
October	Renard	Schooner	Wilkinson	Sunderland	United Kingdom	For M. Plummer & Co.
October	Vadeja l'Esperance	Frigate			Russia	For Imperial Russian Navy.
1 November	Arcis	Ship of the line		Okta	Russia	For Imperial Russian Navy.
1 November	Nadeshda	Frigate		Okta	Russia	For Imperial Russian Navy.
10 November	Atlas	Steamship	Furley	Gainsborough, Lincolnshire	United Kingdom	For private owner.
11 November	Omheten	Ship of the line		Saint Petersburg	Russia	For Imperial Russian Navy.
22 November	Artémise	Frigate		Lorient	France	For French Navy.
30 November	Mahmudiye	First rate	Antuvan Kaifa	Constantinople	Ottoman Empire	For Ottoman Navy.
Unknown date	Anacreon	Brig		Sunderland	United Kingdom	For private owner.
Unknown date	Benjamin Rush	Cutter		Erie, Pennsylvania	United States	For United States Revenue Cutter Service.
Unknown date	Bheema	Pattamer		Bombay	India	For British East India Company.
Unknown date	Boreas	Merchantman	T. Rowntree	Sunderland	United Kingdom	For Mr. Ness.
Unknown date	Brilliant Star	Merchantman	William Gales	Sunderland	United Kingdom	For George Thompson.
Unknown date	Caspian	Merchantman		Sunderland	United Kingdom	For private owner.
Unknown date	Clorinda	Barque	W. Adamson & Sons	Sunderland	United Kingdom	For Mr. McGeary.
Unknown date	Commerce	Steamship	Jabez Bayley	Ipswich	United Kingdom	For private owner.
Unknown date	Diamond	Merchantman	T. Reed	Sunderland	United Kingdom	For private owner.
Unknown date	Dordrecht	Transport ship		Dordrecht	Netherlands	For Royal Netherlands Navy.
Unknown date	Duke of Clarence	Snow	William Gales	Sunderland	United Kingdom	For Mr. Fenwick.
Unknown date	Euprhates	Brig		Bombay	India	For British East India Company.
Unknown date	Fanny	Barque		Sunderland	United Kingdom	For Mr. Donaldson.
Unknown date	Freya	Frigate			Norway	For Royal Norwegian Navy.
Unknown date	Gem	Schooner	Allison	Sunderland	United Kingdom	For T. Guy.
Unknown date	Hibernia	Passenger ship		Murray Harbour	(United Kingdom of Great Britain and Ireland) Colony of Prince Edward Island	For private owner.
Unknown date	Hilton	Merchantman	William Gales	Sunderland	United Kingdom	For William Gales.
Unknown date	Hormanjee Bomanjee	Full-rigged ship		Bombay	India	For private owner.
Unknown date	Jane	Brigantine		Sunderland	United Kingdom	For private owner.
Unknown date	Jane Lockhart	Barque		Sunderland	United Kingdom	For Mr. Dalrymple.
Unknown date	Jean Young	Merchantman	Philip Laing	Sunderland	United Kingdom	For private owner.
Unknown date	John Pirie	Merchantman	Philip Laing	Sunderland	United Kingdom	For Pirie & Co.
Unknown date	Lord Durham	Merchantman	William Gales	Sunderland	United Kingdom	For William Gales.
Unknown date	Lucretia	Merchantman	Philip Laing	Sunderland	United Kingdom	For Hall & Co.
Unknown date	Marys	Merchantman	Philip Laing	Sunderland	United Kingdom	For Philip Laing.
Unknown date	Miranda	Merchantman		Bristol	United Kingdom	For Drew & Co.
Unknown date	Panna or Pownah	Pattamer		Bombay	India	For British East India Company.
Unknown date	Plawsworth	Brig	Robert Reay	Sunderland	United Kingdom	For private owner.
Unknown date	Regalia	Merchantman		Monkwearmouth	United Kingdom	For private owner.
Unknown date	Rhoda	Brig		Sunderland	United Kingdom	For private owner.
Unknown date	Robert	Snow	T. Reed, or Reed & Young	Sunderland	United Kingdom	For private owner.
Unknown date	Royal Oak	Sloop			United Kingdom	For private owner.
Unknown date	Ryhope	Snow	William Gales	Sunderland	United Kingdom	For William Gales-.
Unknown date	Sir Charles Malcolm	East Indiaman		Bombay	India	For Bombay Marine.
Unknown date	Sophia Jane	Paddle steamer	Barnes & Miller	Ratcliffe	United Kingdom	For Barnes & Miller.
Unknown date	Strath Ban	Merchantman		Londonderry	United Kingdom	For unknown owner.
Unknown date	Suriname	Fifth rate steamship			Netherlands	For Royal Netherlands Navy.
Unknown date	Three sisters	Sloop	John Ball Jr.	Salcombe	United Kingdom	For John Pillar.
Unknown date	Vandalia	Boston-class sloop		Philadelphia Navy Yard	United Kingdom	For United States Navy.
Unknown date	Windhond	Full-rigged ship		Vlissingen	Netherlands	For Royal Netherlands Navy.
Unknown date	Zelina	Schooner	W. Adamson & Sons	Sunderland	United Kingdom	For Mr. Alexander.
