= Gunjava (ship) =

Several vessels have been named Gunjava:

- Gunjava (1786 ship), of 680 tons (bm), was launched at Rangoon in 1786 and broken up at Calcutta.
- Gunjava (1826 ship) was launched at Sulkea in 1826. She was wrecked in December 1827 at Madras.
