= List of shipwrecks in September 1830 =

The list of shipwrecks in September 1830 includes ships sunk, foundered, grounded, or otherwise lost during September 1830.

== 1 September ==
List of shipwrecks: 1 September 1830
Ship	State	Description
Sincapore	United Kingdom	The ship was driven ashore in Table Bay and was wrecked. She was on a voyage from Mauritius to Glasgow, Renfrewshire.

== 2 September ==
List of shipwrecks: 2 September 1830
Ship	State	Description
HNLMS Sumatra	Netherlands Navy	Belgian Revolution: The Java-class frigate ran aground at Antwerp and was wrecked.

== 5 September ==
List of shipwrecks: 5 September 1830
Ship	State	Description
Jane	United Kingdom	The sloop was driven ashore and wrecked in Macrihanish Bay.

== 8 September ==
List of shipwrecks: 8 September 1830
Ship	State	Description
Betty	United Kingdom	The ship ran aground on the North Bank, in Liverpool Bay. She was on a voyage from Liverpool, Lancashire to Helsingør, Denmark.

== 11 September ==
List of shipwrecks: 11 September 1830
Ship	State	Description
William	United Kingdom	The ship capsized and sank in the Bristol Channel off The Mumbles, Glamorgan. Her crew were rescued.

== 12 September ==
List of shipwrecks: 12 September 1830
Ship	State	Description
Ann	United Kingdom	The ship was driven ashore and wrecked at Spurn Point, Yorkshire.

== 13 September ==
List of shipwrecks: 13 September 1830
Ship	State	Description
No. 6	Imperial Russian Navy	The transport ship was driven ashore at Odesa. Her crew were rescued. She broke up on 14 September.

== 14 September ==
List of shipwrecks: 14 September 1830
Ship	State	Description
Agenoria	United Kingdom	The brig was driven ashore at Sydney, Nova Scotia, British North America.

== 16 September ==
List of shipwrecks: 16 September 1830
Ship	State	Description
Friendship	United Kingdom	The ship was wrecked on the Black Middens, in the North Sea off South Shields, County Durham. Her crew were rescued.
Wellington	United Kingdom	The schooner was wrecked at Wick, Caithness. Her crew were rescued.

== 17 September ==
List of shipwrecks: 17 September 1830
Ship	State	Description
Kinnersley Castle	United Kingdom	The ship ran aground on a reef near Pictou, Nova Scotia, British North America and was abandoned by her crew. She was later refloated and taken in to Pictou. Kinnersley Castle was on a voyage from Pugwash, Nova Scotia to Newcastle upon Tyne, Northumberland.

== 18 September ==
List of shipwrecks: 18 September 1830
Ship	State	Description
Alert	United Kingdom	The ship was in collision with Liverpool (United Kingdom) off Ramsey, Isle of Man and sank. She was on a voyage from Liverpool, Lancashire to Larne, County Antrim.

== 19 September ==
List of shipwrecks: 19 September 1830
Ship	State	Description
Dove	United Kingdom	The ship ran aground on the Lynn Long Sands, in The Wash and sank. Her crew were rescued.
Eden	United Kingdom	The ship was driven ashore at Saundersfoot, Pembrokeshire.
Lord Cochrane	United Kingdom	The ship was wrecked on the Newcombe Sand, in the North Sea off Great Yarmouth, Norfolk. Her crew survived. She was on a voyage from Newcastle upon Tyne, Northumberland to London.
Mary	United Kingdom	The ship was driven ashore at Saundersfoot.
Palm	United Kingdom	The ship departed from Matanzas, Cuba for Trieste. No further trace, presumed foundered with the loss of all hands

== 20 September ==
List of shipwrecks: 20 September 1830
Ship	State	Description
Bideford	United Kingdom	The ship foundered in the English Channel off The Lizard, Cornwall. Her crew survived. She was on a voyage from Falmouth, Cornwall to Newport, Monmouthshire.
Cheviot	United Kingdom	The ship was wrecked near Marstrand, Sweden. Her crew were rescued. She was on a voyage from Dundee, Forfarshire to Saint Petersburg, Russia.
Earl Dalhousie	United Kingdom	The ship was wrecked on Skagen, Denmark. Her crew were rescued. She was on a voyage from Hull, Yorkshire to Saint Petersburg, Russia.
Parker	United Kingdom	The ship sank in The Wash off Boston, Lincolnshire. Her crew survived.
Suffolk	United Kingdom	The steamship was wrecked at South Shields, County Durham. Her crew were rescued. She was on a voyage from Hull to South Shields.
Watson	United Kingdom	The ship foundered in the Irish Sea off Douglas, Isle of Man. Her crew were rescued. She was on a voyage from Whitehaven, Cumberland to Douglas.

== 21 September ==
List of shipwrecks: 21 September 1830
Ship	State	Description
Earl Dalhousie	United Kingdom	The ship was wrecked on Skagen, Denmark. She was on a voyage from Hull to Saint Petersburg, Russia.
Leslie	United Kingdom	The ship was wrecked near Dundee, Forfarshire She was on a voyage from Danzig, Prussia to London.
Scotia	United Kingdom	The brig was wrecked on the Elbow End Sand, in the Firth of Tay with the loss of four of her crew. She was on a voyage from Danzig to London.

== 22 September ==
List of shipwrecks: 22 September 1830
Ship	State	Description
Lord Castlereagh	United Kingdom	The ship was wrecked on a reef off Domesnes, Norway. Her crew were rescued. She was on a voyage from Riga, Russia to Leith, Lothian.
Swift	United Kingdom	The sloop was wrecked at "Cova Green", Ayrshire.

== 23 September ==
List of shipwrecks: 23 September 1830
Ship	State	Description
Elizabeth and James	United Kingdom	The ship sank at Bridlington, Yorkshire.
Idvies	United Kingdom	The ship was wrecked on the Gunfleet Sand, in the North Sea off the coast of Essex. She was on a voyage from Saint Petersburg, Russia to London.
Moore	United Kingdom	The ship was wrecked in Caernarvon Bay. She was on a voyage from Waterford to Liverpool, Lancashire.
Nymph	United Kingdom	The ship was driven ashore and wrecked at Deal, Kent.
Surprise	United Kingdom	The ship was driven ashore and wrecked in West Bay, Dover, Kent. All on board were rescued. She was on a voyage from Cephalonia, Greece to London.

== 24 September ==
List of shipwrecks: 24 September 1830
Ship	State	Description
County of Cork	United Kingdom	The ship was driven ashore in Cardigan Bay. She was on a voyage from New Ross, County Wexford to New York, United States.
La Henrietta	France	The brig was run down and sunk off the coast of Chile by Mary Ann (United Kingdom). Her crew were rescued by Mary Ann.
John	United Kingdom	The whaler was lost in the Davis Straits. Her crew were rescued by Swan (United Kingdom).
Maria	Austrian Empire	The brigantine was wrecked near Westport, County Mayo, United Kingdom. She was on a voyage from Bergen, Norway to Sicily and Venice.
Ossian	Russia	The ship was wrecked in Old Dorney Bay. She was on a voyage from Saint Petersburg to Liverpool, Lancashire, United Kingdom.

== 25 September ==
List of shipwrecks: 25 September 1830
Ship	State	Description
Elizabeth	United Kingdom	The ship sank at Hubberston, Pembrokeshire.
Jones	United Kingdom	The ship capsized in the Atlantic Ocean. Her crew were rescued. She was on a voyage from Quebec City, Lower Canada, British North America to Workington, Cumberland.

== 26 September ==
List of shipwrecks: 26 September 1830
Ship	State	Description
Anne	United Kingdom	The ship was wrecked on the Shipwash Sand, in the North Sea off the coast of Essex. Her crew survived. She was on a voyage from Sunderland, County Durham to London.

== 27 September ==
List of shipwrecks: 27 September 1830
Ship	State	Description
Mary Ann	United Kingdom	The ship sank at Caernarfon.

== 29 September ==
List of shipwrecks: 29 September 1830
Ship	State	Description
Ariadne	United Kingdom	The ship ran aground on the Cross Sand, in the North Sea off the coast of Suffolk and was severely damaged. She was consequently beached at Southwold, Suffolk.

== 30 September ==
List of shipwrecks: 30 September 1830
Ship	State	Description
Spanish Patriot	United Kingdom	The ship was wrecked on the Cockle Sand, in the North Sea of the coast of Norfolk. Her crew were rescued. She was on a voyage from Woolwich, Kent to Newcastle upon Tyne, Northumberland.

== Unknown date ==
List of shipwrecks: Unknown date 1830
Ship	State	Description
Alert	United Kingdom	The schooner foundered in the Irish Sea off Ramsey, Isle of Man in late September. She was on a voyage from Liverpool, Lancashire to Larne, County Antrim.
Jonge Clavis	Lübeck	The ship ran aground on the Sunk Sand, in the North Sea off the coast of Norfolk, United Kingdom and was abandoned by her crew. She was on a voyage from Lübeck to King's Lynn, Norfolk. Jonge Clavis was later taken in to Hunstanton, Norfolk.
Richard and Mary	United Kingdom	The ship was wrecked on Borkum, Kingdom of Hanover.
