= List of shipwrecks in March 1833 =

The list of shipwrecks in March 1833 includes ships sunk, foundered, grounded, or otherwise lost during March 1833.

== 1 March ==
List of shipwrecks: 1 March 1833
Ship	State	Description
Osprey	United Kingdom	The ship was wrecked on Tory Island, County Donegal with the loss of three of her crew. She was on a voyage from the Clyde to Westport, County Mayo.

== 2 March ==
List of shipwrecks: 2 March 1833
Ship	State	Description
Elizabeth	United Kingdom	The ship was wrecked on the North Bank, in Liverpool Bay.

== 4 March ==
List of shipwrecks: 4 March 1833
Ship	State	Description
Sagamore	United States	The ship was driven ashore and wrecked in Rhode Island. She was on a voyage from Saint Petersburg, Russia to New York.

== 6 March ==
List of shipwrecks: 6 March 1833
Ship	State	Description
Good Statesman	United Kingdom	The schooner struck a floating log and consequently foundered about 3 leagues (9 nautical miles (17 km) off St Ives Head, Cornwall. Her crew survived.
James Wilson	(United Kingdom of Great Britain and Ireland) Isle of Man	The ship was driven ashore at Laxey. She was on a voyage from Douglas to Laxey.

== 8 March ==
List of shipwrecks: 8 March 1833
Ship	State	Description
Minstrel Boy	United Kingdom	The ship was driven ashore and wrecked between Cape Split and Cape Blow-me-down, Nova Scotia, British North America. She was on a voyage from Demerara Saint John, New Brunswick, British North America.

== 9 March ==
List of shipwrecks: 9 March 1833
Ship	State	Description
Elizabeth	United Kingdom	The ship was abandoned. Her crew were rescued by Lady Vaughan (United Kingdom). Elizabeth was on a voyage from Waterford to Newhaven, Sussex.

== 10 March ==
List of shipwrecks: 10 March 1833
Ship	State	Description
Ann	United Kingdom	The ship was lost in the North Sea off the mouth of the River Colne. Her crew were rescued. She was on a voyage from Great Yarmouth, Norfolk to London.

== 11 March ==
List of shipwrecks: 11 March 1833
Ship	State	Description
Henry Ewbank	United States	The ship was abandoned in the Atlantic Ocean. She was on a voyage from Charleston, South Carolina to London, United Kingdom.

== 13 March ==
List of shipwrecks: 13 March 1833
Ship	State	Description
Sukhum-Kale (Сухум-Кале)	Imperial Russian Navy	The transport ship was driven ashore and wrecked at Pitsunda with the loss of one life. Her crew were rescued.

== 14 March ==
List of shipwrecks: 14 March 1833
Ship	State	Description
Enigheden	Norway	The ship was driven ashore and severely damaged at Sunderland, County Durham, United Kingdom. She was on a voyage from "Dram" to Sunderland.
Nelson	United Kingdom	The ship was driven ashore and wrecked at Youghal, County Cork.
Traveller	United Kingdom	The sloop foundered in the North Sea north of Whitby, Yorkshire. Her crew survived.

== 15 March ==
List of shipwrecks: 15 March 1833
Ship	State	Description
Industry	United Kingdom	The ship was lost near Nieuwpoort, West Flanders, Belgium. Her crew were rescued. She was on a voyage from Dover, Kent to Nieuwpoort.
Marion	United States	The ship was wrecked on the Goodwin Sands, Kent. Her crew were rescued. She was on a voyage from Antwerp, Belgium to Mobile, Alabama.
Teatshill	United Kingdom	The ship was driven ashore on Île Pelée, near Cherbourg, Seine-Inférieure, France. She was on a voyage from Newport, Monmouthshire to Havre de Grâce, Seine-Inférieure.

== 16 March ==
List of shipwrecks: 16 March 1833
Ship	State	Description
British Queen	United Kingdom	The ship was driven ashore and wrecked at Freshwater West, Pembrokeshire. She was on a voyage from Swansea, Glamorgan to Pwllheli, Caernarfonshire.
Enigheden	Norway	The ship was driven ashore and severely damaged at Sunderland, County Durham, United Kingdom.
Sophia	United Kingdom	The whaler was destroyed by fire off the Seychelles. Her crew were rescued.

== 17 March ==
List of shipwrecks: 17 March 1833
Ship	State	Description
Wellington	United Kingdom	The ship was driven ashore at Pennington.
Union	United Kingdom	Liberal Wars: The brig entered Porto, Portugal flying a distress flag. She was fired upon by shore based artillery and was abandoned by her crew. Union was subsequently looted and set afire by the Miguelites.

== 18 March ==
List of shipwrecks: 18 March 1833
Ship	State	Description
Arethusa	United Kingdom	The ship was wrecked off Aveiro, Portugal with the loss of three of her crew. She was on a voyage from Lisbon, Portugal to Gibraltar.

== 19 March ==
List of shipwrecks: 19 March 1833
Ship	State	Description
Crawford	United Kingdom	The ship was wrecked at Great Yarmouth, Norfolk. Her crew were rescued.
Helen	United Kingdom	The ship was wrecked on the Little Cork Reef. Her crew were rescued. She was on a voyage from Jamaica to London.
Henriette	Bremen	The ship was wrecked on Eierland, North Holland, Netherlands. Her crew were rescued. She was on a voyage from Bremen to Amsterdam, North Holland.

== 20 March ==
List of shipwrecks: 20 March 1833
Ship	State	Description
Joseph and John	United Kingdom	The Humber keel ran aground on the Haisborough Sands, in the North Sea off the coast of Norfolk. Her crew were rescued. She was on a voyage from Boston, Lincolnshire to London. Joseph and John was later taken in to Great Yarmouth, Norfolk.
Pizzaro	United Kingdom	The ship ran aground on the Fish Key. She was on a voyage from Kingston, Jamaica to London.

== 24 March ==
List of shipwrecks: 24 March 1833
Ship	State	Description
Bee	United Kingdom	The ship departed from Grenada for Bristol, Gloucestershire. No further trace, presumed foundered in the Atlantic Ocean with the loss of all hands.

== 25 March ==
List of shipwrecks: 25 March 1833
Ship	State	Description
Vigilant	UKGBI	The ship was wrecked at Maldonado, Uruguay. She was on a voyage from "St. Catalina" to Montevideo, Uruguay.

== 30 March ==
List of shipwrecks: 30 March 1833
Ship	State	Description
Duncan	(United Kingdom of Great Britain and Ireland) Saint Lucia	The drogher was wrecked off "Micond".
Elizabeth	United Kingdom	The ship was wrecked on Glover's Reef. She was on a voyage from British Honduras to Liverpool, Lancashire.

== 31 March ==
List of shipwrecks: 31 March 1833
Ship	State	Description
Aurora	Bremen	The ship was wrecked near Concepción. She was on a voyage from Sète, Hérault, France to Bremen.
Edward	United Kingdom	The ship was wrecked at Nykøbing, Denmark. Her crew were rescued. She was on a voyage from Memel, Prussia to Waterford.
Elizabeth Fredericke	Danzig	The ship was wrecked on Anholt, Denmark with the loss of her captain. She was on a voyage from Newcastle upon Tyne, Northumberland, United Kingdom to Danzig.

== Unknown date ==
List of shipwrecks: Unknown date in March 1833
Ship	State	Description
Active	United Kingdom	The ship was wrecked on the Whiteness Rock. She was on a voyage from Guernsey, Channel Islands to London.
Alexander	United Kingdom	The ship foundered before 13 March whilst on a voyage from Sierra Leone to a British port. Her crew were resched.
Barleycorn	United Kingdom	The ship foundered in the Irish Sea off St. Gowans Head, Pembrokeshire.
Brisbane	(United Kingdom of Great Britain and Ireland) New South Wales	The cutter was wrecked in Jervis Bay before 11 March.
Ellen	United Kingdom	The ship foundered in the English Channel off Littlehampton, Sussex before 11 March.
Fanny	United Kingdom	The ship was lost in the Cape Verde Islands, Portugal. She was on a voyage from Liverpool, Lancashire to Sierra Leone.
John	United Kingdom	The ship was wrecked near Bordeaux, Gironde, France on or before 8 March. Her crew were rescued. She was on a voyage from Newcastle upon Tyne, Northumberland to Bordeaux.
Olinda	United Kingdom	The ship was abandoned in the Atlantic Ocean. She was on a voyage from Liverpool to Saint John, New Brunswick, British North America.
Turners	United Kingdom	The ship was wrecked at Cape Henry, Virginia, United States.
