= Julian and Agnes =

1801 play

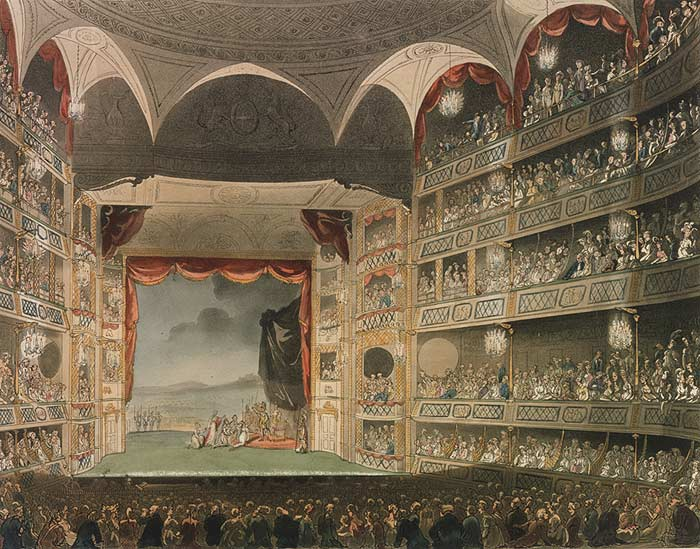
- Drury Lane
- Original language: English
- Written by: William Sotheby
- Genre: Tragedy
- Setting: Great St Bernard Pass, Switzerland

Premiere
- Date: 25 April 1801
- Place: Theatre Royal, Drury Lane, London

Julian and Agnes is an 1801 Gothic tragedy by the British writer William Sotheby. Best known as a poet, he wrote several tragedies but this was his only play to be performed in London's West End. It premiered at the Theatre Royal, Drury Lane on 25 April 1801.

The original cast included John Philip Kemble as Jullian, Sarah Siddons as Agnes, Richard Wroughton as Provost, John Hayman Packer as Prior, William Barrymore as Confesser, Charles Holland as Infirmier, Walter Maddocks as Steward, William Powell as Francis and Anne Biggs as Ellen.

== Bibliography ==
- Evans, Bertrand. Gothic Drama from Walpole to Shelley. Univ of California Press, 2023.
- Greene, John C. Theatre in Dublin, 1745-1820: A Calendar of Performances, Volume 6. Lexington Books, 2011.
- Hogle, Jerrold E. The Cambridge Companion to Gothic Fiction. Cambridge University Press, 2002.
- Nicoll, Allardyce. A History of English Drama 1660–1900: Volume IV. Cambridge University Press, 2009.
