= William Sotheby =

English poet and translator (1756-1833)

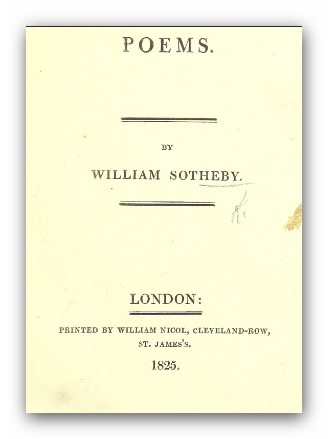
Poems by William Sotheby, 1825

William Sotheby FRS (9 November 1756 – 30 December 1833) was an English poet and translator. He was born into a wealthy London family, the son of Col. William and Elizabeth (née Sloan) Sotheby, and was educated at Harrow School and the Military Academy, Angers, France before joining the army at 17, where he served for six years until his marriage in 1780, when he devoted himself to literature.

Sotheby then became a prominent figure in London literary society. His wealth enabled him to play the part of patron to many struggling authors, and his friends included Walter Scott, Byron, Wordsworth, Coleridge, Robert Southey, Arthur Hallam, and Thomas Moore.

He published a few dramas and books of poems that had limited success; his reputation rests upon his translations of the Oberon of Christoph Martin Wieland, the Georgics of Virgil, and the Iliad and Odyssey by Homer. The last two were begun when he was over 70, but he lived to complete them. His Georgics in particular advanced his reputation and was praised in the Edinburgh Review as, if not "the most perfect translation of a classic poet now extant in our language, it is assuredly capable of being advanced to that high distinction". His 1801 play Julian and Agnes was acted at the Theatre Royal, Drury Lane with John Philip Kemble and Sarah Siddons in the lead roles.

He was elected a fellow of the Royal Society in November 1794.

Sotheby died in London in 1833 and was buried in Hackney churchyard. Joanna Baillie, a close friend of Sotheby's for "nearly thirty years" mourned his death: "A more generous, high-minded, amiable man never lived, and this, taken together with his great talents & acquirements, makes a Character which cannot be replaced."

== Family ==
In 1780 he married Mary née Isted and they had ten children, among them:

- Lt-Col. William Sotheby (c. 1781–1815)
- Rear-Adm. Charles Sotheby (c. 1782–1854)
- George Sotheby EICo (1787–1817) died at Nagpur in the Maharatta war
- Hans Sotheby EICo (c. 1780–1827)
- Col. Frederick Sotheby CB (c. 1780–1870)
