= Charles Sotheby =

Royal Navy officer (died 1854)

Rear-Admiral Charles Sotheby
- Died: 26 January 1854
- Father: William Sotheby
- Military career
- Allegiance: Kingdom of Great Britain; United Kingdom
- Branch: Royal Navy
- Service years: 1798–1854
- Rank: Rear-Admiral
- Commands: HMS Pilot; HMS Latona; HMS Tamar; HMS Seringapatam
- Conflicts: French Revolutionary Wars; Battle of the Nile; Blockade of Malta; Fort Saint Elmo; Anglo-Turkish War (1807–09); Napoleonic Wars; Walcheren Campaign

Charles Sotheby (died 1854) was an officer in the Royal Navy who served during the French Revolutionary and Napoleonic Wars, eventually rising to the rank of rear admiral. Sotheby was present as a midshipman at the Battle of the Nile in 1798, serving aboard the 74-gun HMS Alexander, and took part in the Siege of Malta and subsequent operations in Egypt in 1801. Sotheby was made acting lieutenant on the 36-gun frigate HMS Penelope in October 1801, an appointment that was confirmed in January the following year. He served in that capacity in the English Channel and North Sea. In April 1807, he joined HMS Thetis for service in the Anglo-Turkish War.

Sotheby received his first command in March 1809 when he was appointed to the 18-gun HMS Pilot, in which he joined the Walcheren Campaign in July. He commissioned HMS Latona in July 1810 for service, en flûte, on the Lisbon station and in the Mediterranean. On 1 October 1814, he transferred to HMS Tamar and commanded her in the Americas and later on the Cape of Good Hope Station. He returned to the Mediterranean in May 1824, in command of the 32-gun frigate HMS Seringapatam, where he fought a three-year campaign against piracy. Sotheby attained flag rank on 20 March 1848 and rose steadily through the ranks until his death on 26 January 1854.

== Career ==
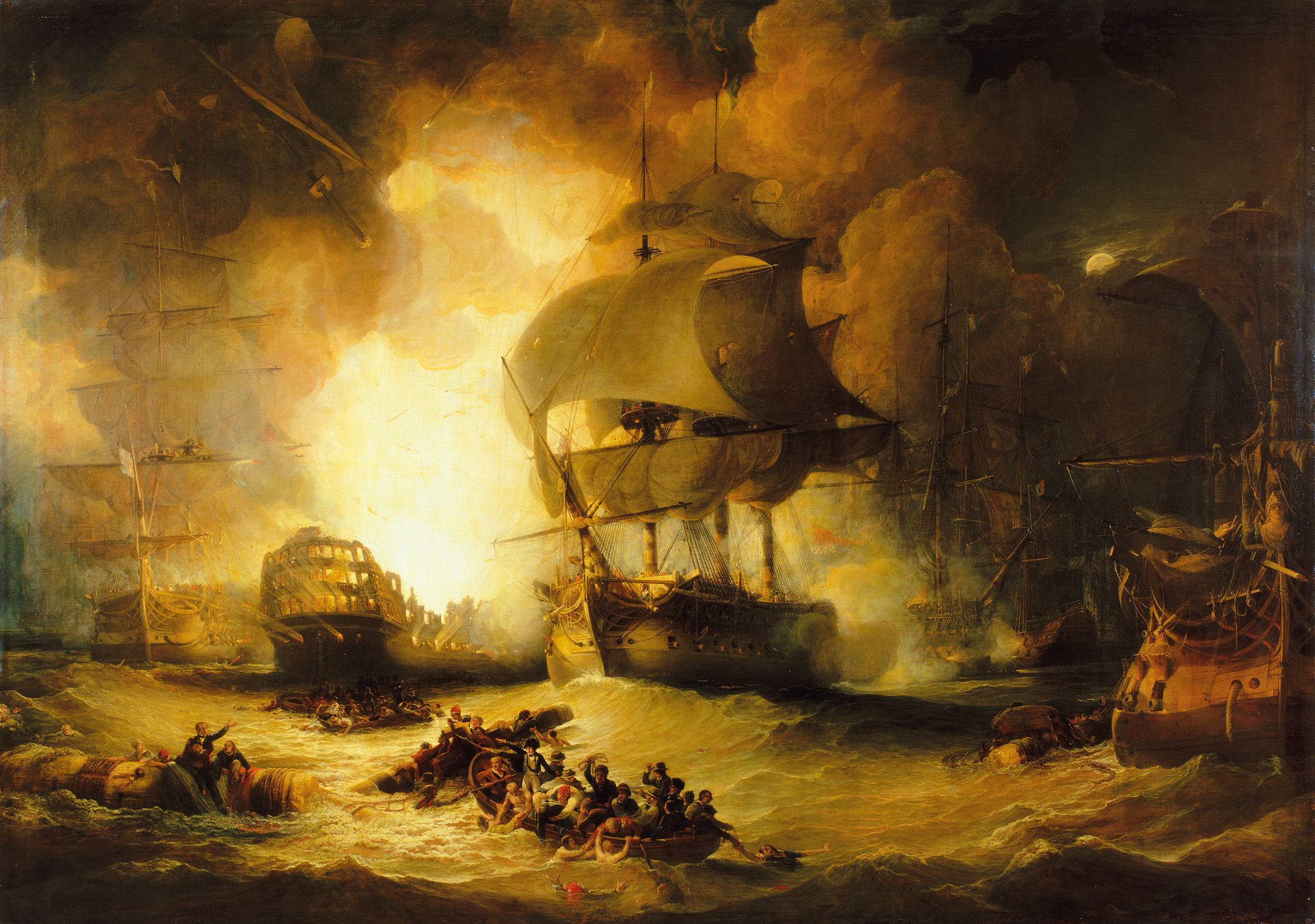
Orient explodes at the Battle of the Nile. Sotheby, aboard Alexander, was one of the closest British seaman to the blast

Sotheby entered the Royal Naval Academy on 5 September 1795. On 31 March 1798, he enrolled as a first-class volunteer on the 74-gun HMS Alexander (1778), under Captain Alexander Ball and was serving aboard as a midshipman when she took part in the Battle of the Nile in 1798. Alexander was returning from a scouting mission when the battle began and was late getting into the action. The last British ship to engage, she attacked the 110-gun first-rate French Orient shortly after arriving, and was in close proximity when Orient exploded. Wreckage from the explosion landed on Alexander's deck, starting fires, which were quickly extinguished by her crew.

Sotheby was aboard Alexander during the blockade of Malta and received a share of the prize money for his part in the chase and eventual capture of the French ships Genereux and Ville de Marseilles on 18 February 1800. At dawn, Alexander was to the south-east of the island when her lookouts sighted a French convoy sailing along the Maltese coast towards Valletta. She immediately gave chase and was soon joined by three more British ships. At 08:00, Alexander overhauled the armed transport Ville de Marseille, compelling her to surrender. The other smaller vessels made out to sea but Généreux was unable to follow without coming into conflict with Alexander. She instead bore up at 13:30, and held her position in order to protect her fleeing compatriots. She was engaged by a British frigate and when two other ships came within range at 16:30, she struck. Sotheby served ash/ore as aide-de-camp to Ball during the siege of Fort Saint Elmo and for a while after the island surrendered in September.

Sotheby was transferred to Lord Keith's flagship, the 80-gun HMS Foudroyant, on 12 December 1800 and served aboard her during the operations against French forces in Egypt in 1801. On 21 October 1801, Sotheby was made acting lieutenant on the 36-gun frigate HMS Penelope, serving under Captain Henry Blackwood, and later, Captain William Robert Broughton. His promotion was confirmed on 25 January 1802 when he received his lieutenant's commission. Penelope returned to home waters in 1803 and served in the North Sea. Later that year, Sotheby joined the 98-gun HMS Princess Royal in the English Channel.

Sotheby moved to HMS Thetis on 25 April 1807 and took part in operations against the Ottoman Empire during the Anglo-Turkish War. On 18 October 1808, Sotheby joined the 64-gun HMS Trident and served as Flag Lieutenant at Malta once more, to his former captain, now Rear Admiral, Ball.

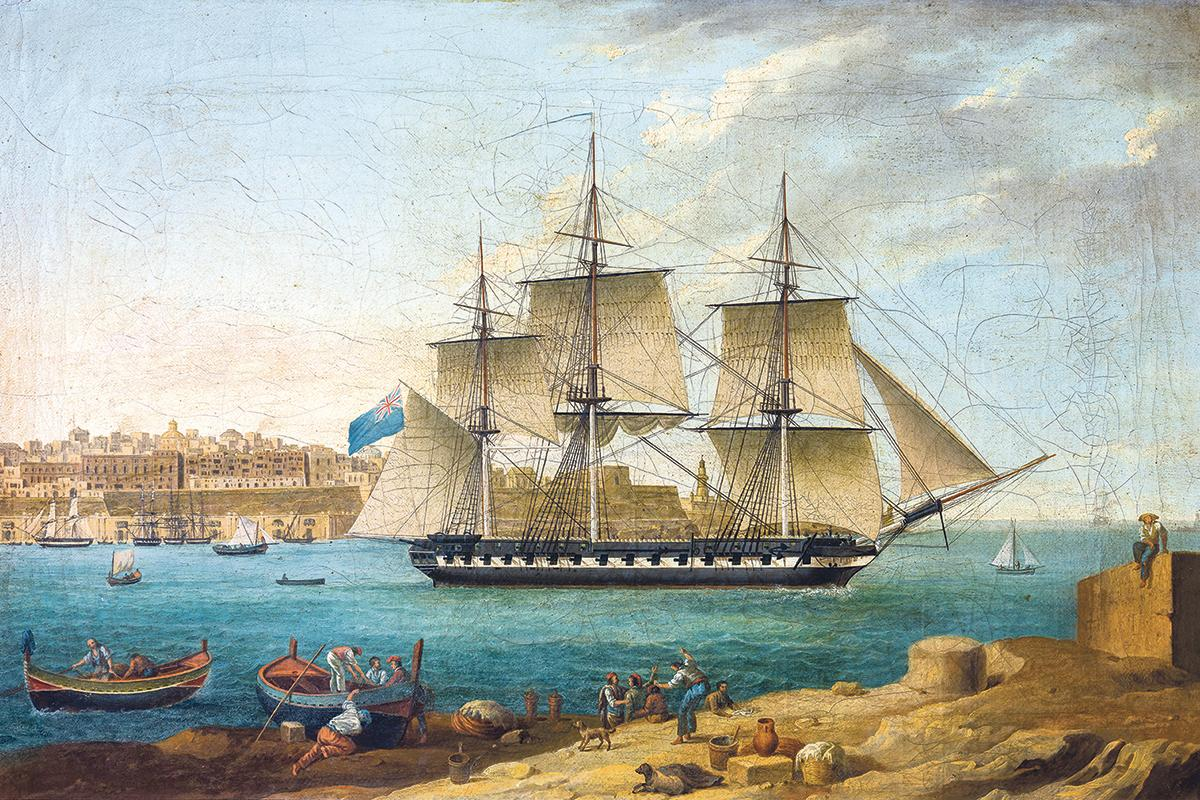
Sotheby's frigate, HMS Seringapatam, moored in Valletta harbour

Sotheby's first command came in March 1809 when he was appointed acting commander of the 18-gun HMS Pilot, in which he returned to England before taking part in the Walcheren Campaign in July. His command was ratified on 8 January 1810 and in July he commissioned the newly converted HMS Latona. She was posted to the Lisbon station in February 1812, serving en flûte, there and in the Mediterranean. On 21 August 1814 he was briefly appointed to HMS Slaney in the River Medway; transferring to HMS Tamar on 1 October. Sotheby served on the North America Station, South America Station and Cape of Good Hope Station until 27 March 1816.

On 18 May 1824, Sotheby took command of the 32-gun frigate HMS Seringapatam for a three-year service in the Mediterranean where he played an active part in the suppression of piracy in the Aegean Sea. In May 1825, Egyptian soldiers forcibly entered the British consul's home and removed a large sum of money. The Bey of Rhodes refused to compensate for loss and so Sotheby in Seringapatam, accompanied by the brig, HMS Alacrity, moored opposite the town and fired upon the Bey's house. Shortly after, restitution was received. On 9 June, Sotheby's squadron, comprising Seringapatam, Cambrian and Alacrity, captured a piratical mistico. Then on 31 January 1825, Seringapatam, this time in company with Cambrian and Cyrene, destroyed two pirate vessels. Two more were encountered and destroyed by Sotheby's ship, on 5 September 1826.

Sotheby attained flag rank on 20 March 1848, when he was promoted to Rear-Admiral of the Blue. He rose through the ranks, becoming Rear-admiral of the White on 6 November 1850 and Rear-admiral of the Red, 2 April 1853, until his death on 26 January 1854.

== Family ==
Charles Sotheby was one of ten children, seven of them sons, born to William Sotheby and his wife Mary (née Isted). His older brother, William, a lieutenant-colonel in the foot-guards, died in 1815 leaving Charles the eldest child. Two years later, his younger brother, while serving in the East India Company, was killed on 27 November 1817, defending the residency at Nagpoore during the Third Anglo-Maratha War. William's third son, Hans, was also in the service of the company until his death in 1827. Charles' youngest brother, Frederick, was a colonel in the Bengal artillery and died in 1870.

Sotheby married twice. On 15 February 1819, he wed Lady Jane Hamilton, the third daughter of William Hamilton, the seventh Lord Belhaven and Stenton. She died 18 September 1820. On 18 November 1830, he remarried to Mary Anne, the daughter of Admiral Thomas Sotheby (1759–1831) and his second wife, Lady Mary Anne.
