= HMS Druid (1825) =

Frigate of the Royal Navy

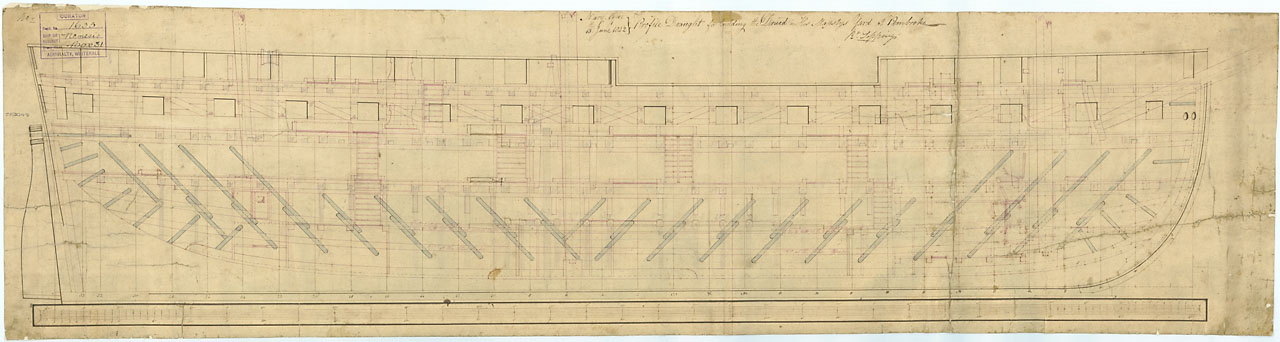

History

United Kingdom
- Name: Druid
- Namesake: Druid
- Ordered: 23 July 1817
- Builder: Pembroke Dockyard
- Laid down: August 1821
- Launched: 1 July 1825
- Completed: 21 December 1825
- Commissioned: July 1825
- Reclassified: As quarantine ship, 1846
- Fate: Sold for scrap, 13 April 1863

General characteristics
- Class & type: Seringapatam-class frigate
- Tons burthen: 1168 42/94 bm
- Length: 159 ft 6 in (48.6 m) (gundeck); 133 ft 5 in (40.7 m) (keel)
- Beam: 41 ft 1 in (12.5 m)
- Draught: 15 ft 4 in (4.7 m)
- Depth: 12 ft 9 in (3.9 m)
- Sail plan: Full-rigged ship
- Complement: 315
- Armament: 46 guns: Upper gundeck: 28 × 18-pdr cannon; Quarterdeck: 14 × 32-pdr carronades; Forecastle: 2 × 9-pdr cannon and 2 × 32-pdr carronades

HMS Druid was a 46-gun Seringapatam-class fifth-rate frigate built for the Royal Navy during the 1820s, the name ship of her sub-class.

== Description ==
The Druid sub-class was an enlarged and improved version of the Serinapatam design, modified with a circular stern. Druid had a length at the gundeck of 159 feet 6 inches (48.6 m) and 133 feet 5 inches (40.7 m) at the keel. She had a beam of 41 feet 1 inch (12.5 m), a draught of 15 feet 4 inches (4.7 m) and a depth of hold of 12 feet 9 inches (3.9 m). The ship's tonnage was 1168 42/94 tons burthen. Druid was armed with twenty-eight 18-pounder cannon on her gundeck, fourteen 32-pounder carronades on her quarterdeck and a pair of 9-pounder cannon and two more 32-pounder carronades in the forecastle. The ship had a crew of 315 officers and ratings.

== Construction and career ==
Druid, the fourth ship of her name to serve in the Royal Navy, was ordered on 23 July 1817, laid down in August 1821 at Pembroke Dockyard, Wales, and launched on 1 July 1825. She was commissioned that same month and completed at Plymouth Dockyard on 21 December 1825.

On 6 January 1831 Druid was at Rio de Janeiro. There she took on the mail for England that the Post Office Packet Service packet HMS Zephyr (1823) had brought from Buenos Aires and Montevideo. Zephyr had come with the mails from Buenos Aires and Montevideo and would be delayed at Rio for some days while repairing a broken mast.

On 25 August 1839 Druid sailed from England to Sydney with Captain Hobson RN, who was tasked with negotiating an agreement with the natives of New Zealand about its settlement by English settlers. It arrived at Sydney on 24 December 1839. The Druid then sailed for China on 23 or 24 January 1840.

Druid saw active service in the First Opium War. In early June 1840, its commander Lord Henry John Spencer-Churchill, youngest son of the Duke of Marlborough, died on board off the coast of Macao. The cause of death was recorded as "congestion of the brain" complicated by dysentery.
