= HMS Stag (1830) =

Frigate of the Royal Navy

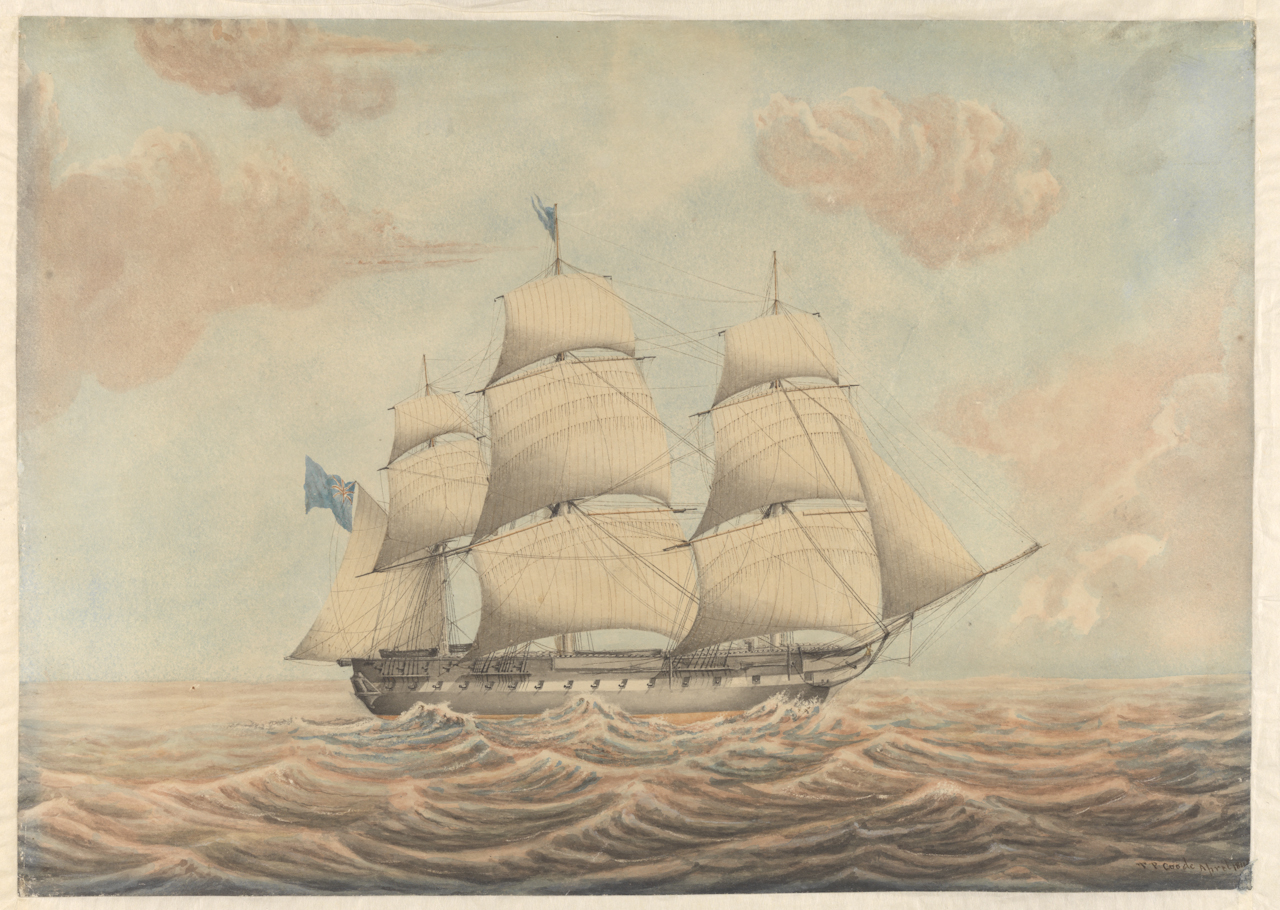
- Stag

History

United Kingdom
- Name: Stag
- Namesake: Stag
- Ordered: 9 January 1823
- Builder: Pembroke Dockyard
- Laid down: April 1828
- Launched: 2 October 1830
- Completed: 9 July 1831
- Commissioned: 15 April 1831
- Fate: Broken up by 8 August 1866

General characteristics
- Class & type: Seringapatam-class frigate
- Tons burthen: 1218 40/94 bm
- Length: 159 ft 3 in (48.5 m) (gundeck); 133 ft 3 in (40.6 m) (keel)
- Beam: 42 ft (12.8 m)
- Draught: 14 ft 8 in (4.5 m)
- Depth: 13 ft 3 in (4.0 m)
- Sail plan: Full-rigged ship
- Complement: 315
- Armament: 44 guns: Upper gundeck: 26 × 18-pdr cannon; Quarterdeck: 10 × 32-pdr carronades; 2 × 68-pounder guns; Forecastle: 4 × 32-pdr carronades

HMS Stag was a 44-gun Seringapatam-class fifth-rate frigate built for the Royal Navy during the 1820s, one of three ships of the Andromeda sub-class.

== Description ==
The Andromeda sub-class was a slightly enlarged and improved version of the Druid sub-class, with a more powerful armament. Stag had a length at the gundeck of 159 feet 3 inches (48.5 m) and 133 feet 3 inches (40.6 m) at the keel. She had a beam of 42 feet (12.8 m), a draught of 14 feet 8 inches (4.5 m) and a depth of hold of 13 feet 3 inches (4.0 m). The ship's tonnage was 1167 42/94 tons burthen. The Andromeda sub-class was armed with twenty-six 18-pounder cannon on her gundeck, ten 32-pounder carronades and a pair of 68-pounder guns on her quarterdeck and four more 32-pounder carronades in the forecastle. The ships had a crew of 315 officers and ratings.

== Construction and career ==
Stag, the fourth ship of her name to serve in the Royal Navy, was ordered on 9 January 1823, laid down in April 1828 at Pembroke Dockyard, Wales, and launched on 2 October 1830. She was completed for ordinary at Plymouth Dockyard in October 1830. The ship was commissioned on 15 April 1831 and ready for sea by 9 July.
