= HMS Seahorse (1830) =

Frigate of the Royal Navy

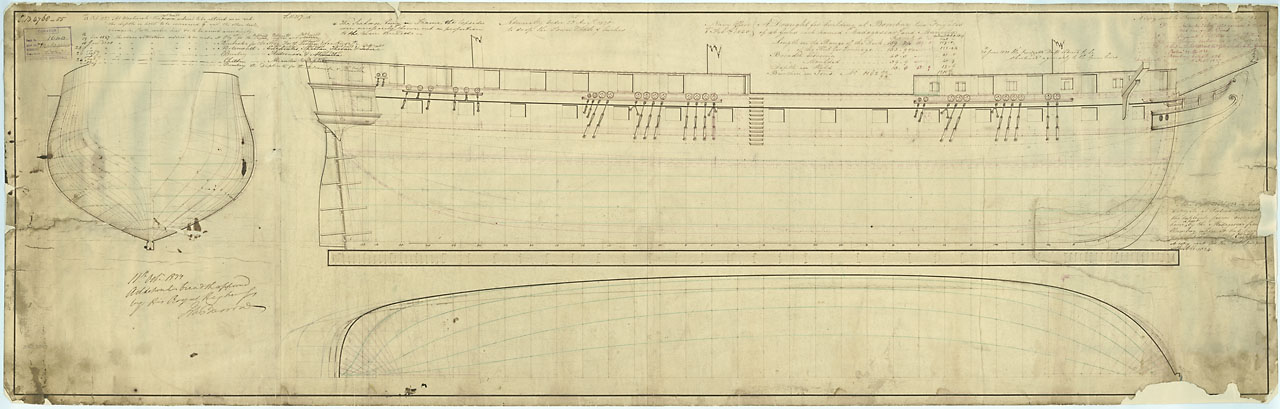
- Seahorse

History

United Kingdom
- Name: Seahorse
- Namesake: Seahorse
- Ordered: 9 January 1823
- Builder: Pembroke Dockyard
- Laid down: November 1826
- Launched: 22 July 1830
- Fate: Sold for scrap, 1902

General characteristics
- Class & type: Seringapatam-class frigate
- Tons burthen: 1218 40/94 bm
- Length: 159 ft 3 in (48.5 m) (gundeck); 133 ft 3 in (40.6 m) (keel)
- Beam: 42 ft (12.8 m)
- Draught: 14 ft 8 in (4.5 m)
- Depth: 13 ft 3 in (4.0 m)
- Sail plan: Full-rigged ship

HMS Seahorse was a 44-gun Seringapatam-class fifth-rate frigate built for the Royal Navy during the 1820s, one of three ships of the Andromeda sub-class. After completion in 1830, she was ordered to be converted into a steam-powered ship in 1845, but this did not happen for another decade.

== Description ==
The Andromeda sub-class was a slightly enlarged and improved version of the Druid sub-class, with a more powerful armament. Seahorse had a length at the gundeck of 159 feet 10 inches (48.7 m) and 133 feet 4 inches (40.6 m) at the keel. She had a beam of 41 feet 10 inches (12.8 m), a draught of 14 feet 10 inches (4.5 m) and a depth of hold of 13 feet 3 inches (4.0 m). The ship's tonnage was 1211 53/94 tons burthen. The Andromeda sub-class was armed with twenty-six 18-pounder cannon on her gundeck, ten 32-pounder carronades and a pair of 68-pounder guns on her quarterdeck and four more 32-pounder carronades in the forecastle. The ships had a crew of 315 officers and ratings.

== Construction and career ==
Seahorse, the ninth ship of her name to serve in the Royal Navy, was ordered on 9 January 1823, laid down in November 1826 at Pembroke Dockyard, Wales, and launched on 22 July 1830. She was completed for ordinary at Plymouth Dockyard in August 1830 and completely roofed over.
