= HMS Seringapatam (1819) =

British ship

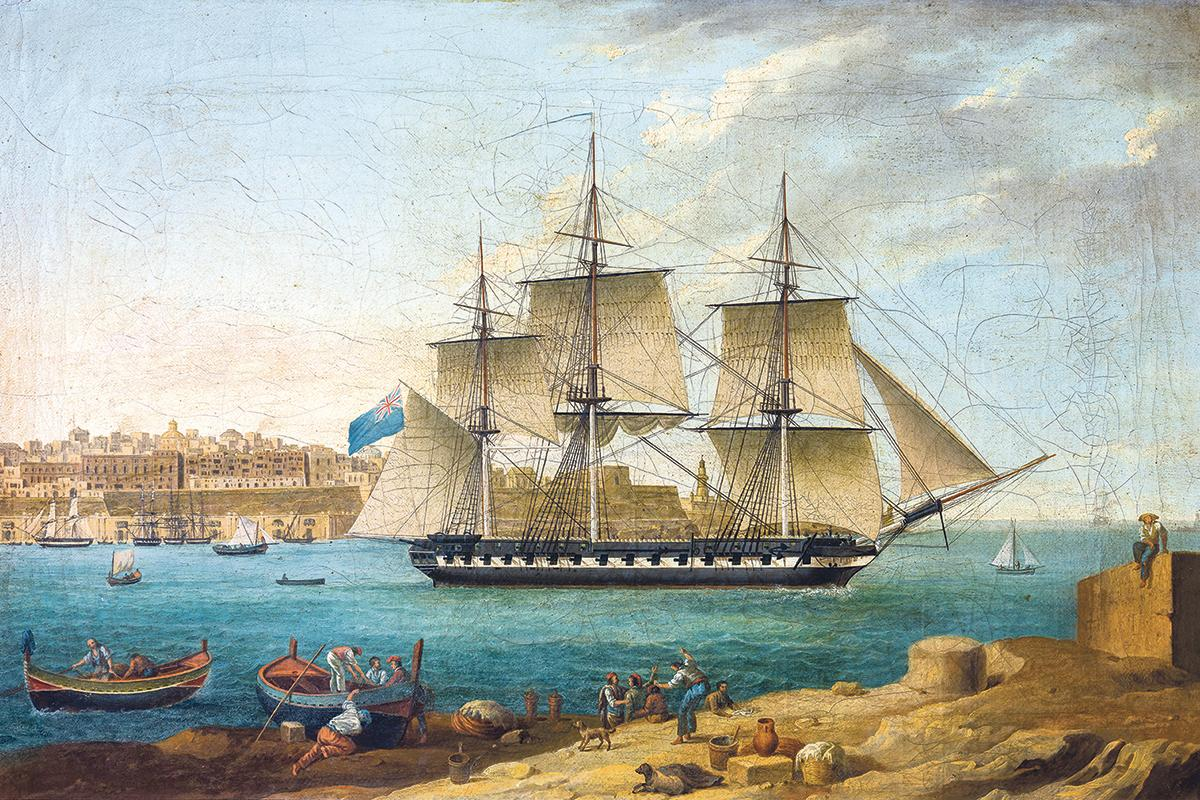
- Seringapatam in the Grand Harbour, Malta, c. 1826, by Anton Schranz

History

United Kingdom of Great Britain and Ireland
- Name: Seringapatam
- Namesake: Seringapatam
- Ordered: August 1813
- Builder: Bombay Dockyard and Plymouth Dockyard
- Laid down: November 1817
- Launched: 5 September 1819
- Completed: April 1821
- Commissioned: November 1820
- Reclassified: as store ship, 1848; as coal hulk, 1858; as Receiving Ship at Cape of Good Hope, 1861.
- Fate: Sold for scrap, broken up 1873

General characteristics
- Class & type: Seringapatam-class frigate
- Tons burthen: 1152 tons
- Sail plan: Full-rigged ship
- Armament: 46 guns

HMS Seringapatam was a 46-gun Seringapatam-class fifth-rate frigate built for the Royal Navy between 1817 and 1821, the name ship of her class.

== Design ==
Seringapatam's design was based on that of the light French frigate Président, captured by HMS Despatch of the Royal Navy in a skirmish in the Bay of Biscay on 27 September 1806, to become HMS President. The intention was to establish a new class of frigate for use after the Napoleonic Wars, supplementing the Leda class, but the result was disappointing, and major revisions to the design led to sub-classes.

Seringapatam was originally ordered as a 38-gun frigate, but in February 1817 the re-classification of British warships raised this rating to 46-gun.

== Name ==
While Seringapatam was the first ship of this name to serve in the Royal Navy, an earlier Seringapatam had been built by Tipu Sultan of Mysore and seized by the East India Company after the Siege of Seringapatam of 1799. This ship was sold as a whaler and was in use as such between 1800 and 1843.

== Construction ==
The new ship was ordered by the Admiralty in 1813, laid down in November 1817 at the Royal Navy's Bombay Dockyard in British India, and launched on 5 September 1819. In 1820 she was sailed to England from Bombay under the command of Captain William Walpole, and taken to Plymouth Dockyard. There she was commissioned in November 1820, when Captain Samuel Warren was given command of her, and completed in April 1821. Warren had previously been the master of HMS President.

== Career ==
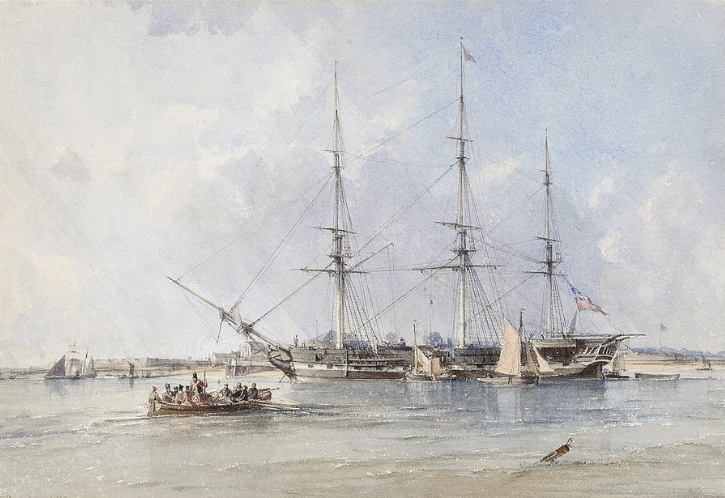
Seringapatam off Tilbury Fort, by George Chambers

In the spring and summer of 1822, Seringapatam was on duty in the Mediterranean under the command of Warren. On 7 May she passed the island of Chios (then called in English Scio), saw it in flames, and received signals from Greek ships asking for help, but being under orders to observe strict neutrality in the Greek War of Independence the ship gave no assistance and proceeded on her way. She arrived at Corfu on 8 June, from where she sailed on to Portsmouth, arriving there on 24 July.

In the summer of 1823, the frigate took Sir Benjamin Bloomfield, the new British envoy to Sweden, to Stockholm. Warren retained command until February 1824. Later that year, Seringapatam, now under the command of Charles Sotheby, was again posted to the Mediterranean, this time as part of a small anti-piracy squadron working in the Aegean Islands, off Alexandria, and around the coasts of Syria. With HMS Cambrian and Cyrene, she shared in the destruction of a Greek pirate ship on 31 January 1825, and another on 9 June of that year, with the result that her men received prize money.

Later during the Greek War of Independence, on 8 August 1826 Seringapatam sailed from Malta with HMS Parthian in a convoy for Smyrna and the Dardanelles, and they were in Smyrna on 19 September.

The ship was commanded by Captain William Waldegrave from 1829 and served in the Pacific from May 1830 to April 1832. In his Extracts from a Private Journal Kept on Board H. M. S. Seringapatam, in the Pacific (1830), Waldegrave reported on the ship’s visits to Nuku Hiva in the Marquesas, where he was disgusted by the natives' extreme promiscuity, Otaheite in the Society Islands, where he noted that the ruling Queen Pōmare was "sixteen years of age... but has no children", and to Raiatea, Tongatapu, Vavaʻu, and the Friendly Islands.

From 1837 to 1841, the ship's master was Captain John Leith and she was on the Barbados station. In January 1843, she was taken out of commission at Sheerness. In April 1848 she was in use as a store ship, under a master named Russell, in Simon's Bay, Cape Colony. In June 1854, during the Crimean War, she returned to active service with the Royal Navy under the command of Commodore Henry Dundas Trotter, Commander-in-chief at the Cape of Good Hope. In 1858 Seringapatam was reported to be serving as a coal hulk at Simon's Bay, but she was reclassified as a Receiving Ship at the Cape. From October 1861 she was under the command of Captain James Horsford Cockburn, and from May 1866 to July 1867 that of Commodore Henry Caldwell.

== Fate ==
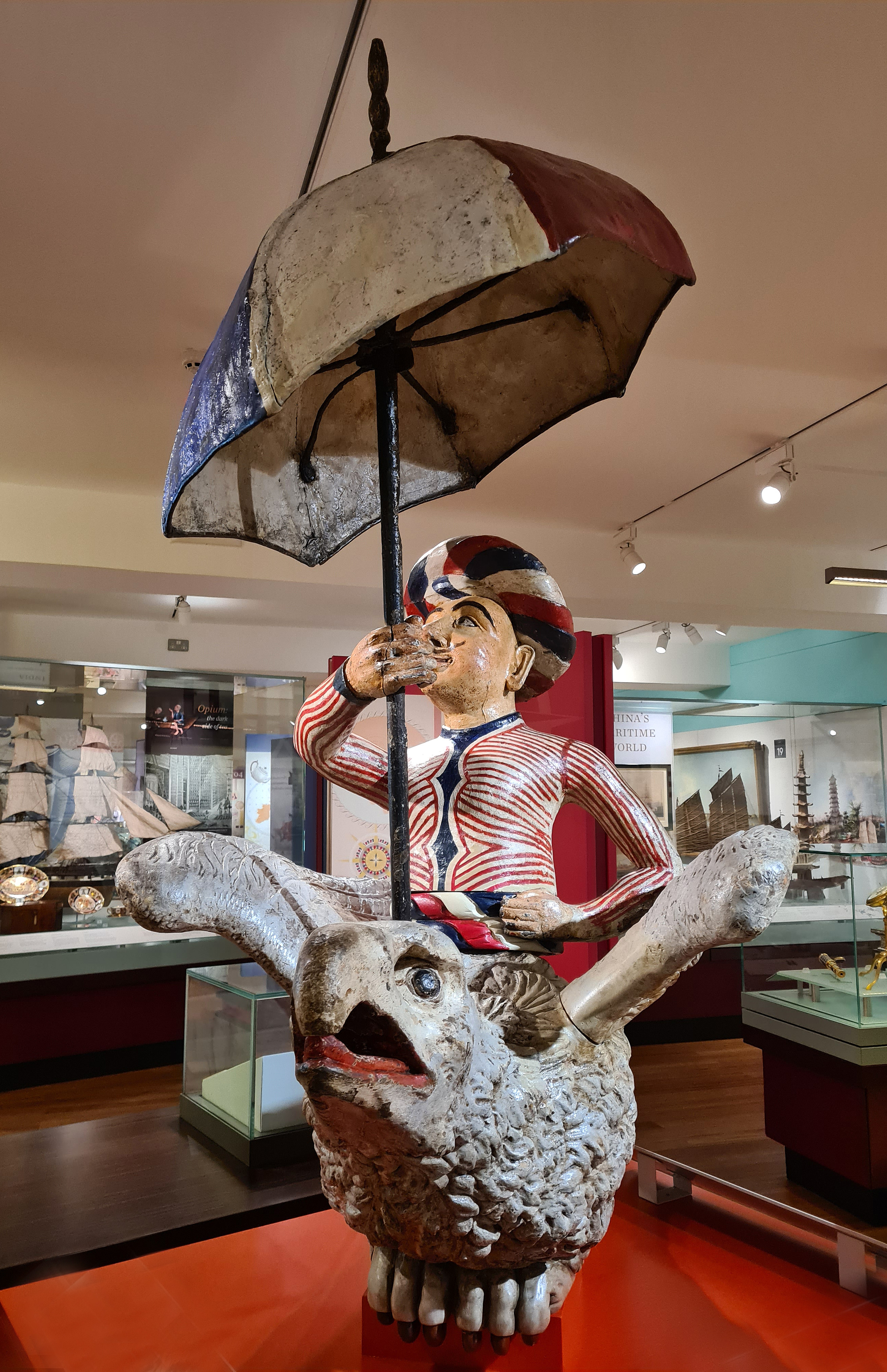
Figurehead from HMS Seringapatam (National Maritime Museum).

Sold for ship breaking, Seringapatam began to be broken up at the Cape in 1873. Her figurehead, showing a turbanned figure riding on a roc, a giant mythical bird, and holding in one hand a red, white, and blue umbrella, survives in the Royal Museums Greenwich.
