= HMS Forth (1833) =

Frigate of the Royal Navy

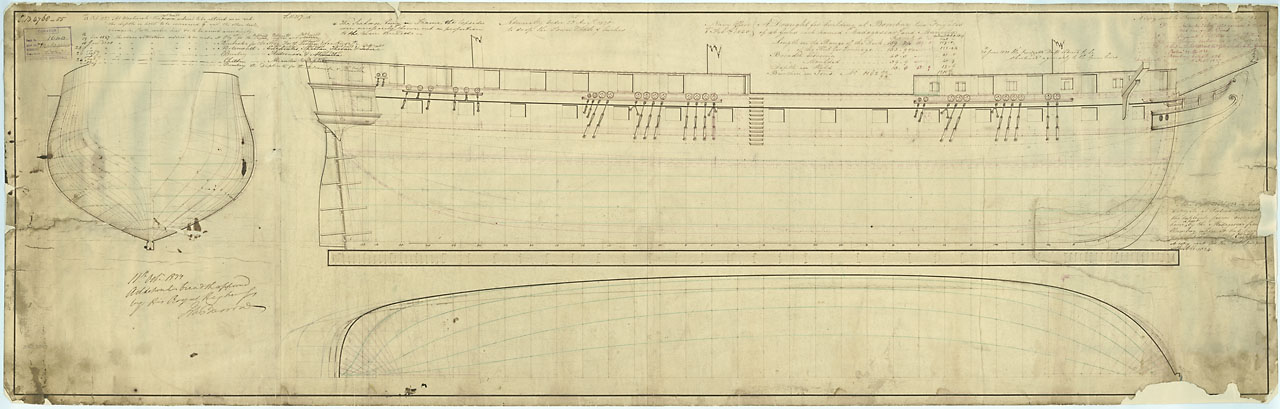
- Forth

History

United Kingdom
- Name: Forth
- Ordered: 9 June 1825
- Builder: Pembroke Dockyard
- Laid down: November 1828
- Launched: 1 August 1833
- Fate: Sold for scrap, 4 August 1883

General characteristics
- Class & type: Seringapatam-class frigate
- Tons burthen: 1218 40/94 bm
- Length: 159 ft 3 in (48.5 m) (gundeck); 133 ft 3 in (40.6 m) (keel)
- Beam: 42 ft (12.8 m)
- Draught: 14 ft 8 in (4.5 m)
- Depth: 13 ft 3 in (4.0 m)
- Sail plan: Full-rigged ship

HMS Forth was a 44-gun Seringapatam-class fifth-rate frigate built for the Royal Navy during the 1820s, one of three ships of the Andromeda sub-class. After completion in 1833, she was ordered to be converted into a steam-powered ship in 1845, but this did not happen for another decade.

== Description ==
The Andromeda sub-class was a slightly enlarged and improved version of the Druid sub-class, with a more powerful armament. Forth had a length at the gundeck of 159 feet (48.5 m) and 133 feet (40.5 m) at the keel. She had a beam of 42 feet 2 inches (12.9 m), a draught of 14 feet 8 inches (4.5 m) and a depth of hold of 13 feet 3 inches (4.0 m). The ship's tonnage was 1228 46/94 tons burthen. The Andromeda sub-class was armed with twenty-six 18-pounder cannon on her gundeck, ten 32-pounder carronades and a pair of 68-pounder guns on her quarterdeck and four more 32-pounder carronades in the forecastle. The ships had a crew of 315 officers and ratings.

== Construction and career ==
Forth, the second ship of her name to serve in the Royal Navy, was ordered on 9 June 1825, laid down in November 1828 at Pembroke Dockyard, Wales, and launched on 1 August 1830. She was completed for ordinary at Plymouth Dockyard on 2 September 1833.
