= James Cockburn (Royal Navy officer) =

Rear-Admiral James Cockburn
- Born: c. 1817
- Died: 10 February 1872
- Military career
- Allegiance: United Kingdom
- Branch: Royal Navy
- Rank: Rear-Admiral
- Commands: HMS Cossack; HMS Diadem; HMS Seringapatam; East Indies Station
- Conflicts: Crimean War

Rear-Admiral James Horsford Cockburn (1817 – 10 February 1872) was a Royal Navy officer who became Commander-in-Chief, East Indies Station.

== Naval career ==
Cockburn joined the Royal Navy in 1829. Promoted to captain in 1850, he commanded HMS Cossack in the Black Sea during the Crimean War, following by HMS Diadem and then HMS Seringapatam. He was appointed Commander-in-Chief, East Indies Station in 1870. He died in that office while travelling from Trincomalee to Calcutta in 1872.

== Family ==
In 1852 he married Harriet Emily Gedge; they had one son and seven daughters.

Military offices
Preceded by Sir Leopold Heath	Commander-in-Chief, East Indies Station; 1870–1872	Succeeded by Sir Arthur Cumming
