= HMS Leda (1828) =

Frigate of the Royal Navy

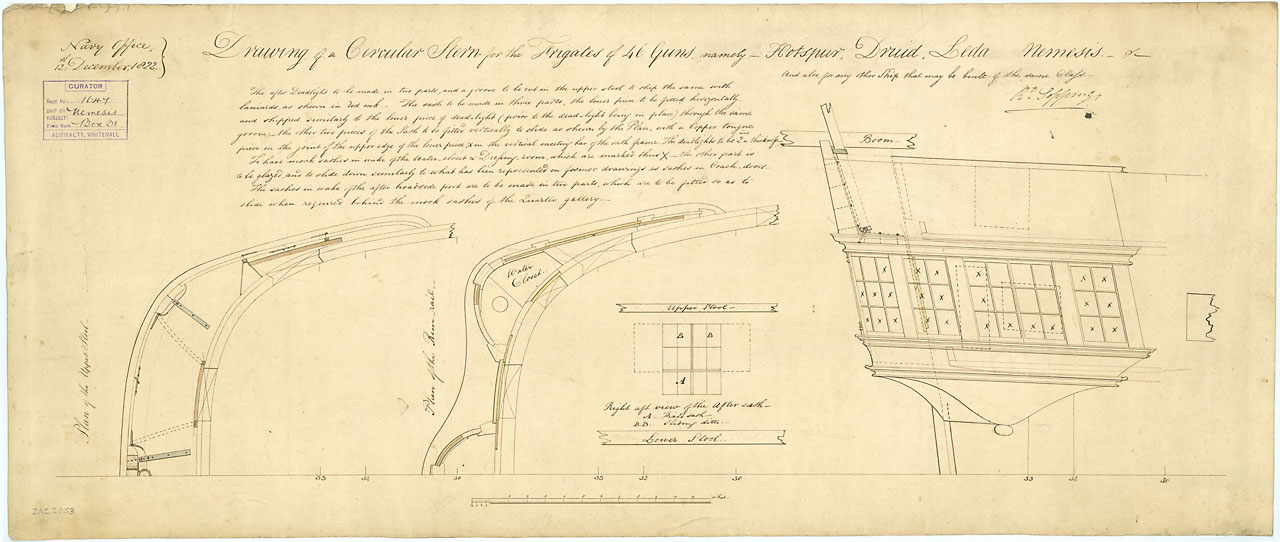
- Leda

History

United Kingdom
- Name: Leda
- Namesake: Leda
- Ordered: 15 May 1821
- Builder: Pembroke Dockyard
- Laid down: October 1824
- Launched: 15 April 1828
- Completed: May 1828
- Commissioned: Never
- Reclassified: As a water police ship, March 1865
- Fate: Sold for scrap, 15 May 1906

General characteristics
- Class & type: Seringapatam-class frigate
- Tons burthen: 1171 38/94 bm
- Length: 159 ft (48.5 m) (gundeck); 133 ft 5 in (40.7 m) (keel)
- Beam: 41 ft 2 in (12.5 m)
- Draught: 15 ft (4.6 m) (unloaded only)
- Depth: 12 ft 9 in (3.9 m)
- Sail plan: Full-rigged ship
- Complement: 315
- Armament: 46 guns: Upper gundeck: 28 × 18-pdr cannon; Quarterdeck: 14 × 32-pdr carronades; Forecastle: 2 × 9-pdr cannon and 2 × 32-pdr carronades

HMS Leda was a 46-gun Seringapatam-class fifth-rate frigate built for the Royal Navy during the 1820s, one of seven ships of the Druid sub-class.

== Description ==
The Druid sub-class was an enlarged and improved version of the Serinapatam design, modified with a circular stern. Leda had a length at the gundeck of 159 feet (48.5 m) and 133 feet 5 inches (40.7 m) at the keel. She had a beam of 41 feet 2 inches (12.5 m), a draught of 15 feet (4.6 m) and a depth of hold of 12 feet 9 inches (3.9 m). The ship's tonnage was 1171 38/94 tons burthen. The Druid sub-class was armed with twenty-eight 18-pounder cannon on her gundeck, fourteen 32-pounder carronades on her quarterdeck and a pair of 9-pounder cannon and two more 32-pounder carronades in the forecastle. The ships had a crew of 315 officers and ratings.

== Construction and career ==
Leda, the fourth ship of her name to serve in the Royal Navy, was ordered on 15 May 1821, laid down in October 1824 at Pembroke Dockyard, Wales, and launched on 15 April 1828. She was completed for ordinary at Plymouth Dockyard in May 1828 and the ship was roofed over from the mainmast forward.
