= Miranda (1828 ship) =

1828 English ship

History

United Kingdom
- Name: Miranda
- Owner: 1828:Drew & Co.; 1830:Fry & Co.; Later:Bosquanquet; 1843: Manning & Co.; 1848:Carter & Co.
- Launched: 1828, Bristol
- Fate: Broken up circa 1851

General characteristics
- Tons burthen: 300, or 30014/94 (bm)
- Length: 98 ft 10 in (30.1 m)
- Beam: 29 ft 0 1/2 in (8.9 m)
- Sail plan: Barque; Ship (1839–1843)

Miranda was launched in Bristol in 1828. In 1829–1830 she made one voyage to Bengal, sailing under a licence from the British East India Company (EIC). On her return she became a West Indiaman, sailing to Jamaica and Antigua. She was broken up around 1851.

== Career ==
Miranda transferred her registry to London on 3 June 1830. She first appeared in Lloyd's Registry (LR) in 1829.

Year	Master	Owner	Trade	Source
1829		R.Drew & Co.	London–Calctta	LR
1830	Currie	R.Drew; Fry & Co.	London–Calcutta	LR

In 1813 the EIC had lost its monopoly on the trade between India and Britain. British ships were then free to sail to India or the Indian Ocean under a licence from the EIC.

On 29 February 1829 Miranda, J.Dalgarno, master, sailed from London for Mauritius and Ceylon under a license from the EIC. Ship arrival and departure data show Miranda leaving London on 4 March, and Mauritius on 13 July, and arriving at Calcutta on 16 August. On 19 September she sailed for London via Mauritius. She arrived at Mauritius on 1 December.

Year	Master	Owner	Trade	Source
1831	Currie	Fry & Co.	London–Jamaica	LR
1836	Sowell	Fry & Co.	Plymouth–West Indies	LR

On 19 February 1828 Miranda, Sowell, master, was among the vessels that put into the Isles of Scilly after having been caught in a gale a few days earlier. Miranda's pumps were chocked and her ballast had shifted. She was on a voyage from London to Antigua.

On 26 May Miranda, Sowell, master, was run into by a large vessel during a fog and sustained some damage. She arrived at the Start from Antigua on 16 June.

Year	Master	Owner	Trade	Source & notes
1843	Sowell; Johnson	Bosquanquet; Manning	London–Antigua	LR; small repairs 1843
1845	Johnson; G.Leonard	Manning	London–Antigua	LR; small repairs 1843

On 23 December 1846 Miranda, Leonard, master, came into Southampton Docks in a distressed state. She had been sailing from Antigua to London with 500 hogsheads of sugar and molasses. Captain Leonard decided to discharge the cargo rather than risk the passage to London.

Year	Master	Owner	Trade	Source & notes
1848	G.Leonard; Maxted	Manning; Carter & Co.	London–Antigua; London–West Indies	LR; small repairs 1843, 1847, and 1848

== Fate ==
The entry for Miranda in the 1851 issue of LR carried the annotation "broken up".
