= Hibernia (1828 ship) =

Passenger ship built at Prince Edward's Island in 1828

History

United Kingdom
- Name: Hibernia
- Launched: 1828, Murray Harbour, Prince Edward's Island
- Fate: Consumed by fire February 1833

General characteristics
- Type: Three Masted
- Tons burthen: 45661/94, or 480 (bm)
- Length: 117 ft 1 in (35.7 m)
- Beam: 30 ft 5 1/4 in (9.3 m)
- Propulsion: Sail
- Sail plan: Full-rigged ship

Hibernia was a passenger ship built at Prince Edward Island in 1828. She was transporting passengers from Liverpool to Australia when a shipboard fire in the South Atlantic (4°40′S 20°30′W) on 5 February 1833 destroyed her.

== Background ==
Hibernia had two decks, with poop and forecastle decks. She had three masts, a square stern, quarter quarter galleries, and a scroll head. She was registered at Bristol on 6 April 1829, with owner John Cambridge. Cambridge mortgaged her, but died. The mortgage holders died also, and the executors of his will and that of the executors of the holders, who were in bankruptcy when they died, sold Hibernia on 8 November 1832 to Edward Walkinshaw, a merchant of Liverpool.

Her first master was John Kemp. He sailed Hibernia between Bristol and Quebec. Then on 24 November 1832 William Brend assumed command at Liverpool.

== Loss ==
Hibernia initially sailed from Liverpool on 27 November, but needed to return for repairs caused by a storm. She left again on 6 December 1832, bound for the Cape of Good Hope, Van Diemen's Land, and Sydney. Her complement consisted of 209 passengers (79 males, 80 females, and 50 children), and 19 seamen and 4 apprentices; total 232.

A fire in the South Atlantic (4°40′S 20°30′W) on 5 February 1833 destroyed her. The fire was caused when second mate, Samuel Geddes, accidentally dropped a flame onto rum in the spirit room.

Of the 232 people on board the ship, 62 were rescued on 11 February by the convict ship Lotus, John Summerson, master, and delivered to Rio de Janeiro on 12 February. Nine more took to a pinnace and were rescued by the brig Isabella, Le Fere, master, and also delivered to Rio de Janeiro on 21 February. (Note: Isabella, of 229 tons (bm), Fleure (or J. John Flère), master, was a Guernsey ship, launched there in 1832, with owner J.Bonamy. She was on a voyage from Trieste.) All the remaining passengers and crew drowned. (Other accounts report 78 survivors.)
