= HMS Hotspur (1828) =

Frigate of the Royal Navy

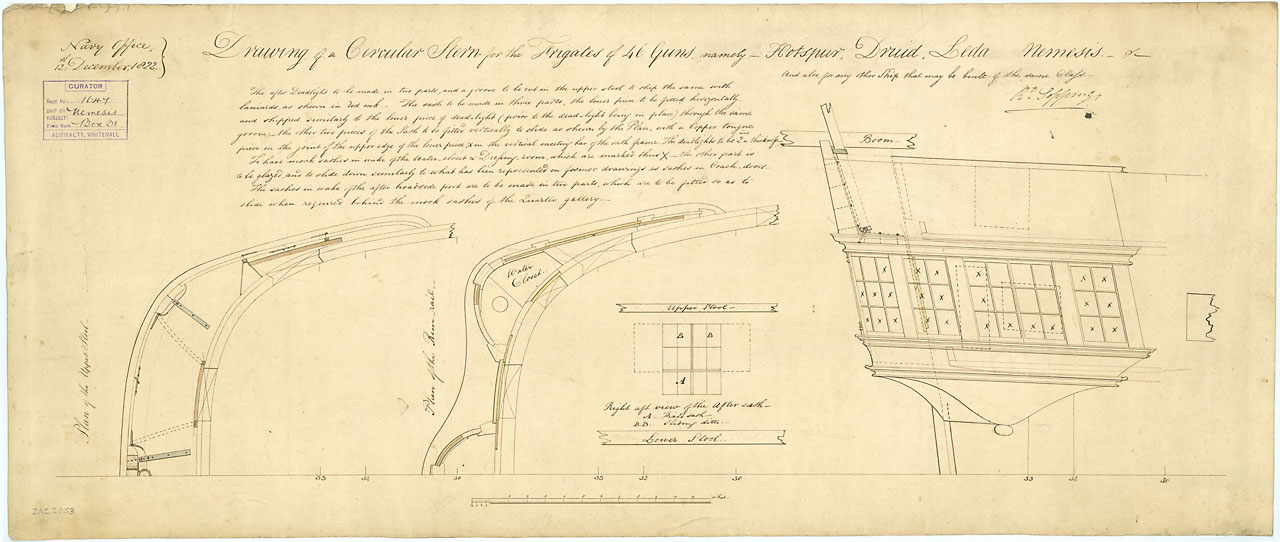
- Hotspur

History

United Kingdom
- Name: HMS Hotspur
- Ordered: 15 May 1821
- Builder: Pembroke Dockyard
- Laid down: July 1825
- Launched: 9 October 1828
- Renamed: Monmouth in 1868
- Fate: Sold in 1902

General characteristics
- Class & type: Modified Seringapatam-class frigate
- Tons burthen: 1,162 38/94 bm
- Length: 159 ft (48 m) (gundeck); 133 ft 8 in (40.74 m) (keel)
- Beam: 40 ft 5 in (12.32 m)
- Depth of hold: 12 ft 9 in (3.89 m)
- Sail plan: Full-rigged ship
- Complement: 315
- Armament: Upper deck: 28 × 18-pounder guns; Quarterdeck: 14 × 32-pdr carronades; Forecastle: 2 × 9 pdrs + 2 × 32-pdr carronades

HMS Hotspur was a modified Seringapatam-class 46-gun fifth rate frigate of the Royal Navy. She was built at Pembroke Dockyard and launched on 9 October 1828. She was laid up incomplete at Plymouth in April 1829. In 1859 she was recorded as being a chapel hulk based at HMNB Devonport – possibly moored at Hamoaze. She was recorded again in 1865, at the same location, as a Roman Catholic chapel hulk. She was renamed HMS Monmouth in 1868, and sold in 1902, after the Roman Catholic Church of Our Most Holy Redeemer was opened in Keyham.
