= Lotus (1826 ship) =

History

United Kingdom
- Name: Lotus
- Owner: Thos. Hutchinson, Henry Barrick, and Jos. Sampson (1837)
- Builder: T. Barrick, Whitby
- Launched: 1826, or 1827
- Fate: Lost 11 May 1844

General characteristics
- Tons burthen: 397 (bm)
- Propulsion: Sail

Lotus was a ship launched at Whitby, England in 1826. She made several voyages to Australia carrying emigrants. She made one voyage transporting convicts to Van Diemen's Land. On that voyage, in 1833, she rescued 61 survivors from Hibernia, which a fire had destroyed in the South Atlantic as Hibenia was carrying immigrants to Van Diemen's Land. Lotus herself was lost in May 1844, while sailing between Bristol and Quebec.

== Career ==
Lotus appeared in the Register of Shipping (RS) in 1828, with J.Bowes, master, Barrick, owner, and trade Whitby. She first appeared in Lloyd's Register (LR) in 1830, with Summerson, master, Barrick, owner, and trade London-Swan river.

=== Western Australia ===
On 1 June 1829, Lotus and her master, John Summerson, left England for the Swan River Colony. She arrived at Fremantle, Western Australia, on 6 October 1829. Discharged passengers 6–8 October 1829. Although some sources state that she was the sixth passenger vessel to arrive in Western Australia, many other ships preceded her at the Swan River colony.

=== Lotus and Hibernia ===
Lotus and her master left London on 30 December 1832.

Hibernia was lost on 5 February 1833, and Lotus picked up survivors on 11 February. She carried the survivors to Rio de Janeiro the next day. There, Adelaide, Clark, master, embarked them and brought them to Hobart.

Lotus arrived at Hobart on 16 May 1833. The surgeon-superintendent was Dr. Henry G. Brock. She brought 216 male prisoners. The guard was under the command of Major Shaw and Lieutenant Blair, and consisted of 29 soldiers from the 21st Regiment of Fusiliers. There were also ten passengers: Mrs. Shaw, eight children, and a female servant. (Note: Although accounts are clear that she was a convict ship, sources on convict voyages to Van Diemen's Land or Sydney, such as Bateson, fail to list her.)

== Fate ==
One report states that Lotus was wrecked c. 1837. However, LR for 1837, showed her having undergone repairs for damages and her trade changing from London–Quebec to Bristol–Quebec. Her master was J. Samson and her owner H. Barrick.

LR for 1845, showed Lotus with damages repaired in 1837, and small repairs in 1843 and 1844. It gave the name of her master as J.Samson, and of her owner as H.Barrick. Her trade was Bristol–Quebec. There is the annotation "LOST" by her name.

Lotus was damaged by ice in the Atlantic Ocean and foundered on 11 May 1844. Swallow rescued her crew. Lotus was on a voyage from Bristol to Quebec City.
