= HMS Nemesis (1826) =

Frigate of the Royal Navy

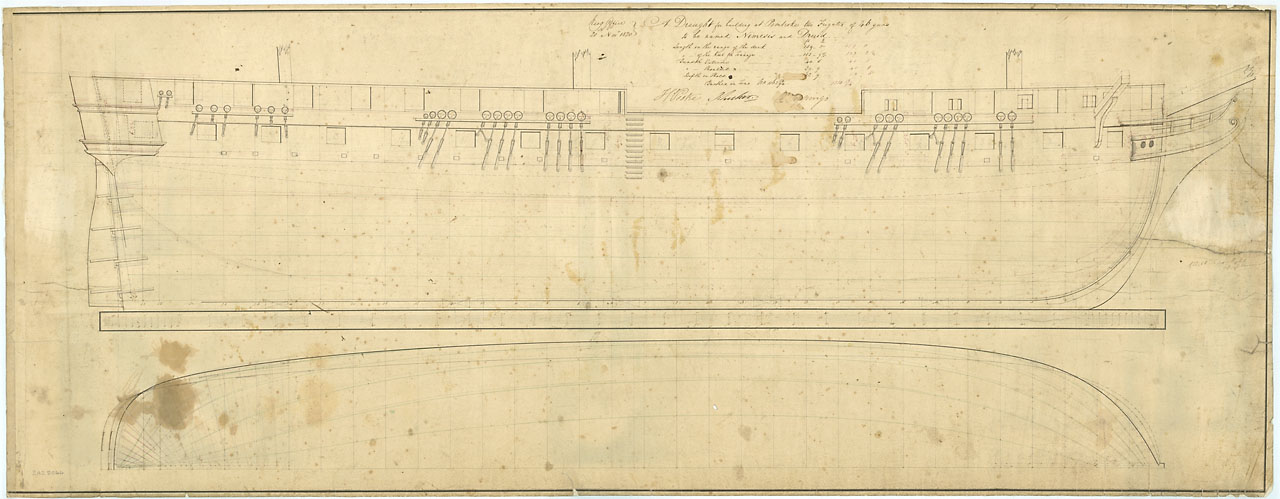
- Body plan of HMS Nemesis

History

United Kingdom
- Name: Nemesis
- Namesake: Nemesis
- Ordered: 23 July 1817
- Builder: Pembroke Dockyard
- Laid down: August 1823
- Launched: 19 August 1826
- Completed: September 1826
- Commissioned: Never
- Fate: Broken up by 4 July 1866

General characteristics
- Class & type: Seringapatam-class frigate
- Tons burthen: 1167 42/94 bm
- Length: 159 ft 1 in (48.5 m) (gundeck); 133 ft 2 in (40.6 m) (keel)
- Beam: 41 ft 1 in (12.5 m)
- Draught: 15 ft 1 in (4.6 m)
- Depth: 12 ft 9 in (3.9 m)
- Sail plan: Full-rigged ship
- Complement: 315
- Armament: 46 guns: Upper gundeck: 28 × 18-pdr cannon; Quarterdeck: 14 × 32-pdr carronades; Forecastle: 2 × 9-pdr cannon and 2 × 32-pdr carronades

HMS Nemesis was a 46-gun Seringapatam-class fifth-rate frigate built for the Royal Navy during the 1820s, one of four ships of the Druid sub-class.

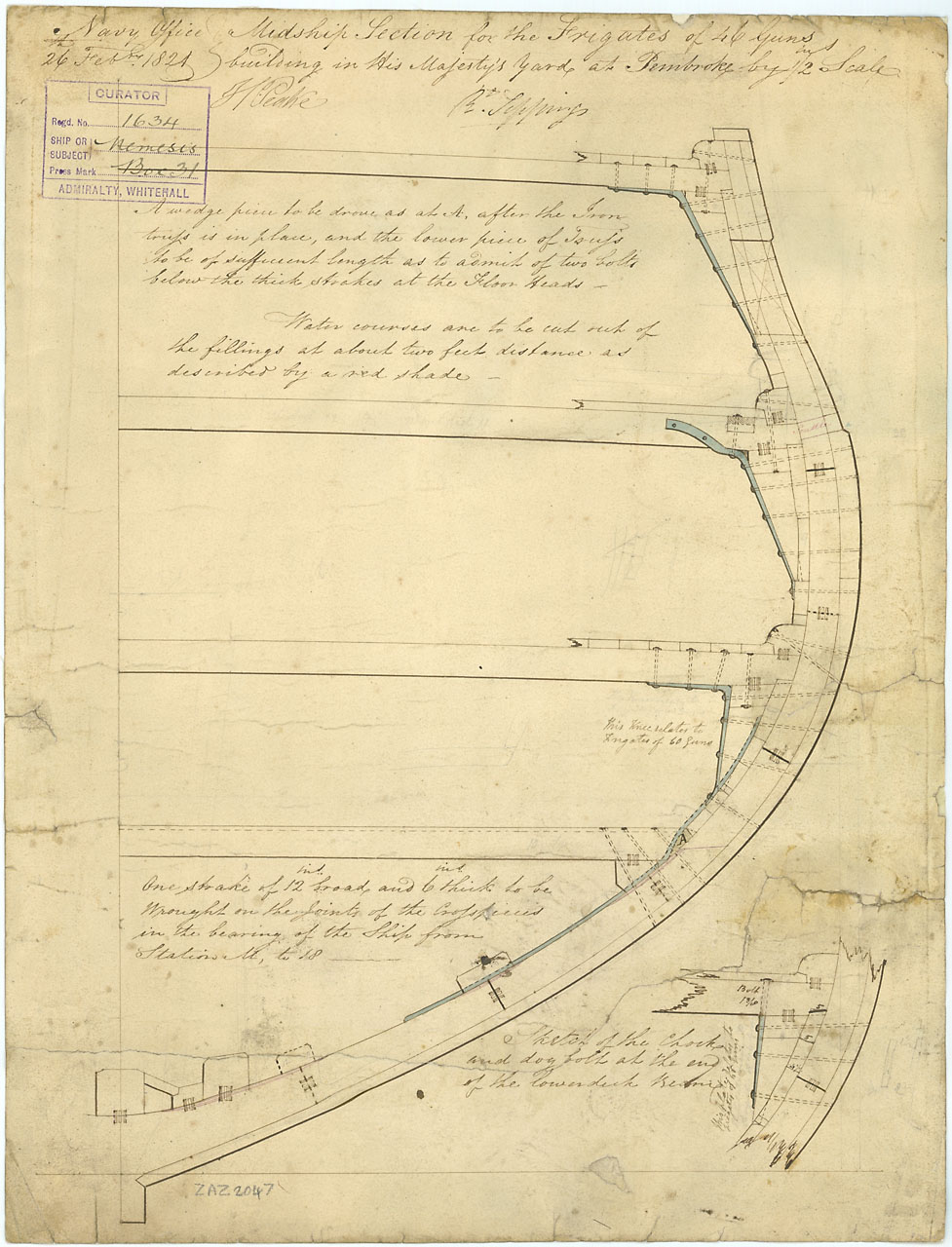
Midship section of the Nemesis

== Description ==
The Druid sub-class was an enlarged and improved version of the Serinapatam design, modified with a circular stern. Nemesis had a length at the gundeck of 159 feet 1 inch (48.5 m) and 133 feet 2 inches (40.6 m) at the keel. She had a beam of 41 feet 1 inch (12.5 m), a draught of 15 feet 1 inch (4.6 m) and a depth of hold of 12 feet 9 inches (3.9 m). The ship's tonnage was 1167 42/94 tons burthen. The Druid sub-class was armed with twenty-eight 18-pounder cannon on her gundeck, fourteen 32-pounder carronades on her quarterdeck and a pair of 9-pounder cannon and two more 32-pounder carronades in the forecastle. The ships had a crew of 315 officers and ratings.

== Construction and career ==
Nemesis, the second ship of her name to serve in the Royal Navy, was ordered on 23 July 1817, laid down in August 1823 at Pembroke Dockyard, Wales, and launched on 19 August 1826. She was completed for ordinary at Plymouth Dockyard in September 1826 and the ship was roofed over from the mainmast forward. The ship was never commissioned and was broken up by 4 July 1866.
