= Sophia (1826 ship) =

Whaling ship

History

United Kingdom
- Name: Sophia
- Builder: Louis Labbé, Quebec
- Launched: 1826
- Fate: Burnt 16 March 1833

General characteristics
- Tons burthen: 419, or 420, or 429 (bm)
- Length: 119 ft (36.3 m)
- Beam: 29 ft (8.8 m)

Sophia was launched at Quebec in 1826 and sailed to London. In 1830 she became a whaler in the British southern whale fishery. A fire destroyed her in the Seychelles in March 1833.

== Career ==
She was re-registered in London on 16 March 1827. Sophia first appeared in the Register of Shipping (RS) in 1827. She initially sailed as a West Indiaman and to the Gulf of Mexico.

Year	Master	Owner	Trade	Source & notes
1827	Sabiston	Baker	London–Jamaica	RS
1831	Sabiston; Haycock	Baker	London–Vera Cruz; London–South Seas	RS
1833	Haycock	Baker	London–Southern Fishery	RS
1833	Acock	Baker & Co.	London	Lloyd's Register; small repairs 1830

== Whaling voyage and loss ==
Sophia sailed from London on 18 December 1830, bound for the Seychelles.

In late 1832 Sophia, Acock, master, was at 39°S 49°E where she found and killed two whales. Her first and second mates went in pursuit of some whales in two boats, but never returned to Sophia. Captain Acock cruised the vicinity for four days, but without being able to find the missing two officers and 10 men. He then called in at Table Bay on 28 December to recruit a replacement crew.

On 16 March 1833 a fire destroyed Sophia off the Seychelles. Her crew were rescued. The loss occurred at 5°S 54°E. She had about 1000 barrels of whale oil on board at the time of her loss. The crew arrived at Trois Freres. French sources state that the whaler Sophia, Hencoc, master, burned about 28 leagues from Silhouette Island. The crew saved themselves by taking to her boats and landing there.
