= Seringapatam-class frigate =

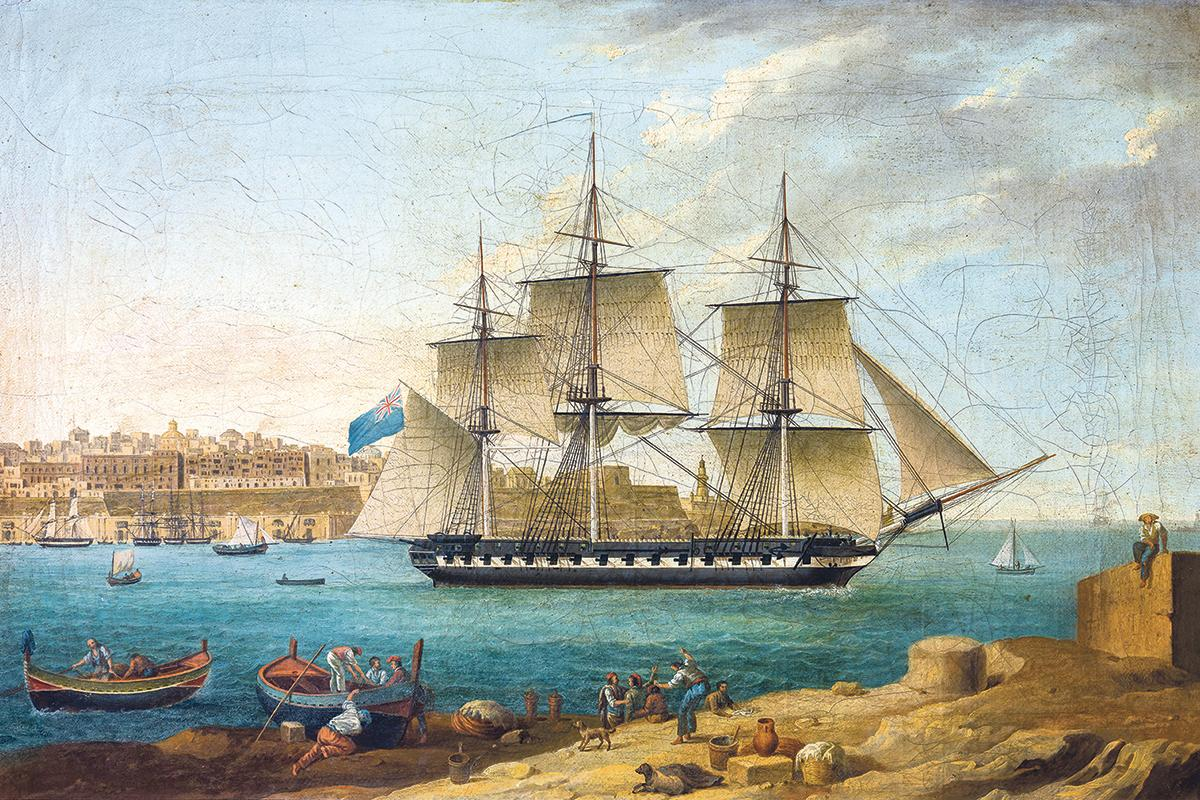
- HMS Seringapatam at anchor in Valletta Harbour between 1824 and 1827

Class overview
- Name: Seringapatam
- Operators: Royal Navy
- Subclasses: Druid; Andromeda
- Completed: 7 (plus 2 completed as steam/screw frigates)
- Canceled: 17 (several after launching)

General characteristics
- Type: Fifth-rate frigate
- Tons burthen: 1148, or 1152 (bm)
- Length: 157 ft 6 in (48.0 m) (gundeck); 132 ft 1 1/2 in (40.3 m) (keel)
- Beam: 40 ft 5 in (12.3 m)
- Depth of hold: 13 ft 6 in (4.1 m)
- Propulsion: Sail
- Sail plan: Full-rigged ship
- Complement: 315
- Armament: Upper deck: 28 × 18-pounder guns; Fc: 2 × 9-pounder guns + 2 × 32-pounder carronades; QD: 14 × 32-pounder carronades

The Seringapatam-class frigates, were a class of British Royal Navy 46-gun sailing frigates.

== Design ==
The first vessel of the Seringapatam class was HMS Seringapatam. Seringapatam's design was based on the French frigate Président, which the British had captured in 1806. Seringapatam was originally ordered as a 38-gun frigate, but the re-classification of British warships which took effect in February 1817 raised this rating to 46-gun.

== Class and subclasses ==
The Admiralty ordered six further ships to this design – including three ships which had originally been ordered as Leda-class frigates, but the Seringapatam design was subsequently altered to produce a Modified version which was labelled the Druid sub-class, and three of the ships formerly ordered to the Seringapatam original design (Madagascar, Nemesis and Jason) were re-ordered to this modified design. Subsequently, a further modification of the design was produced, which was labelled the Andromeda sub-class, and the remaining three of the ships formerly ordered to the Seringapatam original design (Manilla, Tigris and Statira) were re-ordered to this modified design. Further vessels were ordered to both modified designs, but the majority of these were subsequently cancelled. Both modified types are listed below.

== Ships in the class ==
- HMS Seringapatam
  - Builder: British East India Company, Bombay Dockyard.
  - Ordered: 21 August 1813
  - Laid down: November 1817
  - Launched: 5 September 1819
  - Completed: 10 April 1821 at Plymouth Dockyard.
  - Fate: Receiving ship at Cape of Good Hope in July 1847; coal hulk 1852, broken up between 1873 and 1883.

== Druid sub-class (1st modified version of Seringapatam Class) ==
- HMS Druid
  - Builder: Pembroke Dockyard.
  - Ordered: 23 July 1817
  - Laid down: August 1821
  - Launched: 1 July 1825
  - Completed: 21 December 1825 at Plymouth Dockyard.
  - Fate: Sold to be broken up in April 1863.
- HMS Nemesis- had first been ordered to Modified Leda class, later to original Seringapatam design
  - Builder: Pembroke Dockyard.
  - Ordered: 23 July 1817
  - Laid down: August 1823
  - Launched: 19 August 1826
  - Completed: never completed; laid up at Plymouth Dockyard.
  - Fate: Broken up in July 1866.
- HMS Madagascar – had first been ordered to original Seringapatam design
  - Builder: East India Company, Bombay Dockyard.
  - Ordered: 5 April 1819
  - Laid down: October 1821
  - Launched: 15 November 1822; 1164 tons (bm)
  - Completed: January 1829 at Portsmouth Dockyard.
  - Fate: Sold to be broken up at Rio de Janeiro 5 May 1863.
- HMS Leda
  - Builder: Pembroke Dockyard.
  - Ordered: 15 May 1821
  - Laid down: October 1824
  - Launched: 15 April 1828
  - Completed: never completed; laid up at Plymouth Dockyard.
  - Fate: Sold to be broken up on 15 May 1906.
- HMS Hotspur
  - Builder: Pembroke Dockyard.
  - Ordered: 15 May 1821
  - Laid down: July 1825
  - Launched: 9 October 1828
  - Completed: never completed; laid up at Plymouth Dockyard.
  - Fate: Renamed Monmouth 1868. Sold to be broken up in 1902.
- HMS Africaine
  - Builder: Chatham Dockyard.
  - Ordered: 8 January 1822
  - Laid down: September 1825
  - Launched: 20 December 1827
  - Completed: 3 March 1828.
  - Fate: Sold to Trinity House in May 1867.
- HMS Eurotas
  - Builder: Chatham Dockyard.
  - Ordered: 13 September 1824
  - Laid down: February 1827
  - Launched: 19 February 1829
  - Completed: 20 March 1828.
  - Fate: Sold to be broken up in November 1865.
- A further vessel, HMS Jason, also first ordered to Modified Leda Class, then to the original Seringapatam design, was again re-ordered subsequently, now to the Andromeda design, but was never finally built.

== Andromeda sub-Class (2nd modified version of Seringapatam Class) ==
- HMS Andromeda
  - Builder: East India Company, Bombay Dockyard.
  - Ordered: 5 April 1827
  - Laid down: August 1827
  - Launched: 6 January? 1829; 1166 tons (bm)
  - Completed: not completed – laid up at Plymouth Dockyard.
  - Fate: Provision hulk November 1846. Sold to be broken up on 24 December 1863.
- HMS Seahorse
  - Builder: Pembroke Dockyard.
  - Ordered: 9 January 1823
  - Laid down: November 1826
  - Launched: 22 July 1830
  - Completed: never completed as sailing frigate; laid up at Plymouth Dockyard.
  - Fate: Converted to a steam/screw-driven frigate 1845–47. Screw mortar frigate 1856. Coal hulk 1870, renamed Lavinia. Sold to be broken up 1902.
- HMS Stag
  - Builder: Pembroke Dockyard.
  - Ordered: 9 January 1823
  - Laid down: April 1828
  - Launched: 2 October 1830
  - Completed: 9 July 1831 at Portsmouth Dockyard.
  - Fate: Broken up in August 1866.
- HMS Maeander
  - Builder: Chatham Dockyard.
  - Ordered: 13 September 1824
  - Laid down: February 1829
  - Launched: 5 May 1840
  - Completed: 17 January 1848.
  - Fate: Hulked 1857. Wrecked at Ascension in July 1870.
- HMS Forth
  - Builder: Pembroke Dockyard.
  - Ordered: 9 June 1825
  - Laid down: November 1828
  - Launched: 1 August 1833
  - Completed: never completed as a sailing frigate; laid up at Plymouth Dockyard.
  - Fate: Converted to a steam/screw-driven frigate 1845–47. Screw mortar frigate 1856. Coal hulk 1869, renamed Jupiter. Sold to be broken up 1883.

The remaining ships ordered or re-ordered to this design were never completed:

- HMS Jason – ordered 23 July 1817 from Woolwich Dockyard, firstly to Modified Leda Class design, later altered to original Seringapatam design in October 1820, to Druid design in 1822, and finally to Andromeda design in 1826; cancelled 7 February 1831.
- HMS Statira – ordered 23 July 1817 from Plymouth Dockyard, originally to Modified Leda Class, later altered to original Seringapatam design in October 1820, to Druid design in 1822, and finally to Andromeda design in 1826; cancelled 31 August 1832.
- HMS Manilla – ordered 5 April 1819 from East India Company's Bombay Dockyard, firstly ordered to original Seringapatam design, later altered to Andromeda design in 1826; cancelled 7 February 1831.
- HMS Euphrates – ordered 22 October 1820 from Portsmouth Dockyard, cancelled 7 February 1831.
- HMS Pique – ordered 25 October 1820 from Plymouth Dockyard, cancelled 16 June 1832.
- HMS Tigris – ordered 25 October 1820 from Plymouth Dockyard (utilising teak frames from Bombay Dockyard), firstly to original Seringapatam design, later altered to Andromeda design in 1826; cancelled 31 August 1832.
- HMS Spartan – ordered 13 September 1824 from Portsmouth Dockyard, cancelled 7 February 1831.
- HMS Theban – ordered 13 September 1824 from Portsmouth Dockyard, cancelled 7 February 1831.
- HMS Inconstant – ordered 9 June 1825 from Sheerness Dockyard, cancelled 9 March 1832.
- HMS Orpheus – ordered 9 June 1825 from Chatham Dockyard, cancelled 7 February 1831.
- HMS Severn – ordered 9 June 1825 from Plymouth Dockyard, cancelled 7 February 1831.
- HMS Tiber – ordered 9 June 1825 from Portsmouth Dockyard, cancelled 7 February 1831.

== Bibliography ==
- Colledge, J. J.; Warlow, Ben (2006) [1969]. Ships of the Royal Navy: The Complete Record of All Fighting Ships of the Royal Navy from the 15th Century to the Present (3rd Rev ed.). London: Chatham Publishing. ISBN 978-1-86176-281-8. OCLC 67375475.
- David Lyon and Rif Winfield (2004), The Sail and Steam Navy List 1815–1889. Chatham Publishing, London. ISBN 1-86176-032-9.
- Phipps, John, (of the Master Attendant's Office, Calcutta), (1840) A Collection of Papers Relative to Ship Building in India ...: Also a Register Comprehending All the Ships ... Built in India to the Present Time .... (Scott).
