= Gunjava (1826 ship) =

History

United Kingdom
- Name: Gunjava
- Builder: J.Mackenzie, Sulkea
- Launched: 23 January 1826
- Fate: Wrecked 5 December 1827

General characteristics
- Tons burthen: 389 (bm)

Gunjava was launched at Sulkea in 1826. She was wrecked in December 1827.

On 10 August 1826, Gunjava, C. Oakley, master, sailed from Table Bay, bound for Mauritius. She was carrying a cargo of wheat, sugar, rice, and coffee, and horses.

On 5 December at Madras a hurricane drove Gunjava, J.Taylor, master, out to sea, where she foundered. Several other British ships were lost at the same time. The masters, including Taylor, were all ashore.
