= Sincapore (1826 ship) =

History

United Kingdom
- Name: Sincapore
- Namesake: Singapore
- Builder: St. Martin's, New Brunswick
- Launched: 5 December 1826
- Fate: Wrecked 1 September 1830

General characteristics
- Tons burthen: 271, or 27170/94 (bm)
- Length: 94 ft 9 in (28.9 m)
- Beam: 25 ft 5 in (7.7 m)

Sincapore (or Singapore) was launched in 1826, at St Martin's, New Brunswick. Her registry was transferred to London.

She entered Lloyd's Register (LR).

Year	Master	Owner	Trade	Source
1827	M.Tait	W. Andrew	Cork	LR

She then proceeded to sail between England and Canada. In 1813, the British East India Company (EIC) had lost its monopoly on the trade between India and Britain. British ships were then free to sail to India or the Indian Ocean under a licence from the EIC.

Year	Master	Owner	Trade	Source
1831	M.Tait	W. Andrew	London–Cape of Good Hope	LR

She was on a voyage from Mauritius to Glasgow when she was driven ashore in Table Bay on 1 September 1830, and was wrecked.
