= List of bomb vessels of the Royal Navy =

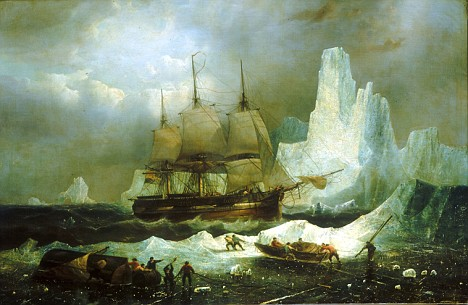
HMS Erebus, a bomb vessel of the Royal Navy, depicted on a voyage of exploration in the Arctic.

Bomb vessels served in the Royal Navy over a period of about 150 years. The concept entered the Navy in the 1680s, based on French designs and usage, and remained in service until the mid-19th century. Bomb vessels were designed to bombard enemy positions on land, such as towns and fortresses. For this they were fitted with one or two mortars that could fire high-trajectory shells over considerable distances. They were fleet support units, and as such were not intended to engage enemy ships directly except in self-defence, and so received only light conventional armament. They could also carry explosive shells in addition to regular shot, and were the only ships in the navy so equipped. The first designs tended to be ketch-rigged, to allow the mortars to fire forward. Though effective, this arrangement made for poor sailing qualities and by 1790 the ship rig had replaced the ketch.

While the Navy introduced several purpose-built classes and single ship designs, it augmented this during wartime by buying and converting merchant vessels, or converting some of its own warships. Bomb vessels tended to have a consistent naming policy, being names of volcanoes, or those in some way linked with the concept of hell and fire. Examples included Blast, Furnace, Explosion, Fury, Aetna and Vesuvius. The names were re-used several times for different bomb vessels over the decades. Bomb vessels played a significant role in several of the battles fought by the Royal Navy, being deployed to threaten the Danish capital at the Battle of Copenhagen in 1801, actually firing on the city in 1807, playing a distinctive role in the 1814 Battle of Baltimore, and firing on enemy positions during the Bombardment of Algiers in 1816. Bomb vessels went on to serve in other fields as well. Their sturdy design to resist the recoil of their mortars made them desirable ships for polar exploration, as their hulls could resist the pressure of the ice for longer. Racehorse, Furnace, Carcass, Fury, Hecla, Erebus and Terror, among others, all went on to serve as exploration vessels.

Eventually, the Royal Navy began to phase out the concept. The last bomb-ship to serve with the Royal Navy was Sulphur, which had been converted to a survey ship in 1835 and then a receiving ship in 1843 before finally being broken up in 1857. The concept was revisited in a modified form during the Crimean War but on a considerably smaller scale.

== 1687–1729 ==
Bomb vessels were first used by the Royal Navy during the Nine Years War, when French coastal towns such as Dunkirk and St Malo were bombarded by English fleets. The design of the bomb vessels improved considerably during this period. The first generations used fixed mortars, which were aimed by rotating the whole ship. By the end of the war larger mortars were being used and they were placed on traversable mountings.

=== Early designs ===
The concept of Royal Navy bomb vessels was first proposed by naval draughtsman Edward Dummer, who observed their French counterparts in action in the 1684 Bombardment of Genoa. Dummer was unable to go aboard any of the French bomb vessels, but took detailed sketches of their design and operation and was later granted an audience to present these to King Charles II of England later that year. Royal approval was granted in 1687 for two Royal Navy bomb vessels, to be built in accordance with Dummer's drawings and named Salamander and Firedrake.

Construction was completed over 1687 and 1688, with Salamander built at Deptford Dockyard and Firedrake at Woolwich. Both vessels were broadly similar to ketches but with two 12 1/2 inch mortars installed in fixed positions before the main mast. Firedrake was by far the larger of the two, measuring 279 tons burthen with a gundeck length of 84 ft 9 in (25.83 m) and a keel of 68 ft 0 in (20.73 m). Her initial complement was 50 men.

=== Purpose-built ===
- Salamander (1687)
- Firedrake (1688)
- Firedrake class (1693)
  - Firedrake (1693)
  - Granado (1693)
  - Serpent (1693)
  - Mortar (1693)
- Serpent class (1695)
  - Serpent (1695)
  - Thunder (1695)
  - Furnace (1695)
  - Granado (1695)
  - Carcass (1695)
  - Comet (1695)
  - Dreadful (1695)
  - Basilisk (1695)
  - Blast (1695)
  - Terror (1696)

=== Purchased vessels ===
To fill the gap in operational capability while the 1695 Serpent class vessels were under construction, a number of merchant ships were purchased and converted. Most of these vessels were re-sold after the 1695 Serpent class came into service.

- Phoenix (1692)
- Endeavour (1694)
- Angel (1694)
- Owners Advent (General's Adventure) (1694)
- Greyhound (1694)
- Star (1694)
- Society (1694)
- Mary Ann (1694)
- Truelove (1694)

=== Prizes ===
Captured from Spain:

- Thunder (1718)

=== Converted vessels ===
Converted from naval yachts of the same name:

- Portsmouth (1688)
- Kitchen (1692)

== 1730–1783 ==
=== Purpose-built ===
- Salamander class (1730)
  - Salamander (1730)
  - Terrible (1730)
- Alderney (1735)
- Basilisk class (1740)
  - Blast (1740)
  - Basilisk (1740)
  - Thunder (1740)
  - Carcass (1740)
  - Lightning (1740)
  - Furnace (1740)
- Comet class (1742)
  - Firedrake (1742)
  - Mortar (1742)
  - Comet (1742)
  - Terror (1742)
  - Serpent (1742)
- Granado (1742)
- Infernal class (1757)
  - Infernal (1757)
  - Carcass (1759)
  - Terror (1759)
  - Basilisk (1759)
  - Blast (1759)
  - Mortar (1759)
  - Thunder (1759)
- Aetna class (1776)
  - Aetna (1776)
  - Vesuvius (1776)
  - Thunder (1779)
  - Terror (1779)

=== Converted sloops ===
The existing fleet of bomb vessels was augmented in wartime with the temporary conversion of ship sloops. Five were taken up for conversion in the Seven Years' War, with one of them, the Racehorse, being re-converted once more to serve as a bomb vessel in the American War of Independence under the name Thunder.

==== Seven Years' War ====
- Racehorse (reclassified as bomb between 1758 and 1773)
- Pelican (reclassified as bomb between 1758 and 1760, and again between 1762 and 1763)
- Baltimore (reclassified as bomb between 1758 and 1760, and again in 1762)
- Falcon (reclassified as bomb between 1758 and 1759)
- Kingfisher (reclassified as bomb between 1758 and 1760)

==== American War of Independence ====
- Thunder (reclassified as bomb between 1775 and 1778)

== 1784–1840 ==
There were no new bomb vessels built or purchased between the end of the American War of Independence and the outbreak of the French Revolutionary Wars. As with earlier wars, numbers of existing Royal Navy warships were converted into bomb vessels to serve during the French Revolutionary and Napoleonic Wars, and the War of 1812. These supplemented the existing fleet, which by 1793 consisted of only the Aetna-class vessels Vesuvius and Terror. Purchased and converted merchant vessels, and converted navy warships provided most of the bomb vessels that saw service in these wars, though limited construction on purpose-built vessels began in the early 19th century, and by 1812 work had begun on a larger class of vessels.

=== Purpose-built ===
- Convulsion class (1804)
  - Convulsion (1804)
  - Destruction (1804)
- Project (1806)
- Vesuvius class (1813)
  - Vesuvius (1813)
  - Terror (1813)
  - Beelzebub (1813)
  - Fury (cancelled in 1813)
- Hecla class (1814)
  - Fury (1814)
  - Hecla (1815)
  - Infernal (1815)
  - Meteor (1823)
  - Aetna (1824)
  - Sulphur (1826)
  - Erebus (1826)
  - Thunder (1829)
  - Vesuvius (cancelled in 1831)
  - Devastation (cancelled in 1831)
  - Volcano (cancelled in 1833)
  - Belzebub (cancelled in 1833)

=== Purchased vessels ===
- Vulcan (1797)
- Volcano (1797)
- Explosion (1797)
- Hecla (1797)
- Strombolo (1797)
- Sulphur (1797)
- Tartarus (1797)
- Aetna (1803)
- Acheron (1803)
- Meteor (1803)
- Thunder (1803)
- Prospero (1803)
- Lucifer (1803)
- Devastation (1803)

=== Ex-Dutch prize ===
- Thunder (1797)

=== Converted vessels ===
Ship sloops continued to be the most common type of vessel converted, though Discovery had been a ship built for exploration, while Perseus and Proselyte were former sixth rate frigates.

==== 1798 ====
- Discovery (reclassified as bomb between 1798 and 1808)
- Bulldog (reclassified as bomb between 1798 and 1801)
- Fury (reclassified as bomb between 1798 and 1811)
- Perseus (reclassified as bomb between 1798 and 1805)
- Zebra (reclassified as bomb between 1798 and 1812)

==== 1807–1812 ====
- Hound (reclassified as bomb between 1807 and 1812)
- Proselyte (reclassified as bomb in 1808)
- Meteor (reclassified as bomb between 1812 and 1816)
- Strombolo (reclassified as bomb between 1811 and 1815)
- Volcano (reclassified as bomb between 1811 and 1816)

== Mortar frigates, vessels and floats (1850s) ==
The outbreak of the Crimean War in 1854 led to a revival of the concept of the bomb vessel, but on a much smaller scale. Two types were eventually developed, the mortar vessels, divided into 60-, 65-, 70- and 75-foot types, and the mortar floats. The mortar vessels carried a basic rig on a signal mast, and were armed with a single 13in mortar. The mortar floats were generally smaller, un-powered craft. In addition to these vessels, several old sailing frigates that had recently been converted to screw propulsion were earmarked for fitting with mortars. Only one entered service however.

=== Mortar frigates ===
Four obsolete sailing frigates, previously converted to screw propulsion, were ordered fitted with mortars in 1855. Only one, Horatio, was completed, while work on the others was cancelled.

- Horatio (1855)
- Eurotas (cancelled)
- Seahorse (cancelled)
- Forth (cancelled)

=== Mortar vessels ===
The first two vessels of this type were old dockyard lighters built in the 1830s. They were converted in late 1854 and were followed with the construction of two batches of 10 vessels each, and a third of 34. The original two, and the following 20 all received names, but these were replaced by numbers in late 1855, and were listed as MV1 to MV22. The last 34 were never named, and instead were listed as MV23 to MV50. They were gradually withdrawn following the end of the Crimean War, often either becoming dockyard craft or lighters, or being sold for breaking up.

==== Converted dockyard lighters ====
- Drake (1854)
- Sinbad (1854)

==== Purpose-built vessels ====
- Flamer (1855)
- Firm (1855)
- Havock (1855)
- Hardy (1855)
- Growler (1855)
- Surly (1855)
- Blazer (1855)
- Mastiff (1855)
- Manly (1855)
- Porpoise (1855)
- Raven (1855)
- Rocket (1855)
- Redbreast (1855)
- Prompt (1855)
- Pickle (1855)
- Magnet (1855)
- Camel (1855)
- Beacon (1855)
- Carron (1855)
- Grappler (1855)
- MV23 (1856)
- MV24 (1856)
- MV25 (1856)
- MV26 (1856)
- MV27 (1856)
- MV28 (1856)
- MV29 (1856)
- MV30 (1856)
- MV31 (1856)
- MV32 (1856)
- MV33 (1856)
- MV34 (1856)
- MV35 (1856)
- MV36 (1856)
- MV37 (1856)
- MV38 (1856)
- MV39 (1856)
- MV40 (1856)
- MV41 (1856)
- MV42 (1856)
- MV43 (1856)
- MV44 (1856)
- MV45 (1856)
- MV46 (1856)
- MV47 (1856)
- MV48 (1856)
- MV49 (1856)
- MV50 (1856)
- MV51 (1856)
- MV52 (1856)
- MV53 (1856)
- MV54 (1856)
- MV55 (1856)
- MV56 (1856)

=== Mortar floats ===
50 mortar floats were built for service during the Crimean War. They had no sails and had to be towed into position. Three were launched in 1855, the remaining 47 in 1856. They did not receive names (with the exception of MF103, which was named Cupid) and instead were numbered from MF101 to MF150. Most became dockyard craft, lighters and pontoons in the mid-1860s.
