= List of ship launches in 1834 =

The list of ship launches in 1834 includes a chronological list of some ships launched in 1834.

Date	Ship	Class	Builder	Location	Country	Notes
9 January	Camilla	Schooner	Menzies & Son	Leith	United Kingdom	For Old Shipping Company.
11 January	Psyche	Barque	Perkins	Newport	United Kingdom	For Messrs. Drews.
14 January	James Brown	Barque	Steele	Greenock	United Kingdom	For private owner.
17 January	Margaret Graham	Barque	John Scott & Sons	Greenock	United Kingdom	For private owner.
25 January	Agnes	Barque	Thomas Royden & Co.	Liverpool	United Kingdom	For John Wright Jr.
30 January	Kirkman Finlay	Merchantman	John Scott & Sons	Greenock	United Kingdom	For private owner.
30 January	Peri	Schooner	John Ball Jr.	Salcombe	United Kingdom	For Richard Lindon and others.
January	Black Nymph	Barque	W. Wilkinson	Sunderland	United Kingdom	For private owner.
January	Swallow	Merchantman	Kirkbride & Co	Sunderland	United Kingdom	For Mr. Thompson.
24 February	Calypso	Full-rigged ship	G. H. Anderson	Leith	United Kingdom	For private owner.
24 February	William Metcalf	Full-rigged ship	James Leithead	Sunderland	United Kingdom	For H. Metcalf.
25 February	Dauntless	Chinaman	Smith	Gainsborough	United Kingdom	For private owner.
25 February	Newcastle	Steamship	Seddon & Laidlaw	Liverpool	United Kingdom	For private owner.
26 February	Albatross	Steamship	Edward Gibson	Hull	United Kingdom	For private owner.
27 February	Alarm	Schooner	Taylor	Woodbridge	United Kingdom	For private owner.
27 February	Sinbad	Lighter		Pembroke Dockyard	United Kingdom	For Royal Navy.
27 February	Unnamed	Steamship	Fernie & Ord	Limehouse	United Kingdom	For Royal Neapolitan Navy.
February	George Lockwood	Merchantman	James Johnson	Sunderland	United Kingdom	For G. Eastill.
4 March	Lady Lansdowne	Steamship		Killaloe	United Kingdom	For private owner.
11 March	Commodore	Schooner	John Young	Newport	United Kingdom	For Mesrs. Pope & Co.
11 March	Countess Wilton	Schooner	James Howard	Mistley	United Kingdom	For private owner.
13 March	City of Hamburgh	Paddle steamer	McGhie & Hawkes	Rotherhithe	United Kingdom	For General Steam Navigation Company.
20 March	Frolick	Merchantman		Newcastle upon Tyne	United Kingdom	For private owner.
25 March	Buzzard	Cherokee-class brig-sloop		Portsmouth Dockyard	United Kingdom	For Royal Navy.
25 March	Drake	Lighter		Portsmouth Dockyard	United Kingdom	For Royal Navy.
26 March	Belle Poule	Surveillante-class frigate	Anne Françoise Joseph Besuchet	Cherbourg	France	For French Navy.
26 March	Spitfire	Firefly-class gunvessel		Woolwich Dockyard	United Kingdom	For Royal Navy.
27 March	Canton	Schooner	Dikes & Gibson	Hull	United Kingdom	For private owner.
27 March	Mahi	Schooner		Bombay Dockyard	India	For British East India Company.
March	Messenger	Merchantman	T. Rowntree	Sunderland	United Kingdom	For R. Danson.
March	Vigilant	Merchantman	George Frater & Co	Sunderland	United Kingdom	For Hunter & Co.
2 April	Hindoo	Barque	Henry Barrick	Whitby	United Kingdom	For private owner.
10 April	Alexander Baring	East Indiaman	Wigram & Green	Blackwall	United Kingdom	For Baring & Co.
10 April	Fame	Steamship	Messrs. Wallace	Blackwall	United Kingdom	For Old Margate and Gravesend Steam Packet Company.
10 April	Star	Steamship	Curling & Young	Limehouse	United Kingdom	For New Gravesend Steam Packet Company.
23 April	Pomona	Schooner	William Roberts	Milford Haven	United Kingdom	For private owner.
24 April	Malabar	East Indiaman	Wigram & Green	Blackwall	United Kingdom	For Baring Bros.
April	Alderman	Brig	Kirkbride & Partners	Sunderland	United Kingdom	For private owner.
April	Emerald	Steamship			United Kingdom	For Gravesend and Milton Steam Packet Company.
April	The George	Steamship	Mulvey	Chester	United Kingdom	For private owner.
April	Thomas & Margaret	Merchantman	J. Storey	Sunderland	United Kingdom	For private owner.
3 May	Charlotte	Yacht		Southampton	United Kingdom	For Mr. Powell.
3 May	Queen of the Isle	Paddle steamer	Robert Napier & Co.	Glasgow	United Kingdom	For Isle of Man Steam Packet Company.
13 May	Royal Adelaide	Royal yacht	John Fincham	Virginia Water	United Kingdom	For William IV.
15 May	Emma	Merchantman	Christopher	Southwold	United Kingdom	For private owner.
23 May	The Enterprise	Paddle steamer		Preston	United Kingdom	For Preston, Lytham, and Southport Steam Navigation Company.
24 May	Euphrates	Chinaman	Wilson & Sons	Liverpool	United Kingdom	For Messrs. McCracken, Jamieson & Co.
24 May	Favourite	East Indiaman	Humphrey & Co.	Hull	United Kingdom	For Messrs. Humphrey & Co.
24 May	John McAdam	Full-rigged ship	James Gordon	Liverpool	United Kingdom	For Duncan Gibb.
24 May	Liverpool	Pilot boat	William Dickinson & Co.	Liverpool	United Kingdom	For private owner.
26 May	Antilles	Barque	Adamson	Grangemouth	United Kingdom	For Messrs. McCunn.
May	Blazer	Tartarus-class gunvessel		Chatham Dockyard	United Kingdom	For Royal Navy.
May	Eucles	Barque	William Gales	Sunderland	United Kingdom	For William Gales.
7 June	Nile	Frigate	Fetcher & Fearnall	Limehouse	United Kingdom	For Egyptian Navy.
13 June	Floreville	Brig		Peterhead	United Kingdom	For private owner.
6 June	Active	Brig		Peterhead	United Kingdom	For private owner.
21 June	The Ann	Steamship		Woodside	United Kingdom	For private owner.
23 June	Amphritrite	Full-rigged ship	W. Cornforth	Deptford	United Kingdom	For private owner.
23 June	Quicksilver	Schooner	William Brook	Bideford	United Kingdom	For private owner.
23 June	Tartarus	Tartarus-class gunvessel		Pembroke Dockyard	United Kingdom	For Royal Navy.
24 June	Mischief	Brigantine		Fishbourne	United Kingdom	For James Lyon.
8 July	Duchess of Northumberland	Full-rigged ship	Philip Laing	Sunderland	United Kingdom	For Parking & Co.
8 July	Otterspool	Full-rigged ship	Mottershead, Heyes & Son	Liverpool	United Kingdom	For Messrs. Taylor, Potter & Co.
9 July	8th of July	Corvette		Lisbon	Portugal	For Portuguese Navy.
21 July	Mary Ann	Barque	Ogden & Simey	Sunderland	United Kingdom	For G. Sparks.
21 July	Pique	Fifth rate		Devonport Dockyard	United Kingdom	For Royal Navy.
21 July	Saint George	Barque	J. Carr	Sunderland	United Kingdom	For Crawford & Co.
22 July	Boadicia	Barque	J. Leithead	Sunderland	United Kingdom	For Faucus & Co.
24 July	Senator	Barque	Adamson & Co.	Sunderland	United Kingdom	For Mr. Adamson.
29 July	Earl Grey	Brig	Brocklebank	Whitehaven	United Kingdom	For private owner.
29 July	Eliza Heywood	Merchantman	K. Wood & Sons	Maryport	United Kingdom	For private owner.
July	Ant	Lighter		location	United Kingdom	For Royal Navy.
July	Carleton	Barque		Richibucto	(United Kingdom of Great Britain and Ireland) Colony of New Brunswick	For private owner.
July	Governor	Barque	J. Storey	Sunderland	United Kingdom	For Storey & Co.
July	Nautilus	Snow	Austin	Sunderland	United Kingdom	For G. Prest.
July	Socrates	Snow	John Gales	Sunderland	United Kingdom	For J. Gales.
4 August	George Marsden	Barque	George Frater & Co.	Sunderland	United Kingdom	For H. Panton
5 August	Aggripina	East Indiaman	Tindall	Scarborough	United Kingdom	For Messrs. Tindall & Brown.
6 August	Syria	Barque	Leithead	Sunderland	United Kingdom	For Woods & Co.
7 August	Jane White	Merchantman	James Johnson	Sunderland	United Kingdom	For Mr Thompson.
6 August	Curlew	Snow	William Potts	Sunderland	United Kingdom	For William Potts.
11 August	The Irishman	Steamship			United Kingdom	For private owner.
16 August	Shakespeare	Paddle steamer		Dover	United Kingdom	For private owner.
20 August	John Dugdale	Full-rigged ship		Whitehaven	United Kingdom	For Little, Dugdale & Crossley.
August	Elizabeth Holderness	Barque			(United Kingdom of Great Britain and Ireland) Colony of Nova Scotia	For private owner.
August	Samuel Enderby	Full-rigged ship	White	Cowes	United Kingdom	For Samuel Enderby.
August	Thetis	Brig			(United Kingdom of Great Britain and Ireland) Nova Scotia	For private owner.
5 September	Canton	Full-rigged ship	William Gales	Sunderland	United Kingdom	For Pirie & Co.
6 September	Garryowen	City of Dublin Steam Packet Company	Laird & Son	North Birkenhead	United Kingdom	For .
6 September	Lion	Steamship	Edward Gibson	Kingston upon Hull	United Kingdom	For private owner.
6 September	Little Penn	Schooner	Humble & Milcrest	Liverpool	United Kingdom	For Sir John Tobin.
6 September	William Henry Angus	Snow	Joshua Helmsley	Sunderland	United Kingdom	For Angus & Co.
6 September	Young Gipsy	Schooner	Humble & Milcrest	Liverpool	United Kingdom	For Sir John Tobin.
9 September	Paragon	Merchantman	Rowntree	Sunderland	United Kingdom	For Mr. Hodgson.
10 September	Robert & Anne	Snow	S. & P. Mills	Sunderland	United Kingdom	For R. Robson.
19 September	Martinique	Ariane-class corvette		Saint-Malo	France	For French Navy.
20 September	Sabine	Ariane-class corvette		Saint-Malo	France	For French Navy.
23 September	Vulcan	Steamship	S. Gutteridge	Selby	United Kingdom	For private owner.
25 September	Osprey	Steamship	Bristol Steam Packet Company	Hotwells	United Kingdom	For private owner.
September	Tamerlane	Merchantman		Ayr	United Kingdom	For J. & W. Stewart.
September	Fidelity	Brig		Halifax	(United Kingdom of Great Britain and Ireland) Colony of Nova Scotia	For private owner.
September	Vivid	Brig			United Kingdom	For private owner.
3 October	The Wallace	Merchantman	Duncanson	Alloa	United Kingdom	For private owner.
4 October	England	Packet ship	Smith, Demon & Cornstock	New York	United States	For Wood and Trimble and Samuel Hicks & Sons.
4 October	Mermaid	Steamship	Robert Russel & Co.	North Birkenhead	United Kingdom	For private owner.
6 October	Rapid	Barque	Duthie	Aberdeen	United Kingdom	For private owner.
7 October	Harmony	Brig	Alexander Hall & CO	Aberdeen	United Kingdom	For Messrs. John Wemyss & Co.
16 October	Berceau	Cornaline-class corvette		Lorient	France	For French Navy.
29 October	Resolution	Brig	William Gales	Sunderland	United Kingdom	For Langley & Co.
October	Albion	Barque		Yarmouth	(United Kingdom of Great Britain and Ireland) Colony of Nova Scotia	For private owner.
10 November	Pestonjee Bomanjee	Barque	James Lang	Dumbarton	United Kingdom	For John Miller Jr. & Co.
13 November	Caroline	Barque		Saint John	(United Kingdom of Great Britain and Ireland) Colony of New Brunswick	For Hugh Mackay.
14 November	Augusta	Lifeboat	Robert Sunman	Sheringham	United Kingdom	For Sheringham Lifeboat Society.
15 November	Jane	Brig		Saint John	(United Kingdom of Great Britain and Ireland) Colony of New Brunswick	For private owner.
29 November	Ellen	full-rigged ship	Balley	Shoreham-by-Sea	United Kingdom	For private owner.
29 November	Cornaline	Cornaline-class corvette		Lorient	France	For French Navy.
2 December	Criterion	Schooner	John Young	Newport	United Kingdom	For Messrs. Delaney & Co.
2 December	Royal Victoria	Paddle steamer	Menzies & Son	Leith	United Kingdom	For London, Leith, Edinburgh and Glasgow Shipping Company.
18 December	Charles	Schooner	John Christopher	Southwold	United Kingdom	For private owner.
31 December	Mary Somerville	East Indiaman	Steele & Co.	Liverpool	United Kingdom	For Taylor, Potter & Co.
December	Mars	Barque		Sunderland	United Kingdom	For Mr. Battersby.
Unknown date	Acorn	Barque		Howrah	India	For private owner.
Unknown date	Adventure	Sloop		Brisbane Water	(United Kingdom of Great Britain and Ireland) New South Wales	For private owner.
Unknown date	Albatross	Steamship	Brownlow, Pearson & Co.	Hull	United Kingdom	For private owner.
Unknown date	Alfred	Schooner	J. Hall	Sunderland	United Kingdom	For Eno & Co.
Unknown date	Agility	Snow		Sunderland	United Kingdom	For R. Liddle.
Unknown date	Allendale	Snow	J. Chipchase	Sunderland	United Kingdom	For private owner.
Unknown date	Athelstan	Merchantman		Sunderland	United Kingdom	For Brown & Co.
Unknown date	Augusta Jessie	Barque	W. Adamson	Sunderland	United Kingdom	For Mr. Chamberlin.
Unknown date	Beau Ideal	Merchantman	John Ball Jr.	Salcombe	United Kingdom	For John Ball and others.
Unknown date	Blenheim	Merchantman		Jarrow	United Kingdom	For Brown & Co.
Unknown date	Busy	Smack	Robert Reay	Sunderland	United Kingdom	For private owner.
Unknown date	Camperdown	Barque			United Kingdom	For private owner.
Unknown date	Cartaretta	Snow	W. Adamson	Monkwearmouth	United Kingdom	For R. Alsop.
Unknown date	Coromandel	Full-rigged ship		Quebec	(United Kingdom of Great Britain and Ireland) Upper Canada	For Mr. Ridgeway.
Unknown date	Crusader	Full-rigged ship		South Shields	United Kingdom	For private owner.
Unknown date	Cubana	Snow	Philip Laing	Sunderland	United Kingdom	For P. Laing.
Unknown date	Dundee	Paddle steamer	J. Wood	Hull	United Kingdom	For private owner.
Unknown date	Eamont	Merchantman	J. Barkes	Sunderland	United Kingdom	For Abbott & Co.
Unknown date	Earl of Lonsdale	Paddle steamer	T. & J. Brocklebank	Whitehaven	United Kingdom	For Whitehaven Navigation Company.
Unknown date	Enterprise	Schooner		Sunderland	United Kingdom	For Mr. Fenwick.
Unknown date	Ethelbert	Merchantman	G. Frater	Sunderland	United Kingdom	For T. & R. Brown.
Unknown date	Eurus	Merchantman	W. Byers	Sunderland	United Kingdom	For W. Byers.
Unknown date	Forfarshire	Paddle steamer	Thomas Adamson	Dundee	United Kingdom	For Dundee and Hull Steam Packet Company.
Unknown date	Georgina	Barque		Liverpool	United Kingdom	For private owner.
Unknown date	Gosforth	Merchantman	G. & J. T. Alcock	Sunderland	United Kingdom	For private owner.
Unknown date	Greenwell	Barque	W. Chilton	Sunderland	United Kingdom	For Mr Greenwell.
Unknown date	Haddo House	Snow	W. Chilton	Sunderland	United Kingdom	For Dunn & Co.
Unknown date	Hampshire	Barque	Halls	Sunderland	United Kingdom	For Beatie & Co.
Unknown date	Henry Tanner	Barque	W. Cornforth	Sunderland	United Kingdom	For George Fawcus & Robert Pow
Unknown date	Incertus	Schooner	W. Corntorth	Sunderland	United Kingdom	For Mr Thackary.
Unknown date	Josephine	Man of war			Sweden	For Royal Swedish Navy.
Unknown date	Jubilee	Merchantman	Peter Austin	Sunderland	United Kingdom	For Thomas Speeding.
Unknown date	Lady of St Kilda	Schooner	Robert Newman	Dartmouth	United Kingdom	For Sir Thomas Dyke Acland.
Unknown date	Lapwing	Full-rigged ship	Kirkbride & Partners	Sunderland	United Kingdom	For Douglas & Co.
Unknown date	Lily	Sloop	William Bonker	Salcombe	United Kingdom	For William Beer and others.
Unknown date	Maria & Elizabeth	Merchantman	T. Ogden	Sunderland	United Kingdom	For Mr. Greenwell.
Unknown date	Mary & Dorothy	Brig	T. Reed	Sunderland	United Kingdom	For T. Ridley.
Unknown date	Mary Laing	Barque	Philip Laing	Sunderland	United Kingdom	For P. Laing.
Unknown date	Minerva	Paddle steamer	William Fairbairn & Sons	Manchester	United Kingdom	For Franz Carl Caspar & Johan Jacob Lämmlin.
Unknown date	Najaden	Corvette			Sweden	For Royal Swedish Navy.
Unknown date	Olga	Barque	James Johnson	Sunderland	United Kingdom	For T. Hunter.
Unknown date	Omnibus	Schooner	Frederick Preston	Great Yarmouth	United Kingdom	For private owner.
Unknown date	Ophelia & Anne	Snow	S. & P. Mills	Sunderland	United Kingdom	For A. White & Co.
Unknown date	Ophelia White	Snow	Kirkbride & partners	Sunderland	United Kingdom	For A. White & Co.
Unknown date	Orus	Snow	Peter Austin	Sunderland	United Kingdom	For Richard Greenwell.
Unknown date	Ovis	Snow	W. Byers	Sunderland	United Kingdom	For J. Graydon.
Unknown date	Perfect	East Indiaman		Quebec	(United Kingdom of Great Britain and Ireland) Upper Canada	For private owner.
Unknown date	Persian	Snow	L. Crown	Sunderland	United Kingdom	For Hunter & Co.
Unknown date	Perth	Paddle steamer	J. Wood	Hull	United Kingdom	For private owner.
Unknown date	Pink	Sloop	William Bonker	Salcombe	United Kingdom	For Samuel Beer & William Beer.
Unknown date	Rebecca	Sloop	George Plummer	Rosevears	(United Kingdom of Great Britain and Ireland) Van Dieman's Land	For Robert Scott.
Unknown date	Royalist	Schooner		Cowes	United Kingdom	For T. L. Lane.
Unknown date	Sarah	Snow	Peter Austin	Sunderland	United Kingdom	For Mr. Stephens.
Unknown date	Taje	Schooner		Bombay	India	For Imaum of Muscat.
Unknown date	Tesrifiye	Second rate			(Ottoman Empire) Crete	For Ottoman Navy.
Unknown date	Thomas	Brig			United Kingdom	For private owner.
Unknown date	Thomas Harrison	Barque	John M. Gales	Sunderland	United Kingdom	For private owner.
Unknown date	Warsaw	Ship of the line		Nicholaieff	Russia	For Imperial Russian Navy.
Unknown date	William	Schooner	William Gales	Sunderland	United Kingdom	For Will Hetherington.
Unknown date	W. S. Hamilton	Barque		Sunderland	United Kingdom	For Carson & Co.
