= Charles Rathbone Low =

Indian Navy officer and historian

Lieutenant Charles Rathbone Low FRGS (1837 – 1918) was an Indian Navy officer and writer.

== Background ==
The son of Major John Handcock Low of the East India Company and of the 39th Bengal Native Infantry, he was born in Dublin, in 1837.

His father was killed in 1849 at Rajmahal. He was born in 1805, the youngest son of William John Low of Lowville, County Galway, and his wife the Hon. Sophie Hamilton, daughter of Richard Hamilton, 4th Viscount Boyne; he married Emily Revell in 1830, and she died in 1847. He married again, in 1848, to Clementina Clara Jane Hockley, daughter of Joseph Hockley.

William Low, who served with the 67th Regiment of Foot, was the son of Nathaniel Low(e) of Lowville, who married Jane Handcock. She was the daughter of Robert Handcock, brother of Dean Richard Hancock, and his wife Jane Blackburne.

== Life ==
Charles Rathbone Low was taken to India when a few months old, and attended school in Simla. He returned to live in England at the age of seven, and was orphaned.

Low joined the East India Company's Navy in 1853, and took part in the suppression of piracy and slave trading in the Indian and China Seas, the Persian Gulf, the Red Sea, and off the East Coast of Africa. He wrote in his History of the Indian Navy of serving in the HCS Mahi; he was a midshipman on her from 1855, and rose to the rank of lieutenant.

When the Navy was closed down in 1863, Low became a professional writer, in England. He was the first Librarian and Assistant Secretary of the Royal United Service Institution, 1865–68. He represented the Indian Navy at the Jubilee Service of Empress Victoria, 1887 and other royal events.

== Works ==
Low published books in a number of genres. He was also a prolific author of magazine articles. He began his writing career with a mixture of juvenile adventure stories and factual articles in Cassell's Magazine, Chambers's Journal, The Leisure Hour, The Quiver and Routledge's Magazine for Boys. Tucker calls him an "indefatigable exhibitor of national kudos", as well as "a patriotic crank of the old school".

=== Geographical ===
- Low, Charles Rathbone (1867). "Abyssinia and its Routes". The People's Magazine, An Illustrated Miscellany for All Classes. Vol. 1, no. 48, 2 November. London: Society for Promoting Christian Knowledge. pp. 760–763.

Low was a Referee for the Royal Geographical Society, of which he was a Fellow. The Land of the Sun (1870) was travel writing, with the full subtitle of Sketches of Travel, with Memoranda, Historical and Geographical, of Places of Interest in the East. He worked on The India Directory, for the guidance of commanders of steamers and sailing vessels (from 1874) of Alfred Dundas Taylor, another former Indian Navy officer, a replacement for the work on charts of James Horsburgh.

=== Historical ===
- The Great Battles of the British Navy (1872)
- The Great Battles of the British Army (1885), with Henry Yule
- History of the Indian Navy (1877, 2 vols.), originally published in 1876–7 in parts, in Colburn's United Service Magazine.
- Maritime Discovery: A History of Nautical Discovery from the Earliest Times (1882, 2 vols.)
- Captain Cook's Three Voyages (1892)
- Her Majesty's Navy: including its deeds and battles (c.1892, 3 vols.)

=== Biographies ===
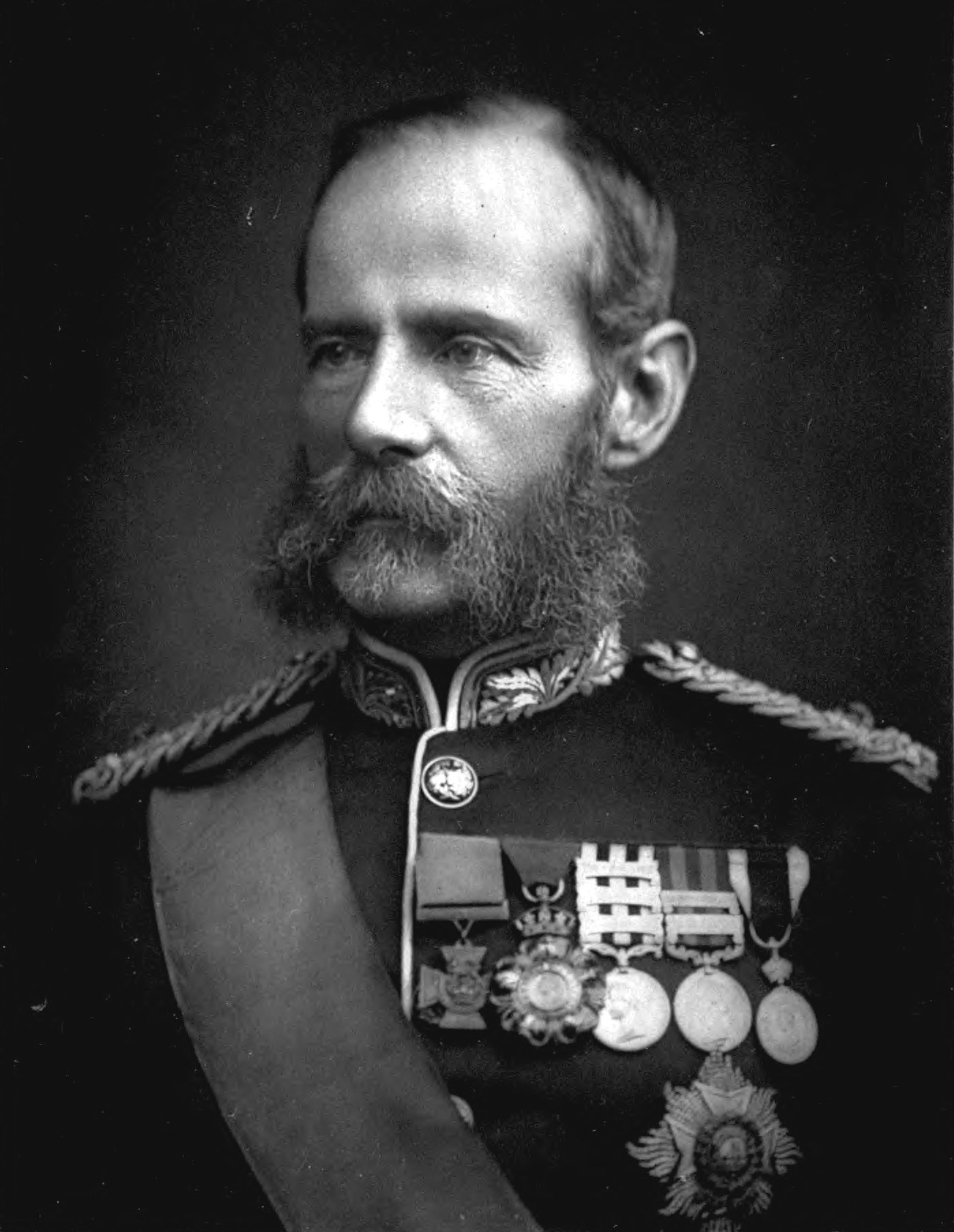
General Frederick Sleigh Roberts, illustration from Charles Rathbone Low's 1883 biography

- Soldiers of the Victorian Age (1880, 2 vols.)
- Life and Correspondence of Field-Marshall Sir G. Pollock, Bart. (1873), on Sir George Pollock, 1st Baronet.
- A Memoir of Lieutenant-General Sir Garnet J. Wolseley (1878, 2 vols.), on Garnet Wolseley, 1st Viscount Wolseley.
- The Afghan War, 1838–1842; from the Journal and Correspondence of the Late Major-General Augustus Abbott (1879), on Augustus Abbott.
- Sir F. S. Roberts: A Memoir (1883) on Frederick Roberts, 1st Earl Roberts
- Memoir of Major-General J. T. Boileau (1887), with preface by Henry Yule
- Great African Travellers, with William Henry Giles Kingston

=== Fiction ===
- Tales of Old Ocean (1869)
- The Adventures of Joshua Hawsepipe, Master Mariner: A Tale of the Sea and Land (1869)
- Tales of Naval Adventure (1872)
- The Letter of Marque and Tales of the Sea and Land (1873)
- The Autobiography of a Man-o'-War's Bell: A Tale of the Sea (1875)
- Cyril Hamilton: His Adventures by Sea and Land (1885)

=== Poetry ===
Tucker writes of Low's "fleet of 1890s epics".

- Old England's Navy. An epic of the sea (1891)
- Cressy to Tel-El-Kebir: A Narrative Poem, Descriptive of the Deeds of the British Army (1892)
- Britannia's Bulwarks: An historical poem descriptive of the deeds of the British Navy (1895)
- The Epic of Olympus: A Narrative Poem Descriptive of the Deeds of the Deities and Heroes of Greek Mythology (1897)

== Family ==
Low married in 1861 Catherine Charlotte Boileau, daughter of John Theophilus Boileau, and they had 13 children. The children included sons Hamilton John Windsor Low and Gustavus Edward Boileau Low, and daughters Emily Elizabeth Wetherall, Jane, and Elizabeth Margaret Thorp.
