= Medina (1811 ship) =

History

United Kingdom
- Name: Medina
- Namesake: Medina River
- Builder: Robert Davy, Topsham, Devon
- Launched: 25 July 1811
- Fate: Condemned in July 1831

General characteristics
- Tons burthen: 467, or 46752/94, or 469, or 470 (bm)
- Armament: 4 × 9-pounder guns + 14 × 12-pounder carronades

Medina was launched in 1811, and quickly became a West Indiaman. Ten years later she started sailing to the East Indies under a license from the British East India Company (EIC). She made two voyages transporting convicts to Australia, first to Sydney and then to Hobart. She also brought immigrants to the Swan River Colony. On that voyage she sustained damage that caused her to be condemned in July 1831.

== Career ==
Medina first appeared in Lloyd's Register (LR) in 1811 with Kenneday, master, Davy & Co., owners, and trade Exmouth–London. She then became a West Indiaman.

Year	Master	Owner	Trade	Source & notes
1815	Kenneday	Davy & Co.	London–Jamaica	LR; damages repaired 1814
1820	Kenneday	Green & Co.	London–Jamaica	LR; damages repaired 1814

A gale on 20 October 1820, at Deal drove Medina, Kennedy, master, causing her to lose an anchor. She rode out the gale with one anchor.

In 1813, the EIC had lost its monopoly on the trade between India and Britain. British ships were then free to sail to India or the Indian Ocean under a license from the EIC.

On 18 November 1821, Medina, Mattison, master, sailed from Gravesend, bound for Bombay. On 16 December, she put in as Plymouth leaky in her upper works, having to be caulked. She had reached as far as longitude 8°, but had to put back because of strong, adverse gales. A few days later she had to be moved up the Catwater to be moored for the necessary repairs. On 26 December, she was still at Plymouth, repairing. A report dated Plymouth, 15 January 1822, stated that she had almost completed her repairs and was expected to sail shortly for Bombay.

On 25 January 1822, Medina, Mattison, master, sailed for Bombay, sailing under a license from the EIC. She arrived at Bombay on 7 June. On 25 October, Medina, Owens, master (late Mattison), was at the Cape of Good Hope. She sailed on 2 November, for Liverpool. She arrived at Liverpool on 3 March 1823, with Brown, master, after having stopped at Milford to effect some repairs.

1st convict voyage (1823): Captain Robert Brown sailed from Cork on 5 September 1823 and arrived at Sydney on 23 December. She had embarked 177 convicts and she landed 176.

2nd convict voyage (1825): Captain John Briggs sailed from the Downs on 26 April 1825, and arrived at Hobart on 14 September. She had embarked 180 male convicts and disembarked 178, having suffered two convict deaths en route. She arrived at Bengal from New South Wales on 25 January 1826. On 9 March, she sailed from Bengal for London but had to put back four days later. She had grounded on the James and Mary Sand and was unloading on the 24th, prior to being surveyed. She sailed from Bengal on 25 June. She then sailed from St Helena on 28 September, having come via Mauritius where she had stopped between 7 and 13 August. She arrived at Gravesend on 12 December.

Year	Master	Owner	Trade	Source
1827	Briggs	Hayman	London–New South Wales	LR; damages repaired 1822 and large repair 1823
1831	Briggs	Hayman	London–Swan River	LR; large repair 1823 and small repair 1827

== Fate ==
In January 1830, Captain W. Pace sailed Medina for the Swan River. She arrived on 6 July. She was carrying 16 cabin passengers, 34 steerage passengers, and 27 crew. She lost her anchors on 19 July, and Captain Pace made for Britannia Roads. On the way she grounded on the Parmelia Reef. On 23 July, she was pulled off the reef with the assistance of boats and men from HMS Cruizer and Sulphur.

Captain Pace had planned to sail on 30 August, for Batavia, but had to delay his departure to 30 September, due to damage to Medina's keel. At Batavia Medina underwent repairs that cost more than she was worth. From there she sailed to Manila. She then sailed from Manila.

Lloyd's List reported on 25 November 1831, that Medina had put into Sourabaya in distress. It reported on 16 December 1831, that Medina had been condemned there in July as unseaworthy, and sold for breaking up.
