= Aden Expedition =

1839 British capture of the Yemeni port

- Part of the conquest of Aden
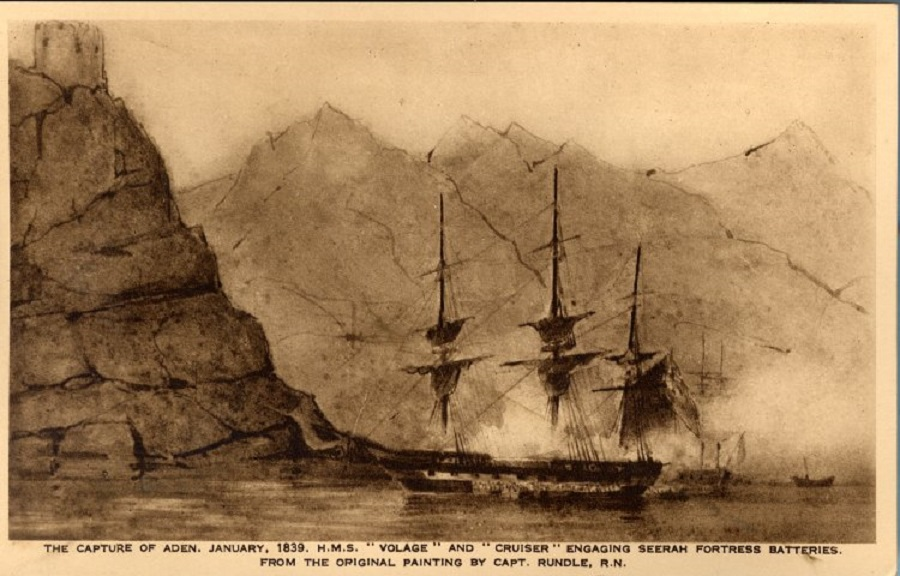
- Contemporary painting showing British warships engaging Sira fortress batteries
Date	19 January 1839
Location	Aden, Yemen 12°48′N 45°02′E
Result	British victory
Territorial changes	British colonisation of Aden

Belligerents
United Kingdom	Lahej

Commanders and leaders
(United Kingdom of Great Britain and Ireland) Henry Smith	(Sultanate of Lahej) Muhsin ibn al-Fadl

Strength
Land: 700 infantry Sea: 1 frigate 1 corvette 1 brig 1 schooner	700 infantry 33 artillery pieces 1 fort

Casualties and losses
None; 1 corvette damaged	150 killed or wounded 139 captured 33 artillery pieces captured 1 fort captured
- Location within Yemen

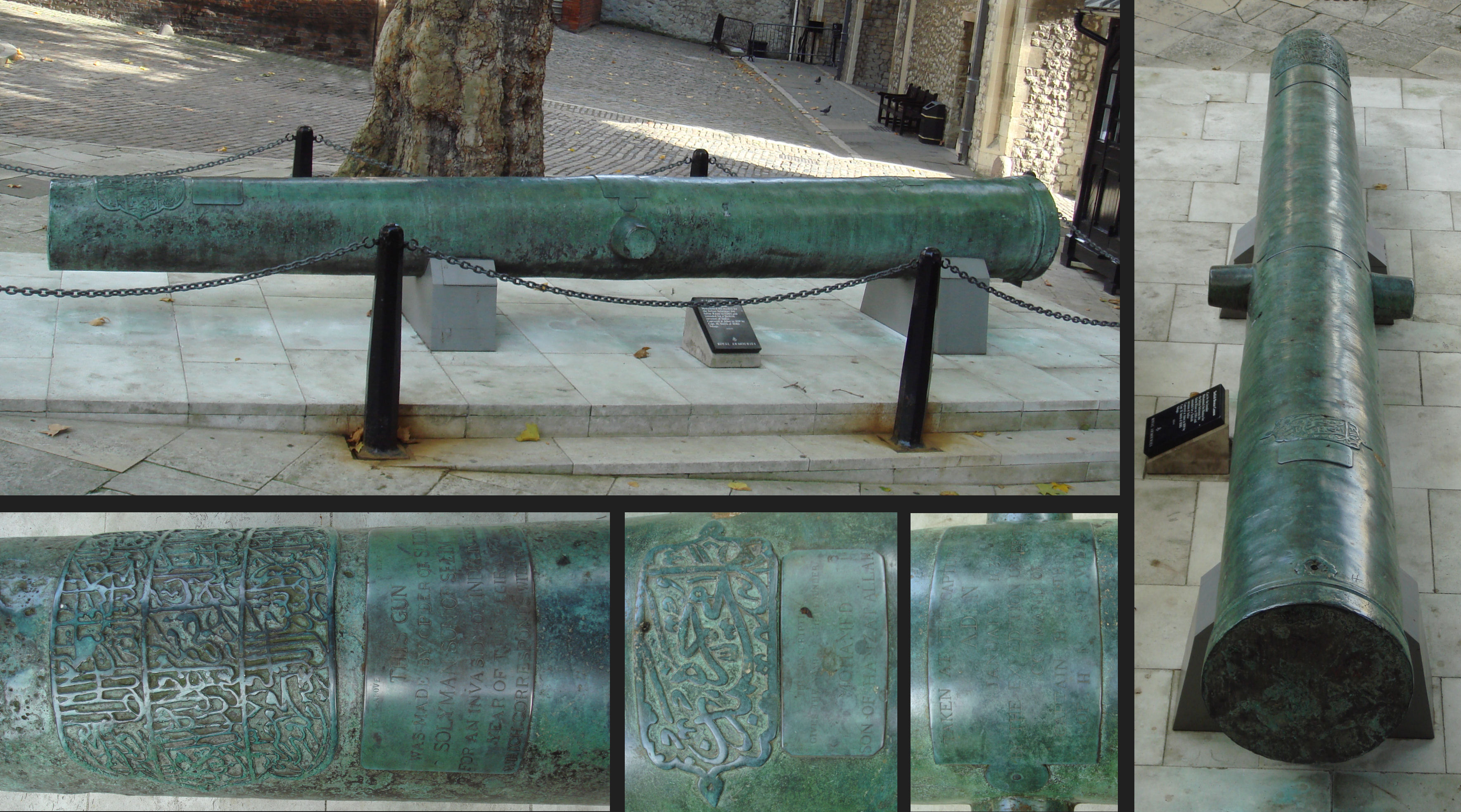
Cannon made in 1531 for the Ottoman expedition of India and captured at Sira by the Royal Navy in 1839, now in the Tower of London.

The Aden Expedition was a naval operation that the British Royal Navy carried out in January 1839. Following Britain's decision to invade the Port of Aden as a coaling station for the steamers sailing the new Suez-Bombay route, the Sultan of Lahej, who owned Aden, resisted, which led to a series of skirmishes between the two sides. In response to the incidents, a small force of warships and soldiers of the East India Company were sent to Arabia. The expedition succeeded in defeating the Arab defenders, who held the fortress on Sira Island, and occupied the nearby port of Aden. The Sultan and his family fled Aden and sought shelter in Lahej.

== Order of battle ==
Royal Navy:

- HMS Volage, frigate (28 guns)
- HCS Coote, sloop (18 guns)
- HMS Cruizer, brig (18 guns)
- HCS Mahi, schooner (5 guns)

== See also ==
- Punitive expedition
- Nukapu Expedition
- Johanna Expedition
