= HMS Sulphur (1826) =

British naval bomb vessel

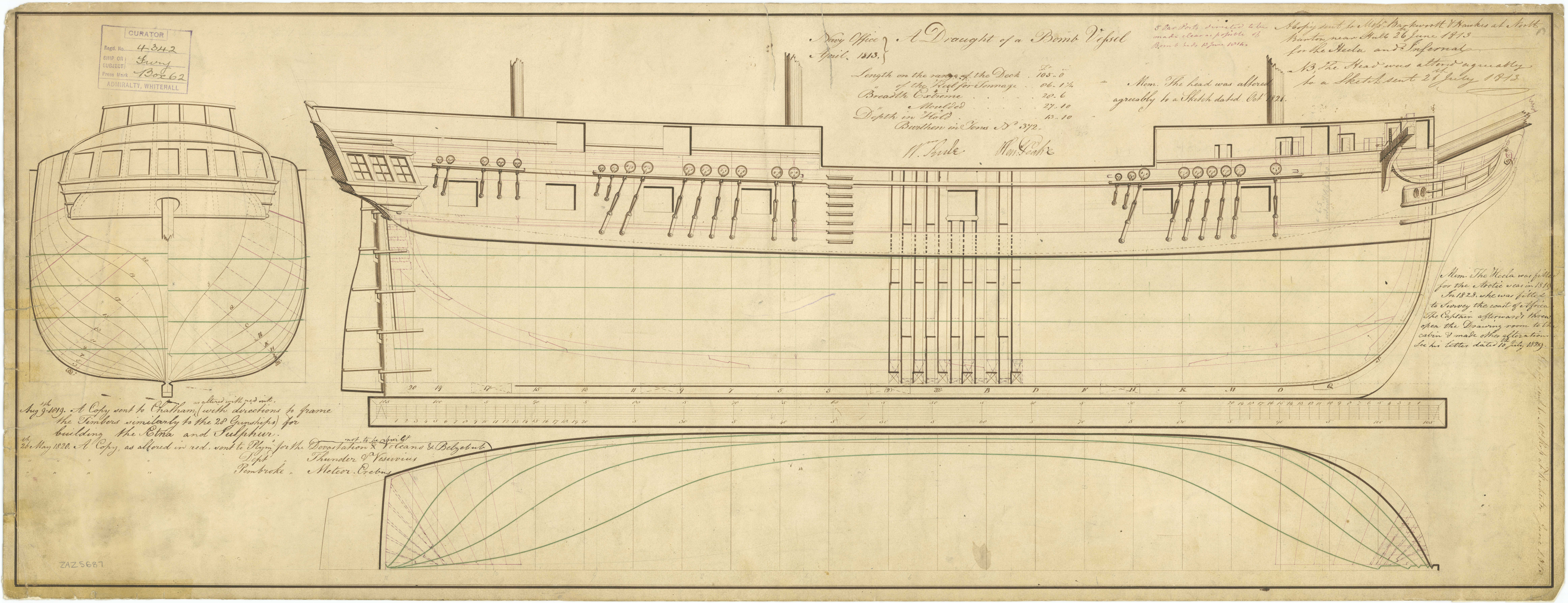
- Sulphur original plan

History

United Kingdom
- Name: HMS Sulphur
- Ordered: 18 May 1819
- Builder: Chatham Dockyard, Kent
- Laid down: May 1824
- Launched: 26 January 1826
- Completed: 21 February 1826
- Reclassified: Converted to survey ship, December 1835.; Receiving ship at Woolwich from May 1843.
- Fate: Broken up by 20 November 1857

General characteristics
- Class & type: Hecla-class bomb vessel
- Tons burthen: 372 1/94 tons bm
- Length: 105 ft (32.0 m) (overall); 86 ft 1.25 in (26.2 m) (keel)
- Beam: 28 ft 6 in (8.7 m)
- Depth of hold: 13 ft 10 in (4.22 m)
- Propulsion: Sails
- Sail plan: Full-rigged
- Complement: 67
- Armament: 10 × 24-pounder carronades; 2 × 6-pounder guns; 1 × 13-inch (330 mm) mortar; 1 × 10-inch (250 mm) mortar

HMS Sulphur was a 10-gun Hecla-class bomb vessel of the British Royal Navy, famous as one of the ships in which Edward Belcher explored the Pacific coast of the Americas.

== Ship history ==
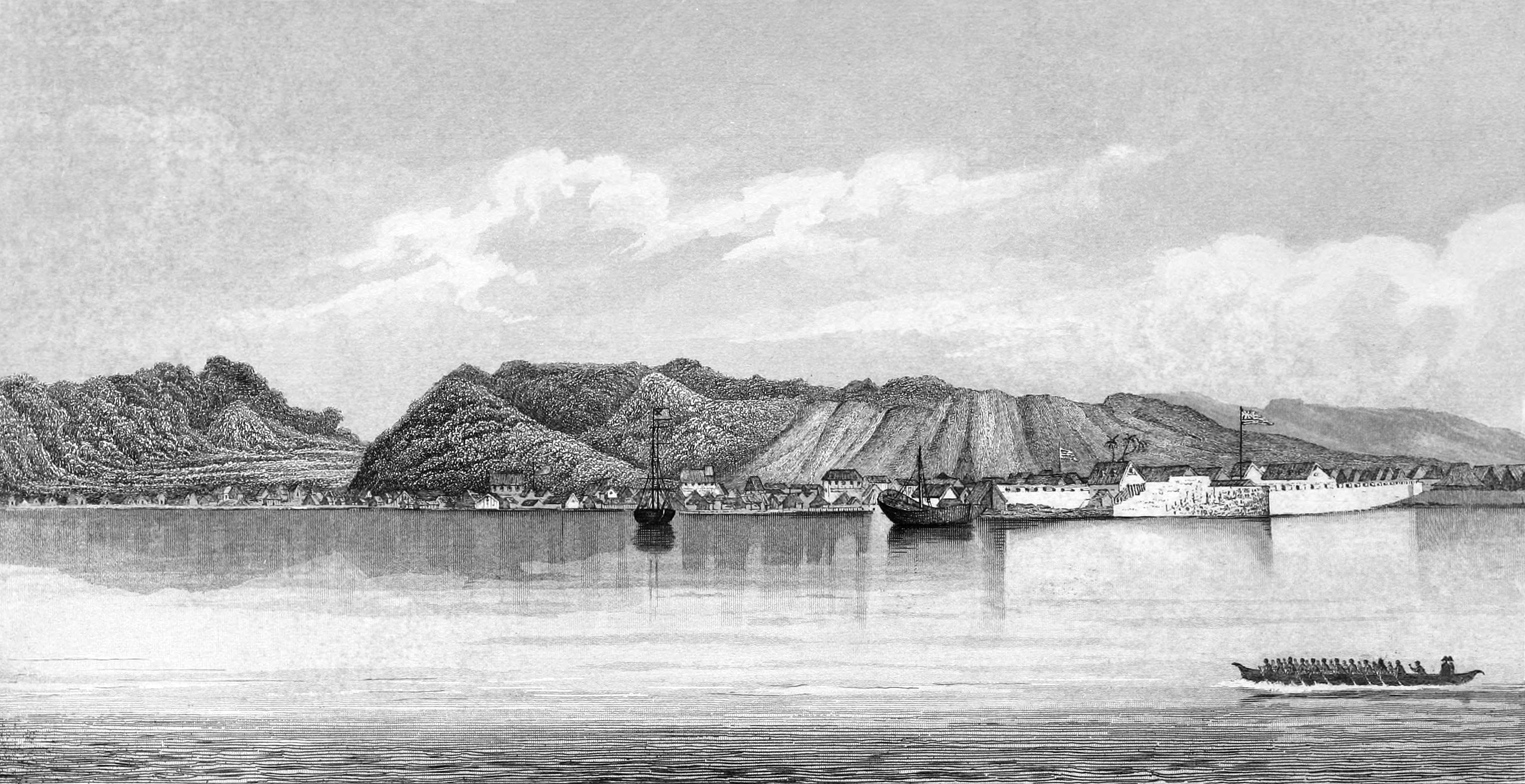
Belcher's visit to Honolulu fort, Oahu, Sandwich Islands

Sulphur was launched in 1826, and in 1829 carried Lieutenant-Colonel Frederick Irwin, officers, passengers and a detachment of troops from the 63rd Regiment of Foot to the Swan River Colony. On 23 July 1830, boats and men from HMS Cruizer and Sulphur pulled Medina off the Parmelia Reef near the Swan River. Medina had grounded while delivering immigrants.

Sulphur was converted to a survey ship in 1835 and together with HMS Starling sailed for the Pacific Ocean. Captain Frederick Beechey commanded the expedition under orders to survey the Pacific coast "from Valparaíso to 63°30' N." By the time the ship reached Valparaíso on 9 June 1836, Beechey had become too ill to continue leading the vessel and departed for the United Kingdom. Henry Kellett replaced Beechey and sailed for Panama City where the expedition waited for a replacement officer. Edward Belcher arrived at the port in March 1837 as the new officer and the expedition continued its operations, sailing for the Federal Republic of Central America.

Sulphur reached the capital of Russian America, New Archangel, on 11 September where Governor Ivan Kupreyanov greeted the British with a colonial ball. Departing south, Sulphur reached the site of the first Nootka Convention, Yuquot, on 3 October. After meeting with local Nuu-chah-nulth dignitaries, the British vessel then went to the mouth of the Columbia River. Bad weather prevented the ship from reaching Fort Vancouver and instead sailed south for Yerba Buena in Alta California. Sulphur returned to the Columbia River on 28 July 1839. After visiting Fort Vancouver the expedition went south, reaching San Blas on 24 November, where it remained until December. Sailing for the Marquesas Islands, Sulphur reached the archipelago in January 1840.

EIC ship Nemesis, with boats from the Sulphur, Calliope, Larne and Starling, destroying Chinese war junks in Anson's Bay, on 7 January 1841.

She participated in the First Opium War between 1840 and 1841.

On 21 July 1841, HMS Sulphur was damaged in the 1841 Hong Kong typhoon resulting in her total dismasting.

The ship was used to survey the harbour of Hong Kong in 1841 and returned to England in 1842. She was used for harbour service from 1843, and was broken up by 20 November 1859, by then the last bomb vessel on the Navy List.

Richard Brinsley Hinds (1811-1846) served as surgeon on Sulphur 1835-42. He was a naturalist, and collected numerous samples of plants and marine animals for study. He edited The Botany of the Voyage of H.M.S. Sulphur and The Zoology of the Voyage of H.M.S. Sulphur (1844). The introduction to Zoology, Volume 1 provides a detailed description of the voyage.

Sulphur Channel on the north shore of Hong Kong Island was named after the ship.

== See also ==
- European and American voyages of scientific exploration
- List of bomb vessels of the Royal Navy
