= Barton Grindrod =

English cricketer

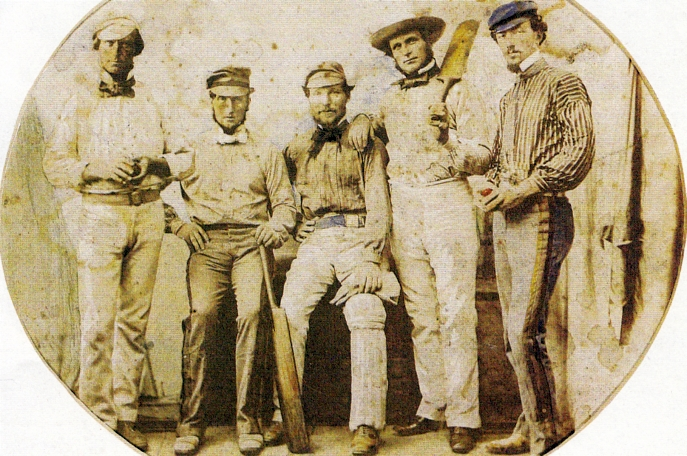
- Barton Grindrod (2nd from left)

Personal information
- Born: 25 April 1834; Liverpool, England
- Died: 23 May 1895 (aged 61); Liverpool, England

Domestic team information
- Years: Team
- 1858-1860: Victoria
- Source: Cricinfo, 2 May 2015

Barton Grindrod (25 April 1834 – 23 May 1895) was an English cricketer. He played two first-class cricket matches for Victoria between 1858 and 1860.

== Background ==
Barton was born in Liverpool. His mother, Margaret Barton (1805-1852) was the daughter of a Liverpool Iron Master. His father, John Grindrod (1801-1856), was a physician working in the Liverpool Royal Southern and Toxteth Park Hospitals. He was also a keen yachtsman, a member of the Royal Thames Yacht Club, and the first commodore of the Royal Mersey Yacht Club. Honorary members of this club included Prime Minister Sir Robert Peel. Barton's uncle, naval architect and engineer Jonathan Grindrod (1804-1896), was also involved with the Royal Mersey Yacht Club, being the Rear-Commodore. He was responsible for the initial design work on the ill-fated clipper Royal Charter. The ship was subsequently purchased whilst still in construction and redesigned as a steam-auxiliary by William Patterson.

Barton Grindrod was the fifth of six children. He and his older brother, William (1832-1894), were educated at Cheltenham College as boarders. Barton left when he was fifteen years old in 1849. His brother William, who later became a Church of England minister, left in 1851 aged nineteen and continued his education at Trinity College, Cambridge, where he was awarded a B.A. in 1855. (Note: William's grandson was Sir John Basil Rowland Grindrod, Primate of Australia, 1982-1989) Barton's four sisters married into families involved with mercantile businesses in Liverpool.

== Australia ==
By 1857 Barton Grindrod was living in Melbourne, Australia. He was a member of the business community, being elected to the Chamber of Commerce in about June of that year. He imported two "cases" of furniture in 1857, but in December 1858 he was selling "the whole of the modern and useful furniture, and effects" by auction from his residence in Hawthorne.

== Sri Lanka (Ceylon) ==
At some period after this date Barton took up residence in Sri Lanka (Ceylon), from where he operated in partnership with other merchants for about twenty years. Their businesses were described as “Colonial Merchants and Commission and Insurance Agents” They had some involvement with the tea trade, and in a letter to the editor of the Pall Mall Gazette, 30 January 1884, Barton also made claim to the export of eleven elephant to New York in 1871.

== Rameswaram Island shipping canal ==
Palk Strait (South Asia)

Barton Grindrod and his two partners (Elliott Bradbridge & Henry Jenkins) became involved with a proposal to cut a shipping canal through Rameswaram Island. This was in order to provide a continuously navigable sea route via the shallows of the Palk Strait that separates India from Sri Lanka. An agreement was drafted between the partners and the Secretary of State for India for the construction and management of the canal, following a route proposed by Sir John Coode. In 1887 shares were offered in the South India Ship Canal, Port and Coal Station Limited to finance the project. However, the canal was not constructed and agreement has still to be reached on how best to provide a deep water shipping channel through the Palk Strait; see article Sethusamudram Shipping Canal Project.

== Marriage ==
In 1881 Barton married Margaret Drysdale (Duncan) Lawrance (1837-1910) in St James Westminster. She was from Aberdeen, Scotland, the daughter of Helen Drysdale Douglass (1815-1890) and advocate John Duncan (1801-1874). In 1870 Margaret married East India Company surgeon-major, Edward Alexander Lawrance, M.R.C.S.(1836–1873), a widower with one child. He died in Sri Lanka in 1873 aged 37 and was interred in Colombo Galle Face Burial Ground.

== Bankruptcy ==
Barton Grindrod was also in partnership with other merchants and these included Charles Durham, Vernon Cochrane and William Hector. They traded in Manchester and London under the firm of Durham and Company, at Rio de Janeiro under the firm of Charles Durham and Company, and at Colombo under the firm of Durham, Grindrod, and Company. In 1880 the businesses were unable to meet their financial commitments. The partners attempted to reach an agreement with their creditors, offering ten shillings in the pound. One creditor (the Merchant Banking Company) believed that the offer should be twelve shilling and six pence in the pound. The case went to court and eventually to appeal. Barton and his partners were declared bankrupt.

== Final years ==
The 1891 census shows him living with his widowed sister, Sarah (Grindrod) Pearce, in Crosby, Liverpool. Barton died on 23 May 1895 at Stanley House, Cosby, Liverpool aged 61 years. His funeral service was on Monday 27 May 1895 at St Luke's Church, Crosby.

== See also ==
- List of Victoria first-class cricketers

== Bibliography ==
Skirving, Edward Scot (1928). Cheltenham College Register, 1841-1927. p. 36.
