= Sethusamudram Shipping Canal Project =

Canal between India and Sri Lanka

Coordinates: 9°05′38″N 79°32′48″E

Sethusamudram Shipping Channel Project
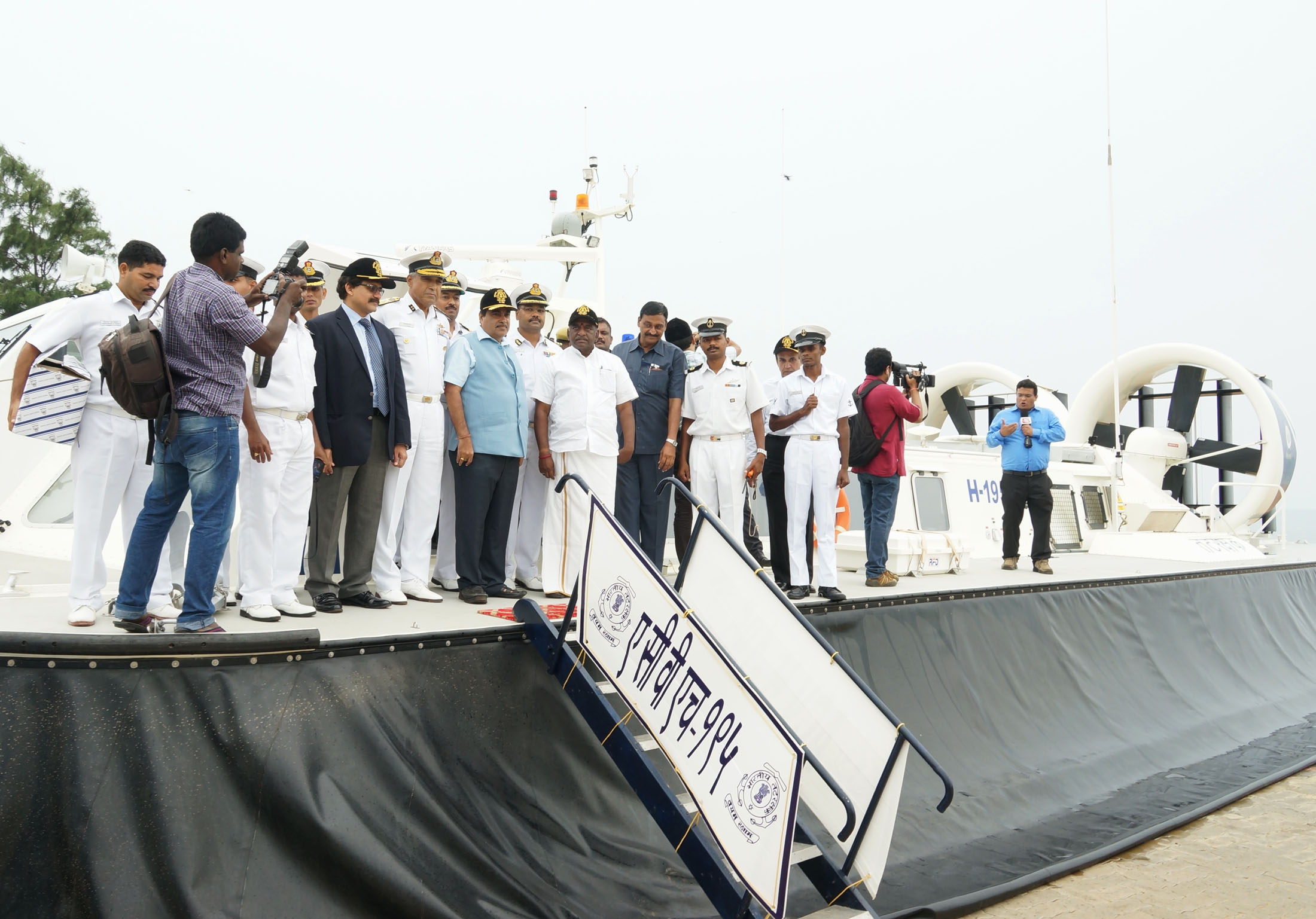
- Minister Nitin Gadkari inspecting the Sethusamudram project site by Hovercraft
- Company type: Government of India
- Industry: Canal Project
- Founded: 2005
- Headquarters: Chennai, Tamil Nadu, India
- Area served: Tamil Nadu, India
- Key people: Shri A. Subbiah, IAS chairman, Tuticorin Port Trust & Chairman and managing director, Sethusamudram Corporation Limited

Sethusamudram Shipping Canal Project (lit. 'Setu Ocean Shipping Canal Project') is a proposed project to create a shipping route in the shallow straits between India and Sri Lanka. This would provide a continuously navigable sea route around the Indian Peninsula. The channel would be dredged in the Sethusamudram sea between Tamil Nadu and Sri Lanka, passing through the limestone shoals of Rama Sethu.

The project involves digging a 44.9-nautical-mile (51.7 mi; 83.2 km) long deepwater channel linking the shallow Palk Strait with the Gulf of Mannar. Conceived in 1860 by Alfred Dundas Taylor, it received approval of the Indian government in 2005.

The proposed route through the shoals of Rama Setu is opposed by some groups on religious, environmental and economical grounds. Five alternative routes were considered that avoid damage to the shoals.

== History ==
Because of its shallow waters, Sethusamudram—the sea separating Sri Lanka from India—presents a hindrance to navigation through the Palk Strait. Though trade across the India-Sri Lanka divide has been active since at least the first millennium BCE, it has been limited to small boats and dinghies. Larger oceangoing vessels coming from the West have had to navigate around Sri Lanka to reach India' eastern coast. Eminent British geographer Major James Rennell surveyed the region in late 18th century; he suggested that a "navigable passage could be maintained by dredging of the Ramisseram [sic]". Little notice was given to his proposal, perhaps because it came from "so young and an unknown officer", and the idea was only revived 60 years later. Efforts were made in 1838 to dredge the canal, but the passage did not remain navigable for any vessels except those with a shallow draft.

The project was conceived in 1860 by Commander A. D. Taylor of the Indian Marines and has been reviewed many times without a decision being made. It has been part of the election manifestos of all political parties during elections. The Government of India appointed the Sethu Samudram Project Committee in 1955—headed by Dr. A. Ramasamy Mudaliar—which was charged with examining the desirability of the project. After evaluating the costs and benefits, this committee found the project feasible and viable. However it strongly recommended an overland passage instead of a channel cutting through Rama's Bridge. A land passage would have several advantages, such as avoiding shifting sandbanks and navigational hazards. Several reviews of the proposals followed until the United Progressive Alliance Government of India headed by Prime Minister Manmohan Singh announced the inauguration of the project on 2 July 2005.

In 2008, Prime Minister Manmohan Singh appointed Rajendra K. Pachauri as the head of a six-member committee to look at an alternative alignment avoiding the sensitive Rama Sethu stretch. In 2013, the committee released its report calling the project "unviable both from the economic as well as ecological angles". The Indian government rejected the committee's report and decided to go ahead with the project in its current form. In 2014, the Modi government decided that the project would be implemented by deepening the Pamban pass which would save the Rama Setu from destruction. As of December 2020, the project remains unfinished. In July 2020, parliamentary leader T. R. Baalu presented a letter to Prime Minister Modi urging him to finish the project before 2024. In the letter, Baalu cited tensions between India and China over influence in Sri Lanka, claiming that China will gain too strong of a diplomatic and economic foothold in Sri Lanka if the Indian government does not continue development in the region. In March 2021 the closure of the project was announced. On 12 January 2023, the Tamilnadu Government unanimously passed a resolution demanding that the project be revived.

=== Alignments suggested by earlier committees ===
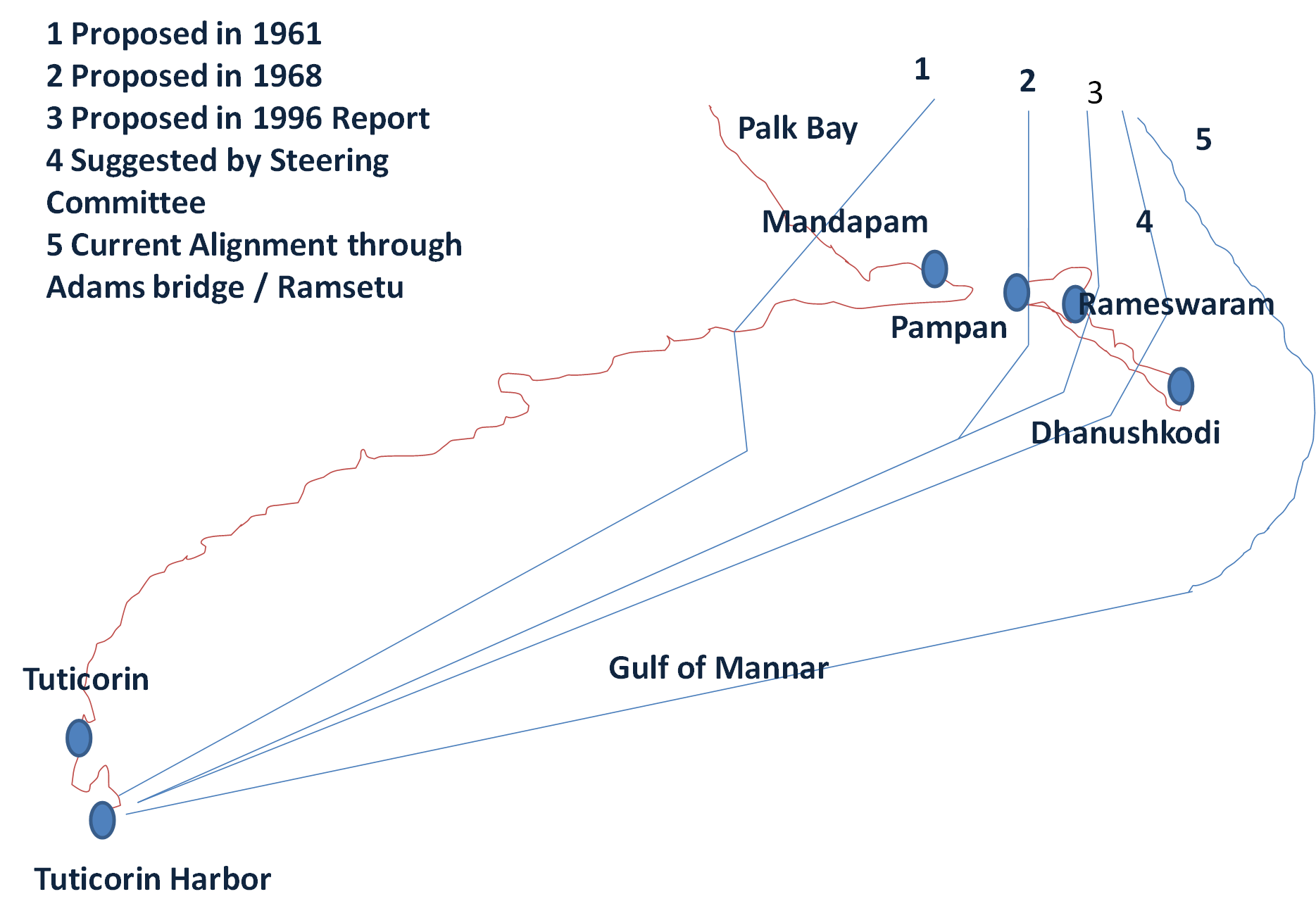
Opposition parties are demanding the implementation of the Sethusamudram canal project using one of five alternative alignments considered by the government earlier without damaging Rama's Bridge. The Indian government has constituted nine committees before Independence and five committees after independence, most of which have suggested a land-based alignment across Rameswaram Island. None of them have suggested an alignment across Rama's Bridge.

Year	Report Name	Suggested alignment route
1861	Townshend proposal	Deepen Pampan pass
1862	Parliamentary committee proposal	Two miles east of Pamban across Rameswaram Island
1863	William Dennison proposal	One mile east of Parliamentary proposal across Rameswaram Island
1871	Stoddart's Proposal	Almost same place as Parliamentary proposal across Rameswaram
1872	Robertson proposal	One mile from Pamban
1884	Sir John Coode proposal	Across Rameswaram Island
1903	Railway engineer proposal	Across Rameswaram Island
1922	Robert Bristo proposal	Across Rameswaram Island
1956	Sethusamudram project committee	Mainland at Mandapam island
1967	Nagendra committee report	Across Rameswaram Island
1981	Lakshminarayan committee report	Across Dhanuskodi Island 1 km west of Ramar Temple
1996	Pallavan transport consultancy report	Revalidated Lakshminaryan committee report. New alignment not suggested.
1996	Tuticorin port trust report	Across Pamban island East of Ramar Temple
2005	Current alignment most favoured	Mid ocean passage across Rama Setu
2010	Alignment approval subject to Environmental Report: Supreme Court of India, Project delayed sine die	Mid ocean Passage across Rama Setu

== Issues ==
=== Economic ===
Some naval hydrographers and experts suggest that the project is unlikely to be financially viable or serve ships in any significant way. The time savings for ships sailing from Kanyakumari or Tuticorin is between 10 and 30 hours. Ships from destinations in the Middle East, Africa, Mauritius and Europe, would save an average of 8 hours using the canal. At the present tariff rates, ships from Africa and Europe will lose US$4,992 on every voyage because the savings in time for these ships are considerably lower than what is calculated in the DPR. This loss is significant because 65% of the canal's projected users are from Africa and Europe. If tariffs are lowered to a point where ships from Africa and Europe will not lose money from using the canal, the IRR of the project falls to 2.6%. This is a level at which even public infrastructure projects are rejected by the government.

The canal is designed for ships of 30,000 metric tonnes and lighter. Most new ships weighing more than 60,000 tonnes and tankers weighing above 150,000 tonnes cannot use this canal.

=== Costs of project ===
Axis Bank Ltd. was appointed "loan arranger" for the project in 2005.Since its inception in 2004, costs have risen to at least ₹4,000 crore (US$420 million), interest rates have risen and old loan terms have lapsed. The loan sanctions, valid only up to ₹2,400 crore (US$250 million), lapsed. To secure more money, Sethusamudram Corp. Ltd would have to draw up new reports, sit with parliamentary committees and receive fresh approval. The project cost which originally were ₹24,700 crore (US$2.6 billion) will grow by almost ₹4,500 crore (US$470 million), a shipping ministry source said.

=== Environmental impact ===
The project would disturb the ecological balance and destroy corals and kill marine life. The area is an important fishing ground for Tamil Nadu and the Gulf of Mannar Marine National Park is in the vicinity of the proposed project. Opposition to the canal's planned route has come from local fishermen who are demanding alternative channels, which are available. They say the planned route would destroy marine life and corals and would impact the trade in conch shells that is worth almost ₹150 crore (US$16 million) a year. Deposits of thorium, important for nuclear fuel requirements, would also be affected. Opponents also say that the dumping of dredged material from the Palk Strait and the Gulf of Mannar in deeper waters would "endanger those areas, which are rich reserves containing 400 endangered species, including whales, sea turtles, dugongs and dolphins".

Tsunami expert Professor Tad Murty—who advised the Government of India on the tsunami warning system—has said that the planned route may result in increased impact from tsunami waves. He wrote, "During the Indian Ocean tsunami of 26 December 2004, the southern part of Kerala was generally spared from a major tsunami, mainly because the tsunami waves from Sumatra region travelling south of the Sri Lankan island, partially diffracted northward and affected the central part of the Kerala coast. Since the tsunami is a long gravity wave (similar to tides and storm surges) during the diffraction process, the rather wide turn it has to take spared the south Kerala coast. On the other hand, deepening the Sethu Canal might provide a more direct route for the tsunami and this could impact south Kerala."

On 21 April 2010, the Supreme Court of India decided to delay the project until an Environmental impact analysis on the feasibility of a route through Dhanuskodi instead of Rama's Bridge had been carried out.

=== Religion ===
Opposition to the project came from some Hindu groups that want to preserve Rama’s Bridge as they believe it was created by Rama as described in the ancient epic Ramayana.
