= HCS Coote =

British East India Company naval vessel (1827–1845)

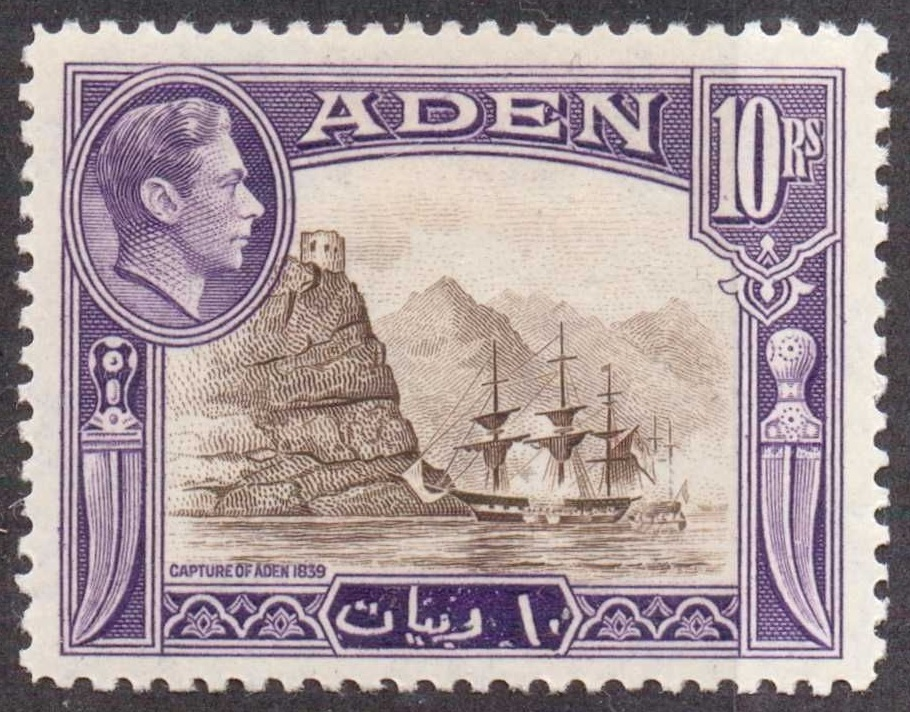
- Capture of Aden on a 1939 stamp marking the centenary

History

East India Company
- Operator: East India Company
- Launched: 1827
- Fate: Wrecked in 1845, later sank during attempted salvage

General characteristics
- Type: Sloop of war
- Tons burthen: 420 (bm)
- Decks: One
- Armament: 18 cannons

HCS Coote was a 18-gun sloop-of-war of the Bombay Marine and Indian Navy. She was launched at the Bombay Dockyard in 1827. Though the East India Company (EIC) built Coote, her size and armament were equivalent to the retired Cruizer-class brig-sloops. Coote participated in the 1839 Aden Expedition along with HCS Mahi and the frigate HMS Volage and the sloop HMS Cruizer of the Royal Navy.

== Fate ==
Coote was lost on 1 December 1845. She had left Bombay on 22 November, and wrecked at Calicut, on the Malabar Coast, on what became known as Coote Reef (11.23333°N 75.76667°E). (Note: One source gives the year of loss as 1846. Two sources give the date of loss as 1 December 1855, or simply as 1855.) Her officers and crew abandoned her as unsalvageable on 3 December. Her captain, Lieutenant J.S. Grieve, his officers, and crew all survived. All her guns, and a great deal of her stores and ammunition were saved. The EIC was able, eventually, to get her off the rocks. The company decided to sell the hull at Calicut rather than attempt to tow it to Bombay. A Calicut resident bought the hull for 10,000 rupees, but as she was being towed on shore where her leaks might be repaired, she sank into mud and appeared a total loss.
