= Snake-class ship-sloop =

Class of four Royal Navy sloops-of-war

Class overview
- Name: Snake class
- Operators: Royal Navy
- In service: 1797–1845
- Completed: 4

General characteristics
- Type: ship-sloop
- Tons burthen: 38241/94 (bm)
- Length: 100 ft (30.5 m) (overall); 77 ft 3 1/2 in (23.6 m) (keel)
- Beam: 30 ft 6 in (9.3 m)
- Depth of hold: 12 ft 9 in (3.9 m)
- Complement: 121
- Armament: 2 × 6-pounder bow guns; 16 × 32-pounder carronades

The Snake-class ship-sloops were a class of four Royal Navy sloops-of-war built in the late 18th and early 19th centuries. Though ships of the class were designed with the hull of a brig, their defining feature of a ship-rig changed their classification to that of a ship-sloop rather than that of a brig-sloop.

== Service history ==
In December 1796 the Royal navy placed orders for four new sloops. The Navy Board considered two differing schools of design, one led by Sir William Rule and another by Sir John Henslow. To compare the qualities of ship-rigged and brig-rigged vessels, a ship of each design was to be completed as a ship-sloop and the other as a brig-sloop. In the end the Henslow designs won out, resulting in the Snake and Cruizer-class being adopted into Royal Navy service.

The Snake-class ships were designed as 18 gun flush deck brigs with a three-masted ship rig. Of their 18 guns, 16 were 32-pounder Carronades, granting the ships a large amount of firepower for their size. In terms of crew and hull design, the Snake-class was identical to the more prevalent Cruzier-class. Two ships of the class were launched, HMS Snake and HMS Victor. Reception to the design was mixed; the mounting of a ship-rig on a brig's hull made the vessels unstable in heavy seas, but also increased the survive-ability of the ship in combat. Both of the original Snake-class ships were removed from service by 1810, and their role was soon filled by the larger and better armed Cyrus class.

In 1827 the Naval Board revived the 1797 design and launched two new Snake-class warships, HMS Childers and HMS Cruizer.

== Ships ==
- HMS Snake (1797)
- HMS Victor (1798)
- HMS Childers (1827)
- HMS Cruizer (1828)
