= HMS Cruizer (1828) =

Snake-class sloop-of-war

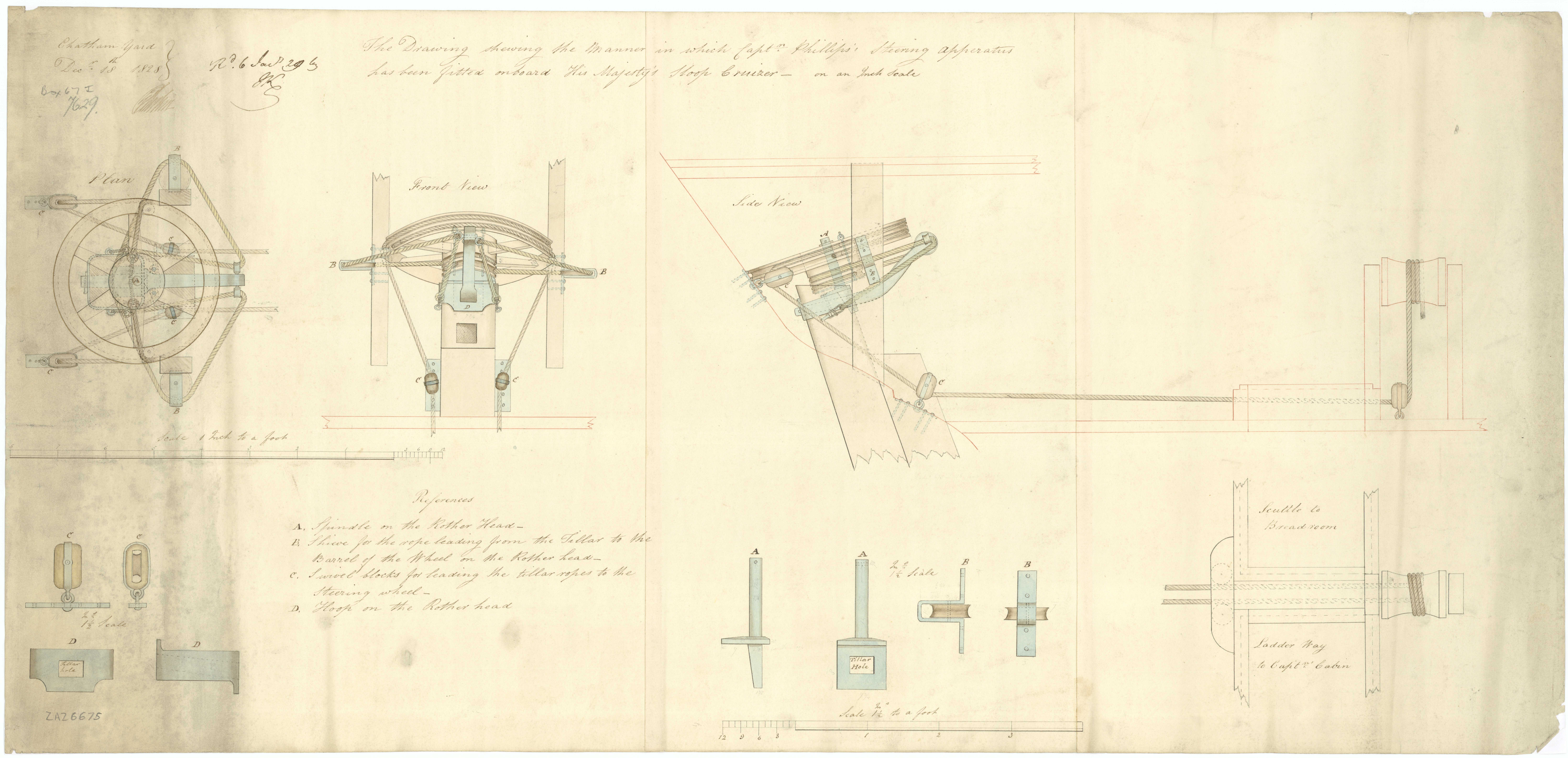
- Steering apparatus of Cruizer

History

United Kingdom
- Builder: Chatham Dockyard
- Laid down: January 1826
- Launched: 19 January 1828
- Fate: Sold March 1849

General characteristics
- Class & type: Snake-class ship-sloop
- Tons burthen: 38241/94 (bm)
- Length: 100 ft 0 in (30.5 m) (overall); 77 ft 3 1/4 in (23.6 m) (keel)
- Beam: 30 ft 6 in (9.3 m)
- Depth of hold: 12 ft 9 in (3.9 m)
- Decks: one
- Complement: 125
- Armament: 2 × 6-pounder bow guns; 16 × 32-pounder carronades

HMS Cruizer was a Snake-class ship-sloop launched in 1828 for the British Royal Navy. The ship was built as a revival of the retired Snake-class ship-sloops. The Navy converted her to a brig in 1831, back to a ship in 1840, and sold her at Bombay in 1849.

== Career ==
On 23 July 1830 boats and men from Cruizer and HMS Sulphur pulled Medina off the Parmelia Reef near the Swan River. Medina had grounded while delivering immigrants.

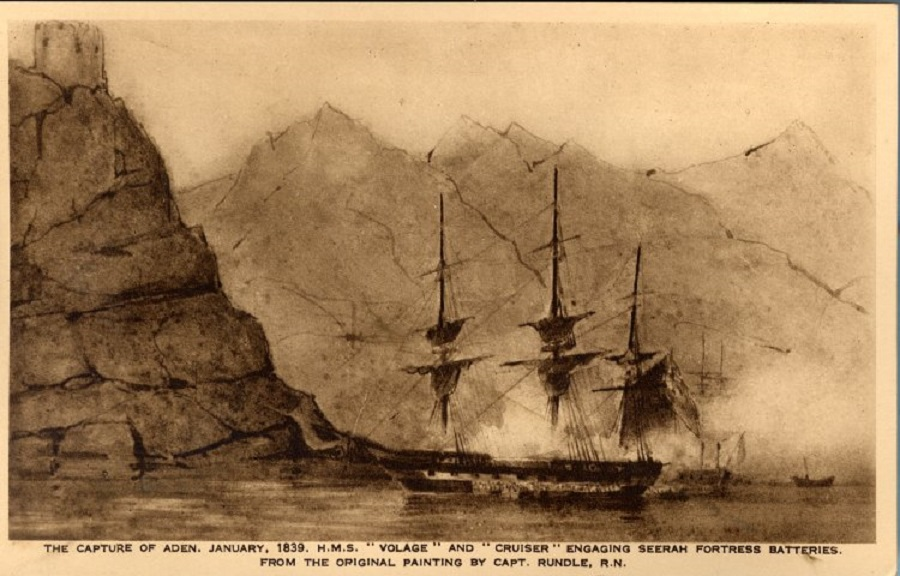
Capture of Aden 1839 HMS Volage and Cruiser engaging Seerah fortress batteries"

In 1839 Cruizer participated in the Aden Expedition along with the frigate HMS Volage and the two British East India Company (EIC) vessels, the sloop HCS Coote and the schooner HCS Mahi.

=== Service in China ===
Cruizer saw extensive service during the First Opium War. She participated in the Battle of Whampoa, the Second Battle of Chuenpi, the Battle of Canton, the Battle of Amoy, and the Battle of First Bar. During the Battle of Whampoa, Major General Hugh Gough, commander of the British Army during the First Opium War, personally directed the land assault on Whampoa island from Cruizer's deck.

The transport Indian Oak was wrecked on 14 August 1840 about 10 miles north of Napakiang (Naha) at Great Loochow Island (Okinawa). The Okinawans built a junk for the crew and passengers from Indian Oak that was given the name Loochoo. Cruizer and HMS Nimrod arrived on 16 September. Cruizer sailed shortly thereafter. Nimrod and Loochoo, which was carrying the people from Indian Oak, sailed on 28 September and arrived at Chusan on 5 October.

In January 1841, Cruizer recaptured the whaling brig Pilot. The local inhabitants in the Nicobar Islands had captured Pilot in December 1840 and murdered most of her crew. Pilot was taken into Singapore. (Note: Pilot had been on her fourth whaling voyage. She returned to England in September 1841 and thereafter made a fifth whaling voyage.)

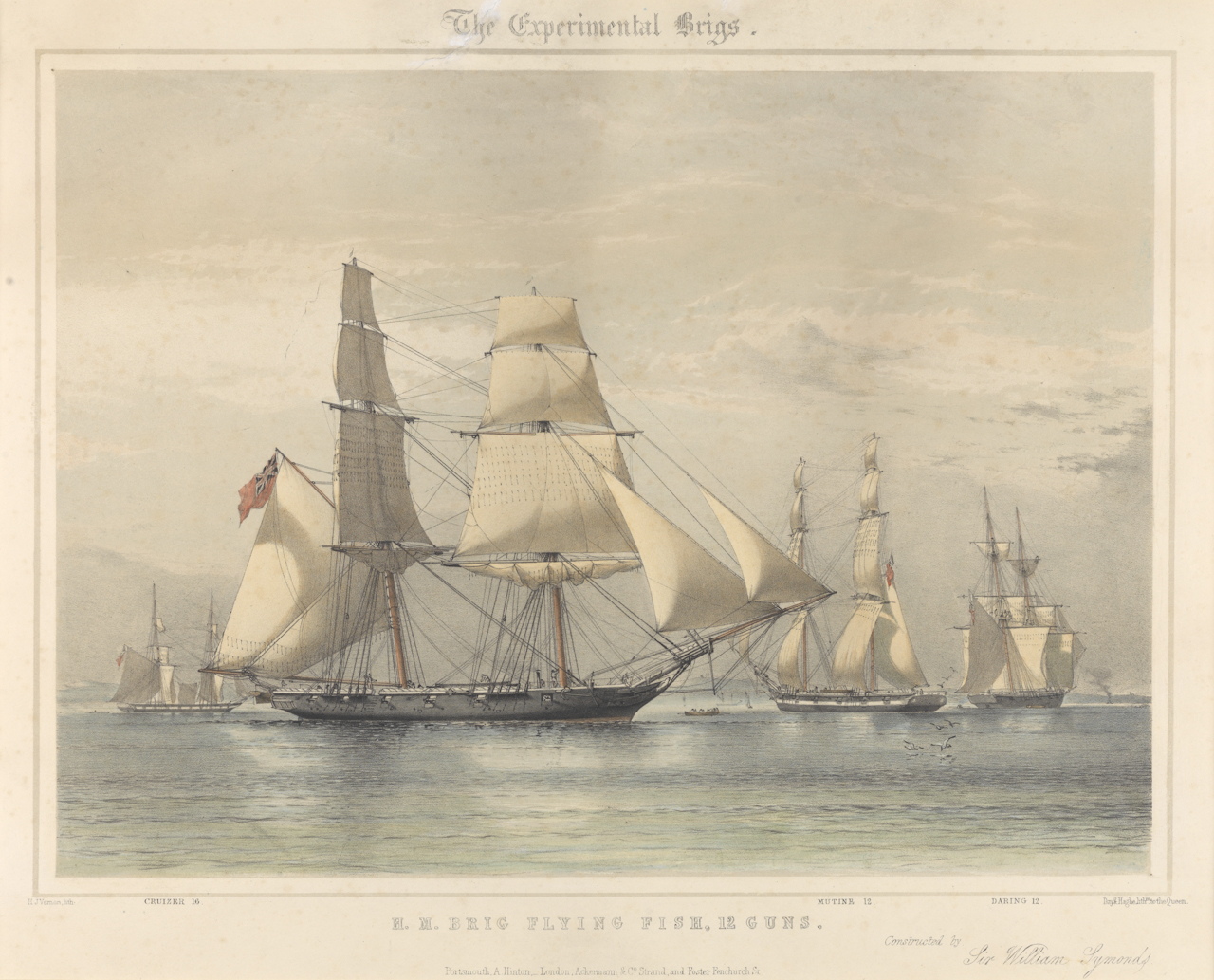
The Experimental Brig squadron of 1844- Cruizer is on the far left of the picture
