= HCS Mahi (1834) =

East India Company ship

History

East India Company
- Name: HCS Mahi
- Builder: Bombay Dockyard
- Launched: 27 March 1834

General characteristics
- Type: schooner
- Tons burthen: 157 (bm)
- Crew: 50
- Armament: 1834:1 × 32-pounder gun on a pivot mount + 2 × 12-pounder howitzers; Later:1 × 32-pounder gun on a pivot mount + 4 × 12-pounder carronades.

HCS Mahi (or Mahé) was a schooner that the Bombay Dockyard launched in 1834 for the British East India Company (EIC).

Mahi participated in the 1839 Aden Expedition along with the frigate HMS Volage, the sloop HCS Coote, and the sloop HMS Cruizer. The British attack began on 19 February and Mahé, under the command of Lieutenant Daniels, provided fire support. She sustained the only naval casualty of the expedition when Midshipman Nesbitt sustained a wound.

On 7 April 1855 Mahi, Lieutenant W.S. King, IN, commanding, delivered to Berbera Sir Richard F. Burton and his expedition to discover the source of the Nile. An attack by Somali warriors outside Berbera wounded Burton, killed one of the British officers on the expedition, and forced the cancellation of the expedition. (King died at sea on 24 November 1855.)

On 27 June 1856 Mahi, Lieutenant Walker, commanding, was at Massawa, investigating the slave trade across the Red Sea to Jeddah, Hodeida, etc.

On 13 January 1857 Mahi took a party of sappers and miners to Perim to establish a British military outpost there. The move was to forestall the French navy brig Nissus from claiming the island for France.

== Fate ==
After her release from official service, Mahé became a country ship trading on the Malabar Coast. She was still trading in 1870.

== Note ==
Charles Rathbone Low, the author of the history in the references below, was a midshipman on Mahi in 1855.
