= Alfred Dundas Taylor =

British marine surveyor

Alfred Dundas Taylor (1825–1898) was head of the Marine Survey Department of the Admiralty of the United Kingdom.

== Life ==
He was born on 30 August 1825 in England, son of George Ledwell Taylor (1788–1873), who worked as an architect to the Admiralty. He is stated to have first proposed the Sethusamudram Shipping Canal Project, in about 1860, later proposed in 1955 and not begun until 1995.

Taylor served on the East India Company ship Elphinstone as a midshipman until June 1843 when he was recommended to be made an officer. The following year he served in the brig Taptee under Commander Montriou where he surveyed the Concan coast off the coast of Mumbai, India. He was promoted to lieutenant in 1847 and served the next two years on the Feroze in the Red Sea. In 1850 he was appointed to command the survey ship Pownah where for six years he surveyed the Gulf of Cutch on the Malabar Coast. In 1855 he examined the port of Karwar, and then spent four years surveying Coringa Bay and Kakinada port on the Coromandel Coast and Cochin on the Malabar coast, surveying as far south as Calicut. In 1859 he piloted the expeditionary force against Wagher rebels involved in the Indian Rebellion of 1857-1859 at Bet Dwarka. In 1862, the Indian Navy was abolished and Taylor was pensioned off.

Taylor became interested in improving the hydrography of Indian waters. He was able to convince the Secretary of State of the Government of India to form the Marine Survey Department in 1875, with Taylor as its head. The department was productive during this period, producing many publications to aid in navigation, especially marine charts. Taylor retired on 1 July 1882 under the 55-year rule, succeeded by Commander L. S. Dawson.

Taylor died on 14 November 1898 in Sussex, England.

== Works ==
At the request of Admiral Washington, Taylor was employed in compiling Sailing Directions for the West Coast of Hindostan, published in 1865.

Taylor's last published book was The India Directory for the Guidance of Steamers and Sailing Vessels (London: Smith Elder, 1891).

== Family ==
Alfred was married to Bessie Mills and had a child, Alfred Mills Taylor, the only child mentioned in his will.

== Sources ==
- Black, Charles Edward Drummond. A Memoir on the Indian Surveys, 1875–1890. E.A. Arnold, 1891.
