= HMS Thunder (1718) =

History

United Kingdom
- Name: HMS Thunder
- Launched: 1718
- Acquired: 1718
- Commissioned: 1719
- Decommissioned: 27 March 1734
- In service: 1695
- Out of service: 1734
- Captured: October 1718
- Fate: Broken up, Deptford Dockyard

General characteristics
- Class & type: 13-gun bomb vessel
- Tons burthen: 253 68/94 (bm)
- Length: 82 ft 0 in (25.0 m) (gundeck); 63 ft 5 in (19.3 m) (keel)
- Beam: 27 ft 5 in (8.4 m)
- Depth of hold: 10 ft 7 in (3.2 m)
- Propulsion: Sail
- Sail plan: Ketch-rigged
- Complement: 40
- Armament: 6 × 6-pdrs; 6 × 1/2-pdr swivels; 1 × 13 1/2 in mortar

HMS Thunder was a 13-gun bomb vessel, used by the Royal Navy for cruising and land bombardment duties between 1719 and 1734. Constructed for the Spanish Navy, she was captured by the British in 1718 and recommissioned for Mediterranean service, including as part of Admiral Charles Wager's fleet. Despite extensive repairs she was eventually declared unseaworthy, and was broken up at Deptford Dockyard in 1734.

== Bibliography ==
- Winfield, Rif (2007). British Warships of the Age of Sail 1714–1792: Design, Construction, Careers and Fates. Seaforth. ISBN 9781844157006.
