= HMS Sinbad =

History

United Kingdom
- Name: Sinbad
- Builder: Pembroke Dockyard
- Laid down: November 1832
- Launched: 27 February 1834
- Completed: 30 June 1834
- Renamed: As MV.2, 19 October 1855; As YC.3, 3 July 1856
- Reclassified: As bomb vessel, June 1855; As lighter, October 1856
- Fate: Broken up, November 1866

General characteristics (as built)
- Type: 60-foot (18.3 m) lighter
- Tons burthen: 105 bm
- Length: 60 ft 1 in (18.3 m) (upper deck); 47 ft 6 in (14.5 m) (keel)
- Beam: 20 ft 9 in (6.3 m)
- Draught: 5 ft (1.5 m)
- Depth: 9 ft (2.7 m)
- Armament: None

HMS Sinbad was a 60-foot (18.3 m) lighter built for the Royal Navy during the 1830s. She was converted into a bomb vessel during the Crimean War of 1854–55 and converted back into a lighter after the war. The ship was broken up in 1866.

== Description ==
Sinbad had a length at the upper deck of 60 feet 1 inch (18.3 m) and 47 feet 6 inches (14.5 m) at the keel. She had a beam of 20 feet 9 inches (6.3 m), a draught of about 5 feet (1.5 m) and a depth of hold of 9 feet (2.7 m). The ship's tonnage was 105 tons burthen.

When converted into bomb vessels, the 60-foot lighters were armed with a single 13-inch (330 mm) mortar and had a complement of 17–18 crewmen.

== Construction and career ==
Sinbad, the only ship of her name to serve in the Royal Navy, was laid down in November 1832 at Pembroke Dockyard, Wales, and launched on 27 February 1823. She was completed on 30 June 1834 at Plymouth Dockyard. Her conversion into a bomb vessel began in October 1854 at Woolwich Dockyard and lasted until June 1855. The ship was renamed MV.2 (Mortar Vessel) in recognition of her new role on 19 October 1855.
