= Mount Elephant (homestead) =

Historic homestead in Victoria, Australia

- Mount Elephant Homestead

- Location in Corangamite Shire, Victoria
- 37°55′22″S 143°11′39″E
- Type: Homestead, associated built facilities and grounds
- Location: Derrinallum, Victoria, Australia
- Nearest city: Colac

History
- Built: ~1844–1854 (original homestead)
- Built for: John Brown

Mount Elephant is a historic pastoral estate and homestead near Derrinallum in the Western District of Victoria, Australia. Established in the 1840s, the property was associated with several prominent pastoral families, including the Chirnsides, Curries and Fairbairns. The estate contains historic agricultural buildings, including a bluestone stable dating from the 1860s. Portions of the property were acquired for soldier settlement following the First World War. Mount Elephant later became the residence of aviator and federal politician James Fairbairn, who purchased the property in 1924. The estate has continued to be used for agricultural purposes.

== History ==
Mount Elephant originated as a pastoral holding of John Brown, who settled in the region as early as 1840. By 1855, the estate became acquired by the brothers Thomas and Andrew Chirnside, who went on to maintain substantial pastoral interests throughout western Victoria. Surviving early structures include rooms believed to date from approximately 1844–1854, possibly forming part of the original homestead, and bluestone stables constructed around 1860–1867, with the stables being built from roughly coursed stone. Following Andrew Chirnside's death in 1890, the property was owned by his son, Andrew Spence Chirnside.

In 1899, brothers Edwin and Henry Alan Currie, sons of pastoralist John Lang Currie, acquired an interest in Mount Elephant, having inherited portions of the family's Gala estate following their father's death in 1898. Around 1900, the brothers purchased approximately 17,000 acres (6,900 ha) from the southern part of Andrew Spence Chirnside's Mount Elephant run, including the homestead beside Lake Logan. The acquisition expanded their pastoral operations, which included sheep and cattle breeding. Their partnership ended in 1901, with Edwin assuming sole ownership of Gala and Alan continuing at Mount Elephant.

The woolshed

The original entrance, and other buildings

Under Alan Currie's management, Mount Elephant became an important pastoral station with breeding programmes involving merino sheep, Shorthorn cattle and thoroughbred horses. Currie also became active in local affairs, serving on the Shire of Hampden council between 1906 and 1914, including terms as shire president in 1909 and 1911. During the First World War, he served with the Royal Field Artillery in France and Belgium and was awarded the Military Cross in January 1918.

Following the First World War, portions of Mount Elephant were subdivided for the settlement of returned servicemen. In December 1920, the Victorian Closer Settlement Board purchased the remaining portion of the estate from Major Alan Currie for soldier settlement purposes. Currie subsequently acquired the Ercildoune estate near Ballarat, where he continued his pastoral and livestock-breeding interest.

The former Mount Elephant homestead property was subsequently offered for sale by the Settlement Board, and in March 1921, the board advertised a public sale to be held at the Mechanics' Institute in Derrinallum on 14 March. The homestead property was again advertised in September 1922, when the government sought tenders for the purchase of Crown land in fee simple.

In 1924, Mount Elephant was purchased by James Valentine Fairbairn, a former Royal Flying Corps pilot who had served during the First World War. Fairbairn established a grazing enterprise on the property, initially carrying approximately 3,000 sheep. By 1934, the estate carried approximately 10,000 sheep and 350 cattle. Fairbairn also experimented with crossing Southdown and Corriedale sheep to improve livestock production.

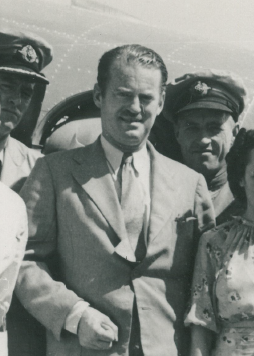
James Fairbairn

Daisy Fairbairn (née Kemble)

A keen aviator, Fairbairn constructed a private airstrip at Mount Elephant and regularly used aircraft to travel between the property and Melbourne. In 1931, he acquired a De Havilland DH.60 Moth, which he crash-landed near near Camperdown the following year. Fairbairn also became increasingly involved in politics, serving briefly on the Hampden Shire Council before being allected to the Victorian Legislative Assembly in 1932. In 1933, he entered federal politics as the United Australia Party member for Flinders, frequently travelling by air between Mount Elephant and Canberra.

In October 1937, severe rain and cold weather caused substantial livestock losses at Mount Elephant. Fairbairn, who had been away from the property, returned to discover that approximately 100 ewes and 200 lambs had died during the adverse conditions.

Fairbairn continued to reside at Mount Elephant while serving in federal parliament and subsequently as Minister for Air and Minister for Civil Aviation in the government of Robert Menzies. On 13 August 1940, he was killed in the 1940 Canberra air disaster, when a Royal Australian Air Force aircraft crashed near Canberra Airport, killing all 10 people on board. Among the other passengers were two federal ministers and the Chief of the General Staff. Fairbairn was survived by his wife, Daisy Olive, and their two children, Geoffrey and Angela.

Geoffrey, Anne and Katrina Fairbairn aboard the Oronsay, not long after their road accident, 1953.

Following Fairbairn's death, Mount Elephant remained in his family, and by 1952, his son Geoffrey Forrester Fairbairn and his wife Anne were in ownership. On 28 April 1953, the couple and their 6-year-old daughter Katrina were injured in a road accident near Footscray when the ute they were travelling in collided with a truck. The family had been travelling to Melbourne to board the ocean liner SS Oronsay for a voyage timed with the coronation of Elizabeth II. All 5 occupants of the ute were injured, but no fatalities occurred.

The estate subsequently passed through further changes of ownership, and by the early 2000s, Mount Elephant was owend by Anthony Baillieu, a member of the prominent Victorian Baillieu family. In early 2010, the property was sold to Swedish count Carl Gustav Wachmeister for approximately $20 million. At the time of sale, the estate comprised 3,310 hectares (8,180 acres).

== See also ==
- All Saints' Anglican Church, Derrinallum
- Geelong Grammar School
- Gala
- Ettrick
- Larra
- Yalla-Y-Poora
- Stony Point
