= Coomete =

Historic homestead in Victoria, Australia

- Coomete Homestead

- Location in Moyne Shire, Victoria
- 38°03′28″S 142°34′17″E
- Type: Homestead, associated built facilities and grounds
- Location: Minjah, Victoria, Australia
- Nearest city: Warrnambool

History
- Built: 1860s
- Built for: William Bayles

Site notes
- Architectural style: Victorian

Coomete is a historic pastoral property near Hexham, in the Western District of Victoria, Australia. Established during the 1860s, the estate has been under the ownership of the Bayles family and their descendants ever since. Historically used for sheep and cattle grazing, the property became known for its breeding of Corriedale sheep and Aberdeen Angus cattle. Portions of Coomete were acquired for soldier settlement following the Second World War, while the remaining estate continued under family ownership. From the early 2000s onwards, the property has been operated by the Roxburgh family, who diversified its agricultural activities to include commercial livestock production and cropping.

== History ==
Coomete was established during the early 1860s, when the property was acquired by William Bayles, a businessman based in Melbourne and politician with extensive interests in the Western District. Bayles, who had previously run a shipping business, was elected to the Melbourne City Council in 1861 and served as Mayor of Melbourne from 1865 to 1866. He also represented Villiers and Heytesbury in the Victorian Legislative Assembly between 1864 and 1880, briefly serving as Commissioner of Trade and Customs in 1868. Although Coomete remained in his ownership, the property was initially operated by tenant pastoralists.

William Bayles

By 1864, Coomete was occupied by pastoralist Augustus Bostock, originally residing in the Warrnambool area. Bostock leased the estate from Bayles and established a sheep-grazing operation. On 6 July 1865, he married Margaret Aitken at Coomete, where the couple went on to raise several children. During his occupation, he undertook the breeding of longwool sheep, and its wool was marketed as far afield as London.

In August 1871, Bostock was appointed the inaugural honorary secretary of the Hexham Long Woolled Sheep Association (later renamed the Long-Woolled Sheep Association of Victoria). Bostock was frequently invited to judge livestock at agricultural exhibitions, including events held at Ballarat and Hamilton.

After around 30 years at Coomete, Bostock retired from pastoralism in December 1894. The property was then advertised for lease, with terms ranging from 3 to 5 years. At the time, Coomete comprised 7,478 acres (3,026 ha), divided into 13 paddocks, and contained a bluestone homestead, woolshed, stables and other agricultural buildings. On 21 December 1894, Bostock conducted a clearing sale at which 12,000 sheep, 30 cattle, 10 horses and various items of station equipment were offered for sale.

By June 1897, the estate had been leased to John McDonald. During his tenure the property was stocked with 12,000 sheep, 200 cattle and 25 horses. McDonald held a clearing sale in 1898. Following the conclusion of his tenancy, Coomete returned to the direct management of the Bayles family.

By 1899, Walter Melville Bayles, the son of William Bayles, had taken up the lease of Coomete from his father. Two of his daughters were born at Coomete in 1904 and 1905. Following his father's death in October 1903, Walter inherited the estate and continued its pastoral operations. In December 1905, he sought tenders for extensive alterations and improvements to the homestead.

Another view of the homestead

During Walter's ownership, he diversified the agricultural activities of the estate, establishing a poultry-breeding enterprise specialising in White Leghorn chickens, in addition to sheep and cattle grazing. By 1916, the property accommodated nearly 2,000 birds in purpose-built facilities, including several large poultry sheds and adjoining runs.

In late 1913, a governess was sought after to provide instruction in music, French conversation and general subjects to 3 girls residing at the property. By 1916, the family had temporarily relocated to South Yarra to facilitate their children's education, while Thomas Warburton assumed responsibility for managing the estate.

Although Walter Melville Bayles maintained a residence in Melbourne, he continued to hold Coomete until his death on 3 June 1948, aged 85, following a short illness.

In October 1949, the Australian Minister for Post-War Reconstruction, John Dedman, announced that 6,278 acres (2,540 ha) of the Coomete estate had been approved for inclusion in the War Service Land Settlement Scheme. The land comprised two sections, including 5,469 acres (2,213 ha) near Mortlake and a smaller area near Koroit. Following Walter Bayles' death, the Victorian Soldier Settlement Commission acquired a substantial portion of the estate from his deceased estate for subdivision into farms for returned servicemen.

The Coomete soldier-settlement land was initially divided into 9 allotments, and increased to 11. The proposed farms generally ranged from 580 to 665 acres (235 to 269 ha) and were considered suitable for sheep grazing and mixed agriculture. Applications from eligible returned servicemen were invited during November 1949, with a closing date of 5 December. Infrastructure works were undertaken before the properties were occupied, including the construciton of 3 miles (4.8 km) of fencing and 10 timber houses designed by the architecutral firm Buchan, Laird and Buchan.

The settlement allotments began to be occupied during the early 1950s, with temporary leases issued to returned servicemen. Among the original settlers included J. J. McCarthy, A. F. Gordon and H. M. Gilbert, who took up allotments 4, 5 and 6 respectively. Further improvements were made to roads, fencing and water supplies, while the Warrnambool Shire Council undertook roadworks within the settlement area.

The property was among the early Western District adopters of the Aberdeen Angus cattle breed and had maintained membership of Angus Australia for approximately 75 years by 2015. Until the 1990s, the estate operated a registered Angus breed herd of 400 cows.

By the early 21st century, Coomete was operated by Jack Roxburgh, a fifth-generation descendant of the Bayles family, together with his wife Jenny. The couple assumed direct responsibility for its agricultural operations, following an extended period in which the estate had been managed by employees and tenant farmers. They expanded the property's activities beyond traditional sheep and cattle grazing to include broadacre cropping and modern pasture management. As of 2015, Coomete comprised 1,600 hectares (4,000 acres), with a further 400 ha (990 acres) of farmland operated 30 minutes to the south-west. It carried 500 Angus breeding cows and 6,000 composite crossbred ewes, with the latter incorporating Coopworth, East Friesian and Finnsheep bloodlines. The cattle enterprise was in association with the Team Te Mania breeding programme.

== See also ==
- Merrang
- Brie Brie
- Ettrick
- Gala
- Poligolet
