= Poligolet =

Historic homestead in Victoria, Australia

- Poligolet Homestead

- Location in Corangamite Shire, Victoria
- 37°59′14″S 143°08′17″E
- Type: Homestead, associated built facilities and grounds
- Location: Derrinallum, Victoria, Australia
- Nearest city: Colac

History
- Built: 1880
- Built for: Thomas Dodds

Site notes
- Architectural style: Victorian Gothic

Poligolet is a historic pastoral property and homestead near Derrinallum, in the Western District of Victoria, Australia. Originally part of the larger Larra pastoral estate, the property was established as a separate holding during the nineteenth century and subsequently passed through several owners, including the Dodds and Maconochie families. Portions of the estate were acquired for soldier settlement following the First World War. The homestead is classified by the National Trust of Australia (Victoria).

== History ==
Poligolet originally formed part of the extensive pastoral holdings of John Lang Currie, who acquired Larra in 1844. In 1857, John Dodds purchased the land comprising Poligolet from Currie, establishing it as a separate estate. Following his father's death, Thomas Dodds, who had previously lived at Larra, moved to Poligolet. The property remained associated with the Dodds family until September 1889, when it was purchased and occupied by James Machonochie.

The homestead likely dates from around 1880. Stonemason George Gemmell, who was also involved in building projects elsewhere in the Camperdown district, was credited with construction work at Poligolet.

The rear of the house

On 3 July 1896, John Watts, a 29-year-old employee who had worked at Poligolet for approximately three years, died by suicide on the estate. Watts had been due to leave his employment following a discussion with James Maconochie the previous day. His body was discovered in Harney's paddock by fellow station worker Roderick McLennan, who had been carrying out his usual duties. Watts was survived by his wife and one child.

On 19 October 1904, Benjamin Sullivan, who had been employed at Poligolet since the beginning of the shearing season, was arrested and taken to the lock-up at Camperdown. His arrest concerned a time-payment arrangement for a bicycle purchased from the Davies-Franklin Depot in Port Fairy.

During the Machonochie family's ownership, Poligolet operated as a pastoral station, including sheep grazing and shearing activities. The property was affected by a substantial grass fire in early January 1908, which spread from Poligolet into the neighbouring Larra estate. Approximately 1,800 acres (730 ha) of land at Poligolet were burnt despite efforts to contain the fire. Another fire occurred in January 1914 after explosives used by fencing contractors ignited dry grass. On that occasion, the spread towards a metalled road, preventing more extensive damage to the surrounding pasture.

In 1918, more than 3,000 acres (1,200 ha) of the Poligolet estate were purchased for the settlement of returned soldiers following the First World War. The land was reportedly sold for £18 10s per acre.

The woolshed

The estate later came under the ownership of James Alexander Maconochie, who had inherited it following his father's death. Born in Camperdown, Maconochie died at Poligolet in 1932, aged 62. During the following decades, the property continued to operate as a pastoral station. William Rutherford Edgar served as its manager for approximately 12 years until his death on 15 August 1950.

On 28 November 1968, Poligolet Homestead was classified by the National Trust of Australia (Victoria). Since 2004, it has been owned by the McGavin family and has continued to be used for agricultural purposes, including livestock grazing and cropping.

== See also ==
- Larra
- Stony Point
- Gala
