= Gnarpurt =

Historic homestead in Victoria, Australia

- The shearers' quarters of Gnarpurt

- Location in Corangamite Shire, Victoria
- 38°01′13″S 143°21′34″E
- Type: Homestead, associated built facilities and grounds
- Location: Lismore, Victoria, Australia
- Nearest city: Colac

History
- Built: 1867 (chapel), 1880 (woolshed, shearers' quarters)
- Built for: Adam Swanston Robertson

Site notes
- Architect: Alexander Hamilton
- Architectural style: Victorian Gothic

Gnarpurt is a historic pastoral property and homestead complex near Lismore, in the Western District of Victoria, Australia. Established in the early 1840s, the estate was originally known as Little Corangamite or Kinloch Abbert before being renamed following its acquisition by the Manifold family in 1885. The property contains a bluestone homestead, an 1867 chapel, and a nineteenth-century woolshed and shearers' quarters. The chapel, measuring approximately 8 by 4.5 metres, is one of Victoria's smallest churches.

== History ==
Gnarpurt was established as a pastoral run in 1841 by Adam Swanston Robertson, initially in association with the Oliphant family. The property was originally known as Little Corangamite or Kinloch Abbert and formed part of the extensive pastoral holdings developed around Lake Corangamite during the early European settlement of the district. Robertson subsequently developed the station for sheep grazing, constructing a homestead and associated agricultural buildings.

Robertson undertook extensive improvements to the estate during the 1850s, including the planting of blue gum trees. A committed Presbyterian, he also incorporated a purpose-built chapel room into the homestead, where he conducted religious services as a lay preacher. The room was distinguished by its vaulted ceiling and substantial exposed beams, providing a dedicated place of worship before the construction of a separate church building.

In 1867, Robertson commissioned the construction of a small bluestone chapel near the homestead for the use of the station's employees. The building was designed in the Gothic Revival style, drawing upon Robertson's recollections of rural churches in Scotland. A carved Celtic motif was incorporated above the entrance. Measuring approximately 8 metres in length and 4.5 metres in width, the chapel has been reputed to be the smallest church in Victoria.

The chapel at Gnarpurt

Further improvements were undertaken in 1880, when architect and builder Alexander Hamilton was responsible for the construction of a bluestone woolshed and shearers' quarters. The large woolshed was capable of accommodating numerous shearers, and at its peak, the station reportedly processed approximately 15,000 merino sheep, with the woolshed containing as many as 20 shearing stands.

In 1885, the estate was purchased from Adam Swanston Robertson by members of the Manifold, who had extensive pastoral interests throughout the Western District. William Thomson Manifold initially reside at Gnarpurt with his wife Alice Mary Cridland, whom he married in August 1886. Their first child was born at the property. Following the division of the family's Purrumbete estate, William moved to the Purrumbete homestead, while Gnarpurt remained associated with the Manifolds.

During the late nineteenth and early twentieth centuries, Gnarpurt was managed for an extended period by Archibald Thomson, who was employed by James Chester Manifold. Thomson served as manager of the estate for approximately 38 years, overseeing its pastoral operations. He died in September 1932, aged 71.

In January 1908, negotiations between James Chester Manifold and the Victorian Closer Settlement Board concerning the purchase of approximately 16,000 acres (6,500 ha) of Gnarpurt were reported to have broken down. The board had been considering the land for subdivision into smaller agricultural holdings, but its extended period for reaching a decision expired on 31 December 1907 without an agreement. Manifold subsequently entered negotiations with neighbouring landowners who were interested in enlarging their existing properties.

The homestead

The woolshed

On 18 January 1908, a severe thunderstorm south of Lismore caused 6 separate grass fires, five of which occurred on the Gnarpurt estate. Lightning ignited the dry vegetation at several locations in quick succession, threatening to spread across the surrounding grazing land. The first outbreak was noticed near the homestead at approximately 7:30 pm and burnt around 30 acres (12 ha) before being extinguished. Station workers, directed by overseer Mr Longmore, then travelled towards Foxhow to contain another fire, where they received assistance from local workers. Other outbreaks occurred further north towards Ettrick homestead. Despite the number of fires and limited manpower, approximately 500 acres (200 ha) were burnt across Gnarpurt before the flames were brought under control.

Further subdivision of the estate occurred in April 1910, when approximately 8,300 acres (3,400 ha) were offered for sale on behalf of James Chester Manifold. The auction was conducted jointly by Dalgety and Co., Thomas Baker, and Strachan, Murray and Shannon. Of the land offered, approximately 6,845 acres (2,770 ha) were sold, achieving an average price of slightly more than £7 per acre.

During the 1920s, Gnarpurt became the residence of Thomas Chester Manifold, the son of James Chester Manifold. Following his return from overseas military service and university studies, Manifold married Agnes Gwendolen Grimwade in May 1923, and the couple settled at Gnarpurt. While residing at the property, he became involved in local government and was elected to the Shire of Hampden council in 1926. The Manifold family remained at Gnarpurt until 1936, when they moved to Talindert.

On 9 December 1926, a fire caused extensive damage to the station's agricultural buildings and equipment. The outbreak reportedly began when smouldering sawdust ignited material near a stack, with strong north-westerly winds rapidly spreading the flames. A machinery shed was destroyed, together with approximately 40 tons of hay, 30 tons of firewood, two wagons and a considerable quantity of agricultural equipment. The losses were estimated at several hundred pounds.

By 1939, Tom Backwell occupied the property, and by 1954, Kenneth Whitehead was recorded as residing in the estate. The Leighton family were identified as residents in July 1964.

During the mid-1960s, grazier Charles Sutherland Laidlaw and his family moved to Gnarpurt from the Willaura district. Laidlaw subsequently became involved in several community organisations, including the Lismore Presbyterian Church, the local fire brigade and the Geelong College Council, on which he served between 1974 and 1985, and was later named the Shire of Hampden's Citizen of the Year in 1991.

== See also ==
- Ettrick
- Larra
- Gala
- Purrumbete
