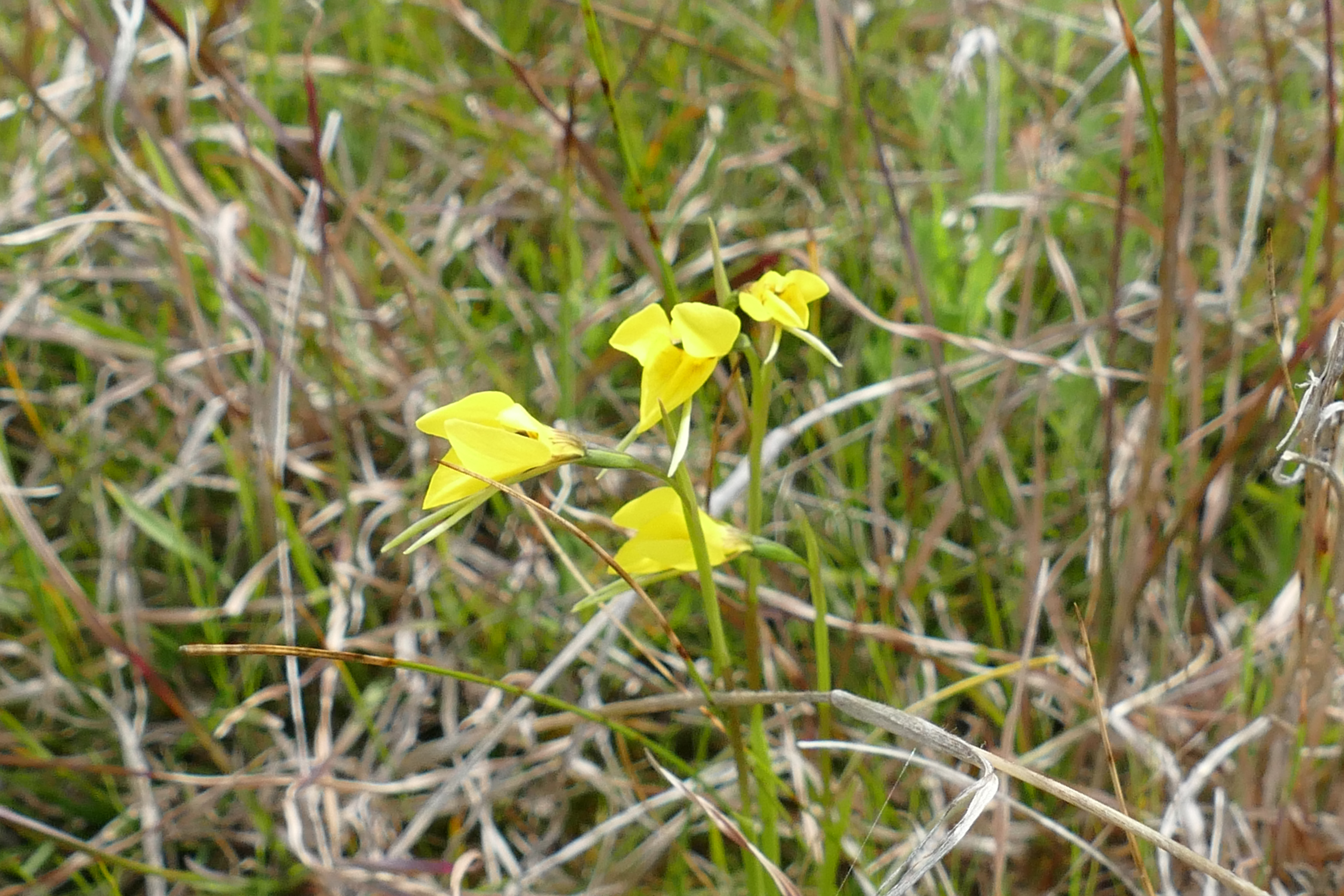
- In the southern Grampians

Scientific classification
- Kingdom: Plantae
- Clade: Embryophytes
- Clade: Tracheophytes
- Clade: Angiosperms
- Clade: Monocots
- Order: Asparagales
- Family: Orchidaceae
- Subfamily: Orchidoideae
- Tribe: Diurideae
- Genus: Diuris
- Species: D. gregaria

Binomial name
- Diuris gregaria D.L.Jones

= Diuris gregaria =

Clumping golden moths

Species of orchid

Diuris gregaria, commonly known as clumping golden moths is a species of orchid that is endemic to Victoria. It between three and seven leaves and one or two bright yellow flowers with a few dark striations and usually grows in dense tufts of up to thirty plants. It is a rare species mostly only found in grassland west of Melbourne.

== Description ==
Diuris gregaria is a tuberous, perennial herb which often grows in densely crowded tufts of up to thirty plants. Each has between three and seven narrow linear leaves 50–100 mm (2–4 in) long and 1–2 mm (0.04–0.08 in) wide in a loose tussock. One or two bright yellow flowers with a few short, dark striations, 12–20 mm (0.5–0.8 in) wide are borne on a flowering stem 100–200 mm (4–8 in) tall. The dorsal is egg-shaped and held close to horizontally, 7–12 mm (0.3–0.5 in) long and 4–8 mm (0.2–0.3 in) wide. The lateral sepals are green, lance-shaped with the narrower end towards the base, 14–18 mm (0.6–0.7 in) long, about 2 mm (0.08 in) wide, turned below horizontal and usually parallel to each other. The petals curve forwards, elliptic to egg-shaped, 8–12 mm (0.3–0.5 in) long and 4–6 mm (0.16–0.24 in) wide on a green stalk 3–4 mm (0.1–0.2 in) long. The labellum is 10–17 mm (0.4–0.7 in) long and has three lobes. The centre lobe is egg-shaped, 7–12 mm (0.3–0.5 in) long and 6–10 mm (0.2–0.4 in) wide and the side lobes are oblong to wedge-shaped, 2–3 mm (0.08–0.1 in) long and about 1 mm (0.04 in) wide with irregular edges. There are two dark yellow, pimply callus ridges near the mid-line of the labellum. Flowering occurs in September and October.

== Taxonomy and naming ==
Diuris gregaria was first formally described in 2006 by David Jones from a specimen collected near Derrinallum and the description was published in Australian Orchid Research. The specific epithet (gregaria) is a Latin word meaning "pertaining to a flock or herd", referring to the clumping habit of this species.

== Distribution and habitat ==
Clumping golden moths grows in grassland on the basalt plains in western Victoria.

== Conservation ==
This orchid is classed as "endangered" under the Victorian government Flora and Fauna Guarantee Act 1988. Its range has been reduced by farming and agriculture.
