= Stony Point (homestead) =

Historic homestead in Victoria, Australia

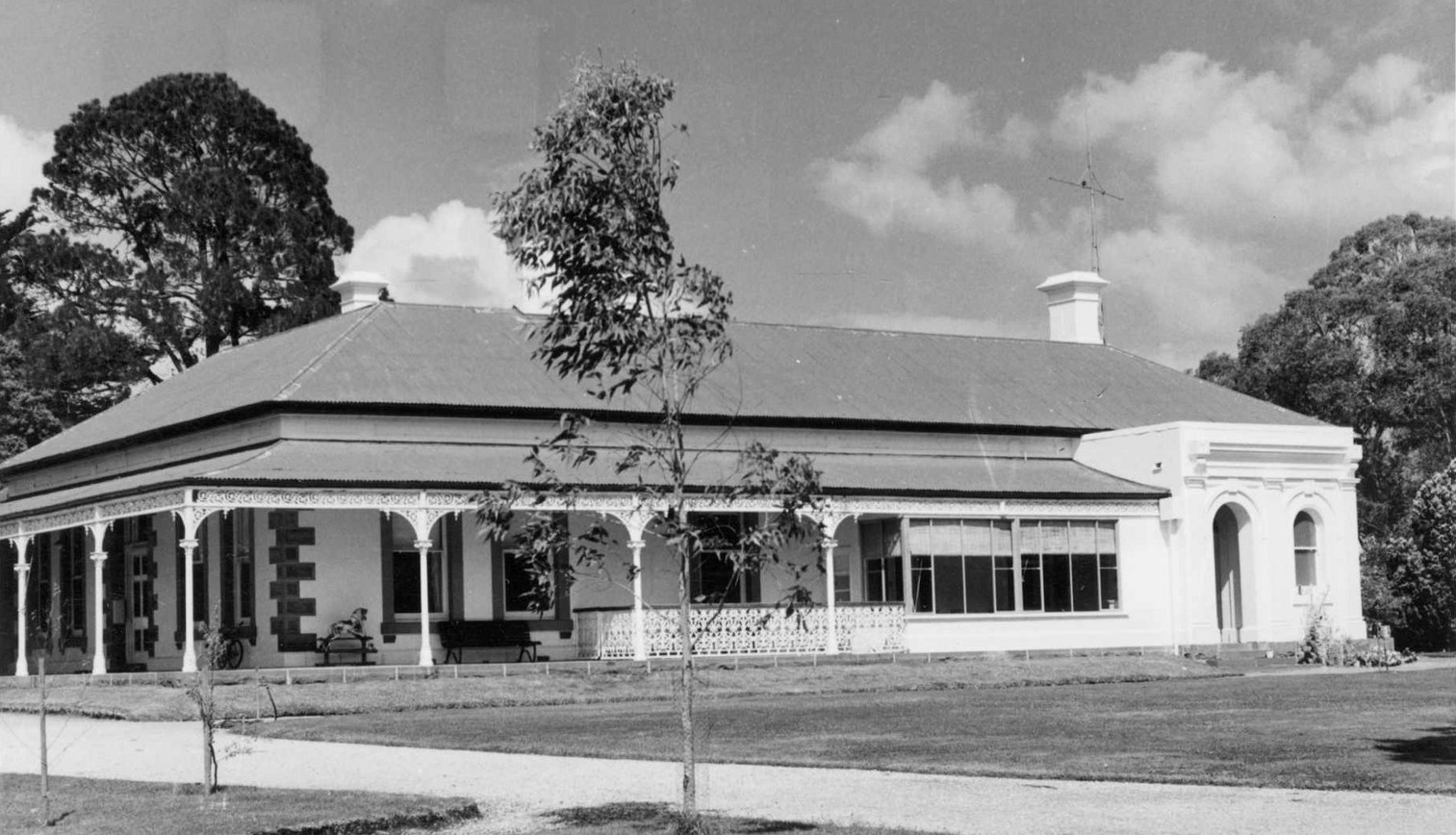
- Stony Point Homestead

- Location in Moyne Shire, Victoria
- 38°01′54″S 143°01′51″E
- Type: Homestead, associated built facilities and grounds
- Location: Darlington, Victoria, Australia
- Nearest city: Colac

History
- Built: 1856 (original homestead), 1870s (later additions)
- Built for: John Cumming

Site notes
- Architect: Andrew Keer
- Architectural style: Italianate

Stony Point is a historic pastoral homestead and sheep station near Darlington, Victoria, Australia. Established as a pastoral run in the 1840s, the property became one of the notable sheep stations of Victoria's Western District. The present homestead incorporates an earlier 1856 stone residence and later 1870s Italianate additions. Since its purchase by Robert Jamieson in 1881, Stony Point has remained in continuous ownership of the Jamieson family for multiple generations and continues to operate as a grazing property.

== History ==
The Stony Point pastoral run was first taken up by Matthew Hall in 1844. In 1849 it was acquired by Scottish pioneer John Cumming, who had previously established breweries in Melbourne and Geelong. Cumming erected a four-room stone house with a verandah and kitchen wing in 1851, forming the nucleus of the present homestead. During the 1870s, his son Thomas Forrest Cumming was given ownership and added substantial extensions, possibly to the design of local architect Andrew Keer, creating the larger Italianate residence that survives today.

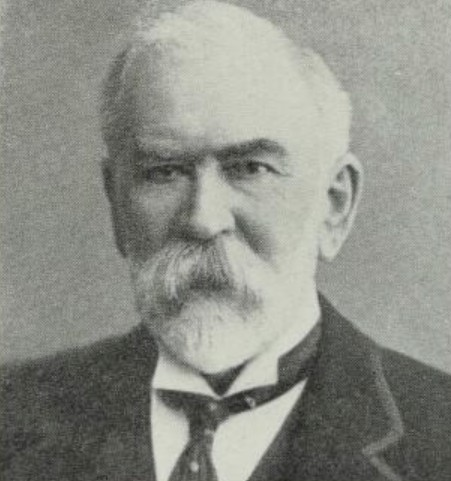
Thomas Forrest Cumming

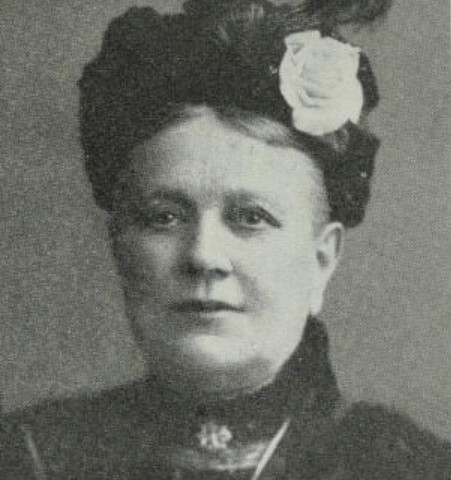
Ann Cumming

=== Jamieson ownership ===
Robert Jamieson, born in Scotland in 1812, emigrated to the Port Phillip District in 1841 after a difficult six-month voyage from Greenock aboard the SS John Cooper. After joining his younger brother William Jamieson, the brothers purchased stock and moved west to work on pastoral runs near Warrnambool. They later established the Castlemaddie run near Portland, where they grazed sheep, made cheese and traded through the Henty family.

After selling Castlemaddie in 1849, the Jamieson brothers briefly operated a flour mill at Fyansford on the Barwon River. The venture proved unsuccessful, and in 1851 they returned to pastoral pursuits by purchasing the Eumerella West run on the Eumerella River. Robert eventually became sole owner of Eumerella West after William sold his share and pursued unsuccessful pastoral ventures in New Zealand.

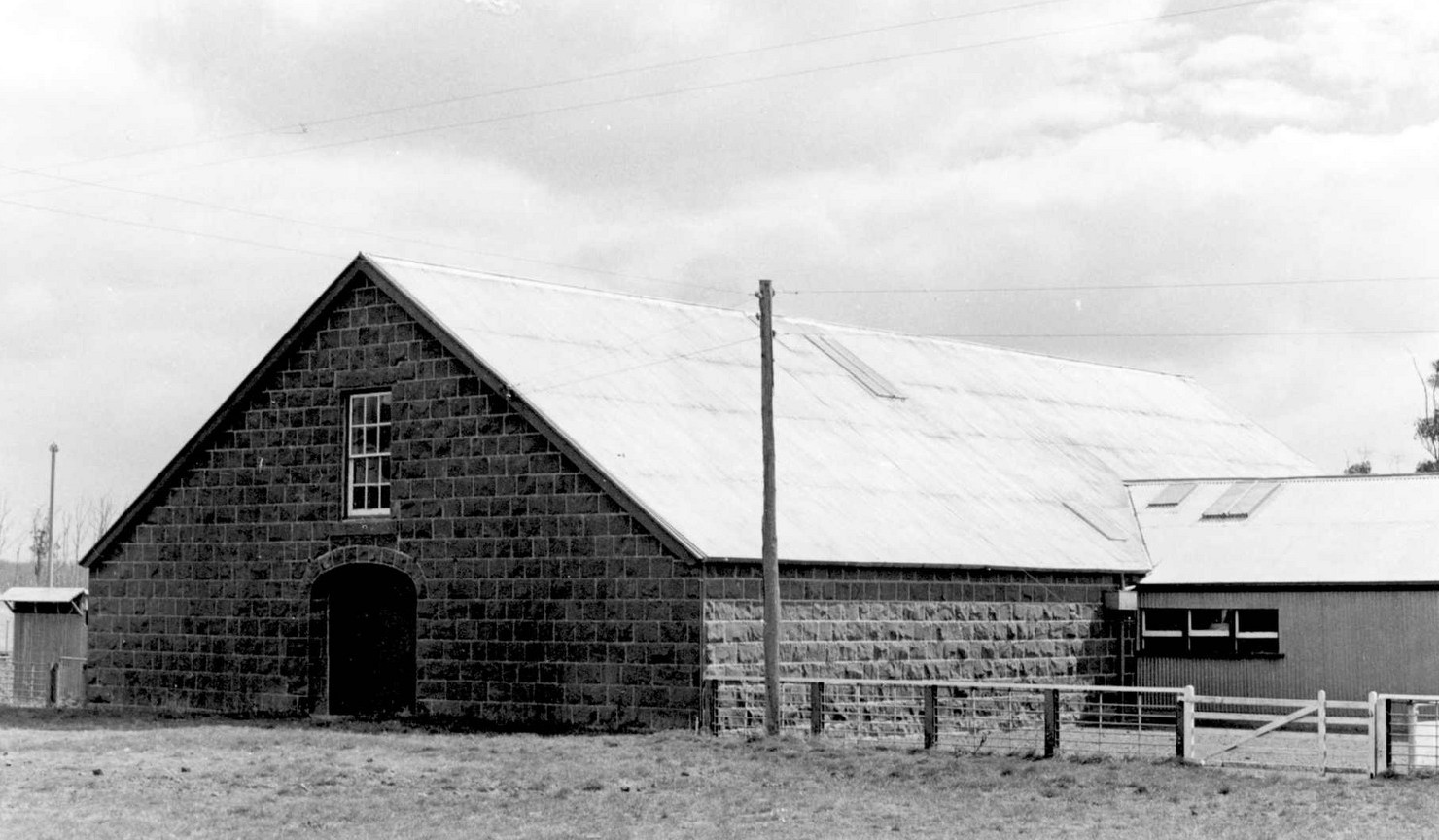
The woolshed

Robert Jamieson prospered as a pastoralist and in 1857 sold Eumerella West for £9,000, including 1,400 cattle. He then acquired the Bolac Plains station east of Chatsworth, where he consolidated a substantial pastoral holding despite complications arising from the Duffy Land Act and associated land speculation.

In 1881 Robert Jamieson purchased Stony Point from Thomas Forrest Cumming for £5 10s per acre. The property comprised approximately 4,946 acres (2,001 ha) on Mount Emu Creek near Darlington. Jamieson's initial offer of £10,000 for all stock was rejected, and he subsequently purchased selected sheep separately, including 179 rams and 826 ewes. Robert Jamieson and his family then moved into the homestead.

The Jamieson family quickly established Stony Point as an important social and pastoral centre in the district. In April 1886 a large ball was held in the woolshed to celebrate the marriage of a Jamieson daughter. The woolshed was decorated with Chinese lanterns and attended by approximately 150 guests from surrounding districts including Camperdown, Lismore, Mortlake, Hexham and Woorndoo.

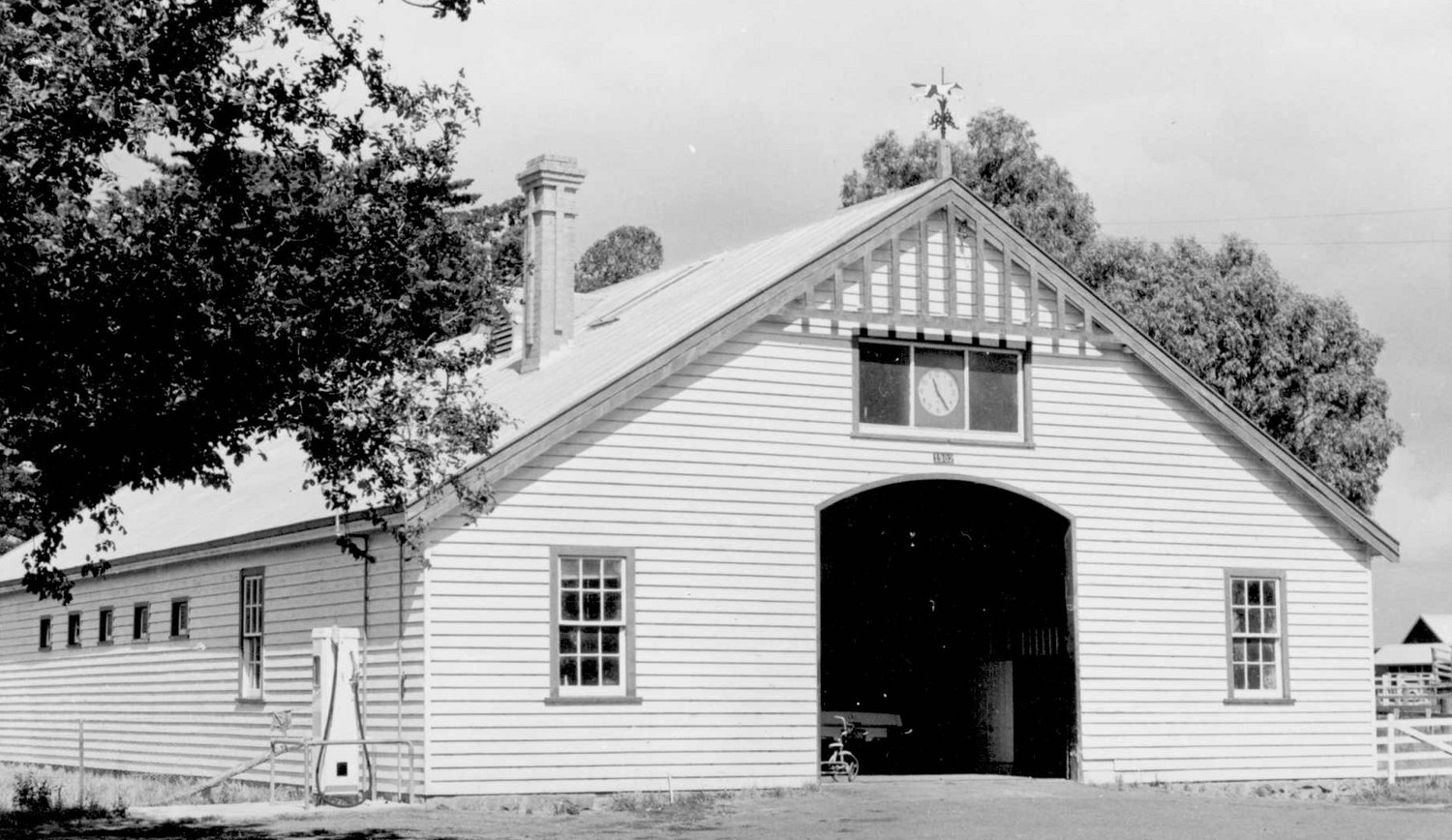
The coach house

Robert Jamieson remained at Stony Point until his death in 1894 at the age of 82. The property then passed through successive generations of the Jamieson family, each of whom bore the Christian name Robert. To date, five generations of direct male descendants named Robert Jamieson lived at and managed Stony Point, born in 1812, 1863, 1903, 1935 and 1967 respectively.

Robert Jamieson (1903-1994) MBE, with Margaret (Betty) Jamieson (née Anderson), 1930

During the twentieth century Stony Point continued to operate as a sheep station. The property retained its pastoral infrastructure, including a woolshed with a six-stand shearing board, draught-horse stables built around 1870, and extensive grazing paddocks overlooking Mount Emu Creek. An old swimming pool was constructed around 1890, and the homestead garden developed with mature plantings including chestnut trees and ornamental beds.

In August 1922, a worked named Mr. Tuddin fell approximately 25 feet while repairing a windmill on the estate. His fall was partially broken by a telegraph wire, and he survived after being taken unconscious to Mortlake Hospital.

In 1983, a line of 15 large electricity pylons was installed across the station to carry power to Portland, including supply for the aluminium smelter there.

As of 2017, Stony Point comprised approximately 5,910 acres (2,392 ha). The property carried around 6,000 fine-wool Merino sheep and 6,000 Coopworth ewes, with seasonal backpacker workers assisting during lambing and fencing periods.

== See also ==
- Terrinallum
- Larra
