= Terrinallum =

Historic homestead in Victoria, Australia

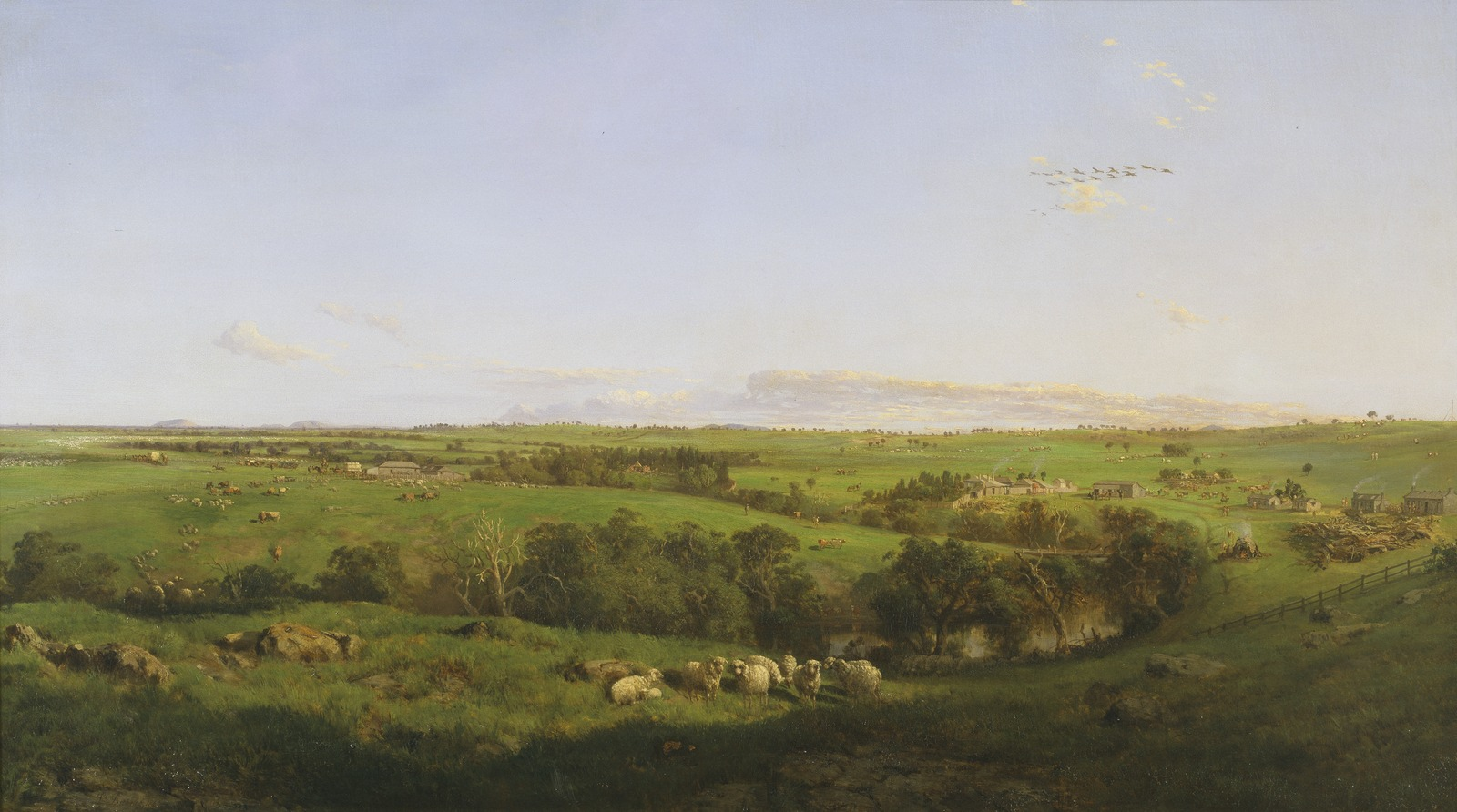
- Terrinallum Homestead (1868), painting by Louis Buvelot

- Location in the Shire of Moyne, Victoria
- 37°53′14″S 143°04′23″E
- Type: Homestead, associated built facilities and grounds
- Location: Pura Pura, Victoria, Australia
- Nearest city: Ararat

History
- Built: 1860 (original), ~1930s (present homestead)
- Built for: John Cumming Jr.

Site notes
- Architectural style: Art Deco

Victorian Heritage Register
- Official name: Terrinallum, Woolshed & Shearers Quarters
- Type: State heritage (built and natural)
- Designated: 15 April 2005
- Reference no.: 67789

Terrinallum (or Terinallum) is a historic homestead and pastoral property located near Darlington, Western Victoria, Australia, on the slopes of Mount Emu Creek. Established in 1846, it has been associated with a number of prominent pastoral families and is noted for its heritage homestead and extensive gardens. The property remains an example of a large Western District pastoral estate.

== History ==
Terrinallum was first settled in 1846 by the Clyde Company, a pastoral enterprise led by Scottish-born settler George Russell. Russell had migrated to Van Diemen's Land in 1831 before moving to the Port Phillip District, where he developed pastoral operations along the Moorabool and Leigh Rivers. As part of the company's expansion, Terrinallum became one of its key runs. In 1850, an extensive bluestone woolshed was constructed on a rise east of Mount Emu Creek, designed to accommodate large shearing teams and store substantial wool clips.

Following the dissolution of the Clyde Company in 1857, Terrinallum was sold to pastoralist John Cumming Jr., a prominent sheep breeder with extensive holdings across Victoria and New South Wales. Under his ownership, the property developed into a major Merino stud, with large-scale tree planting and pastoral improvement. By 1883, the estate covered approximately 47,000 acres and carried tens of thousands of sheep.

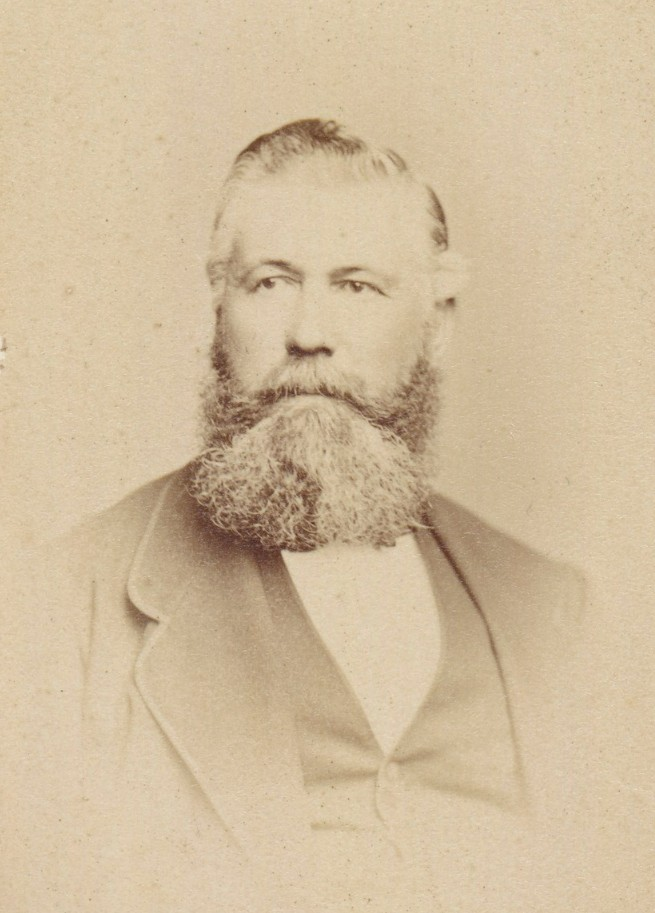
John Cumming

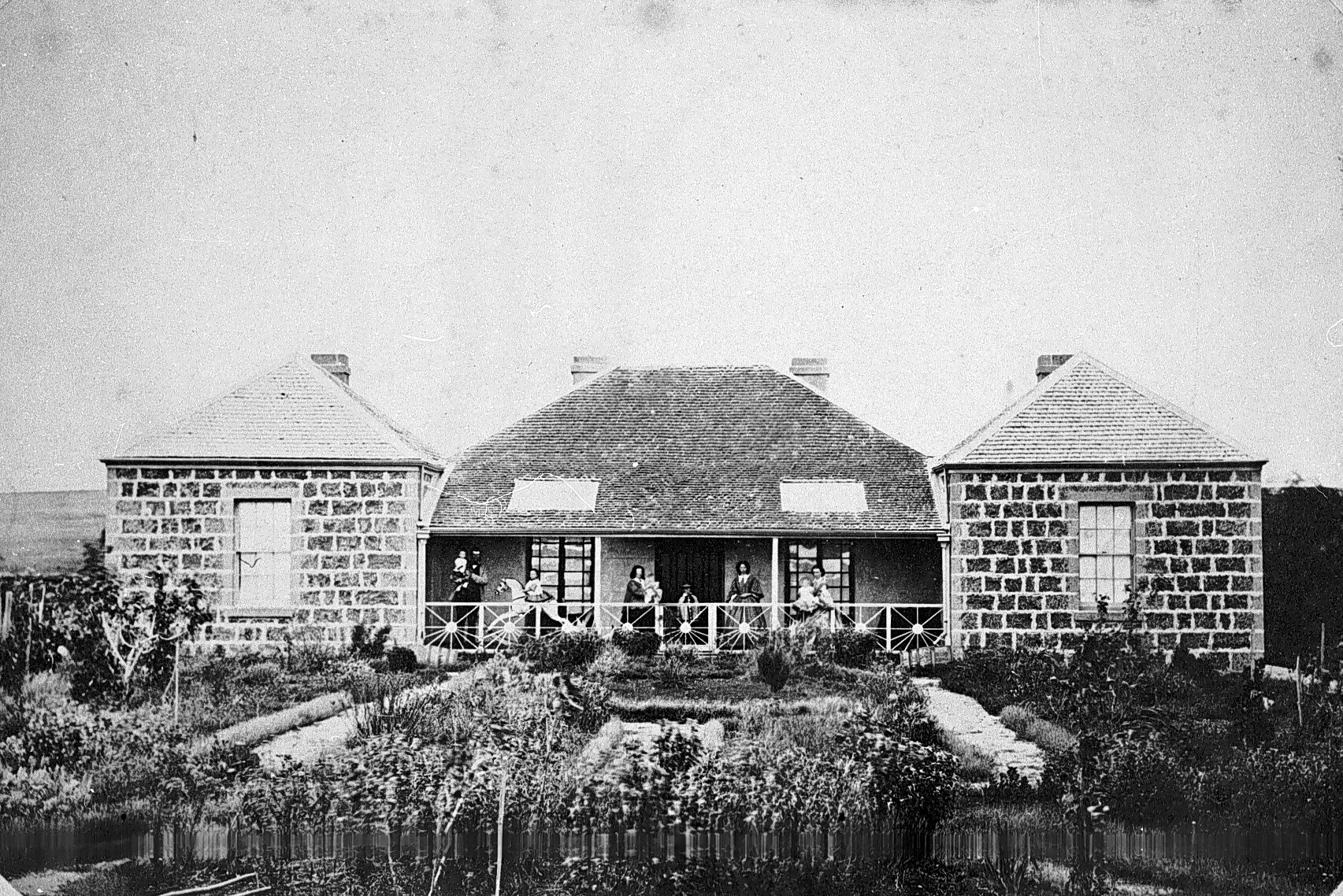
Terrinallum Homestead, 1860

During this period, the Swiss-born landscape painter Louis Buvelot produced several works depicting the homestead and surrounding landscape, including views of Mount Emu Creek and nearby lakes. One such painting was later donated to the National Gallery of Australia.

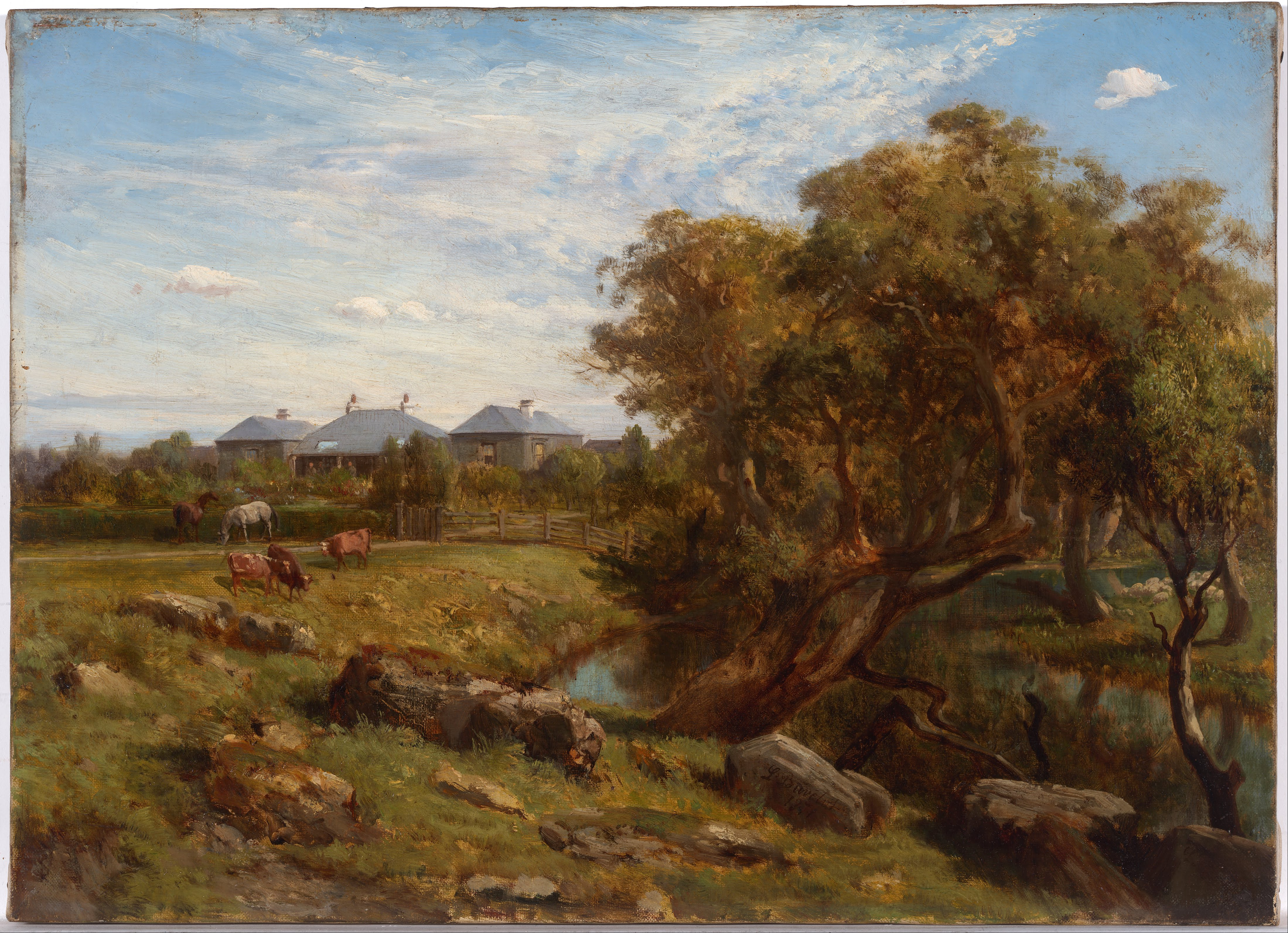
Terrinallum House and Emu Creek from near the lower garden gate (1871), painting by Louis Buvelot

After Cumming's tenure, the property passed through a number of notable pastoral families, including the Bailey, Wynne, McEachern and Barr Smith families. Across these successive ownerships, Terrinallum supported a range of agricultural enterprises, including Merino and cattle studs, dairying, pig farming and cropping.

In March 1938, following a concert at London's Royal Albert Hall, Australian conductor Bernard Heinze introduced Jewish-American musicians Yehudi and Hephzibah Menuhin to Australian siblings Lindsay and Nola Nicholas. Within a year, the siblings had married, and Hephzibah Menuhin relocated to Terrinallum with her husband Lindsay Nicholas. The move from international concert centres to rural Victoria significantly curtailed her performing career, although she continued to appear occasionally with Australian orchestras and later toured internationally.

During the Nicholas family's ownership, which extended for several decades, the homestead, originally built in a Colonial style, was remodelled in the 1930s in the Art Deco style. The house incorporated features reflecting Hephzibah Menuhin's musical interests, including an opening between rooms designed to carry sound, wooden baffle boards, and an early amplification system. The property became a site of cultural activity, hosting visitors and music instruction, while the house and gardens were substantially redesigned, particularly after damage caused by the 1939 bushfires. The estate also saw major agricultural investment, including infrastructure for breeding and exhibiting prize Angus cattle, and at one stage employed more than 100 workers. An employee resided on the second floor of the bullpen, so he could watch over the prize bulls day and night.

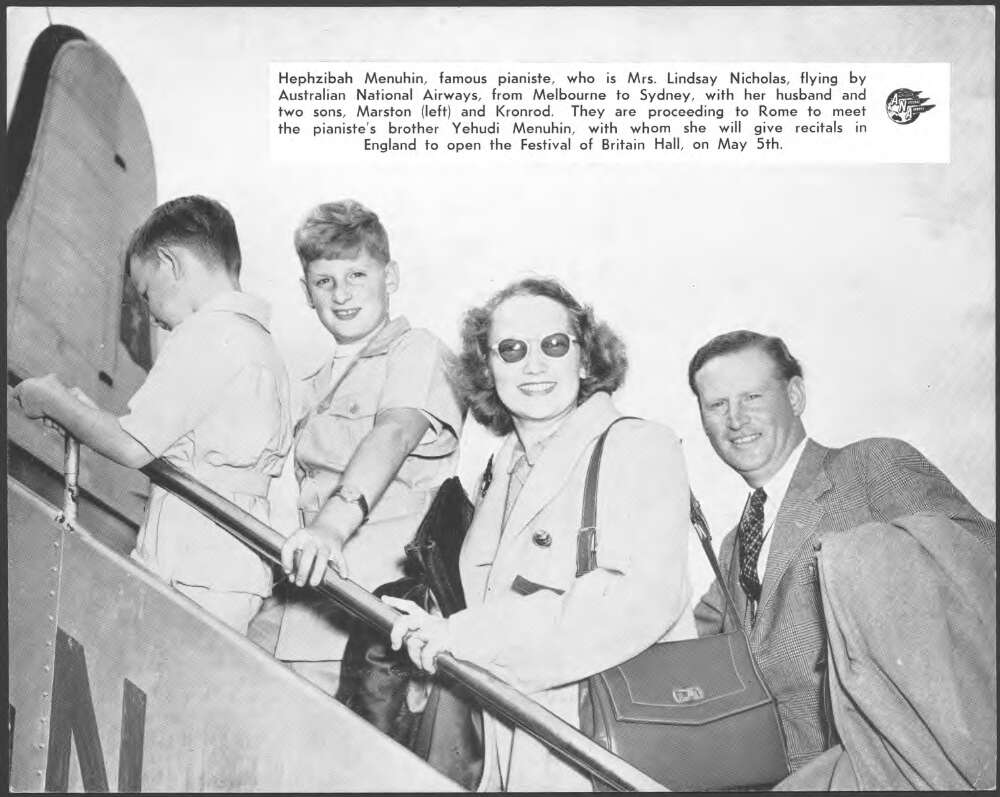
Hephzibah and Lindsay, with their children Kronrod and Marston

The size of the estate was reduced during the mid-twentieth century through the Soldier Settlement Scheme. During the Second World War, an aircraft-spotting tower was erected on the property, atop the bullpen, and was staffed continuously as part of local defence efforts. The Nicholas family also hosted European refugees at the homestead and established a travelling library service for the district.

Hephzibah Menuhin left Terrinallum in 1954, divorcing Lindsay and going on to pursue a relationship with social commentator Richard Hauser. A sunken garden, made by Hephzibah, was subsequently filled in by Lindsay.

In 1989, Terrinallum was purchased by Melbourne stockbroker John McIntosh and his wife Marita, following a period in which the property had been significantly reduced in size. Over subsequent decades, they expanded the holding through the reacquisition of former subdivision blocks and undertook extensive environmental works, including the planting of large numbers of trees and the rehabilitation of sections of Mount Emu Creek. By the early 21st century, the property had been developed into a mixed agricultural enterprise focused on sheep production and livestock agistment, while also supporting native wildlife such as platypuses and broglas.

=== Garden and other features ===
The gardens at Terrinallum, developed over many decades, extend across several acres surrounding the homestead and include formal plantings, hedges, water features and mature trees. Features include a long wisteria walk, reflection pool, recreational facilities, and extensive drystone walls, as well as plantings of both exotic and native species. A fountain was brought over from the village of Brignoles, in the south of France. Underground bluestone wells and an early engineered swimming pool system still exist on the property. Later additions have included olive groves and further landscape planting, supported by an established irrigation system. Notable trees in the garden include a box elder, blue spruce, desert ash, a claret ash planted by Kronrod Nicholas, and a weeping elm.
