= Gala (Victoria) =

Historic homestead in Victoria, Australia

- Gala Homestead, 1972

- Location in Corangamite Shire, Victoria
- 37°54′44″S 143°20′25″E
- Type: Homestead, associated built facilities and grounds
- Location: Lismore, Victoria, Australia
- Nearest city: Colac

History
- Built: 1871
- Built for: John Wilson

Site notes
- Architectural style: Victorian Gothic

Gala is a historic pastoral property and homestead near Lismore in western Victoria, Australia. Established in 1840 it is one of the district's early pastoral holdings and was subsequently associated with the Wilson and Currie families. The present homestead is a two-storey bluestone residence dating from 1871, surrounded by extensive gardens and plantations developed from the late nineteenth century. Once forming part of an estate of more than 20,000 acres, Gala was progressively subdivided for agricultural settlement during the early twentieth century. The property is included on the register of the National Trust of Australia (Victoria).

== History ==
Gala was established in 1840 by John Brown, who had arrived in the district from Van Diemen's Land. Brown named the run after Galashiels, his birthplace in Scotland. The property subsequently passed through a succession of pastoralists during the 1850s. John Aitken purchased it in 1852 and sold it approximately four years later to John Matheson, who in turn disposed of it to Andrew Lyell. After another comparatively brief period of ownership, Lyell sold Gala to Robert Adams.

In 1859, the run was acquired by James Wilson, then in partnership with John Wilson and A. Buchanan. The partnership continued through the following decade, during which the pastoral lease was progressively converted to freehold. When the partnership was dissolved in 1871, the holding was divided. John Wilson received the eastern portion, which retained the name Gala, while the western portion became Titanga.

View of the homestead with a cairn marking the site of John Brown's original 1842 homestead

The present Gala homestead was constructed in 1871 during the Wilson period. Built principally of bluestone and rising to two storeys, the house was subsequently enlarged and improved by later owners. Wilson also began developing the extensive garden surrounding the residence, taking advantage of the fertile soil and establishing a landscaped setting around what had otherwise become a largely treeless pastoral plain.

Following Wilson's death, Gala was purchased from his executors by prominent Western District pastoralist John Lang Currie in 1888–1889. At the time of Currie's acquisition, the size of the estate was around 20,000 to 30,000 acres. Although the Currie family also held nearby properties including Titanga and Larra, Gala continued to be operated as a distinct pastoral estate.

One of the most significant changes to Gala under the Curries was the extensive replanting of trees across the property. The country had originally supported scattered native vegetation, including sheoaks and honeysuckles, but grazing and other environmental pressures had left much of the estate exposed by the later nineteenth century. John Lang Currie responded by establishing large shelter plantations.

The planting program eventually transformed hundreds of acres. Sugar gums and wattles were extensively used, while Pinus insignis was planted around the homestead. Long rows of trees were established beside roads and substantial shelter belts divided and protected paddocks. By the early twentieth century approximately 700 acres of Gala were reported to be under plantations. Apart from changing the appearance of the open plains, the shelter reduced exposure to strong winds and was credited with improving livestock condition and increasing the carrying capacity of the estate.

John Lang Currie's sons Edwin and Allan Currie inherited Gala in 1898 and initially operated it in partnership. In 1899 they also purchased the nearby Mount Elephant property and incorporated it into their pastoral interests. The partnership was dissolved in 1901, after which Edwin Currie became the sole proprietor of Gala.

Mantlepiece at Gala

During Edwin Currie's ownership, the homestead remained the centre of an extensively developed pastoral property. By this period the 1871 residence had undergone additions and modernisation and was equipped with its own sewerage system, petrol-gas lighting and a telephone connection to the Lismore exchange. The established garden was irrigated from three large dams through a network of pipes supplying both the grounds and associated station buildings. Dense plantations surrounding the homestead created a sheltered setting distinct from the relatively open plains beyond the estate.

Parts of Gala were increasingly sold for closer agricultural settlement during the early twentieth century. By 1908 approximately 7,000 acres had recently been released from an estate then reported at around 22,000 acres. 37 lots were offered, of which 22 had been sold by April that year, predominantly to local purchasers. Farming blocks fetched between £5 10s and £8 10s per acre, while smaller parcels nearer Lismore reached £14 per acre.

Subdivision continued in subsequent years. In 1915, Edwin Currie sold a further parcel of slightly more than 2,000 acres of Gala to Borbridge Bros., further reducing the size of the original pastoral holding.

Edwin Currie remained at Gala for the remainder of his life. He married Laura Grey Smith, daughter of National Bank general manager Frank Grey Smith, and they had two children, John Clive Currie and Evora Frances Currie. Edwin died at Gala in August 1938 following a short illness, aged 76.

Gala subsequently remained associated with the Currie family. During the Second World War, Edwin's son Captain J. Clive Currie and his family were living at the property. In 1940 Clive's daughter Sheila Fraser Currie married Lieutenant Norman Dennis, eldest son of Alex and Mrs Dennis of Tarndwarncoort, linking two longstanding Western District pastoral properties.

In 1987, Tom and Monica Dennis acquired Gala, continuing the property's association with descendants of established pastoral families of the district.

== See also ==
- Ettrick
- Larra
- Stony Point
- Gnarpurt
