= Glenthompson =

- Town
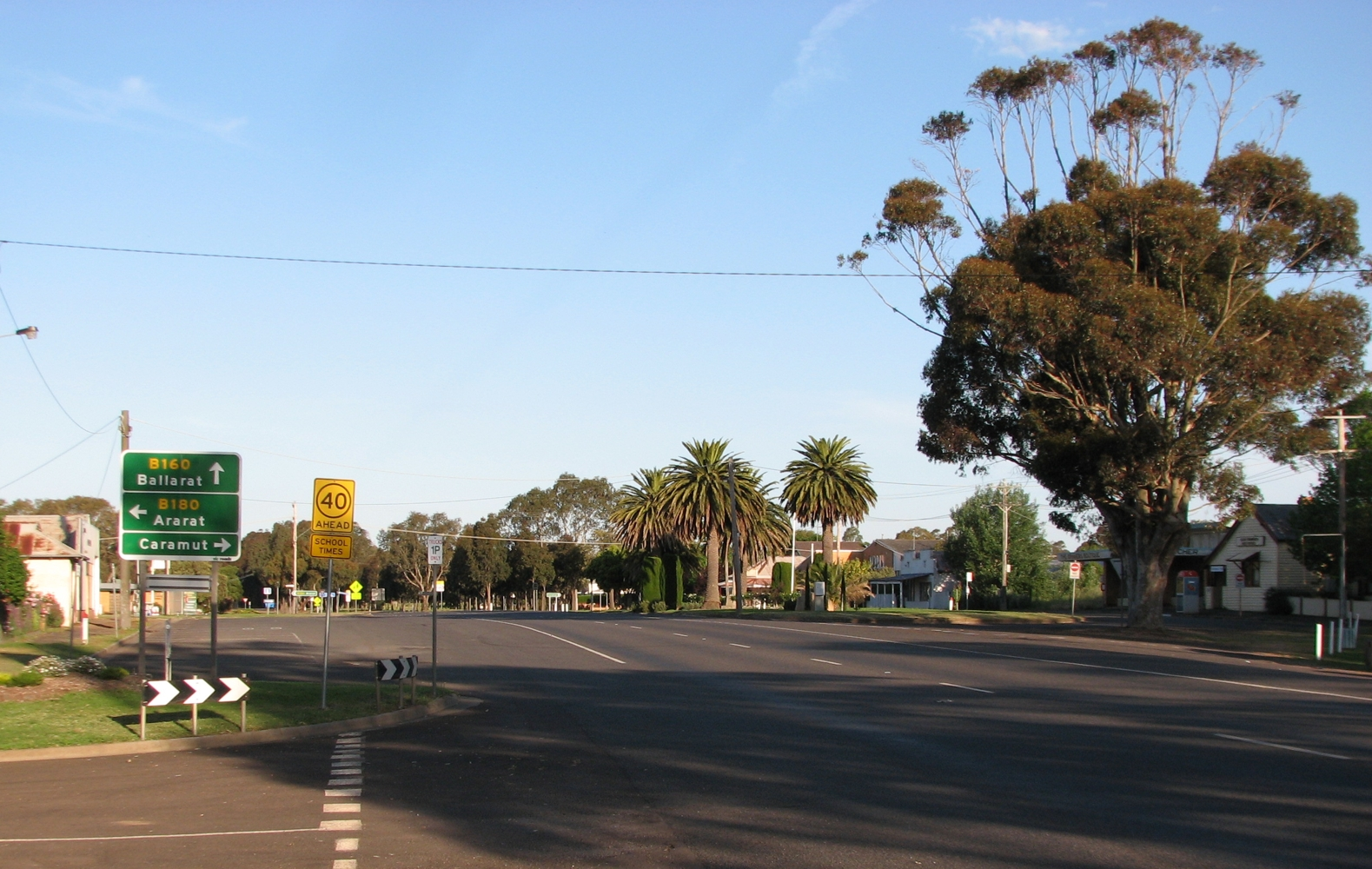
- Western approach to Glenthompson on Glenelg Highway

- Coordinates: 37°38′0″S 142°32′0″E
- Country: Australia
- State: Victoria
- LGA: Shire of Southern Grampians
- Location: 267 km (166 mi) W of Melbourne; 60 km (37 mi) SW of Ararat; 50 km (31 mi) NE of Hamilton; 18 km (11 mi) E of Dunkeld

Government
  - State electorate: Lowan
  - Federal division: Division of Wannon

Population
  - Total: 232 (2016 census)
- Postcode: 3293

Glenthompson is a town in the Australian state of Victoria. It lies on the Glenelg Highway between Hamilton and Ballarat, close to the Grampian mountain range. At the 2016 census, Glenthompson and the surrounding area had a population of 234.

Its most notable landmark is the tall brickworks chimney that is also the symbol of the town's main industry for a period of time, as it provided bricks for regional buildings constructed in the post-war era. The brickworks is now closed but people can arrange a tour by appointment.

== History ==
Originally, a small township named Yuppeckiar was built approximately five kilometres away, but it was moved to the present site of Glenthompson because of the construction of the railway linking Ballarat and Hamilton. The Post Office opened on November 1, 1866 as Glenthompson, was known for some months in 1872 as Yuppeckiar before reverting to Glenthompson.

Pastoral settlement in the Glenthompson district began in 1848, and the subdivision of the land began in 1853. One of the resulting portions was the 'Glenronald' property (which may be the source of the first part of the town's name, with the second part believed to have come from the name of a surveyor or local land owner).

Early village settlement occurred three miles (5 km) west of the present Glenthompson township, at a location on the Dunkeld Road known as Strathmore or Yuppeckiar (also locally known as The Nine-mile and Jack of Clubs). In 1865 there was one public-house at Strathmore, but the settlement attained further amenities as land selections were taken up in the vicinity. By 1872 Strathmore had two public-houses, a blacksmith, shoemaker, a large store, a Catholic church, a school and a steam-powered flour mill.

The railway line between Ararat and Hamilton was completed in October 1877, with a station built at Glenthompson (which stimulated the growth of Glenthompson at the expense of Strathmore).

In 1901 the Thompson brothers opened a brickworks about 20 kilometres from Glenthompson. The brickworks were later transferred to a clay-pit near the township.

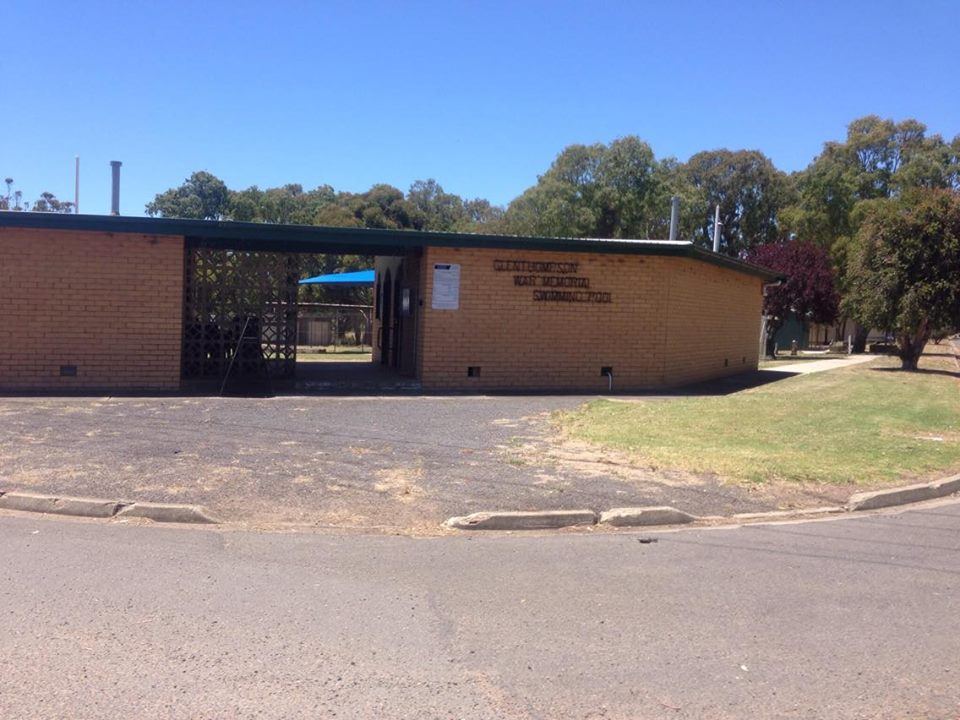
Glenthompson War Memorial Swimming Pool

Glenthompson is now a small rural town serving as a minor transport and service centre for the surrounding farming district.

== Amenities ==
Glenthompson is distinctive in that the town's hotel, Mac's Hotel, was built across the road from the railway station, some distance from the main road, unlike other country pubs in towns of a similar size, highlighting the importance of the railway in the town's development. This hotel burned down during the late 1800s on a different plot of land than the one that closed in 2013. The hotel that closed in 2013 was actually a private home, that was converted in the mid 20th century to a hotel long after its construction.

Rose Cottage in McLennan Street was first built in 1850 and was used for business as a blacksmith, the local bakery, and the front room for dressmaking and alteration.

In 1996 residents started the Glenthompson Historical Group Inc. which operates a museum out of the former Glenthompson Railway Station. The History Centre is open to visit on Sundays from 12pm or by appointment.

St Peter's Anglican Church in McLennan St (Caramut Road) had the story of St Peter produced as a mural around the internal walls of the church. Local artist Gareth Colliton from Warrnambool used local identities in place of the traditional faces to produce this modern variation. The Church is open every day.

== Sport ==
The town, in conjunction with nearby township Dunkeld, has an Australian Rules football team, Glenthompson-Dunkeld (AKA Rams), competing in the Mininera & District Football League (MDFL). In 2010, the team won the league Premiership.

Prior to 2004, the Glenthompson Football Club (AKA Bloods) had competed in the MDFL for more than half a century. The club had secured senior premierships in 1969, 1974, 1978, 1982, 1983 and 1985. Over the history of the football club they have played in the now defunct Willaura and District Football Association (1921–27), Mount Rouse and Willaura District Football Association (1928), Western Football Association (1929), Hopkins Football Association (1930), Western and Hamilton Football Association (1931–33), Hamilton and District Football Association (1935–40) and the Dunkeld and District Football League (1945–47).

In the past, the town has had a number of different sports including having its own 9 hole golf course. Most clubs have now closed. Former sports clubs include - Glenthompson Golf Club, Glenthompson Tennis Club, Glenthompson Basketball team (c. 1923), Glenthompson Cricket Club

== Education ==
The first school was opened in 1868. This was rebuilt in 1902, featuring a steeped structure. In the same year, a Mechanics' Institute was opened.

In 1998 the school amalgamated and became an outer campus of the Dunkeld Consolidated school. In 2011, with only one student still enrolled at this campus, a decision was made to close the campus. The children of the town now go either to Dunkeld or Lake Bolac for their Primary years.

Secondary school is obtained in either Lake Bolac or Hamilton, with buses taking the children of the town and its surrounds.

== Climate ==
Climate data for Glenthompson
Month	Jan	Feb	Mar	Apr	May	Jun	Jul	Aug	Sep	Oct	Nov	Dec	Year
Average rainfall mm	36.3	29.2	33.1	45.1	52.6	53.3	63.3	70.4	60.7	56.2	50.2	40.9	595.8
Average rainfall inches	1.43	1.15	1.30	1.78	2.07	2.10	2.49	2.77	2.39	2.21	1.98	1.61	23.46

== See also ==
- Brie Brie
