= All Saints' Anglican Church, Derrinallum =

Closed Anglican church in Derrinallum, Victoria, Australia

- All Saints' Church of England Church
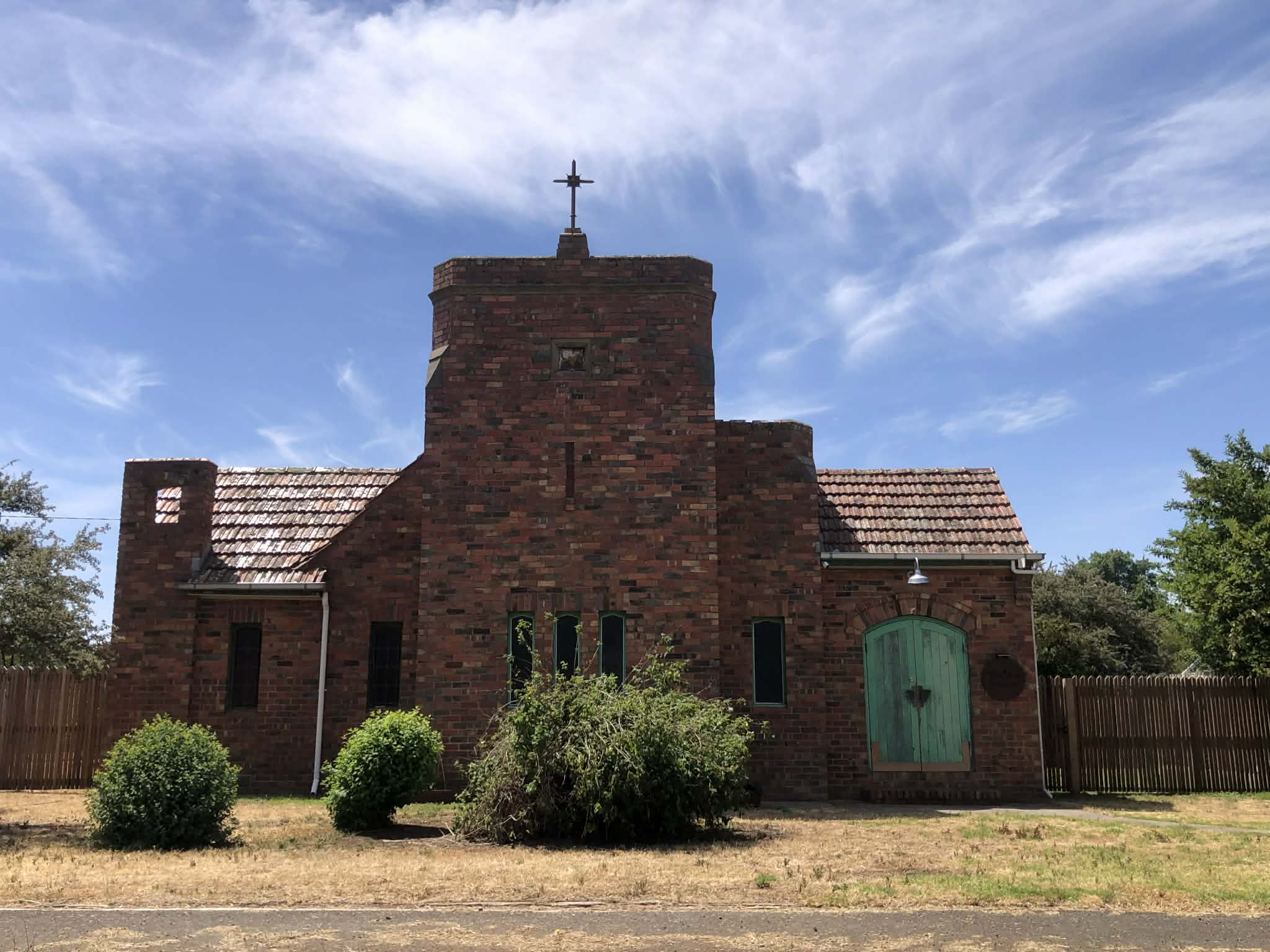
- All Saints' Anglican Church, January 2026
- All Saints' Anglican Church, Derrinallum
- 37°56′53″S 143°13′07″E
- Location: 72 Main Street, Derrinallum, Victoria
- Country: Australia
- Denomination: Anglican Church of Australia

History
- Former name: St James' Anglican Church
- Status: Closed (private residence)

Architecture
- Architect: Unknown
- Style: Gothic Revival
- Completed: 1925 (original church), 1953 (present church building)

Administration
- Province: Victoria
- Diocese: Ballarat

All Saints' Anglican Church is a closed Anglican church in the town of Derrinallum, Victoria, Australia. The church, which replaced an earlier church destroyed by a bushfire in 1944, was sold in 2017, and is now a private residence. The church is notable as the original location of the heritage-listed Fairbairn Windows.

== History ==
In 1925, an earlier Anglican church existed within the town, but was destroyed, along with much of the town, by a bushfire in 1944. Few records of this early church exist. A ball was held in the Mechanics Institute in order to raise funds for the church on November 12 1946, with over 500 people in attendance.

The foundation stone for the current church building was laid on the 18th August 1950 by the Right Reverend W. H. Johnson of Ballarat. The current church building was opened on 3 July 1953 by Right Reverend W. H. Johnson, assisted by Archdeacon Richards, and named "St James' Anglican Church". It was built by an unknown architect, using clinker brick, and in a small-scale interpretation of the Gothic style.

It is unclear when the church closed, but the property was sold in 2017 and has now been turned into a private residence.

=== Fairbairn stained glass windows ===
The church originally contained two stained glass windows, dedicated in memoriam of James Fairbairn, a World War 1 veteran and politician who used to live at Mount Elephant homestead, who was killed in the 1940 Canberra air disaster. The windows were commissioned by James' widow, "Peggy" Fairbairn. The windows were designed by Geoffrey Clarke. Geoffrey Clarke alongside Lawrence Lee and Keith New were among a team who designed the windows for the reconstruction of Coventry Cathedral in England. The windows employ a sombre blue, grey and white pallette, and these are reputedly two known projects of Geoffrey Clarke in Australia. Whilst the windows themselves are heritage listed, the church itself is not.

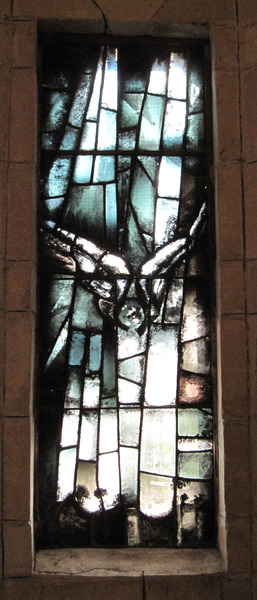
Dove of the Holy Spirit

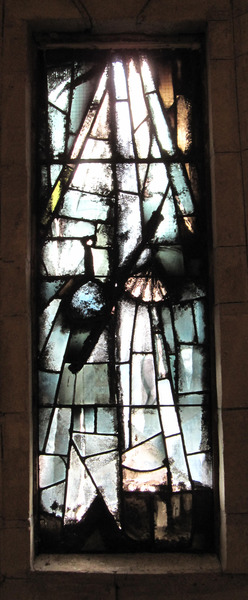
St James the Pilgrim

In 2016, Geelong Grammar School, where James Fairbairn went to boarding school, acquired the windows with the permission of the Bishop-in-council of the Anglican Diocese of Ballarat. They now flank either side of the staircase beneath the school's clock tower.
