= Darlington, Victoria =

Darlington
- Town
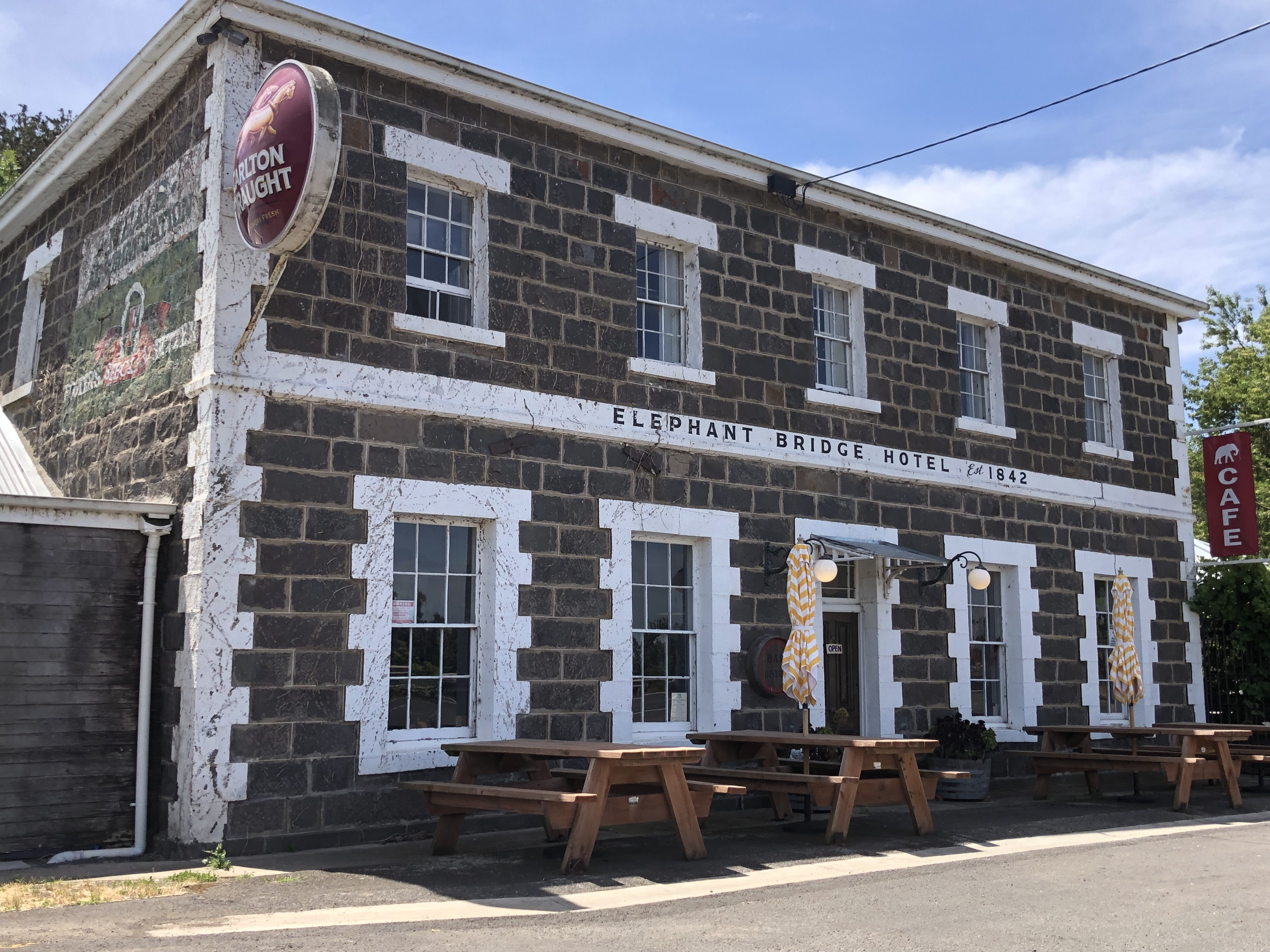
- The Elephant Bridge Hotel

- Coordinates: 38°00′0″S 143°3′0″E
- Country: Australia
- State: Victoria
- LGA: Corangamite Shire
- Location: 194 km (121 mi) SW of Melbourne; 99 km (62 mi) SW of Ballarat; 77 km (48 mi) NE of Warrnambool; 23 km (14 mi) NE of Mortlake

Government
  - State electorate: Polwarth, Lowan
  - Federal division: Wannon

Population
  - Total: 84 (SAL 2021)
- Postcode: 3271

Darlington is a locality in the Western District of Victoria, Australia. The locality is in the Shire of Corangamite and on the Hamilton Highway, 194 kilometres (121 mi) south west of the state capital, Melbourne. Mount Emu Creek passes through the locality .

The locality has one remaining pub, the Elephant Bridge Hotel. The Elephant Bridge Hotel is believed to be one of the oldest continuously licensed pubs in Victoria. The kitchen and cellar were built in 1842 and the rest of the building some years later. The pub claims to have four resident ghosts.

== See also ==
- Stony Point
