= Hamilton Highway =

Highway in Victoria

Hamilton Highway Victoria
- Coordinates: 38.147°S 144.353°E (East end); 37.743°S 142.052°E (West end)

General information
- Type: Highway
- Length: 229.2 km (142 mi)
- Gazetted: March 1914 (as Main Road); 1959/60 (as State Highway)
- Route number(s): B140 (1998–present)
- Former route number: State Route 106 (1986–1998)

Major junctions
- East end: Portarlington Road; Newtown, Geelong
- Princes Highway; Geelong Ring Road; Hopkins Highway
- West end: Glenelg Highway; Hamilton, Victoria

Location(s)
- Major settlements: Fyansford, Cressy, Lismore, Mortlake, Penshurst

Highway system
- Highways in Australia; National Highway • Freeways in Australia; Highways in Victoria

Hamilton Highway is a rural highway through the Barwon South West region of Victoria, Australia, linking Geelong and the town of Hamilton.

== Route ==
Hamilton Highway commences at the intersection of Latrobe Terrace and Portarlington Road in Geelong and heads in a westerly direction as a two-lane, single carriageway through Fyansford, crossing the Barwon River and an interchange with Geelong Ring Road, before leaving the Geelong suburbs and continuing west as a rural highway through the localities of Inverleigh, Cressy, Lismore, Mortlake, and Penshurst to eventually terminate at the intersection with Glenelg Highway at the eastern edge of Hamilton. Glenelg Highway continues west across the border with South Australia to Mount Gambier, making Hamilton Highway a popular alternative Melbourne-Mount Gambier route (being roughly 50 km shorter than a corresponding journey via the Victorian coast along Highway 1).

== History ==
The passing of the Country Roads Act 1912 through the Parliament of Victoria provided for the establishment of the Country Roads Board and its ability to declare Main Roads, taking responsibility for the management, construction and care of the state's major roads from local municipalities. (Geelong-)Inverleigh Road from Geelong to Inverleigh was declared a Main Road on 16 March 1914, and Cressy-Inverleigh Road from Inverleigh to Cressy was declared a Main Road on 9 June 1925.

The passing of the Highways and Vehicles Act 1924 provided for the declaration of State Highways, roads two-thirds financed by the state government through the Country Roads Board. Hamilton Highway was declared a State Highway in the 1959/60 financial year, from Geelong via Cressy and Mortlake to Hamilton (for a total of 143 miles), subsuming the original declarations of Geelong-Inverleigh Road and Cressy-Inverleigh Road as Main Roads; before this declaration, this road was also referred to as Geelong-Hamilton Road.

The Geelong end of the highway was once routed along Hyland Street through Fyansford, until the construction of Deviation Road between 1931 and 1932 with unemployment labour during the Great Depression. Opened in 1933, it was cut into the hillside, the surface was originally of concrete construction. The road opened 54 years after the first petition by Fyansford residents for such a road.

A new bridge over Woady Yaloak River in Cressy was opened in 1995, at a cost of $2.86 million, adjacent to and replacing a structure built in 1854 and rebuilt in 1880 after fire damage, retained but now closed to vehicular traffic.

Hamilton Highway was signed as State Route 106 between Geelong and Hamilton in 1986; with Victoria's conversion to the newer alphanumeric system in the late 1990s, this was replaced by route B140.

The passing of the Road Management Act 2004 granted the responsibility of overall management and development of Victoria's major arterial roads to VicRoads: in 2004, VicRoads re-declared the road as Hamilton Highway (Arterial #6780), beginning at Latrobe Terrace at Geelong and ending at Glenelg Highway in Hamilton.

== Major intersections and towns ==
LGA	Location	km	mi	Destinations	Notes
Greater Geelong	Newtown	0.0	0.0	Ryrie Street (C123 east) – Geelong, Drysdale, Portarlington	Eastern terminus of highway and route B140
Greater Geelong	Newtown	0.0	0.0	Latrobe Terrace (A10/Tourist Drive 21 north, south) – Corio, Waurn Ponds	
Greater Geelong	Newtown	1.5	0.93	Shannon Avenue (C136) – Belmont, Corio	
Greater Geelong	Fyansford	3.9	2.4	Hyland Street (C118) – Corio	Roundabout
Greater Geelong	Fyansford	5.4	3.4	Geelong Ring Road (M1) – Melbourne, Colac, Warrnambool Mount Gambier, Adelaide	
Greater Geelong	Fyansford	6.0	3.7	Fyansford–Gheringhap Road (C137) – Ballarat	
Golden Plains	Stonehaven	8.3	5.2	Merrawarp Road (C111 south) – Ceres, Moriac, Torquay	Concurrency with route C111
Golden Plains	Stonehaven	8.7	5.4	Friend in Hand Road (C111 north) – Gheringhap, Ballarat	Concurrency with route C111
Golden Plains	Inverleigh	27.4	17.0	Inverleigh–Winchelsea Road (C145) – Winchelsea	
Golden Plains	Inverleigh	31.7	19.7	Inverleigh–Shelford Road (C144) – Shelford	
Colac Otway	Cressy	64.4	40.0	Colac–Ballarat Road (C146 north) – Rokewood, Ballarat	Concurrency with route C146
Colac Otway	Cressy	65.7	40.8	Colac–Ballarat Road (C146 south) – Cressy, Colac	Concurrency with route C146
Corangamite	Duverney	72.1	44.8	Foxhow Road (C164) – Camperdown	
Corangamite	Lismore	89.9	55.9	Lismore–Scarsdale Road (C171) – Ballarat	
Corangamite	Lismore	94.7	58.8	Camperdown–Lismore Road (C165) – Camperdown	
Corangamite	Lismore	96.6	60.0	Lismore–Skipton Road (C172) – Camperdown, Skipton, Beaufort	
Corangamite	Darlington	121.5	75.5	Darlington Road (C173) – Camperdown	
Moyne	Mortlake	144.5	89.8	Mortlake–Ararat Road (C148 north) – Lake Bolac, Ararat; Terang–Mortlake Road (C156 south) – Terang, Cobden	
Moyne	Mortlake	146.3	90.9	Hopkins Highway (B120) – Warrnambool	
Moyne	Caramut	177.4	110.2	Warrnambool–Caramut Road (C174) – Warrnambool	
Southern Grampians	Penshurst	201.4	125.1	Penshurst–Dunkeld Road (C178 north) – Dunkeld, Horsham, Stawell	Concurrency with route C178
Southern Grampians	Penshurst	202.4	125.8	Penshurst–Warrnambool Road (C178 south) – Port Fairy, Warrnambool; Macarthur–Penshurst Road (C185 west) – Macarthur	Concurrency with route C178
Southern Grampians	Hamilton	229.2	142.4	Glenelg Highway (B160) – Hamilton, Portland, Horsham, Mount Gambier	Western terminus of highway and route B140
1.000 mi = 1.609 km; 1.000 km = 0.621 mi: Concurrency terminus; Route transition

== See also ==
- Highways in Australia
- Highways in Victoria
