= Lismore, Victoria =

Lismore Bongerimennin
- Town
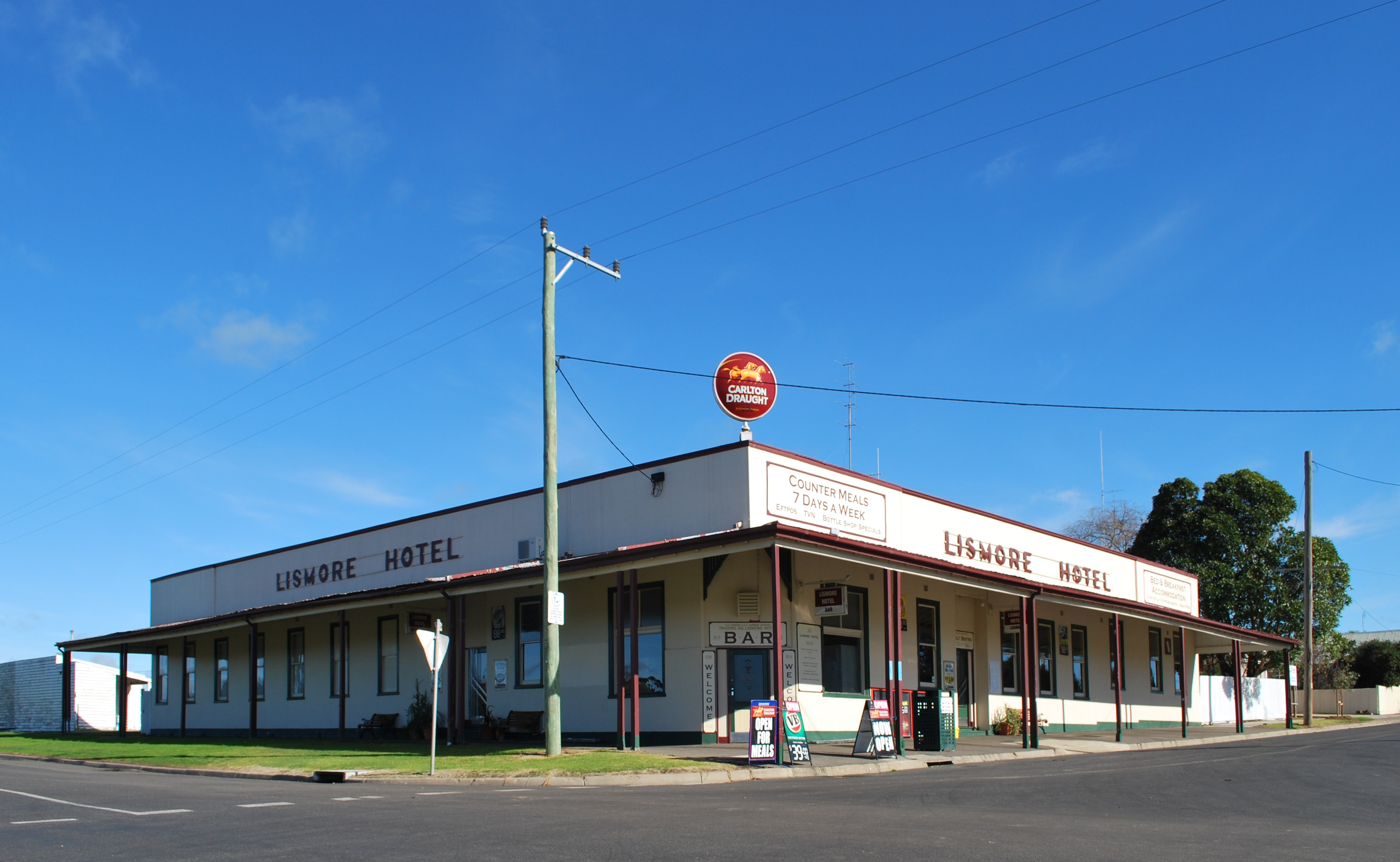
- Lismore Hotel

- Coordinates: 37°58′0″S 143°21′0″E
- Country: Australia
- State: Victoria
- LGA: Corangamite Shire
- Location: 170 km (110 mi) W of Melbourne; 96 km (60 mi) W of Geelong; 72 km (45 mi) SW of Ballarat; 31 km (19 mi) E of Cressy; 12 km (7.5 mi) E of Derrinallum
- Established: 1840

Government
  - State electorate: Polwarth
  - Federal division: Wannon
- Elevation: 178 m (584 ft)

Population
  - Total: 513 (2006 census)
- Postcode: 3324
- Mean max temp: 19.2 °C (66.6 °F)
- Mean min temp: 8.1 °C (46.6 °F)
- Annual rainfall: 621.1 mm (24.45 in)

Lismore is a town in Victoria, Australia, located on the Hamilton Highway 170 kilometres (106 mi) west of Melbourne. It is part of the Corangamite Shire local government area. At the 2016 census, Lismore had a population of 420. Its Aboriginal name is cited in colonial reports as Bongerimennin.

== History ==
The area was first settled by Europeans in 1840, when a John Brown was forced to stop to repair a wagon axle that broke when he attempted to ford a creek. Lismore was surveyed and named in the 1850s, by which point the settlement had developed to include a public house and a number of houses. Lismore Post Office opened on 1 December 1864. Lismore since grew to become a prosperous service town for the surrounding fine wool producing properties.

== The town today ==
The town is situated on the Hamilton Highway, just a few kilometres from the northernmost lakes in the Colac Lakes system, which includes Lake Corangamite and Lake Colac.

One of the state's oldest private chapels is located immediately outsied of the township at Gnarpurt, a historic homestead. The Gothic Revival style building was built by Scottish emigrant Adam Robertson in 1867 from bluestone. There is also large wool-shed built by Robertson.

The town and surrounding area produces wool, lamb, cereals, and oilseed canola. Businesses include three cafes, a hotel, a B&B, a service station, a grain dealer, a farm machinery dealer, a stock and station agent, a post office and newsagent, a sawmill, several craft shops and a supermarket. There is a community health centre with a visiting doctor. There is also a swimming pool and several playgrounds. Nearby Derrinallum has a preschool, a primary school, and a P-12 college.

Sport in Lismore, includes golf, netball, football, cricket, squash, lawn bowls, and croquet. The town, in conjunction with neighbouring township Derrinallum, has an Australian Rules football team, Lismore-Derrinallum, who compete in the Mininera & District Football League. The Lismore Oddfellows Cricket Club was formed at the White Sean Hotel as the Lismore Cricket Club in 1888 and currently competes in the Grenville Cricket Association.

Nearby geographical points of interest include Lake Tooliorook and Mount Elephant, as well as a number of other lakes, some of which have been Ramsar-listed.

== 2006 train accident ==
A level crossing accident occurred on 25 May 2006 at Lismore. A truck failed to stop at a crossing, derailing the train, and killing the truck driver.

== Notable people ==
Notable people from Lismore include Gordon Bryant, a Labor politician and minister in the Whitlam government, Tony Street, a Liberal politician and minister in the Fraser government, Olympic silver medallist Ji Wallace, and musician Simon Hussey. AFL/VFL Footballers to have played with the Lismore Football Club include Ron Hosking, Bill Hosking, Scott Hosking, John Lord, John Fox and Allan Everett, and Daniel Nicholson for the Lismore/Derrinallum Football Netball Club.

== Climate ==
Climate data for Lismore, Victoria
Month	Jan	Feb	Mar	Apr	May	Jun	Jul	Aug	Sep	Oct	Nov	Dec	Year
Record high °C (°F)	43.3 (109.9)	42.2 (108.0)	39.4 (102.9)	34.3 (93.7)	26.4 (79.5)	22.2 (72.0)	21.6 (70.9)	25.0 (77.0)	29.4 (84.9)	33.0 (91.4)	38.8 (101.8)	41.5 (106.7)	43.3 (109.9)
Mean daily maximum °C (°F)	26.6 (79.9)	26.2 (79.2)	23.9 (75.0)	19.5 (67.1)	15.8 (60.4)	13.2 (55.8)	12.4 (54.3)	13.6 (56.5)	15.8 (60.4)	18.3 (64.9)	20.9 (69.6)	23.8 (74.8)	19.2 (66.6)
Mean daily minimum °C (°F)	11.5 (52.7)	12.1 (53.8)	11.0 (51.8)	8.8 (47.8)	7.1 (44.8)	5.3 (41.5)	4.6 (40.3)	5.1 (41.2)	6.0 (42.8)	7.2 (45.0)	8.4 (47.1)	10.2 (50.4)	8.1 (46.6)
Record low °C (°F)	2.8 (37.0)	1.7 (35.1)	1.3 (34.3)	−1.1 (30.0)	−0.6 (30.9)	−3.3 (26.1)	−3.9 (25.0)	−2.2 (28.0)	−1.1 (30.0)	−1.9 (28.6)	0.6 (33.1)	2.0 (35.6)	−3.9 (25.0)
Average rainfall mm (inches)	39.3 (1.55)	35.2 (1.39)	34.9 (1.37)	50.0 (1.97)	54.5 (2.15)	53.8 (2.12)	58.8 (2.31)	68.0 (2.68)	61.9 (2.44)	63.5 (2.50)	54.7 (2.15)	46.9 (1.85)	621 (24.4)
Average rainy days (≥ 1.0 mm)	4.7	4.3	5.3	8.1	10.0	10.8	12.3	13.8	11.8	10.4	8.2	6.5	106.2
Source: Australian Bureau of Meteorology

== See also ==
- Larra
- Gala
- Ettrick
