= Derrinallum =

- Town
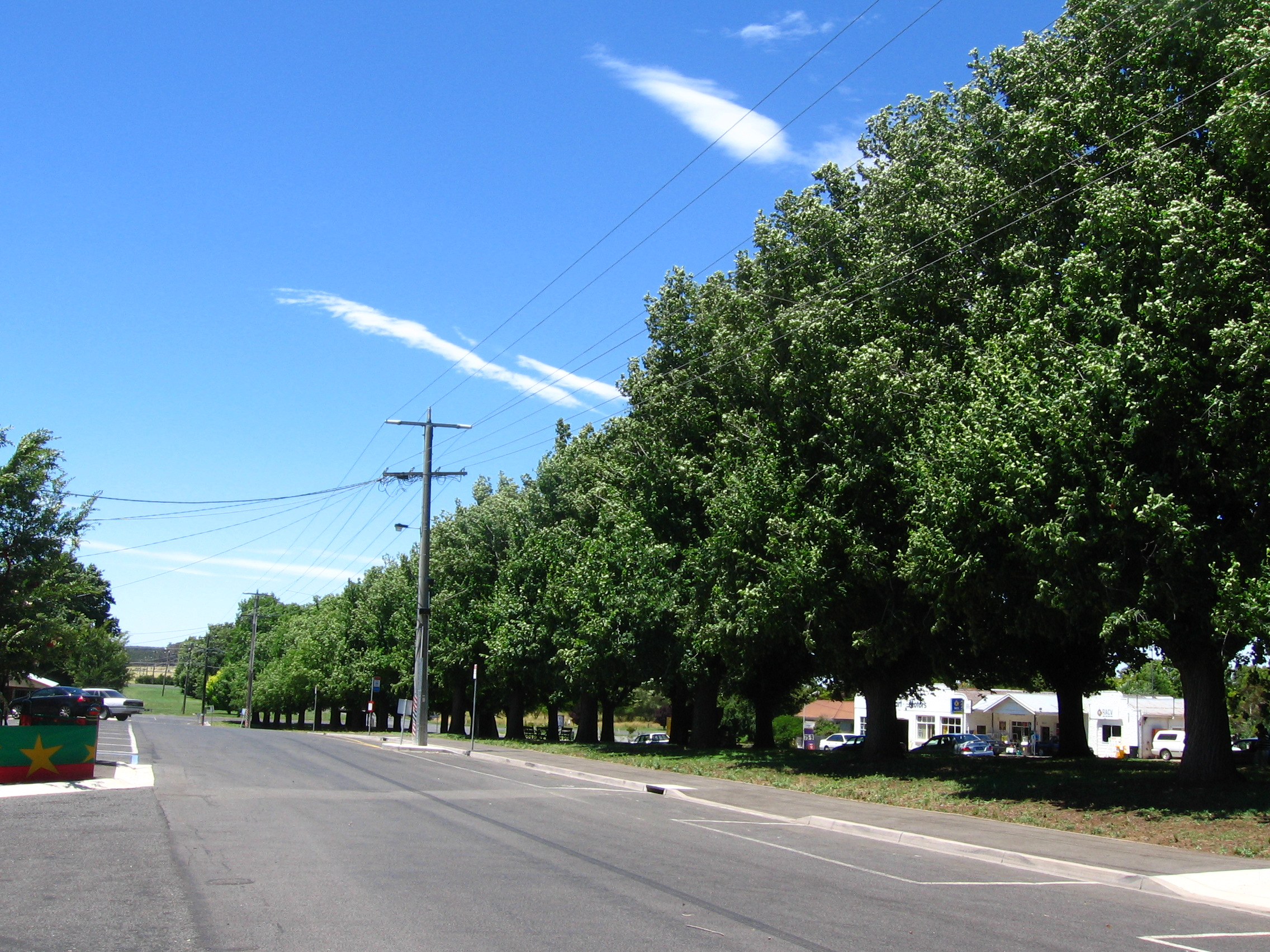
- Avenue on main street

- Coordinates: 37°57′0″S 143°13′0″E
- Country: Australia
- State: Victoria
- LGA: Corangamite Shire
- Location: 183 km (114 mi) W of Melbourne; 108 km (67 mi) W of Geelong; 42 km (26 mi) NE of Mortlake; 42 km (26 mi) W of Cressy

Government
  - State electorate: Polwarth
  - Federal division: Wannon

Population
  - Total: 557 (2006 census)
- Postcode: 3325

Derrinallum is a town in Victoria, Australia, located on the Hamilton Highway, in the Corangamite Shire. The town is the centre for the surrounding farming community and lies at the foot of Mount Elephant. Mount Elephant is a 380 m-high conical breached scoria cone formed by an dormant volcano.

At the 2001 census, Derrinallum had a population of 266. At the 2016 census, Derrinallum had a population of 557.

== History ==
The Djargurd Wurrong people are the traditional Aboriginal owners of the Derrinallum district. The Djargurd Wurrong people consist of twelve clans that traditionally shared a common language and family ties, but each clan had its own territory. For tens of thousands of years they successfully occupied the area as a semi-nomadic hunter gatherer society. During European colonisation in the 1830s, Mount Elephant was located within the territory of the clan Teerinyillum Gundidj. One known Aborigonal man from the Derrinallum clan (or Teerinyillum Gundidj) was known as "King Tom of the Mount Elephant tribe". He was painted by Robert Hawker Dowling in 1856 (National Library of Australia). King Tom was later photographed at Coranderrk Aboriginal Mission in 1877 by the photographer Fred Kruger (1831-1888).

Colonial exploration of the Derrinallum district began in 1837 by the "Derwent Company". The company comprised Messrs, Learmonth, Fisher, Mercer, and Swanston. They headed north from Lake Corangamite, climbed the volcanic cone of Mount Elephant, and named the mountain "Elephant Hill". The first official overland trip from Geelong to Portland was led by Fyans and Smythe in 1839, where Fyans recorded "we bend our steps across to Teron Allum Hill or elpephant". On the same trip Smythe recorded that June 2 they "started early for Lake Colac... and the native pointed out a hill to which we travelled, the name of the Mount is Terrinallum" Derrinallum was also known as The Swamp by early colonial settlers. The local indigenous tribe called the locality Djerrinallum meaning sea swallow or tern, a species that used to flock to the area in abundance.

An application to build a general store set the ball rolling with the townsite being surveyed in 1866. In 1867 the village of Tooliorook was proclaimed and the first land sales were held in the nearby town of Camperdown. The Post Office opened on 7 December 1868 but was named Tooliorook until 1873. Unhappy with the name of the budding township the residents applied for a name change. The options were Derrinallum, Tarrinallum, Dunwall or Dunstone.. The post office changed its name to Derrinallum in 1873 to match the new name of the town. Growth of the town was slow; by the time of Federation there were only seven dwellings in the town. The town's war memorial doesn't have any names from WW1. The arrival of the railway in 1913 preceded the soldier settlements of the 1920s. The arrival of the returned soldiers lead to the formation of the RSL and the placement of the war memorial. Prior to WW2 the population of the town jumped from 69 to 155 residents.

On 14 January 1944, a bushfire that started in Vite Vite aided by strong northerly winds destroyed the town. Only 12 buildings remained standing after the fire. The devastation and subsequent rebuilding of the town is notable for all the post war style architecture, including the All Saints' Anglican Church.

More land was available for soldiers returning from WW2, these soldiers with their families helped swell the numbers in the district and aided the growth in the town and the services it could provide.

== Community ==
Derrinallum features a FoodWorks supermarket, which includes a hardware store, nursery and newsagency. Also within the town are a post office, a fish and chip shop (Derri Takeaway), a pub, a motel, a Shell service station, two mechanics, a library, a Red Cross shop, a rural supplies business and a cafe. The town had an ANZ Bank until it closed in November 2014.

Derrinallum P12 College is a co-educational state school in the town. The school is constantly having new students arrive and settle into the community.

The main street also hosts a war memorial, history rooms and community information centre called DISC, which is also the local Centrelink resource centre.

Over summer, running from October to March, the town hosts a country farmer's market on the third Sunday of the month.

Close to town are the Deep Lake and Lake Ettrick, both of these lakes host a variety of sporting and social activities.

The local Country Fire Authority (CFA) in Derrinallum has a variety of equipment, including two fire trucks. It is part of the CFA Lismore group and District 06.

The town, in conjunction with neighbouring township Lismore, has an Australian Rules football team, Lismore-Derrinallum, competing in the Mininera & District Football League.

=== Crime ===
On 12 April 2014, Derrinallum became the centre of Australia's biggest explosives clean up, after a local, Glenn Sanders, (also known as 'The Colonel'), an explosives expert and professional mechanic, detonated explosives in his house. Two Police officers were seriously hurt. The blast rocked the town and was heard over 15 km away. The incident left Derrinallum isolated for a number of weeks, including the busy Easter and Anzac Day weekends.

== See also ==
- Ettrick
- Larra
- Mount Elephant (homestead)
