= Brie Brie =

Historic homestead in Victoria, Australia

- Location in Southern Grampians Shire, Victoria
- 37°43′26″S 142°29′46″E
- Type: Homestead, associated built facilities and grounds
- Location: Glenthompson, Victoria, Australia
- Nearest city: Ararat

History
- Built: ~1925

Site notes
- Architectural style: American Bungalow

Victorian Heritage Register
- Official name: Brie Brie Homestead Complex
- Type: State heritage (built and natural)
- Designated: 1 January 2002
- Reference no.: 23415

Brie Brie is a historic pastoral property and homestead near Glenthompson, Victoria, Australia. Located on the plains surrounding Lake Repose in Victoria's Western District, the property originated as part of one of the district's earliest pastoral runs and has remained in continuous agricultural use since the 1840s. The estate is notable for its association with the development of the Western District wool industry, its collection of surviving nineteenth- and twentieth-century pastoral buildings, and its rare private cemetery containing the graves of several generations of owners and station workers. The property is listed on the Victorian Heritage Register.

== History ==
The origins of Brie Brie can be traced to the Green Hill Creek pastoral run, which was occupied in 1840 by Charles Gray, William P. Scott and John Marr. Covering more than 42,000 acres around Lake Repose, the run formed part of the rapid pastoral expansion that followed European settlement of Victoria's Western District. Stocked with approximately 15,000 sheep, Green Hill Creek was among the large grazing enterprises that transformed the volcanic plains of western Victoria into one of Australia's most important wool-producing regions.

By the mid-1840s the original partnership had begun to dissolve. William Scott withdrew from the enterprise and in 1849 the run was formally divided into two equal portions. John Marr retained the northern section, which became known as "Burrie Burrie" (alternatively "Burril Burril"), while Charles Gray took the southern section, later known as "Nareeb Nareeb". The two properties developed side by side and would remain closely associated throughout their histories.

Marr occupied Burrie Burrie until his death in 1858. Evidence of this earliest phase survives in the form of a stone-and-timber cottage located in the north-eastern section of the homestead complex. The building, later used as a shearers' kitchen, is believed to date from the nineteenth century and may be the earliest surviving dwelling on the property. Marr himself was buried at Brie Brie, and the private cemetery also contains the grave of his infant daughter Rossie, who died in 1855. Plantings from this time include Atlas cedar, monkey puzzle, and Cape honeysuckle trees.

Following Marr's death, the property passed briefly to his executors before being acquired in December 1863 by John Sanderson and Company, a pastoral partnership linked to the Scottish wool-trading centre of Galashiels. The purchase represented on of the relatively uncommon examples of direct British capital investment in Victoria's pastoral industry. During this period the property acquired the name Brie Brie, replacing the earlier Burril Burril. According to later accounts, the name was derived from the Sanderson family's home district in Scotland.

The Sanderson period marked a significant phase of development. A new homestead was constructed in 1863 and extensive freehold acquisitions expanded the estate beyond its original pre-emptive right. By the mid-1860s Brie Brie encompassed approximately 21,000 acres and supported a flock of similar size. The property became one of several Western District stations controlled by the Sanderson partnership, which also held neighbouring pastoral interests.

=== Murray ownership ===
Control of the property gradually passed to the Murray family from the end of the 1860s, who were related to the Sandersons through marriage. Over the following decades Brie Brie developed a reputation as a highly-successful wool-growing and stud-breeding property. Management focused not only on wool production but also on the breeding of high-quality Merino sheep. Considerable sums were invested in stud stock, and sheep bred at Brie Brie won championships at major agricultural exhibitions. Rams from the station were sold throughout Australia, while its wool consistently achieved premium prices on the market.

By the 1880s the station had reached a high point of prosperity. Contemporary accounts recorded more than 18,000 sheep being shorn annually, with up to twelve shearers employed during the season. Wool was transported by rail to Geelong and marketed as some of the finest fleece wool produced in Victoria. The station's reputation for stud breeding was enhanced through the acquisition of notable rams, including animals descended from the celebrated Wanganella stud.

The homestead complex also expanded during this period. Buildings erected to support station operations included stables, a coach house, a barn, a manager's residence and numerous service structures. One particularly unusual surviving building is a bluestone salthouse used for preserving meat.

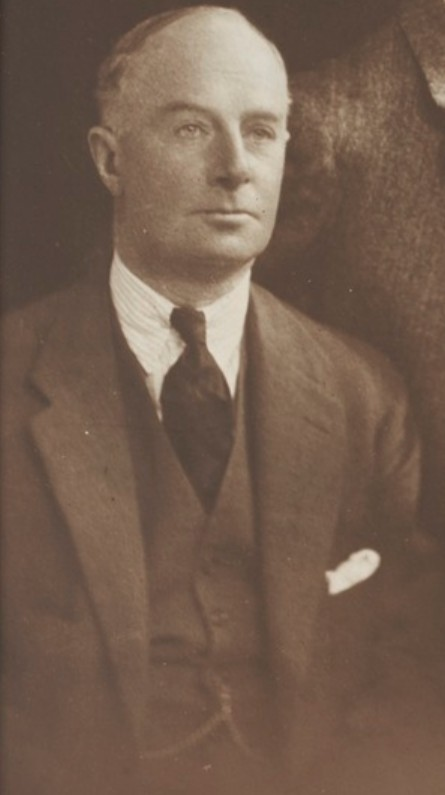
John Hutchinson Murray (1873–1935)

In 1895 John Hutchinson Murray established a nine-hole golf course on the property. At a time when golf was still relatively uncommon in Australia, the course was regarded as one of the few private golf courses in Victoria. Portions of the course are believed to survive within the broader landscape of the estate.

Fire played a recurring role in the history of Brie Brie. The homestead built in 1863 was destroyed in 1891 and replaced by another residence. That house was itself lost in 1924 when a fire reportedly began in a chicken incubator and spread to surrounding buildings. Following the destruction of the earlier homestead, John Hutchinson Murray commissioned the construction of the present residence. Completed in the mid-1920s, the new house was designed in the American Bungalow style, with a distinctive attic room, broad verandahs and extensive service wings. The building was carefully positioned to maintain the traditional orientation towards Mount William, a feature shared by earlier homesteads on the site.

=== Mann ownership to present ===
The Murray family's association with Brie Brie formally ended on 1 April 1936, when the property was purchased by Ian and Audrey Mann. The estate then comprised approximately 3,500 acres. During the early years of their ownership the property faced significant rabbit infestations, with thousands of rabbits trapped and removed in a matter of months, with a Norwegian rabbiter, known as Mr. Jorgensen, able to catch 4,000 within the first four months. Over subsequent decades, neighbouring land was acquired, increasing the size and productivity of the holding.

Under the Mann family, Brie Brie remained a major grazing property while adapting to changing agricultural conditions. The estate continued to support substantial Merino flocks and also incorporated cropping. Extensive tree-planting programs transformed sections of the landscape, particularly through the introduction of numerous oak species, including Algerian oaks, cork oaks, and holm oaks. The property became known for its avenues, shelter belts and gardens, while the rose garden surrounding the homestead was designed to function both as an ornamental feature and as a firebreak.

The homestead complex survived a series of major bushfires during the twentieth century, including fires in 1939, 1944 and 1977. Despite these events, the principal building remained intact and the estate retained a remarkable degree of integrity. Today the complex comprises the surviving nineteenth-century cottage, the 1920s homestead, manager's residence, stables, coach house, barn, salthouse, woolshed, men's quarters, wool classer's hut and private cemetery.

Ian and Audrey Mann died within 12 days apart of each other in 1998, and the property has since been under the ownership of Ted and Jane Mann. Their property, alongside Larra, which they use as an "outstation", Doonaree and Bakers Bridge Farm forms part of the "Glenthompson Pastoral Company".

The property offers employment for jackaroos/jillaroos and backpackers, and has seen people from across Australia, as well as New Zealand, England, Scotland, Canada, Germany, France, Ireland, Belgium, Iceland, the US, Zimbabwe, Finland and Chile.

== See also ==
- Larra
