= Ettrick (homestead) =

Historic homestead in Victoria, Australia

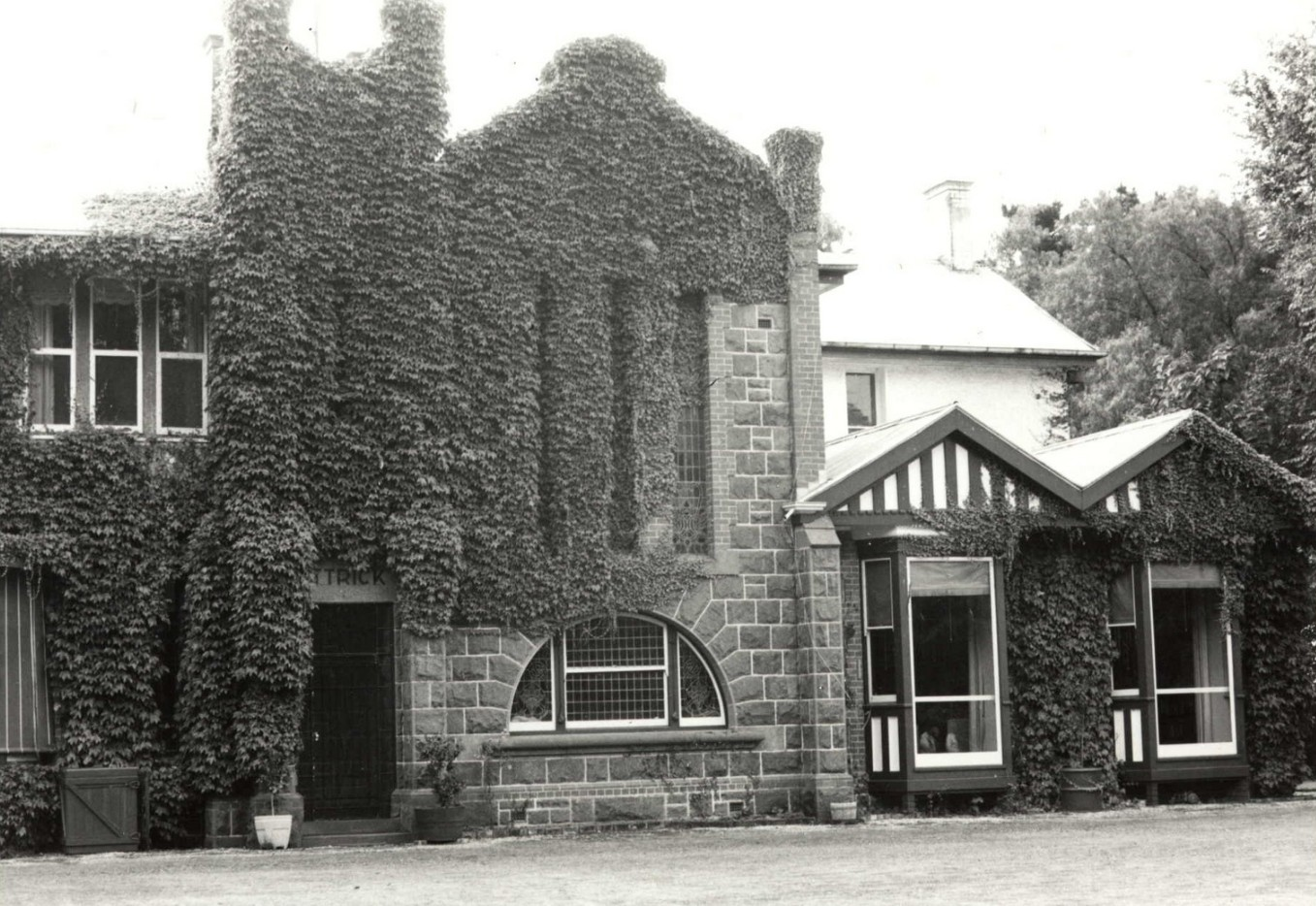
- Ettrick Homestead, 1972

- Location in the Corangamite Shire, Victoria
- 37°59′26″S 143°15′17″E
- Type: Homestead, associated built facilities and grounds
- Location: Derrinallum, Victoria, Australia
- Nearest city: Colac

History
- Built: 1901
- Built for: Charles Sibbald Currie

Site notes
- Architect: Sydney Smith and Ogg
- Architectural style: Art Nouveau

Ettrick is a historic pastoral property and homestead near Derrinallum and Lismore in western Victoria, Australia. Built in 1901, the property was associated with the Currie family and later underwent several periods of subdivision and changing ownership. Its homestead is particularly notable for its unusual combination of architectural styles and its surviving Art Nouveau interior, regarded as one of the finest of its type in Victoria.

== History ==
Ettrick was originally part of a series of runs, including Gala and Larra, originally held by John Lang Currie. In 1898, after his death, Ettrick was given to his son, Charles Sibbald Currie. After studying at Brasenose College at Oxford University, United Kingdom, studying a Bachelor of Laws and subsequently practising there and in Australia, he returned to Ettrick and gave up law in 1894 to become a grazier like his father. The estate was managed at different periods by employees including G. Grey Smith, under whom experiments with lucerne cultivation were undertaken, and Thomas Steddart, who remained associated with Ettrick until his death in 1925.

The property narrowly escaped a serious bushfire in January 1908, after a honeysuckle tree was struck by lightning, nearly igniting the dry grass surrounding it. The fire was promptly discovered and extinguished.

A major change occurred in 1908, when approximately 4,000 acres of Ettrick were sold by Sibbald Currie for £16 an acre to W. Lenehan and P. H. Lock of Warrnambool, who planned to break the property into smaller dairy farms. Their proposed closer-settlement scheme included the construction of houses and cowsheds and the establishment of a butter factory.

Charles Sibbald Currie died in 1924, and was survived by his widow Estelle Murray Currie, and daughters Norah Mabel Sibbald Currie and Estelle Margaret Sibbald Currie. Estelle Murray Currie later died in 1943.

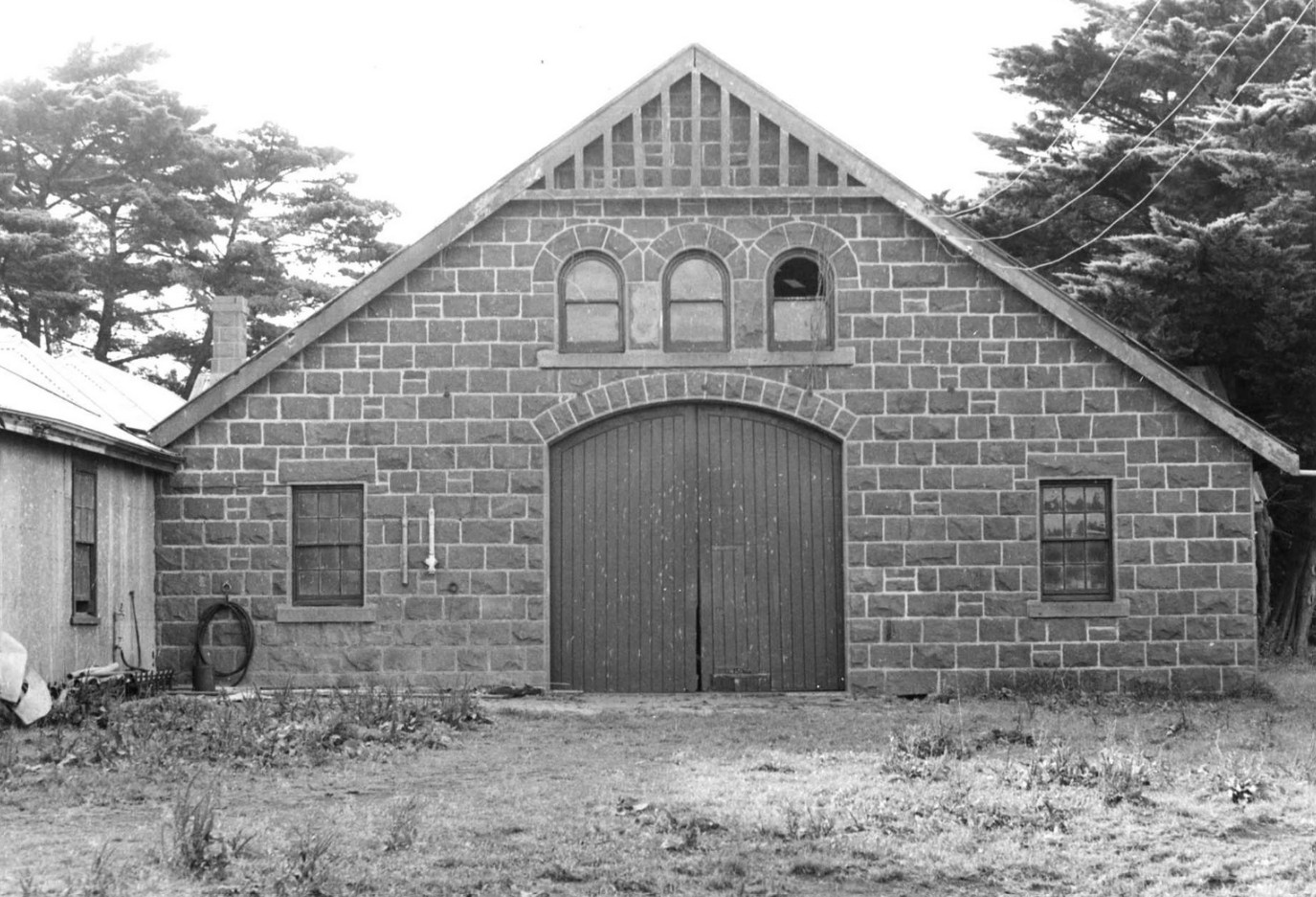
The stables

Despite this earlier subdivision, Ettrick continued to operate as a substantial rural property during the following decades. In September 1925, a large organised rabbit hunt was conducted on the property involving 45 shooters, 10 assistants and three packs of dogs. A total of 3,248 rabbits were killed during the event.

Further subdivision followed after the Second World War. In 1948, Ettrick was acquired by the Soldier Settlement Commission alongside the nearby Larra estate, with the land intended to be divided into farms for returned servicemen and used primarily for dairying.

The remaining Ettrick homestead property, comprising approximately 1,438 acres, was offered for sale in 1950. By the mid-1950s, the property was owned by S. E. "Stan" Gleeson, who remained its owner into the 1960s. The property later remained with the Gleeson family, with Alistair and Caroline Gleeson being the latest owners and once operating a bed and breakfast from the historic homestead.

Agriculture has continued at Ettrick into the modern period. While farming the property's rocky terrain, Alistair Gleeson developed a specialised mower blade system after conventional mowing equipment repeatedly sustained damage, subsequently developing his own double-jointed disc-mounted blade design.

== Description ==
The present Ettrick homestead was designed in 1901 by Melbourne architects Sydney Smith and Ogg, with architect and designer Robert Haddon acting as a consultant and preparing the drawings. The house was deliberately conceived to appear as though it had developed through additions made over an extended period rather than as a single newly constructed building. This effect was achieved through an irregular composition and the use of contrasting materials including brick, bluestone, roughcast render and timber.

The principal facade is dominated by the entrance and stair hall, which are expressed externally through an unusual central composition incorporating a large semicircular arched window and three narrow windows above. An adjoining brick tower introduces a stronger Art Nouveau character through terracotta detailing and an elaborate finial characteristic of Haddon's architectural work. The resulting exterior combines Romanesque, Mannerist and Art Nouveau influences with an intentionally picturesque design.

While much of the interior is comparatively restrained, the stair hall contains an unusually elaborate concentration of Art Nouveau decoration. The staircase crosses the main volume of the hall and incorporates a distinctive geometric screen beneath its landing, while timber screens above the landing doors contain finely perforated Art Nouveau patterns. Exposed ceiling beams divide painted and stencilled decorative panels, and the ground-floor fireplace retains and elaborate curved metal hood.

The stair hall's three tall windows contain coloured glass featuring highly stylised organic imagery, including dark insect-like forms connected by tendrils to radiant sun motifs. These features, together with decorative timberwork, painted surfaces and metalwork, make Ettrick an important surviving example of Art Nouveau domestic design in Victoria.

== See also ==
- Larra
