= Larra (Victoria) =

Historic homestead in Victoria, Australia

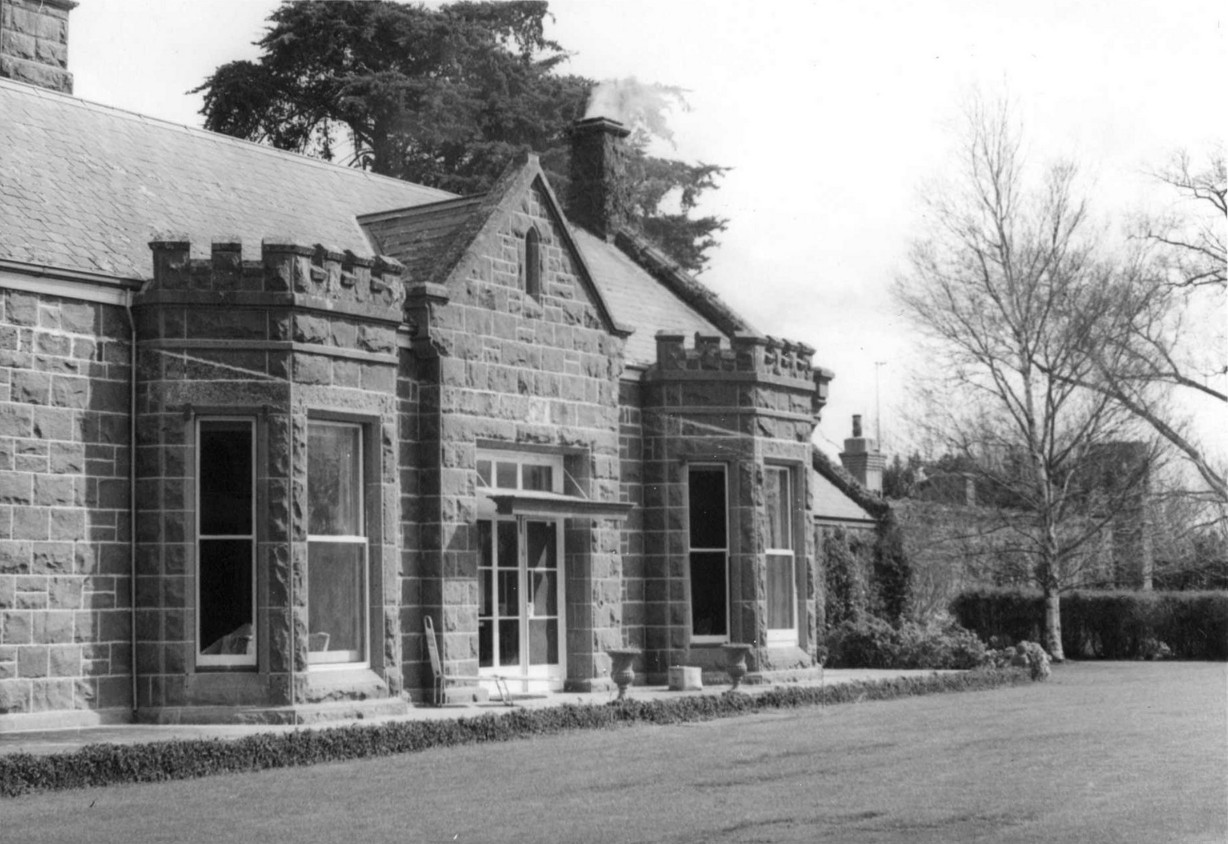
- Larra Homestead

- Location in Corangamite Shire, Victoria
- 38°00′48″S 143°12′47″E
- Type: Homestead, associated built facilities and grounds
- Location: Derrinallum, Victoria, Australia
- Nearest city: Colac

History
- Built: 1873 (bluestone stables), 1875 (house)
- Built for: John Lang Currie

Site notes
- Architect: George Henderson
- Architectural style: Victorian Gothic

Victorian Heritage Register
- Official name: Larra Homestead
- Type: State heritage (built and natural)
- Designated: 9 October 1974
- Reference no.: HO74

Larra is a historic pastoral homestead and sheep station located outside the town of Derrinallum, on the southern side of Mount Elephant in western Victoria, Australia. Established in 1844 by Scottish pastoralist John Lang Currie and his business partner Thomas Anderson, the property developed into one of the largest and most prominent merino sheep enterprises in the Western District. The present bluestone homestead was designed in 1875 by architect George Henderson. Over the course of the nineteenth century, Larra became associated with large-scale pastoral expansion, merino sheep breeding, and the growth of the Victorian wool industry.

== History ==
In 1844, 25-year-old Scottish immigrant John Lang Currie travelled on horseback from Melbourne to Brown's Water Holes (present-day Lismore), after hearing that grazing rights over a large pastoral run on the southern flank of Mount Elephant were available for purchase. The colony was experiencing drought conditions at the time, but Currie remained determined to secure the property for himself and his business partner Thomas Anderson, a fellow Scot and former school friend.

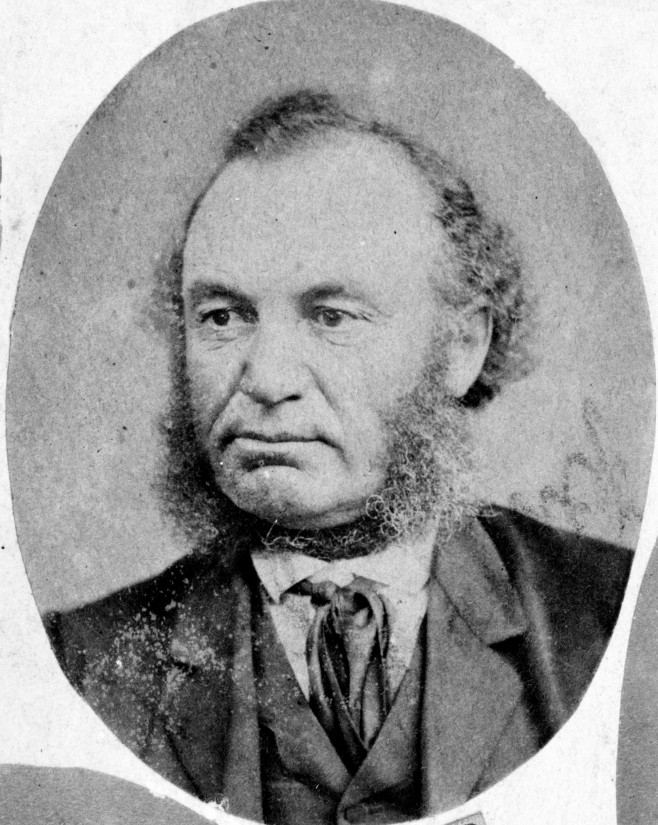
John Lang Currie

The run had previously been held by James Kinross, who had received the lease through Crown Lands Commissioner Foster Fyans. Prior to Kinross, John Brown held the run. Upon arriving, Currie discovered that Kinross had already granted an option to another prospective purchaser, Duncan Hoyle. The option was due to expire at midday the following day. Hoyle failed to arrive before the deadline and, after a further grace period, Currie and Kinross agreed to the sale. Currie later recalled that Hoyle eventually appeared after suffering a riding accident, but arrived too late to complete the purchase.

Currie and Anderson acquired the right of run over approximately 32,000 acres, together with sheep, livestock, working equipment and several simple stone structures. In the early years of settlement the two men lived in a hut beside a natural spring depression where lay below the surface. Following the end of the drought, the spring began flowing freely and the hut site became waterlogged, prompting construction of a new hut on higher ground. Currie later erected a cairn of bluestone from the remains of the original dwelling.

The partnership between Currie and Anderson ended in 1850 following Anderson's marriage. Anderson eventually went on to partner with Ebenezer Oliphant and buy Wooriwyrite. Two years later Currie married Louise Johnston and became sole owner of Larra. A modest bluestone house was erected on the property and a larger woolshed was constructed in 1860. During the Victorian gold rush, labour shortages affected pastoral properties throughout western Victoria as many workers departed for the goldfields. Currie travelled to Melbourne after learning of the arrival of the immigrant ship "Marco Polo", rowing out to the anchored vessel and recruiting several recently arrived Scottish migrants to work at Larra. Some reportedly remained employed on the property for decades.

By the 1860s, Currie had established a merino stud at Larra and the property expanded significantly over the following decades. Additional pastoral holdings, including Titanga and Gala, were acquired as Currie built a large grazing empire across western Victoria and beyond. By the mid-1890s he reportedly owned around 80,000 acres of freehold land carrying approximately 100,000 sheep, while also holding pastoral interests in New South Wales and Queensland. Currie gave the 5,000 acre property Poligolet to manager John Dodds, a loyal acquaintance of Currie's, who resisted the lure of the goldfields and persevered alongside him through hardships on the property. Larra's merino rams were exported throughout Australia as well as internationally, including to South Africa and the United States.

Currie also became known for extensive rabbit eradication efforts undertaken during the nineteenth century rabbit plague. In the 1870s, over an eighteen-month period, teams working on one paddock reportedly killed around 19,000 rabbits. By 1885, inspections suggested rabbit numbers on the same land had been dramatically reduced.

Around 1870, Currie commissioned Scottish-born architect George Henderson to design a new homestead for the property. Constructed of local bluestone, the residence became the centrepiece of the estate. Steam-driven shearing machinery was introduced at Larra in 1891, modernising operations at the station.

On 24 April 1894, the jubilee of Larra was celebrated. Currie, who at the time had recently recovered from an illness whilst based at Titanga, travelled over to Larra, where he met his family and his old friends Peter McArthur and Thomas Shaw, who oversaw Currie add a new inscription to the original hut cairn, commemorating the day.

Later in life, Currie moved to the Melbourne suburb of St Kilda, where he resided in a house known as "Eildon". He died in 1898. Ownership of the family's pastoral properties was subsequently divided among his children, with the eldest child, daughter Henrietta, inheriting Titanga, and his son, also called John Lang Currie, inheriting Larra.

Following World War I, approximately 3,600 acres of Larra were resumed by the Soldier Settlement Commission and subdivided into small farming allotments. In 1944, a major bushfire swept down Mount Elephant and destroyed the property's woolshed, hut and several other buildings, although the homestead and stables survived. During the fire, Currie's granddaughter Inez Thornthwaite reportedly drove her car into one of the property's springs to escape the flames.

After World War II, further subdivisions reduced the estate to a homestead block of approximately 1,375 acres. In 1947, after more than a century of ownership by the Currie family, the remaining property was sold to Tim McKellar. Ownership later passed to Ralph Laidlaw, who reacquired a number of neighbouring soldier-settler blocks and enlarged the holding to more than 2,000 acres.

In 1973, Larra was purchased by Graeme and Jill McKinnon. Another major bushfire extensively damaged the property in 1977. In 1984, Ted and Jane Mann acquired Larra after their previous property near Terang was affected by bushfire. During the late twentieth century, the Mann family expanded the property through the purchase of additional land, increasing its area to approximately 4,000 acres. As of 2015, the property remained and occupied and operated by members of the Mann family in conjunction with their grazing enterprise at Brie Brie, near Dunkeld.

== See also ==
- Brie Brie
- Ettrick
- Gala
- Poligolet
