= John Lang Currie =

Australian pastoralist

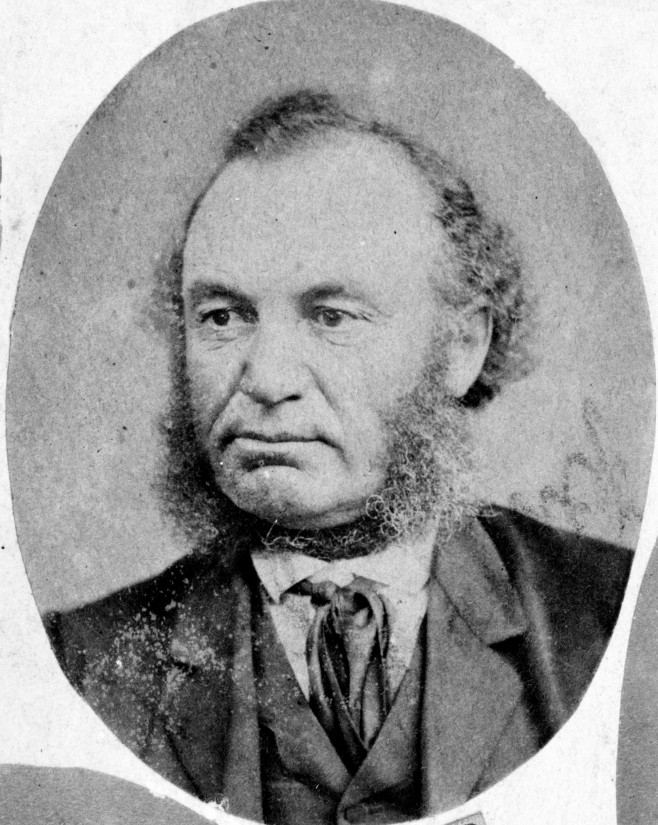
John Lang Currie

John Lang Currie (17 November 1818 – 11 March 1898), Australian pastoralist, was born in Selkirkshire, Scotland, and migrated to the Port Phillip district (later Victoria in 1841. By borrowing money from his family he was able to buy the 129.50 km^{2} Larra run near Camperdown in the Western District, and 1500 sheep, for 750 pounds. In 1844 he began his stud with Saxon merinos from Van Diemen's Land, then bought sheep from John Macarthur's flock at Camden, New South Wales. After a difficulty start he prospered as a sheep breeder and wool-grower.

== Perfect Wool ==
In the 1860s Currie established the "Larra lustre" breed of merino sheep. Within ten years the success of the Larra lustre wool made him both rich and famous. In London a bale of Larra wool was declared "perfect" by English wool-buyers. By 1881 Currie could get five guineas a head for his rams. Currie's rams were sold for high prices all over Australia, in South Africa and the United States. In the 1880s Currie was one of the best merino breeders in Australia.

The 1862 Land Act, which opened the squatters' land up to small farmers, threatened to ruin Currie and other of his class. But he had enough capital to beat the intention of the act, which was to break up his estates. He bought the 68.80 km^{2} Titanga estate in 1886 and the 80 km^{2} Gala estate in 1889. By the mid-1890s he owned 323.75 km^{2} of freehold land, in an area acknowledged to be the finest sheep country in the world, on which he ran 100,000 sheep. Currie also had pastoral interests in New South Wales and Queensland. He also went into textile manufacturing, becoming chairman of the Victorian Woollen and Cloth Manufacturing Co.

Unlike other Western District pastoralists, Currie had no interest in politics, and declined several invitations to stand for the Victorian Legislative Council, which was dominated by landowners. He was a justice of the peace and an elder of the Presbyterian Church of Australia. He gave large sums to Presbyterian charities. He was a sponsor of the Skipton Sheep Show and a fellow of the Royal Geographical Society.

== Personal life ==
Currie lived either on his estates or in Geelong until the 1870s, but in 1871 he moved to Melbourne and built Eildon Mansion in Grey St, St Kilda, where he lived until his death in 1898. He left an estate of 479,000 pounds, a huge sum at that time. He was married to Louise Johnston and had five sons and three daughters.

He was a keen book collector and built up a substantial library at Larra. In 1901, one of his daughters presented his 800 volume collection of Australiana to Ormond College library at the University of Melbourne. This collection later found its way into the State Library of Victoria where it is now housed in the La Trobe Rare Book Collection.
