= List of East India Company directors =

The following list of East India Company directors is taken from the "Alphabetical List of Directors of the East India Company from 1758 to 1858", compiled by C.H. & D. Philips and published in the Journal of the Royal Asiatic Society, October 1941. This list has been compiled from manuscript records, in particular the Court Minutes and Home Miscellaneous Series, volume 764, at the India Office, amplified and checked by information mainly taken from the "Annual Register, the Asiatic Annual."

== How to read the list ==
"The figures indicate the year of election to the Court of Directors and unless the name of the month in any particular year is given, the month is assumed to be that of April. It is important to remember that throughout the period the year of office was from April to the following April. When a span of years is shown the election dates given are inclusive."

"An asterisk placed after a year indicates that the director concerned was elected deputy chairman for that year, two asterisks, that he was chosen chairman, three, that he was first elected deputy and later in the same year appointed chairman. The abbreviations d., disq., respectively stand for died, disqualified.

== List of directors ==
Directors of the British East India Company 1758–1858
Director's name	Dates of directorship	died
Agnew, Patrick Vans	May 1833, 35–8, 40–2	June 1842
Alexander, Henry	March 1826–26, 28–31, 33–36, 38–41, 43–46, 48–51, 53	January 1861
Alexander, Du Pré	August 1820–22, 24–72, 29–32, 34–37, 39	August 1839
Allan, Alexander	1814–17, 19–20	October 1820
Amyand, George	1760, 63	August 1766
Astell, William	January 1800–1800, 02–05, 07–09*–10**, 12–15, 17–20, 22–23*–24**–25, 27–28**–29–*30**, 32–35, 37–40, 42–45	March 1847
Astell, John Harvey	July 1851, 52–58.	
Atkinson, Richard	Jan 1784–84–85	May 1785
Baillie, John	May 1823, 25–28, 30–33	May 1833
Bannerman, John Alexander	1808–11, 13–16, disq. Mar 1817.	August 1819
Baring, Francis	1779–82, 84–87, 89–91*–92**, 94–97, 99–1802, 04–07, 09–10	September 1810
Baron, Christopher	1759, 61–64, 66–67	November 1767
Barrington, Fitzwilliam	1759, 61–62, 65–67.	September 1772
Barwell, William	1753–56, 58–59, 61–64, 66.	November 1769
Bayley, William Butterworth	July 1833–35 37–39*–40**, 42–45, 47–50, 52–58	May 1860
Bebb, John	Nov 1804, 06–09, 11–14, 16*–17**–19, 21–24, 26–29, disq. Apr 1830.	
Becher, Richard	1775–78, 80, disq. Mar 1781.	November 1782
Bensley, William	Oct 1781–84, 86–89, 91–94, 96–99, 1801–04, 06–09	December 1809
Boddam, Charles	1769, 72–75, 77–80, 82–d. 84	November 1784
Boehm, Edmund	1784–7	August 1822
Booth, Benjamin	1767–70, 72–73, 75–78, 80–83	August 1807
Bootle, Robert	1741–44, 46–49, 52–53, 55	May 1758
Bosanquet, Jacob (1)	1759	June 1767
Bosanquet, Jacob (2)	Aug 1782–83, 85–88, 90–93, 95–97*–98**, 1800–02*–03**, 05–08, 10*–11**–12**–13, 15–18, 20–23, 25–26, disq. Mar 1827.	July 1828
Bosanquet, Richard	1768–69, 71–72.	April 1809
Boyd, John	1753–56, 58, 59*, 60–61, 63–64	January 1800
Browne, John	1757–60, 62–63	
Bryant, Jeremiah	Feb 1841–41, 43–45	June 1845
Burges, John Smith	1773, 74, 76–79, 81–84, 86–89, 91**–92*–94, 96–99, 1801–03	April 1803
Burrow, Christopher	1735–38, 40–43, 45–48, 50–53, 55–58, 60–61	July 1766
Burrow, Robert	1762–64	August 1793
Campbell, Archibald M.	Feb 1796–96	September 1796
Campbell, Robert	Jul 1817, 19–22, 24–7, 29–30*–31**–32, 34–37, 39–42, 44–47, 49–52	1858
Carnac, James Rivett	Mar 1827–28, 30–33, 35*–36**–37**–38, disq. Dec 1838	January 1846
Caulfeild, James	1848–51	November 1852
Chambers, Charles (1)	1755–57, 63–66, 68	March 1776
Chambers, Charles (2)	1770, 73	
Chauncey, Richard	1737–40, 42–45, 1747**–48*–49**–50*, 52**–53*–54*	March 1760
Cheap, Thomas	Aug 1777–78, 80–83, 85–88, 90-95	December 1794
Clarke, William Stanley	Mar 1815–15–16, 18–21, 23–26, 28–31, 33–34*–35**–36, 38–41, 43	January 1844
Clerk, Robert	Jul 1812, 14–15	July 1815
Cockburn, James	1767–68, 70–71	July 1804
Colebrooke, George	1767, 68*, 69**, 70**, 72**	August 1809
Cotton, John	Apr 1833–33–34, 36–39, 41–42*–43**–44, 46–49, 51–53	July 1860
Cotton, Joseph	1795–98, 1800–03, 05–08, 10–13, 15–18, 20–23, disq. May 1823	January 1825
Crabb-Boulton, Henry	1753–56, 58–61, 63, 64*, 65**, 67, 68**, 69, 70, 72, 73**	October 1773
Creed, James	1758, 61	February 1762
Creswicke, Joseph	1765–68	June 1772
Cruttenden, Edward Holden	1765–68, 70–71	June 1771
Cuming, George	1764–67, 69–72, Dec 73, 74–77, 79–82, 85–87	November 1787
Currie, Frederick	1854–56, 57*, 58**	September 1875
Cust, Peregrine	1767, 68, 69*	January 1885
Cutts, Charles	1749–52, 58–61, 63–66.	
Daniell, James	Oct 1809, 11–14, 16–19, 21–24, resigned Apr 1825	
Darell, Lionel	1780–83, 85–88, 90–93, 95–98, 1800–d. 3 Oct	October 1803
Davis, Samuel	Oct 1810–12, 14–17, 19	July 1819
Dempster, George	1769, 72	February 1818
Dent, William	Jan 1851–51–53	December 1877
Dethick, Thomas	1772	
Devaynes, William	1770–73, 74–75, 77*–89*–80**, 82–83*–84*–85**, 87–88*–89**–90*, 92–93**–94**–95, 97–1800, 02–05, defeated Apr 1807	November 1809
Dorrien, John	1755–58, 60, 61, 62*, 63**	December 1784
Drake, Roger	1738–41, 43–46, 48–51*, 53*–54**–55**–56, 58*	June 1762
Du Cane, Peter	1750–53	March 1803
Du Cane, Peter	1764, 66–69, 71–73	June 1822
Dudley, George	1757–60, 62, 64, 65*, 66**, 67, 70, 71*	November 1777
Dupre, Josias	1765, 66	October 1780
Eastwick, William Joseph	Jun 1847, 49–52, 54–8*.	
Edmonstone, Neil Benjamin	Oct 1820–2, 24–7, 29–32, 34–7, 39–41	June 1841
Ellice, Russell	Feb 1831, 32–5, 37–40, 42–5, 47–50, 52*–3**, 54–8. 1873	
Elphinstone, William Fullarton	Dec 1786–9, 91–4, 96–9, 1801–04**,06**–09,11–13*–14**, 16–19, 21–4, resigned Apr 1825	May 1834
Ewer, Walter	Dec 1790–Apr 91, 92–4, disq. Apr 1795	July 1810
Farquhar, Robert Townsend	Mar 1826–26–28	March 1830
Fergusson, Robert Cutlar	Feb 1830–30–31, 33–5, disq. Jun 1835.	
Fitzhugh, Thomas	Aug 1785, 87–90, 92–5, 97–9	January 1800
Fletcher, Henry	1769, 71–75, 77–80, 82***–83**, resigned Nov 1783	March 1807
Fonnereau, Zachary Philip	1753–54	August 1778
Forbes, John	Apr 1830, 31–34, 36–9	February 1846
Fraser, Simon	Feb 1791–91, 93–96, 98–1801, 03–06	May 1810
Freeman, William George	1769, 74–76, 78–81	
Galloway, Archibald	Sep 1840, 42–45, 47–48*–49**–50	April 1850
Gildart, Richard	1759	January 1771
Godfrey, Peter	1734–37, 39–42, 44–47, 49–52, 54–55**–56*–57, 59**, 60 July 1769	
Gough, Charles	1749-52, 54–57, 59–62	February 1774
Grant, Charles	May 1794–95, 97–1800, 02–04–*05**, 07*–08*–09**–10, 1215**, 17–20, 22–23	October 1823
Gregory, Robert	1769–72, 75–78, 80–82**, resigned Aug 1782.	September 1810
Hadley, Henry	1757–60, 62–65	March 1771
Hall, Richard	1773, 74, 76–79, 81–94, 86, d. Dec 1786	November 1786
Harrison, John	1758–61, 63–66, 68–71, 73*, 74*–75**–77, 79–82	August 1794
Harrison, Samuel	1759, 61–62	May 1765
Hawkesworth, John	Apr 1773–Nov 73	November 1773
Hogg, James Weir	Sep 1839–42, 44–45*–46**–47, 49–50*–51*–52**, 54–58	May 1876
Hudleston, John	1803–06, 08–11, 13–16, 18–21, 23–35, disq. Mar 1826.	
Hunter, John	1781–84, 86–89, 91–94*, 96–99, 1801–02	December 1802
Hurlock, Joseph	1768, 70–73	August 1793
Impey, Michael	1736-39, 41–44, 46–49, 51–54, 56-57	June 1794
Inglis, Hugh	1784–7, 89–92, 94–96*–97**, 99*, 1800**–02, 04–07, 09–11*–12*	August 1820
Inglis, John	May 1803–04, 06–09, 11–14*, 16–19, 21–22	August 1822
Irwin, James	Apr 1795, 97	May 1798
Jackson, John	1807–10, 12–15, 17–20	June 1820
Jackson, William Adair	Jan 1803–03–04	November 1804
James, William	1768–71, 73, 74–76*, 78*–79**–80–81*, 83	December 1783
Jenkins, Richard	Jun 1832–5, 37–38*–39**–40, 42–45, 47–50, 52–53	December 1853
Johnstone, George	Jan 1784–84–85	May 1787
Jones, Robert	1754–57, 65–68	February 1774
Lascelles, Peter	1770, 72–75	1776
Law, Stephen	1746-49, 51–54, 56	December 1787
Le Mesurier, Paul	1784–7, 89–92, 94–7, 99–1802, 04–05	December 1805
Lindsay, Hugh	1814–17, 19–22, 24–26*–27**, 29–32, 34–37, 39–42, 44	May 1844
Linwood, Nicholas	1749-52, 54	May 1773
Loch, John	1821–24, 26–28*–9**, 31–33**–34, 36*–39, 41–44, 46–49, 51–53	February 1868
Lumsden, John	Jan 1817, 18	December 1818
Lushington, James Law	Jul 1827–28, 30–33, 35–37*–38**, 40–41*–42**–43, 45–47*–48**, 50-53	May 1859
Lushington, Stephen	1782–85, 87–89*–90**, 92–95**, 97–98*–99**–1800, 02–05	January 1807
Lyall, George	1830–33, 35–38, 40*–41**–43, 45–48, 50, disq. Jan 1851	September 1853
Mabbott, William	1741-44, 46–49, 51–54, 56	November 1764
Macnaghten, Elliot	Jun 1842–3, 45–48, 50–53, 54*, 55**, 56–58	September 1810
Mangles, Ross Donnelly	1847–50, 52–3, 54, 55, 56*, 57**, 58	August 1877
Manship, John	1755–58, 62–65, 67, 69–72, Dec 73, 74–77, 79–82, 84–87, 89–92, 94–97, 99–1802, 04–07, 09, disq. May 1809	November 1816
Marjoribanks, Campbell	1807–10, 12–15, 17–18*–19**20, 22–24*–25**, 27–30, 32*–33**–35, 37–40	September 1840
Marjoribanks, Dudley Coutts	1853	March 1894
Masterman, John	Nov 1823–5, 27–30, 325, 37–40, 42–45, 47–50, 52–53.	
Melville, William Henry Leslie	Jul 1845–6, 48–51, 53–55.	
Metcalfe, Thomas Theophilus	1789–92, 94–97,9 9–1802, 04–07, 09–12	November 1813
Michie, John	1770–75, 77–80, 83–86**, 88*	November 1788
Millet, George	Jan 1806–06–07, 09–12	1812
Mills, Charles (1)	Aug 1785–6, 88–91, 93–96, 98–1801 ***, 03–06, 08–11, 13–14, disq. Mar 1815.	January 1826
Mills, Charles (2)	Aug 1822–24, 26–29, 31–34, 36–39, 41–44, 46–49, 51–58	1872
Mills, William	1778–81, 83–85, disq. Aug 1785.	March 1820
Moffat, James	1774–7, 79–82, Dec 1784–85, 87–90	October 1790
Money, William	1789–92, 94–5	February 1796
Money, William Taylor	Dec 1818, 20–23, 25, disq. Mar 1826.	
Moore, James Arthur	May 1850, 52–53, d. Jul 1860.	
Morris, John	1814–17, 19–22, 24–7, 29–32, 34–7, disq. Jan 1838.	
Motteux, John	1769, 1784–86*–87**	April 1893
Muspratt, John Petty	Mar 1824, 25–28, 30–33, 35–38, 40–43, 45–48, 50–53	August 1855
Newnham, Nathaniel	1738-41, 43–46, 48–51, 53–56, 58	September 1778
Oliphant, James	Jan 1844–44–46, 48–51, 53*, 54**, 55–56, disq. Apr 1857	1881
Pardoe, John	1765–68	October 1798
Parry, Edward	Apr 1797–97–98, 1800–03,0506*–07**–08**, 10–13, 15–18, 20–23, 25–27	3 July 1827
Parry, Richard	Aug 1815–17	July 1817
Parry, Thomas	Oct 1781, 83–86, 88–91, 93–96, 98–1801, 03–06	April 1816
Pattison, James	Mar 1805, 06–09, 11–14, 16–17*–18**–19, 21*–22**–24, 26–27*–29, disq. Apr 1830.	
Pattle, Thomas	1787–90, 92–94, disq. Apr 1795	August 1818
Payne, John	1741-44, 46–47, 49–52, 54–56*–57**	August 1764
Peach, Samuel	1773–74, 76–79, 81, disq. Oct 1781	December 1790
Peel, Laurence	1857	July 1884
Phipps, Thomas	1742-45, 47–50, 52–55, 57-58	1776
Pigou, Frederick	1758–61, 63–66, 68–71, 73–77	November 1792
Plant, Henry	1745-48, 50–53, 55-58	November 1784
Plowden, Richard Chicheley	1803–06, 08–11, 13–16, 18–21, 23–6, 28–29	February 1830
Plowden, William Henry Chicheley	1841–44, 46–49, 51–53	March 1880
Pollock, George	1854–55, 58	October 1872
Prescott, Charles Elton	Jun 1820, 22–25, 27–30, 32	June 1832
Prinsep, Henry Thoby	Jul 1850–1, 53–58	February 1878
Purling, John	1763–66, 68–69, 70*, 71**, 77–80	August 1800
Raikes, George	Mar 1817, 18–21, 23–26, 28–31, 33–36, disq. Jul 1836.	
Ravenshaw, John Goldsborough	Jul 1819–22, 24–27, 29–31*–32**, 34–37, 39–40	June 1840
Rawlinson, Henry Creswicke	1856–58	March 1895
Raymond, John	1757–60	September 1780
Raymond, Jones	1734-37, 39–42, 44–47, 49–52, 54-57	March 1768
Reid, Thomas	Nov 1803, 05–08, 10–13, 15*–16**–18, 20*–21**–23	March 1824
Rider, William	1738-41, 43–46, 48–51, 53-54	March 1855
Robarts, Abraham	Mar 1786–86, 88–91, 93–96, 98–1801, 03–06, 08–11, 1315, disq. Oct 1815.	November 1816
Roberts, John	1764–66, 67–70, 71–72, 75*–76**–78, Nov 80–83, 85–88, 90–93, 95–98, 1800–01*–02**–03*, 05–08	February 1810
Robertson, Archibald	Jun 1841–42, 44–47	June 1847
Robinson, George Abercrombie	1808–11, 13–16, 18–19*–20**–1, 23–5*–6**, 28, disq. Mar 1829.	
Rooke, Giles	1758–60, 61–64	December 1790
Rous, Thomas	1758, 60*, 61*, 62**, 64**, 65, 66*, 67**, 70–71	June 1771
Rous, Thomas Bates	1773, 74, 76–79.	February 1799
Rumbold, Thomas	1772, 75–77, resigned Aug 1777	November 1791
Saunders, Thomas	1765–66, 67*	October 1775
Savage, Henry	1755–58, 60–62, 64–67, 70–77, 79–82	March 1785
Scott, David (of Dunninald)	Dec 1788–91, 93–95*–96**, 98–1800*–01**, resigned Apr 1802	November 1805
Scott, David (2)	1814–17, 19–20, disq. Aug 1820	July 1872
Scrafton, Luke	1765–68	
Seward, Richard	1759, 61–63.	March 1764
Shank, Henry	1831–34, 36–39, 41–44, 46–49, 51–53.	
Shepherd, John	Jun 1835–6, 38–41, 43*–44**–46, 48–49*–50**–51**, 53–58	January 1859
Smith, George	Apr 1795, 97–1800, 02–05*, 07–10, 12–15, 17–20, 22–5, 27–30, 32–3, disq. Jul 1833.	December 1836
Smith, Martin Tucker	Dec 1838, 40–43, 45–48, 50–58	October 1880
Smith, John (see Burges, John Smith)
Smith, Joshua	1771–72	March 1819
Smith, Nathaniel	1774–75, 77–80, 82*–83***–84**–85*, 87*–88**–90, 92–94	May 1794
Smith, Richard	1759–62, 64	December 1782
Smith, Samuel	1783–86, disq. Jul 1786.	June 1793
Snell, William	1762–64, 67–69.	January 1789
Sparkes, Joseph	1773–74, 76–79, 81–84, 86–89	February 1790
Stables, John	1774–76, 78–81, disq. Oct 1781.	January 1795
Steevens, George	1758–60, 62, 63	June 1763
Stephenson, John	1765–68	April 1794
Stuart, James	1826–9, 31–2	April 1833
Sulivan, Laurence	1758**, 60**, 61**, 63*, 64, 69, 71, 72*, 78–80*–81**, 83–85	February 1786
Sykes, William Henry	Jul 1840–42, 44–47, 49–52, 54–55*–56**–58	June 1872
Tatem, George	1772–74, 76–79, 81–84, Jul 1786, 88–91, 93–96, 98–1801	July 1807
Taylor, John Bladen	Jan 1810, 11–14, 16–19	1819
Thelusson, George Woodford	Sep 1796–7, 99–1802, 04–07	December 1811
Thornhill, John	Oct 1815–16, 18–21, 23–26, 28–31, 33–36, 38–40	February 1841
Thornton, Robert	Dec 1787–88, 90–93, 95–98, 1800–03, 05–08, 10–13** disq. Apr 1814.	March 1826
Thornton, William (1)	1759, 61–64.	April 1801
Thornton, William (2) (see Astell, William Thornton)
Toone, Sweny	Mar 1798–98–1800, 02–05, 07–10, 12–15, 17–20, 22–25, 27–30, disq. Feb 1831.	
Townson, John	Mar 1781, 81–83, 85–88, 90–93, 95–96	March 1797
Travers, John	1786–89, 91–94, 96–99, 1801–04, 06–09	September 1809
Tucker, Henry St. George	1826–29, 31–33*–34**, 36–39, 41–44, 46*–47**–49, 51	June 1851
Tullie, Timothy	1750-53, 55–58, 60–63	August 1765
Turner, Whichcott	1742-45, 47–50, 52-55	November 1780
Twining, Richard	1810–13, 15–16, disq. Jan 1817	1824
Vansittart, Henry	1769	1770
Verelst, Harry	1771	October 1785
Vivian, John Hussey	1856–58.	
Walpole, Hon. Thomas	1753-54	March 1803
Walton, Bourchier	1759, 60–62, d. Jun 1779.	June 1779
Ward, Edward	1762, d. Sep 1762.	September 1762
Warden, Francis	Jul 1836, 38–41, 43–46, 48–50, disq. Jul 1850.	
Warner, Richard	1760–63.	April 1775
Wartalop, Charles	1769, 72, 73, 74–75, 77–80, 82–84	December 1784
Waters, Thomas	1759–62	September 1764
Webber, William	1762–65	April 1779
Western, Maximilian	1755-57	April 1764
Wheler, Edward	1765–68, 70–72–73**, 74**–76.	October 1784
Whiteman, John Clarmont	May 1844–7, 49–52	August 1866
Wier, Daniel	1768–73, 74–76	November 1781
Wigram, William	May 1809–12, 15–18, 20–22*–23**, 25–28,30–3*, 35–38, 40–43, 45–48, 50–53	1858
Wilberforce, William	1753–54	1777
Wilkinson, Jacob	1782–3, resigned Nov 1783	May 1791
Williams, Robert	1809–12, d. Jul 1812	July 1812
Williams, Stephen	Mar 1790, 91–94, 96–99, 1801–04	March 1805
Willock, Henry	Jan 1838, 39–42, 44*–45**–47, 49–52, 54–58	1858
Willoughby, John Pollard	1854–8	September 1866
Willy, William	1746-49, 51-54	May 1765
Winter, James	1737-40, 42–45, 47–50, 52-54	January 1756
Wombwell, George	1766–68, 75–77**–78**, 80, d. Nov 1780	November 1780
Woodhouse, John	1768–71, 73–76, 78–81, Jan 1784–84–86, 88–90, disq. Feb 1791	August 1792
Young, William	Mar 1829–29–31, 33–36, 38–41, 43–46	

== List of chairmen and deputy chairmen since 1714 ==
Prior to 1714 the Chairman and Deputy Chairman were appointed at each meeting of the Court.

Year	Chairman	Deputy Chairman
1714	Sir Charles Peers (Kt.)	Robert Child
1715	Sir Robert Child (Kt.)	Josias Wordsworth
1716	Sir Gregory Page, Bt.	Henry Lyell
1717	Josias Wordsworth	Henry Lyell (2nd time)
1718	Henry Lyell	Sir Robert Nightingale, Bt
1719	Sir Robert Nightingale, Bt	William Dawsonne
1720	William Dawsonne	Sir Matthew Decker, Bt
1721	Henry Lyell (2nd time)	Thomas Heath
1722	Josias Wordsworth (2nd time)	Joseph Herne
1723	Josias Wordsworth (3rd time)	Edward Harrison
1724	Edward Harrison	Abraham Addams
1725	Sir Matthew Decker, 1st Baronet	Henry Lyell (3rd time)
1726	Henry Lyell (3rd time)	John Gould
1727	John Gould	Josias Wordsworth (2nd time)
1728	Josias Wordsworth (4th time)	Edward Harrison (2nd time)
1729	Edward Harrison (2nd time)	Sir Matthew Decker, 1st Baronet (2nd time)
1730	Sir Matthew Decker, 1st Baronet (2nd time)	Josias Wordsworth (3rd time)
1731	Sir Matthew Decker, 1st Baronet (3rd time)	Edward Harrison
1732	Sir Matthew Decker, 1st Baronet (4th time)	Josias Wordsworth (4th time)
1733	Josias Wordsworth (5th time)	John Gould (2nd time)
1734	Josias Wordsworth (6th time)	Abraham Addams
1735	Josias Wordsworth (7th time)	Sir William Billiers (Kt.)
1736	Sir William Billiers (Kt.)	Harry Gough
1737	Harry Gough	Josias Wordsworth (5th time)
1738	Josias Wordsworth (8th time)	Sir William Rous (Kt.)
1739	Sir William Rous (Kt.)	Samuel Feake
1740	Samuel Feake	Harry Gough (2nd time)
1741	Harry Gough (2nd time)	Sir John Salter (Kt.)
1742	Sir John Salter (Kt.)	Harry Gough (3rd time)
1743	Harry Gough (3rd time)	Samuel Feake (2nd time)
1744	Samuel Feake (2nd time)	Dodding Bradyll
1745	Dodding Bradyll	Harry Gough (4th time)
1746	Harry Gough (4th time)	Samuel Feake (3rd time)
1747	Harry Gough (5th time)	Richard Chauncey
1748	Richard Chauncey	Dodding Bradyll (died Jan. 1748/9)
1749	William Baker	Richard Chauncey (2nd time)
1750	Richard Chauncey (2nd time)	Harry Gough (5th time)
1751	Roger Drake	William Baker
1752	William Baker (2nd time)	Richard Chauncey (3rd time)
1753	Richard Chauncey(3rd time)	Roger Drake
1754	Roger Drake (2nd time)	Richard Chauncey (4th time)
1755	Roger Drake (3rd time)	Peter Godfrey
1756	Peter Godfrey	John Payne
1757	John Payne	Laurence Sulivan
1758	Laurence Sulivan	Roger Drake (2nd time)
1759	Peter Godfrey (2nd time)	Sir John Boyd, Bt.
1760	Laurence Sulivan	Thomas Rous
1761	Laurence Sulivan	Thomas Rous (2nd time)
1762	Thomas Rous	John Dorrien
1763	John Dorrien	Laurence Sulivan
1764	Thomas Rous (2nd time)	Henry Crabb-Boulton
1765	Henry Crabb-Boulton	George Dudley
1766	George Dudley	Thomas Rous (3rd time)
1767	Thomas Rous (3rd time)	Thomas Saunders
1768	Henry Crabb-Boulton (2nd time)	Sir George Colebrooke, Baronet
1769	Sir George Colebrooke, Baronet	Peregrine Cust
1770	Sir George Colebrooke, Baronet	John Purling
1771	John Purling	George Dudley (2nd time)
1772	Sir George Colebrooke, Bt.	Laurence Sulivan
1773	Henry Crabb-Boulton (died October 1773) (3rd time) replaced by Edward Wheler	Edward Wheler replaced by John Harrison
1774	Edward Wheler (2nd time)	John Harrison (2nd time)
1775	John Harrison	John Roberts
1776	John Roberts	William James
1777	George Wombwell (later Sir George Wombwell, Bt.)	William Devaynes
1778	George Wombwell (2nd time)	William James (2nd time)
1779	Sir William James, Bt.	William Devaynes (2nd time)
1780	William Devaynes	Laurence Sulivan
1781	Laurence Sulivan	Sir William James, Bt.
1782	Robert Gregory	Henry Fletcher
1783	Sir Henry Fletcher, Bt.	Nathaniel Smith
1784	Nathaniel Smith	William Devaynes (3rd time)
1785	William Devaynes (2nd time)	Nathaniel Smith (2nd time)
1786	John Michie	John Motteaux
1787	John Motteaux	Nathaniel Smith (3rd time)
1788	Nathaniel Smith (3rd time)	John Michie
1789	William Devaynes (3rd time)	John Michie
1790	Stephen Lushington	William Devaynes (4th time)
1791	John Smith Burges	Francis Baring
1792	Francis Baring	John Smith Burges
1793	William Devaynes (4th time)	Thomas Wartalop
1794	William Devaynes (5th time)	John Hunter
1795	Sir Stephen Lushington, Bt. (2nd time)	David Scott
1796	David Scott	Hugh Inglis
1797	Hugh Inglis	Jacob Bosanquet
1798	Jacob Bosanquet	Sir Stephen Lushington, Bt. (2nd time)
1799	Sir Stephen Lushington, Bt. (3rd time)	Hugh Inglis (2nd time)
1800	Hugh Inglis (2nd time)	David Scott (2nd time)
1801	David Scott (2nd time)	Charles Mills
1802	John Roberts (2nd time)	Jacob Bosanquet (2nd time)
1803	Jacob Bosanquet (2nd time)	John Roberts (2nd time)
1804	Hon. William Fullarton Elphinstone	Charles Grant
1805	Charles Grant	George Smith
1806	Hon. William Fullarton Elphinstone	Edward Parry
1807	Edward Parry	Charles Grant
1808	Edward Parry (2nd time)	Charles Grant
1809	Charles Grant (2nd time)	William Astell
1810	William Astell	Jacob Bosanquet (3rd time)
1811	Jacob Bosanquet (3rd time)	Sir Hugh Inglis, Bt. (3rd time)
1812	Sir Hugh Inglis, Bt. (3rd time)	Robert Thornton
1813	Robert Thornton	Hon. William Fullarton Elphinstone
1814	Hon. William Fullarton Elphinstone	John Inglis
1815	Charles Grant (3rd time)	Reid, Thomas
1816	Reid, Thomas	John Jebb
1817	John Jebb	James Pattison
1818	James Pattison	Campbell Marjoribanks
1819	Campbell Marjoribanks	George A.Robinson
1820	George A.Robinson	Reid, Thomas (2nd time)
1821	Reid, Thomas (2nd time)	James Pattison (2nd time)
1822	James Pattison (2nd time)	William Wigram
1823	William Wigram	William Astell (2nd time)
1824	William Astell (2nd time)	Campbell Marjoribanks (2nd time)
1825	Campbell Marjoribanks (2nd time)	Sir George A. Robinson, Bt. (2nd time)
1826	Sir George A. Robinson, Bt. (2nd time)	Hon. Hugh Lindsay
1827	Hon. Hugh Lindsay	James Pattison (3rd time)
1828	William Astell (3rd time)	John Loch
1829	John Loch	William Astell (3rd time)
1830	William Astell (4th time)	Robert Campbell
1831	Sir Robert Campbell, Bt.	John Goldsborough Ravenshaw
1832	John Goldsborough Ravenshaw	Campbell Marjoribanks (3rd time)
1833	Campbell Marjoribanks (3rd time) John Loch (2nd time)	William Wigram (2nd time) Henry St George Tucker
1834	Henry St George Tucker	William Stanley Clarke
1835	William Stanley Clarke	James Rivett-Carnac
1836	Sir James Rivett-Carnac, Bt.	John Loch (2nd time)
1837	Sir James Rivett-Carnac, Bt.	Major-General Sir James L. Lushington, K.C.B.
1838	Sir James L.Lushington	Richard Jenkins
1839	Sir Richard Jenkins, G.C.B.	William B.Bayley
1840	William B.Bayley	George Lyall
1841	George Lyall	Major-General Sir James L. Lushington, K.C.B. (2nd time)
1842	Major-General Sir James L. Lushington, K.C.B. (2nd time)	John Cotton
1843	John Cotton	John Shepherd
1844	John Shepherd	Sir Henry Willock
1845	Sir Henry Willock	James Weir Hogg
1846	James Weir Hogg	Henry St George Tucker (2nd time)
1847	Henry St George Tucker (2nd time)	Major-General Sir James L. Lushington, K.C.B. (3rd time)
1848	Major-General Sir James L. Lushington, K.C.B. (3rd time)	Major-General Archibald Galloway, C.B.
1849	Major-General Sir Archibald Galloway, K.C.B.	John Shepherd (2nd time)
1850	John Shepherd (2nd time)	Sir James Weir Hogg, Bt. (2nd time)
1851	John Shepherd (3rd time)	Sir James Weir Hogg, Bt. (3rd time)
1852	Sir James Weir Hogg, Bt. (2nd time)	Russell Ellice
1853	Russell Ellice	Major James Oliphant
1854	Major James Oliphant	Elliot Macnaghten
1855	Elliot Macnaghten	Col William Henry Sykes
1856	Col William Henry Sykes	Ross Donnelly Mangles
1857	Ross Donnelly Mangles	Sir Frederick Currie, Bt
1858	Sir Frederick Currie, Bt	Captain Eastwick
