= George Boileau Willock =

George Boileau Willock (1832-30 November 1893) was a British Civil Servant in India. He was the third son of Sir Henry Willock. From 1852 to 1854 he attended Haileybury and subsequently arrived in India that same year. He married Georgiana C. M. Willoughby in 1857, and became assistant magistrate and collector at Meerut. He retired in 1866.

Willock died on 30 November in 1893 at Sussex Villas, Kensington.
