= James Oliphant =

Chairman of the British East India Company

Lieutenant-Colonel James Oliphant (1796–1881) was Director and Chairman of the East India Company, and Equerry to the Maharajah Duleep Singh of the Punjab.

== Family background ==
James was the fourth son (of seven children) of Ebenezer Oliphant, 7th of Condie and Mary, third daughter of Sir William Stirling of Ardoch.

One of his brothers was Sir Anthony Oliphant, Chief Justice of Ceylon and accredited with having the first tea plantation in that country. Sir Anthony's son was Laurence Oliphant the famous author, diplomat, politician, lawyer, traveller and mystic. James's eldest brother was Laurence Oliphant, 8th of Condie and 30th Chief of Clan Oliphant who was the Member of Parliament for Perth between 1832 and 1837. A third brother was Thomas Oliphant, artist and musician.

In the nineteenth century, the names of four Oliphants featured repeatedly in the (Hansard) records of the Houses of Parliament. They were the three brothers: Laurence Oliphant; James Oliphant; Sir Anthony Oliphant and also the latter's son, Laurence Oliphant.

Lt. Col. James Oliphant married firstly, at Pudupattinam, 23 July 1822, to Lucy, daughter of George Maidman. James had seven children with Lucy (she died and was buried at Secunderabad, on 29 March 1832). James married secondly at Secunderabad, on 29 March 1832, to Sophia Ann, daughter of General Thomas Truman, of the Madras Army. Sophia and James had thirteen children together (she died 1 June 1897). One of the children was General William Stirling Oliphant of the Bengal Army and another was Arthur Craigie Oliphant, guardian of the children of the Maharajah Duleep Singh. One of Arthur Craigie's children was Sir Lancelot Oliphant, Ambassador Extraordinary and Plenipotentiary to Belgium and Director General of the Foreign Office. Lancelot was married to Christine McRae Sinclair, Viscountess Churchill. Another of James's grandsons (and brother to Sir Lancelot Oliphant) was Rear Admiral Laurence Richard Oliphant, who was married to the Hon. Adelaide Daphne Hermione Willoughby, daughter of the 10th Baron Middleton, who are the grandparents of the present (34th) Chief of the Oliphants.

== E.I.C. career ==
James was a cadet at Addiscombe Military Seminary between 1812 and 5 July 1814 before entering the Madras Engineers.

James Oliphant served at the sieges of Nowah (January 1819) and Copal Droog (May 1819), in both James distinguished himself. Regarding the siege of Copal Droog:

It is true, that from time to time, some very strong-minded man may follow the just rules of the Art, and do his best, without adequate means, in spite of every difficulty, and regardless of the consequences to his own reputation; it is not impossible that an Engineer, acting upon such high-toned principles, may succeed: but instances of this kind are very rare indeed in the history of our Indian Campaigns. In the late war, the Siege of Nowa(h), conducted by Ensign Oliphant, is the only example of this nature; upon which it may be remarked that if that enterprising and skilful officer had been provided with a body of properly trained Sappers and Miners, the place might undoubtedly have been taken in half the time".

In 1825 James was appointed Superintendent Engineer at Hyderabad He retired 17 December 1838. He was a director of the East India Company from 1844 to 1856, Deputy Chairman 1853 and Chairman in 1854.

== Engineering works ==
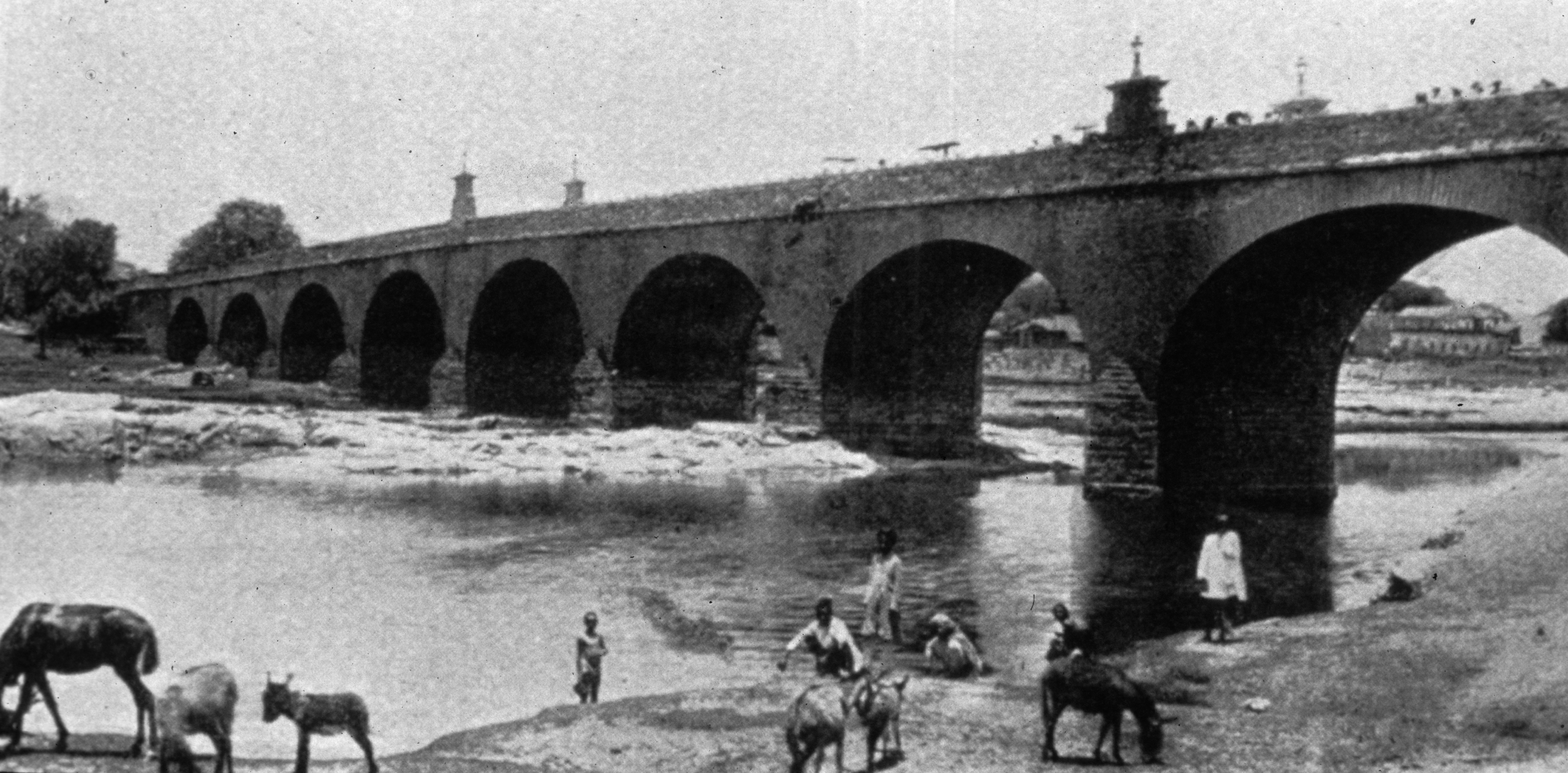
Chaderghat bridge, Hyderabad which was earlier known as Oliphant bridge

Chaderghat is a suburb of Hyderabad. Chaderghat Bridge or Oliphant Bridge was built by Lt.Col. Oliphant during the reign of Nizam Nasir-ud-dawlah. The bridge spans the Musi River and was constructed between 1829 and 1831, for which James received the thanks of the Governor-General.

== Indian causes ==
Oliphant had very independent views of the rights and justices of the Indians under the East India Company's rule and was not scared to stand up for them. In the case of the Raja Pratap Singh, Raja of Satara, there was controversy both in the Court of the East India Company and in Parliament. As Sir James Hogg, 1st Baronet commented in the House of Commons in July, 1848: "Major Oliphant had given an opinion in favour of the Raja's innocence. The fact was, however, that Major Oliphant was the only one out of thirty directors who ever wrote or spoke one word, not merely against the honour, but against the propriety of the conduct of Colonel Ovans." As John Elliot said in the same debate in the House of Commons, the issue brought into question the very integrity of the East India Company's government in Bombay. That the Raja of Satara was badly treated is not a matter of dispute today. In September, 1839 the Raja of Satara was dethroned, banished and stripped of his private property by the H.E.I.C.'s government in Bombay. The Raja had been presented with two choices, either admit to a host of charges, in which case he could retain his position or plead his innocence and be stripped of almost everything that he owned or stood for. Since the charges were concocted by his enemies (whom the British administration chose to stand with and would not give the Raja adequate opportunity to refute) the Raja rightly felt wronged. The Raja's one main ally was the Governor, Sir Robert Grant until the latter's death in July, 1838 - the same year that Oliphant, a fellow Scot retired from active service in India (and whose brother had been a Member of Parliament during the last two years of Grant's time in the House of Commons - 1832 to 1834). Whether there was any direct link between Oliphant and Grant is unknown. That Oliphant's stance in the Satara affair in the 1840s brought controversy to the East India Company and questioned their integrity and that of Col C Ovans, does not seem to have affected Oliphant's career, as five years later he was elected Deputy Chairman and then the following year Chairman of that organisation.

Oliphant's son, Arthur Craigie Oliphant also worked in Hyderabad. He acted as Secretary to the Prime Minister, Sir Salar Jung. A.C.Oliphant was expelled from India by the British Government in India. It had been felt that A.C.Oliphant had been advising Sir Salar Jung on how to outmanoeuvre the Indian Government in negotiations over the restoration of Berar. Whether or not A.C.Oliphant had been over zealous in advising Sir Salar Jung is unknown but from letters written by James Oliphant to Sir Salar Jung it is clear that Col. James Oliphant, in earlier years was working to promote the interests of both Jung and The Nizam of Hyderabad and also advising on strategy.

Oliphant was WM of The St. John's Lodge at Secunderabad for year 1834 & 1835.

== Maharaja Duleep Singh ==
In 1859 James Oliphant was installed as Equerry to the Maharajah Duleep Singh at the recommendation of Sir John Login. This arrangement suited both sides as Oliphant had suffered financially with the disbanding of the East India Company in 1858 and Oliphant was to be a possible replacement should anything happen to the Maharajah's most trusted friend Sir John Login (who did indeed die four years later in 1863).

Preceded by Russell Ellice	Chairman of the East India Company; April 1854–April 1855	Succeeded by Elliot Macnaghten
