= Treaty of Alinagar =

1757 treaty of the British East India Company

The Treaty of Alinagar (also Treaty of Calcutta) was signed on 9 February 1757 between Robert Clive of the British East India Company and the Nawab of Bengal, Mirza Muhammad Siraj ud-Daulah, following the decisive victory of Nawab's troops at the siege of Calcutta. Alinagar was the short-lived name given to Calcutta given by the Nawab after it was captured by him. The Nawab had seized the English fort at Calcutta, but facing the threat of Afghans in the rear and the military might of the English, he signed the treaty.

Based on the terms of the accord, the Nawab would recognize all the provisions of Mughal Emperor Farrukhsiyar's farman of 1717. Moreover, all British goods that passed through Bengal would be exempt from duties. In other tenets of the agreement, the British would not be hindered from fortifying Calcutta, as well as mint coins in Calcutta. The signing of the treaty was one of the events leading up to the famous Battle of Plassey. The Nawab was defeated and killed by Clive and his allies the same year.

== See also ==
- Great Britain in the Seven Years War
- List of treaties
