= Anthony Oliphant =

Chief Justice of British Ceylon from 1838 to 1854

Sir Anthony Oliphant (17 November 1793 – 9 March 1859) was a Scottish lawyer who was the eighth Chief Justice of Ceylon.

== Early life and family ==
Oliphant was born in Forgandenny, Perthshire, the third of seven children of Ebenezer Oliphant of Condie House, and Mary Stirling. He was educated at the preparatory school, Hyde Abbey, near Winchester.

His eldest brother, Laurence Oliphant, 8th of Condie was Member of the House of Commons for Perth, whose son was General Sir Laurence Oliphant KCB KCVO, 9th of Condie. Another of Sir Anthony's brothers, Col. James Oliphant, was chairman of the Honourable East India Company, and a third brother was the artist and composer Thomas Oliphant, who wrote the words of "Deck the Hall(s) with Boughs of Holly", "Men of Harlech", "The Ash Grove" and accomplished many other works, including cataloguing the manuscript music at the British Museum and writing the chorale for the wedding of King Edward VII and Queen Alexandra.

It is unknown whether Oliphant, like his younger brother Thomas, went to the nearby Winchester College. He was admitted to the bar in Edinburgh and then moved to London, where he was called to the Bar at Lincoln's Inn.

== Personal life ==
Oliphant married Catherine Maria Campbell, the daughter of a Colonel Ronald Campbell and Charlotte Johanna Cloete. Their son, Laurence Oliphant, went on to become a well-known author, international traveller, lawyer, and a Member of the House of Commons as his uncle had before him.

== Career ==
After qualifying as a barrister, Oliphant set up practice as an equity (legal) draughtsman.

In 1827, Oliphant was offered the post of attorney general in the Cape Colony. William Menzies had been offered the post first but had turned it down. This was the year when the judicial system in Cape Colony was being reformed. Oliphant was also appointed King's Advocate in the Vice-Admiralty Court. His salary for the two positions amounted to £1,500 per annum. Oliphant sailed to the colony in August 1827 aboard the Sestoris and arrived in mid-October.

Oliphant's duties as attorney general included both prosecutions on behalf of the Crown and also acting in an advisory capacity to the Government.

Oliphant was appointed Chief Justice of Ceylon in October 1838, succeeding Sir William Norris. He was knighted by letters patent in 1839. Sir Anthony lived in Colombo, purchasing a property called 'Alcove,' in Captains Gardens, subsequently known as Maha Nuge Gardens in Colpetty. When the Oliphant family left Ceylon he sold it to Sir Harry Dias.

== Interests ==
Sir Anthony Oliphant's tea estate, the Oliphant Estate, situated in the hill country in Nuwara Eliya, was one of the first estates to grow tea in Ceylon, when thirty plants were smuggled from China.

== Publications ==
- Ceylon Under British Rule, 1795–1932 By Lenox A. Mills (Cass)
