= Jacob Bosanquet =

British merchant (1755-1828)

- Born: 1755; Hamburg
- Died: 30 July 1828 (aged 72–73)
- Occupation: Merchant

Jacob Bosanquet Jr. (1755 – 30 July 1828) was a British merchant who was chairman of the East India Company.

== Life ==
He was born in Hamburg, the son of the merchant Jacob Bosanquet. He became a junior partner in his cousin's firm of Bosanquet & Willermin, silk merchants, for several years before being elected to the Direction of the East India Company in 1782. After serving three terms as a Director, he was elected Deputy Chairman of the company three times (1797, 1802 and 1810) and Chairman of the company, in each of the years 1798, 1803 and 1811).

Bosanquet acquired the manors of Broxbournebury, Hoddesdonbury and Baas. and was pricked High Sheriff of Hertfordshire for 1803–04.

== Family ==
Bosanquet was married 27 September 1790 to Henrietta, daughter of Sir George Armytage, Baronet and had two sons and two daughters. His son George Jacob Bosanquet was also High Sheriff of Hertfordshire.
