= Dodding Bradyll =

Dodding Bradyll (or Braddyll) (1689–1748) was an English politician and businessman.

Born at Conishead Priory, Lancashire, to merchant John Braddyll and Sarah, the daughter of Miles Dodding.

Braddyll was elected unopposed as the Whig MP for Lancaster at the 1715 General Election, though he did not contest at the next election. In 1728, he followed his father and brother in becoming a director of the East India Company, serving as deputy chairman in 1744 and 1748, and as chairman in 1745.

Parliament of Great Britain
Preceded by Robert Heysham; William Heysham	Member of Parliament for Lancaster; 1722–1745; With: William Heysham 1715-1716; William Heysham, junior 1716-1722	Succeeded by Thomas Lowther; William Heysham, junior
