= Richard Chauncey =

British merchant

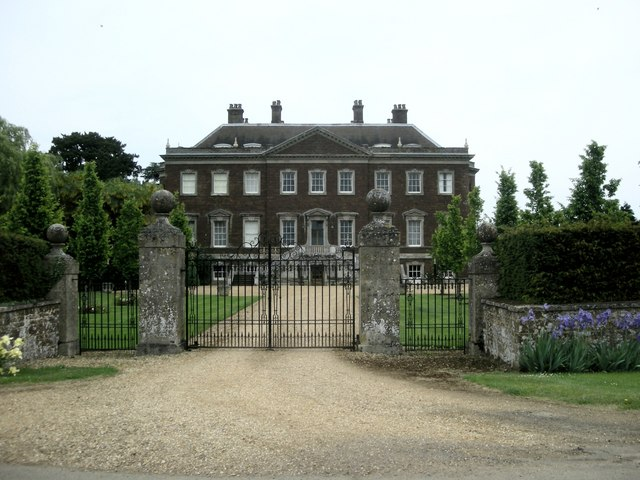
Edgcote House

Richard Chauncey or Chauncy (1690--1760) was a London merchant who was four times the Deputy-Chairman of the East India Company and three times the Chairman.

== Life ==
Chauncey was born into a well-to-do Northamptonshire family which had owned the Edgcote estate in South Northamptonshire since 1543. His father, Richard Chauncy, Sr. (d. 1734), was a Mercer and Freeman of London and the son of Tobias and Bridget Chauncy. Richard, Jr. became a London cloth merchant with an interest in East India merchant ships.

He was also a partner in the business of Chauncey and Vigne, gunpowder merchants. Already owning a gunpowder mill at Oare, Kent, he leased the Kingsmill at Faversham in 1754.

Chauncey was a director of the East India Company from 1737 to 1754. He was made Deputy-Chairman in 1747, 1749, 1752 and 1754 and Chairman in 1748, 1750 and 1753. He died in 1760.

== Legacy ==
In 1742 Chauncey inherited the Edgcote estate and commissioned architect William Jones (died 1757) to build a new mansion. Edgcote House was built between 1747 and 1752 and is now a Grade I listed building.

== Family ==
Chauncey was the maternal uncle of Chauncy Townsend, MP, the son of his sister Elizabeth by her husband Jonathan Townsend. His widow Elizabeth's death was reported in 1762.

His eldest son William married the eldest daughter of Josiah Wordsworth, in 1757. William Henry inherited Edgcote; then on his death without an heir it passed to his sister, Anna Maria.

== See also ==
- List of East India Company directors
