= John Manship =

English businessman (1726–1816)

- Born: 22 July 1726; City of London, England
- Died: 26 November 1816
- Resting place: Stoke Newington, Middlesex, England
- Known for: Directorship of the East India Company
- Spouse: Ann Dowdeswell

John Manship (1726–1816) was an English businessman in the City of London and landowner in Surrey, who for over 50 years was a director of the East India Company.

== Early life ==
Baptised on 4 August 1726 at the church of St Christopher le Stocks in the City of London, he was the first son of John Manship (1695–1749), a cloth merchant and son of the publisher Samuel Manship, and his wife Elizabeth (1706–1788), daughter of Robert Garbrand and his wife Mary Tredcroft.

== Business career ==
At the age of 29, Manship was first elected to the court of directors that controlled the East India Company as an overt supporter of Laurence Sulivan, who led what was called the India Interest. This faction of the board lost its influence with the death of Sulivan in 1786, and Manship then joined the group known as the City Interest. This brought him into conflict with Henry Dundas. As the most senior director, Manship was three times nominated for deputy chair of the company, which would mean that he would then automatically progress to the chair, but the hostility of Dundas ensured he never got the post. However, he did serve on a number of committees including the Secret Committee, the most powerful. In May 1809, when he was aged 82, he was disqualified from further service.

== Landholdings ==
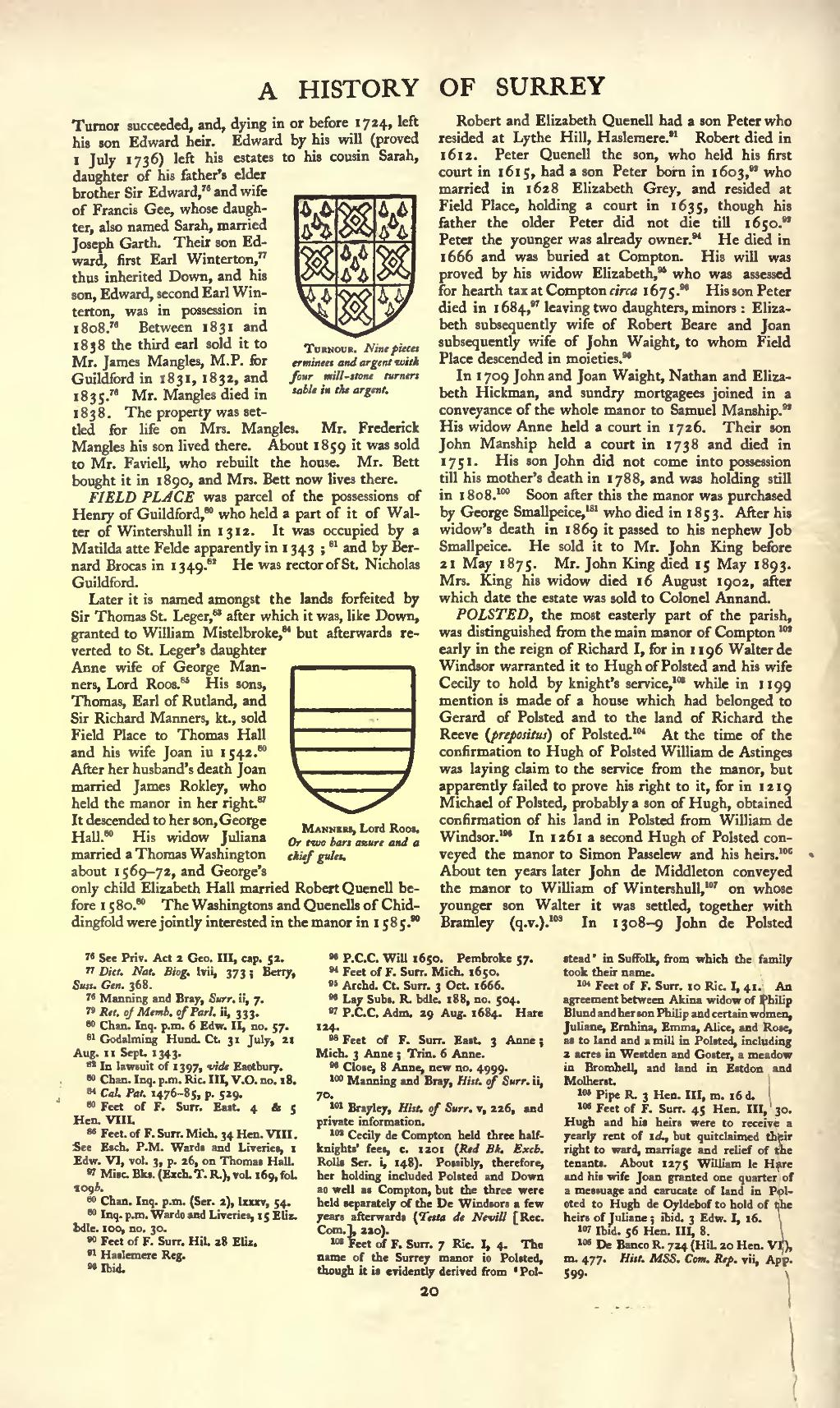
History of Field Place

On the death of his father in 1749, Manship inherited the manor of Biggin and Tamworth in the parish of Mitcham and on the death of his mother in 1788 he inherited the manor of Field Place in Compton. In 1804 he sold Biggin and Tamworth to James Moore, who used it to grow plants for his cosmetics business. Field Place he sold shortly after 1808 to George Smallpeice.

== Death ==
He was buried with his father and mother in the family vault at the church of St Mary in Stoke Newington on 3 December 1816. His holograph will with several codicils was proved on 18 November 1817.

== Family ==
On 12 May 1748 in the church of St Christopher le Stocks he married his first cousin Ann (1727–1777), orphaned daughter of his aunt Elizabeth Manship (1701–1733) and her husband Richard Dowdeswell (1692–1730). They had six children, but five died within days of birth and only Anne Manship (1755–1779) reached adulthood. As sole heiress of a prominent businessman and landowner, she was a desirable match and, still in her teens, in 1772 was persuaded to elope to Flanders by man about town and duellist Simon Goodman Ewart (1752–1812), son of a wealthy distiller and landowner. Eventually both fathers accepted the runaway marriage and after Anne's early death leaving three surviving children, Simon went to work for the East India Company in Bengal. His father-in-law in his will left him only one shilling (0.05 pounds, worth about 3.50 pounds in 2014) and explicitly left nothing to two of his three grandchildren: Anna Maria Ewart (1775–1849), wife of the Reverend George Maximilian Bethune (1772–1840), and her brother John Manship Ewart (1777–1834), who was the husband of Catherine Bethune (1779–1835). Everything went to the third grandchild Elizabeth Ewart (1773–1862), the wife of Robert Norman (1764–1813), (whose diary recently changed hands). Though she had nine children, none had offspring.
