= William Fullerton-Elphinstone =

Scottish director of the East India Company

The Honourable William Fullerton-Elphinstone
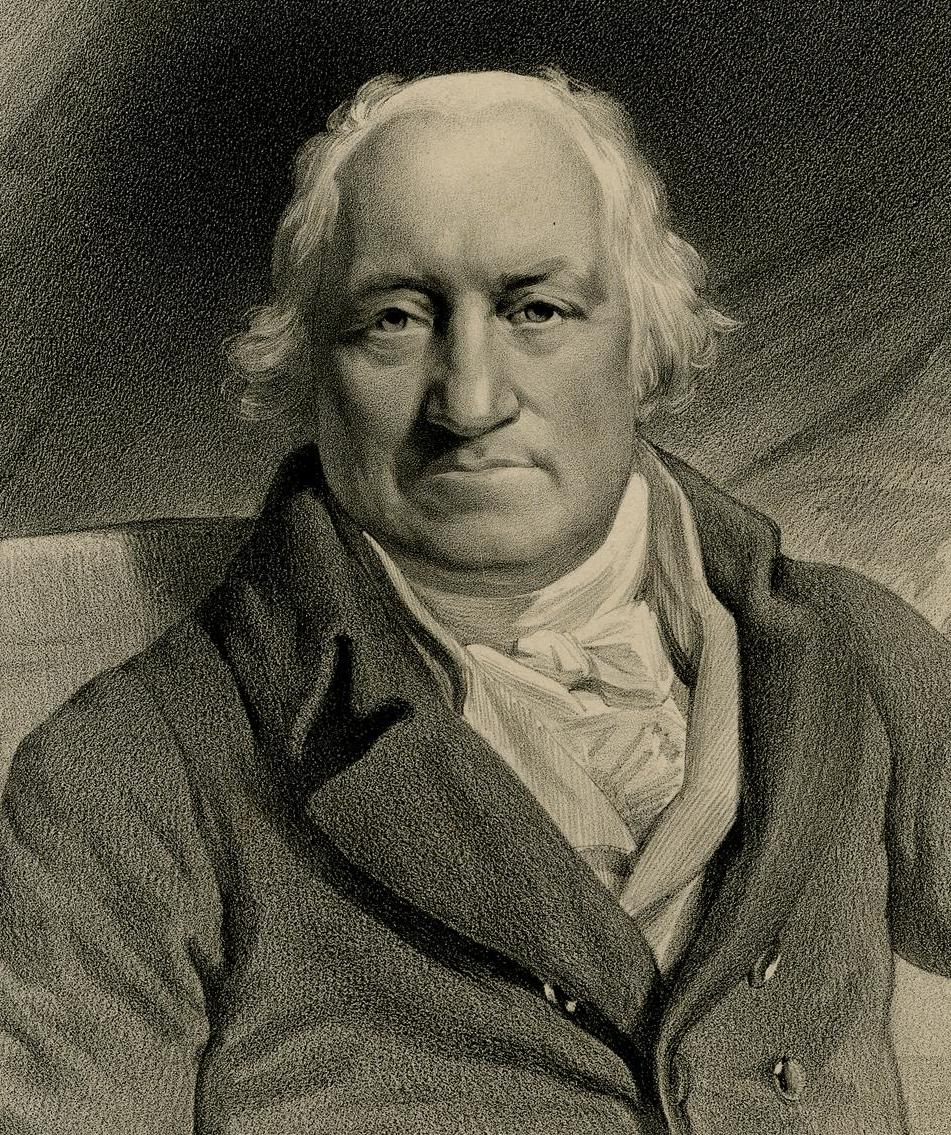

Chairman of the East India Company
- In office 1804–1805; 1806–1807; 1814–1815

Personal details
- Born: William Elphinstone; 13 September 1740 Airth, Stirlingshire, Scotland
- Died: 3 May 1834 (aged 93) Enfield, London, England
- Children: William Elphinstone
- Relatives: George Keith Elphinstone (brother)

William Fullerton-Elphinstone (born William Elphinstone; 13 September 1740 – 3 May 1834) was a Scottish ship's captain for the East India Company who became a director of the company several times between 1786 and 1824, and who served both as deputy chairman and chairman of the company.

== Life ==
He was born William Elphinstone in Stirlingshire, the third son of Charles Elphinstone, 10th Lord Elphinstone, and his wife Lady Clementina Fleming. His younger brother was George Elphinstone, 1st Viscount Keith.

He went to sea at the age of 15 and joined the East India Company's maritime service in 1757. He studied navigation and became a midshipman on the Company ship Winchelsea. He sailed to India and China in 1758–1760 and was made third mate in the Hector and then captain of the Triton, making his final voyage for the Company in 1777.

He afterwards became a director of the company (1786–1789, 1791–1794, 1796–1799, 1801–1804, 1806–1809, 1811–1814, 1816–1819, 1821–1824), and served as deputy chairman of the company in 1813 and as chairman in 1804, 1806 and 1814, retiring in 1825 after a stroke.

He died at Enfield in 1834 and was buried in St Marylebone Parish Church near his London home.

== Family ==
In 1774 he had married Elizabeth, the daughter of William Fullerton of Carstairs and adopted the additional name of Fullerton. His wife was heiress to her uncle John Fullerton of Carberry, to whose estate she succeeded in 1802. They had 4 sons and 3 daughters:

- Clementina (d. 19 November 1830), who married Admiral Pulteney Malcolm on 18 January 1809 and had issue.
- Anne, who died in a carriage accident on 29 August 1850.
- William George Keith Elphinstone (1782 – 24 April 1842), commander of the British Army garrison in Kabul, Afghanistan during the First Anglo-Afghan War. He died as a captive after being captured during the 1842 retreat from Kabul. No issue.
- Elizabeth (1783 – 28 October 1802). No issue.
- John Fullerton (c. 1784 – 12 March 1854), was the Chief Representative of the Honourable East India Company Service in Canton. He had no issue.
- Charles (1784 – c. February 1807), presumably died aboard HMS Blenheim when it disappeared after a strong gale. He had no issue.
- James Drummond Buller-Fullerton-Elphinstone (4 May 1788 – 8 March 1857), who married firstly Diana Maria Clavering (8 June 1801 – 24 December 1821), daughter of Charles J. Clavering on 30 September 1820. He married second Anna Maria Buller, daughter of Sir Edward Buller, 1st Baronet, on 25 February 1824. They had eight children, including William Elphinstone, 15th Lord Elphinstone.
