= John Hunter (British politician) =

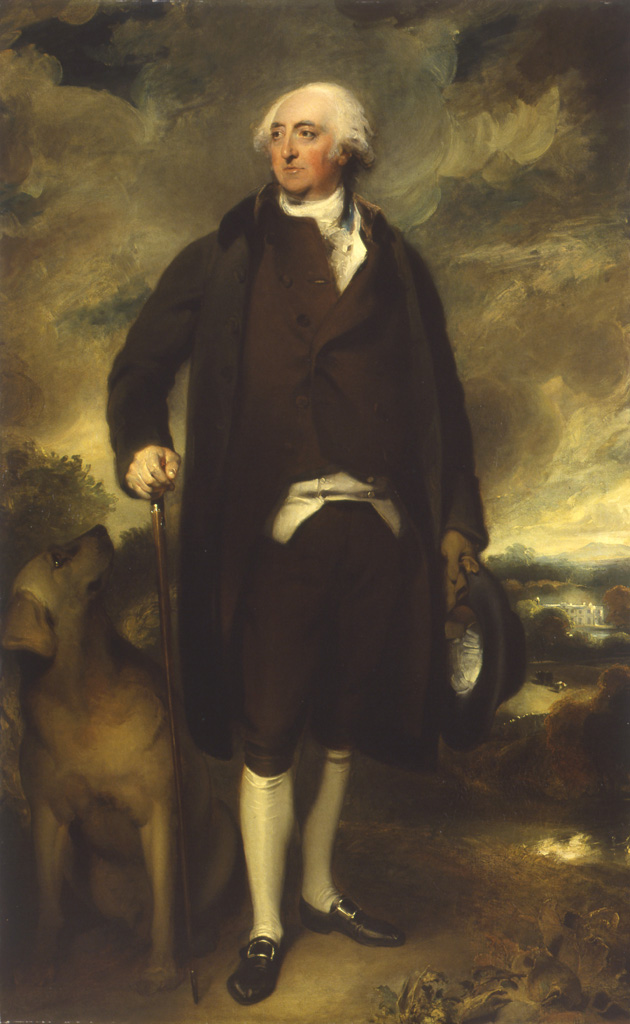
Hunter by Thomas Lawrence, between 1789 and 1790

John B. Hunter (1724 – 16 December 1802) was a British 'nabob' who became wealthy as a result of trading with India, and subsequently went into politics as deputy chairman of the East India Company and as Member of Parliament (MP) for Leominster.

== Foundations of business career ==
Although he had only £100 to his name when he left England, Hunter was said to have enjoyed "long success in trade as a free merchant in the East Indies" which gave him assets of over £100,000. In July 1777 he bought the Gobions or Gubbins Estate, near Potters Bar in Hertfordshire and served in 1780-1 as High Sheriff of Hertfordshire. At Gubbins, Hunter became interested in farming and in fattening Oxen for sale, at which he is reported to have succeeded in turning a profit.

At the 1780 general election, Hunter came forward as an Opposition candidate for the borough of Milborne Port in Somerset. He and his running mate, Temple Luttrell, were defeated by the Northite candidates with Hunter finishing bottom of the poll. In the same year his wife, Anne, died; she was a relative of William Hornby, the Governor of Bombay. It is said that Hunter married again to a "mulatto".

== East India Company ==
In 1781 Hunter first took up the role of Director of the East India Company. The company's rule was that directors served for four years but were not eligible for re-election until the year after their previous term ended, but Hunter was re-elected in 1786, 1791, 1796 and 1801 so he was still on the Board at his death more than 20 years later. His role as a Director made him more influential in politics and in 1783 he was reckoned to be, as one of the Directors influenced by the India traders in the City of London, a supporter of Francis Baring and politically close to Richard Atkinson who was then aligned with William Pitt the Younger in politics.

== MP for Leominster ==
When the Government was preparing for the 1784 general election, Hunter's name was put by George Rose on a list of men for whom seats were to be found; the list specified that Hunter was willing to pay £2,000 and possibly £3,000 for a seat. A seat was indeed found for him at Leominster where he ran in conjunction with Hon. Penn Curzon as supporters of William Pitt the Younger. This time Hunter finished at the top of the poll with 312 votes, followed by Curzon with 308, both well ahead of the Foxite Sir Gilbert Elliott on 171.

Hunter was a supporter of Pitt, including on reform of Parliament in April 1785, but he is only known to have spoken once in debate. This occasion was in March 1793 when he defended the resolutions of the East Indian Committee. In April 1794 he was elected as the Deputy Chairman of the East India Company for the ensuing year. When Pitt's ally Henry Dundas attempted to increase his influence on the East India Company, Hunter was generally supportive of Dundas; and also supported Dundas' nominee as Chairman of the company, David Scott, from 1796.

== Retirement ==
He faced contested re-election campaigns in both 1790 and 1796, topping the poll each time, but the 1796 election cost him more than £2,000 as he paid £5 to each of 402 voters who came to the poll. There were a further 142 voters whom he did not pay, of whom 60 supported him; they were either in debt to him, independently wealthy, or Quakers. Hunter decided to retire a year later, giving up his seat through appointment as Steward of the Manor of East Hendred on 14 June 1797.

On his death in Bath in December 1802, Hunter's estate passed to his granddaughter; her husband then took the surname Hunter, although he sold the estate. Hunter was buried in a family vault in the churchyard at North Mymms.

Parliament of Great Britain
Preceded by Viscount Bateman and Richard Payne Knight	Member of Parliament for Leominster; 1784 – 14 June 1797; With: Hon. Penn Curzon (1784–1790); John Sawyer (1790–1796); George Augustus Pollen (1796–1797)	Succeeded by William Taylor; George Augustus Pollen
