= Laurence Oliphant (Perth MP) =

Laurence Oliphant, 8th of Condie and 30th Chief of Clan Oliphant, (1791 – May 1862) was the member of the United Kingdom Parliament for Perth between 1832 and 1837. He was a Whig and his strong views on reform caused controversy.

== Family background ==
Laurence was the eldest son (of seven children) of Ebenezer Oliphant, 7th of Condie, and Mary, third daughter of Sir William Stirling of Ardoch.

He was also a direct descendant of the sister of Laurence Oliphant the elder Jacobite Laird of Gask. Laurence was christened at Forgandenny, 22 June 1791 married 1stly, on 22 April 1814, to Eliza, 2nd daughter of Hercules Ross, of Rossie Castle, co. Forfar. Eliza died in 1820. He married 2ndly, 23 August 1825, to Margaret Gilles Barrett, widow of Samuel Barrett, of Jamaica, and 3rdly, 19 August 1841, Marianne, eldest daughter of James Stuart Oliphant, of Rossie. Laurence had three children including his son and heir, Major General Sir Laurence James Oliphant, KCB KCVO 9th of Condie and 31st Chief of the Clan Oliphant. Sir Laurence was married to Mary Monica, daughter of Robert Tolver Gerard, 1st Baron Gerard of Bryn.

Laurence's family had lived in Strathearn within five miles of his home at Newton of Condie since 1183, first at Aberdalgie and then at Easter Lamberkin and finally at Condie.

Of his six siblings, two died before maturity and a third died before the age of forty. Of the three surviving siblings,

- Sir Anthony Oliphant was Chief Justice of Ceylon and accredited with having the first tea plantation in that country. Sir Anthony's son was Laurence Oliphant the famous author, diplomat, lawyer, traveller and mystic.
- Lt. Col James Oliphant was Chairman of the Honourable East India Company and one of his grandchildren was Sir Lancelot Oliphant, British Ambassador to Belgium, who was married to Christine McRae Sinclair, Viscountess Churchill. Another grandson (and brother to Sir Lancelot Oliphant) was Rear Admiral Laurence Richard Oliphant, who was married to the Hon. Adelaide Daphne Hermione Willoughby, daughter of the 10th Baron Middleton, who are the grandparents of the present (34th) Chief of the Oliphants.
- Thomas Oliphant, artist and musician, wrote the chorale for the wedding of King Edward VII and Queen Alexandra. He also wrote the words to "Deck the Hall(s) with Boughs of Holly" and the English words to "Men of Harlech".

== Political career ==
Oliphant was a Member of Parliament, elected both before and then again after the change in the electoral system introduced by the Reform Act 1832. His first election had been bitterly opposed because of his support for the electoral reform. His election manifesto was equally controversial and included opposition to people receiving places, pensions or sinecures (the abolition of patronage, protectionism and privilege); hostility to slavery; opposition to monopolies and the injustices of the Corn Laws; demands for reform of government Burghs, such that they should be elected by all citizens (and not just by the elite).

Oliphant and Buckingham petitioned Parliament for the Repeal of the Corn Laws in 1834. It was to be another eleven years before Parliament voted to put the repeal on the statutes. Oliphant introduced petitions to Parliament for establishing District Courts in Scotland and another against the System of Church Patronage in Scotland and one for the return of all offices abolished by the recommendation of the Select Committee on Sinecure Offices, in 1810, 1811, and 1812, and of the Finance Committee in 1817. He was also one of the MPs who presented a petition for the better observance of the Sabbath. In 1833 Oliphant also petitioned Parliament for the Abolition of Colonial Slavery. In 1834 he petitioned Parliament for the Repeal of the Stamp Duty on Receipts. It was not until 1964, some 131 years later that this finally came into effect.

Provost Wright nominated Lord James Stuart as a candidate to stand against Oliphant but on the day of the election polling was stopped as Oliphant had 458 votes to Lord James Stuart's 205 votes out of a possible 780 votes. So hostile were the sentiments of some members of Perth Burgh that Robert Smyth of Methven tried to block the use of the City Hall for a dinner organised for Oliphant in November 1833. The event finally went ahead in the December of the same year. In the general election of 1837 Arthur Kinnaird, 10th Lord Kinnaird stood as a Whig candidate in direct competition to Oliphant. This would have split the Whig vote and so Oliphant withdrew.

== Other appointments ==
Oliphant was also a Justice of the Peace for Perthshire and worked with the Perth Harbour Commission to improve facilities for access to Perth Harbour. He was also on the board of the Scottish Central Railway. Laurence was given the Freedom of the City of Perth in November, 1833 "for his independent behaviour at London".

== Personal life ==
Laurence 8th of Condie is most remembered for his part in the claim for the Gask inheritance. It was a legal battle which was to last for twenty years. In 1847 James Blair Oliphant, 10th and last laird of Gask (in the male line) died. In 1848 Laurence Oliphant of Condie obtained a decree of service in absence as heir male to the estate. However his claim was contested as insufficient evidence was provided. In February 1862 the decree of service was reversed and Laurence died very shortly afterwards in May of the same year. The case was continued on behalf of his only son and heir (Laurence James Oliphant, 9th of Condie) who was a minor. The 8th Condie was 55 years old when his son was born (by his third marriage); up until that point, Laurence Oliphant the author (8th Condie's nephew) was the heir male to the Condie estate (after his father, Sir Anthony Oliphant). In 1867 Laurence James Oliphant, 9th of Condie reached the age of 21 and immediately withdrew from the contest.

Parliament of the United Kingdom
Preceded by Francis Jeffrey	Member of Parliament for Perth; 1832–1837	Succeeded by Arthur Kinnaird
