= John Goldsborough Ravenshaw II =

Businessperson (1777 – 1840)

John Goldsborough Ravenshaw II (1777 – 6 June 1840, Crawley, Sussex) was the chairman of the British East India Company.

== Life ==
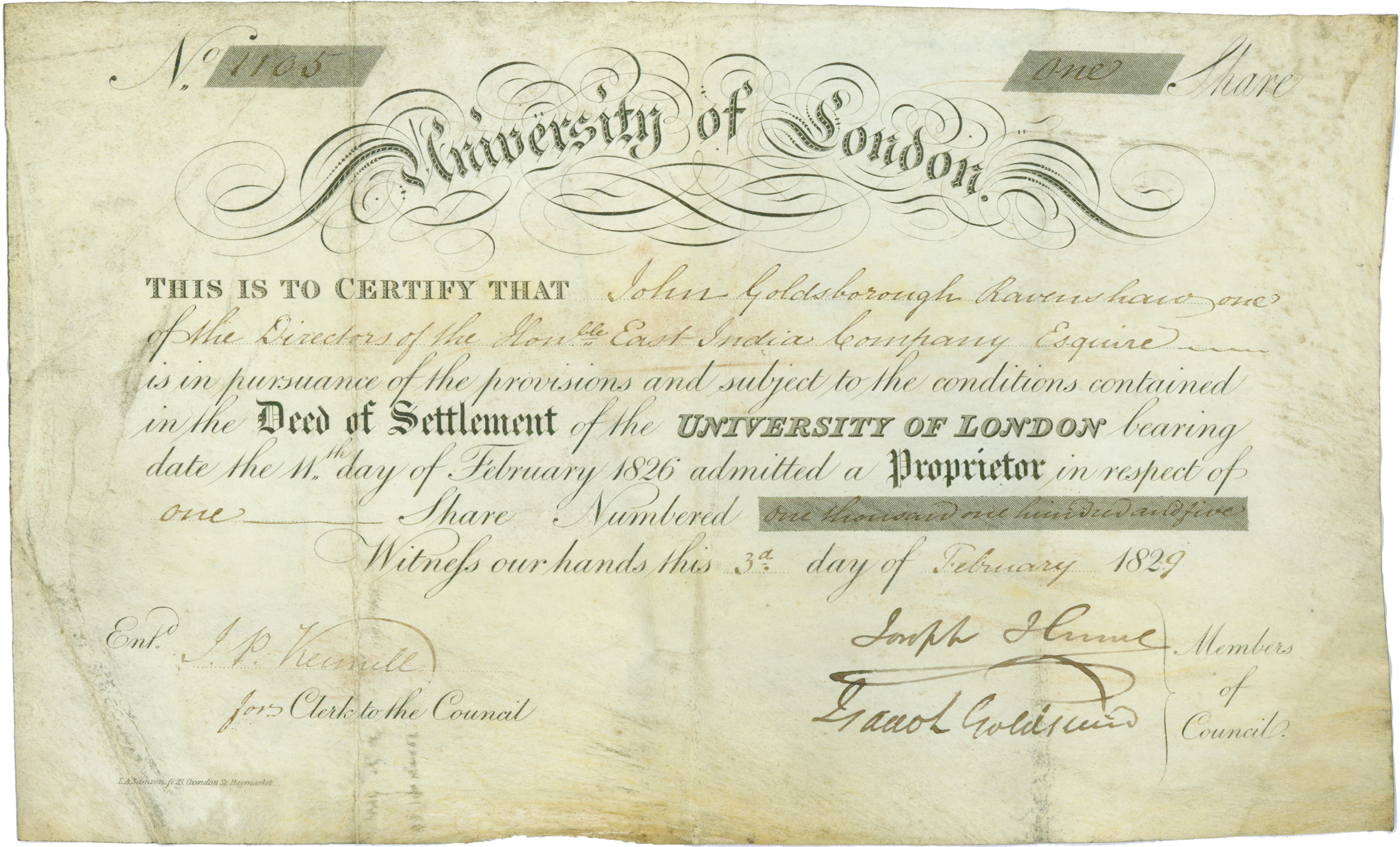
John Goldsborough Ravenshaw II was the owner of this share of the University of London, issued 3. February 1829

John Goldsborough Ravenshaw was the son of John Goldsborough Ravenshaw (died 1824) and Elizabeth Withers, and the great-grandson of William Withers. His parents, who married in January 1772, had already given birth to two sons (Reverend Edward and Colonel Thomas William Ravenshaw) when John was born, and gave birth to two more sons after the birth of John (Captains George and William Ravenshaw).

Some sources claim that Ravenshaw was educated at his father's college, Trinity College, Cambridge, but there is no documentary evidence of this. In 1801 he married Hannah Bond, a daughter of Commodore Charles John Bond, of the British East India Company's Bombay Marine. They had 12 children, including John Hurdis (father of Major General Hurdis Ravenshaw) and Hester (wife of Sir Charles Jasper Selwyn). The family lived on Harley Street in London, England. Ravenshaw became first one of the directors of the British East India Company in 1819, Deputy Chairman from 1829 to 1831, and chairman in 1832. He remained as director until his death in 1840.
