= Thomas Oliphant (lyricist) =

Scottish musician, artist and author (1799–1873)

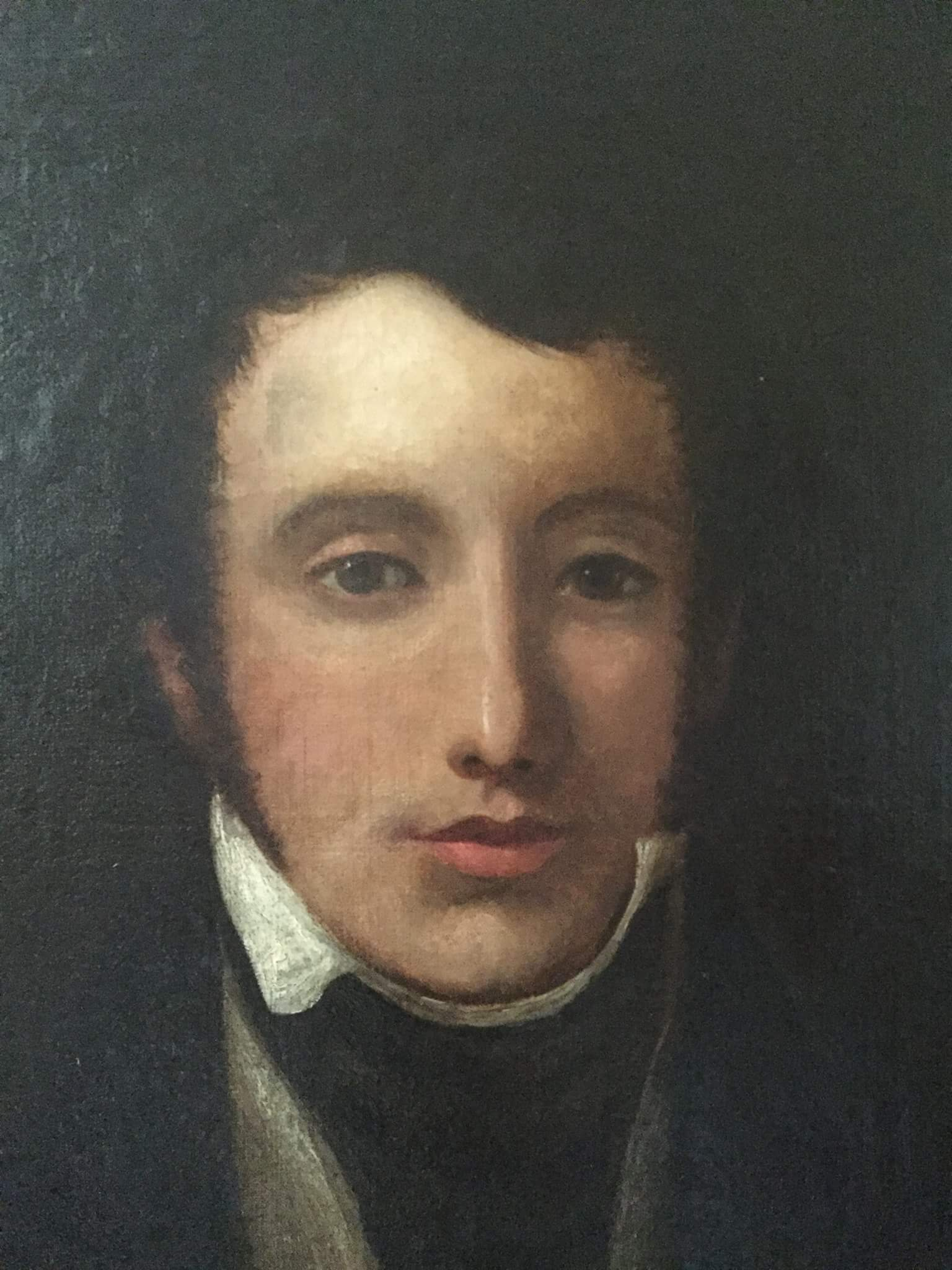
Thomas Oliphant as a young man. Date and artist unknown. The original is in his family's collection.

Thomas Oliphant (1799 – 1873) was a Scottish musician, artist and author. He wrote the chorale for the wedding of the future King Edward VII and Queen Alexandra, as well as the words to "Deck the Hall(s) with Boughs of Holly".

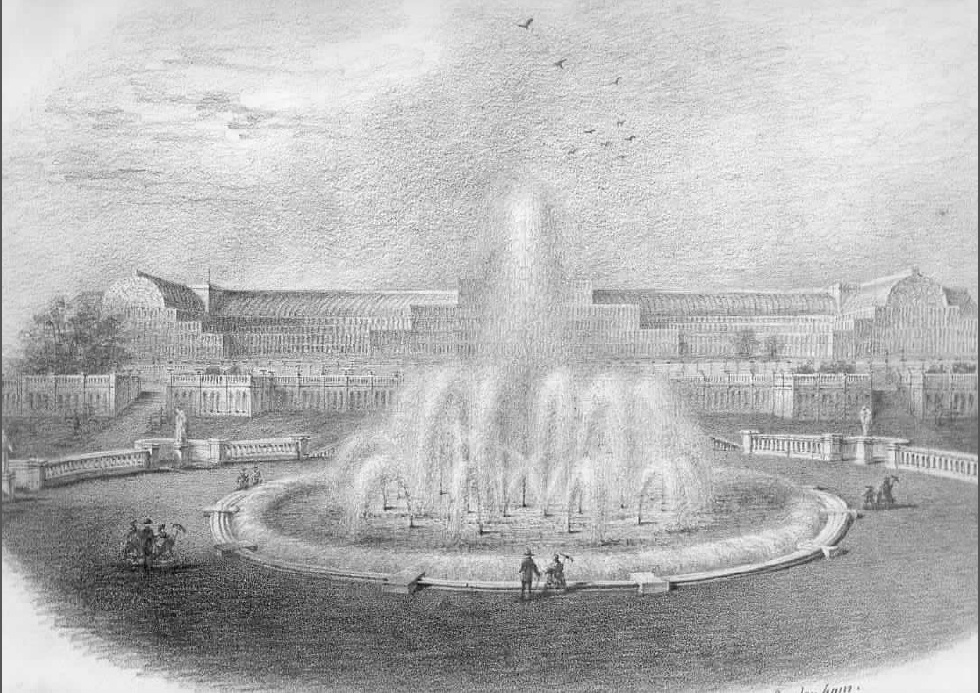
One of a series of thirty five drawings by Thomas Oliphant of the Crystal Palace at Sydenham drawn between 1855 and 1860. The original is in his family's collection.

== Family background ==
Thomas was the fifth son of Ebenezer Oliphant, 7th of Condie and Mary, 3rd daughter of Sir William Stirling, Bt. of Ardoch, Perth and Kinross. Thomas was baptised at Forgandenny on Christmas Day in 1799.

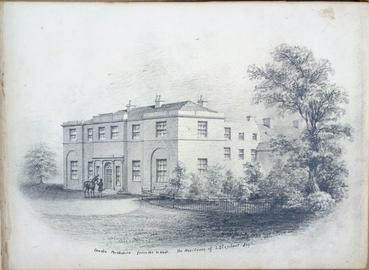
Drawing of Newton of Condie by Thomas Oliphant (circa 1853), his birthplace and ancestral home.

Oliphant was closely related to Carolina Oliphant, Lady Nairne. Oliphant had a total of six brothers and sisters. His eldest brother was Laurence Oliphant, 8th of Condie, Member of Parliament for Perth from 1832 to 1837. Another older brother, Sir Anthony Oliphant, was Chief Justice of Ceylon. A third brother, Lt. Col. James Oliphant, was Chairman of the Honourable East India Company and it is from this brother that the present chiefly line of Oliphants descend. Thomas died unmarried on 9 March 1873 in Great Marlborough Street.

== Early life ==
Oliphant was educated at Winchester College but left early. He became a member of the London Stock Exchange but after a short time left to pursue his interest in music and literature.

== The Madrigal Society ==
In 1830 Oliphant was admitted a member of the Madrigal Society and in 1832 he became the Honorary Secretary of the society, a position which he held for 39 years, eventually becoming first the vice-president and then a year later President of the Society in 1871. He wrote English words to a considerable number of Italian Madrigals for the Society's use, in some instances his words were translations but in many, they were his own creation.

== Musical career ==
Like his more famous cousin, Oliphant was primarily a lyricist, writing his own new words or his own interpretations to his "translations" of existing songs in foreign languages. Oliphant took part in the Great Handel festival in Westminster Abbey in the chorus as the bass vocalist. In 1855, he was asked by the directors of the Philharmonic Society to translate portions of Wagner's opera Lohengrin which were then performed by the Philharmonic Society's (now known as the Royal Philharmonic Society) orchestra and chorus at the Hanover Square Rooms and conducted by Wagner himself. Oliphant wrote the words for the chorale for the wedding of King Edward VII and Queen Alexandra in 1863. The music was composed by Prince Albert and when Queen Victoria heard the recital, she was said to have been much affected by the chorale as Prince Albert had died over a year before in 1861. Oliphant was described as the "Poet of the Court", as he wrote lyrics for Royal events and other important occasions.

In Victorian Britain the vogue for translating foreign lyrics into English was popular. It was a pastime at which Oliphant was prodigious. Oliphant's position in the music world has diminished to the point where he is largely unknown but in his lifetime his standing was significant. An illustration of this is a letter in The Musical World dated October 1869, concerning someone else's transgression: "We shall next have the musical knowledge of Hogarth called into question or the profundity of Parry; or the orchestral skill of Hullah; or the madrigalian researches of Oliphant; or the genius of Louis Emmanuel; or the modesty of Eliason....".

In spite of his extensive interpretations of German songs, it would appear that, at one time at least, Oliphant did not speak German. As one of his friends and contemporaries put it: "Many a popular drawing-room song of those days bore on its title-page the intimation, ' Words by Thomas Oliphant, Esq.' Tom knew no German, and when he was told of a song in that noble tongue which was likely to suit him commercially, he asked me to give him a bare English prose translation of it, which he then turned into metre..... 'The Standard-Bearer' was one of the most successful of the many prose-skeleton songs of which I thus furnished him." Given the quantity of "translations" which Oliphant produced, it is hard to see how he could not have gained some knowledge of German in the process. Oliphant also drew from Welsh, French, Italian and other languages, it is possible that he was not fully conversant in these languages either (nevertheless it is known from his collection of Italian sketches, that he did at some stage travel in Italy), which is probably partly why his English verses are not translations but his own interpretations. "Nos Gallen" is a notable example, since it is a New Year's Eve song, which Oliphant turned into the Christmas carol "Deck the Hall" (although he published it as "Nos Gallen" in 1862 and it has since become known by its first line).

Oliphant commissioned eighteen works by John Liptrot Hatton who worked under the pseudonym of 'P.B. Czapek' (alluding to the Hungarian word for a Hat, for 'Hatton'). These compositions were based on the style of German classics.

Following Oliphant's death in 1873, his valuable music collection was sold by Messrs. Puttick and Simpson.

== Some musical works by Oliphant ==
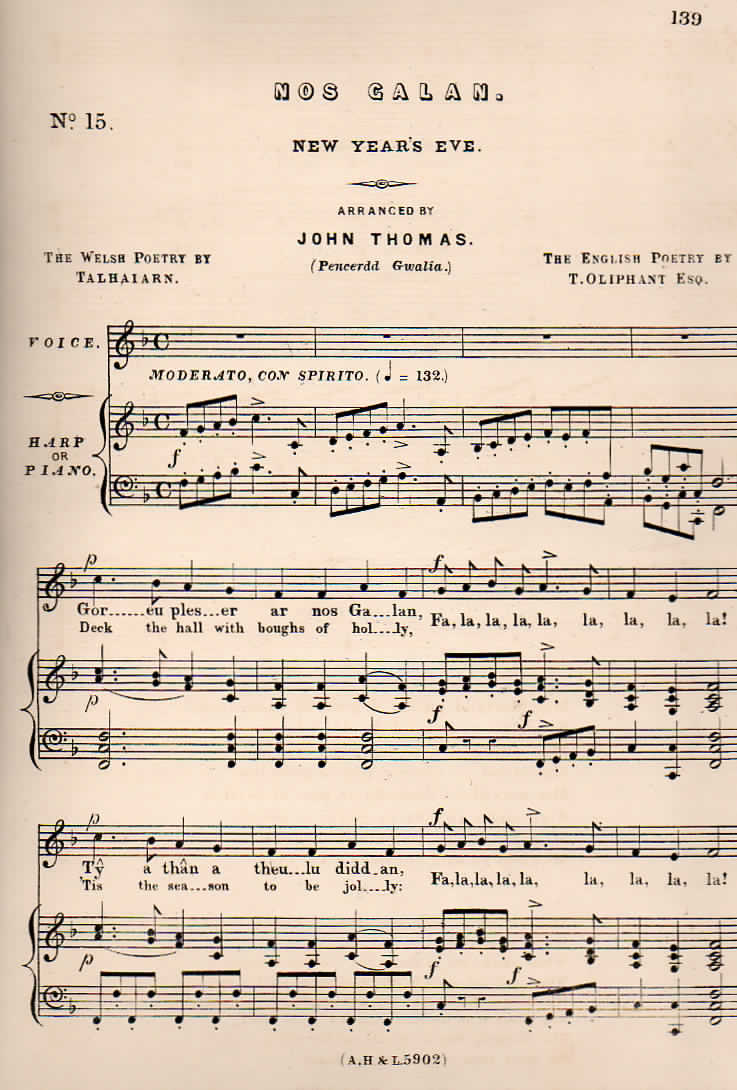
Thomas Oliphant's original words for Deck The Hall With Boughs of Holly as they appear in "Welsh Melodies With Welsh and English Poetry" (volume 2), published in 1862

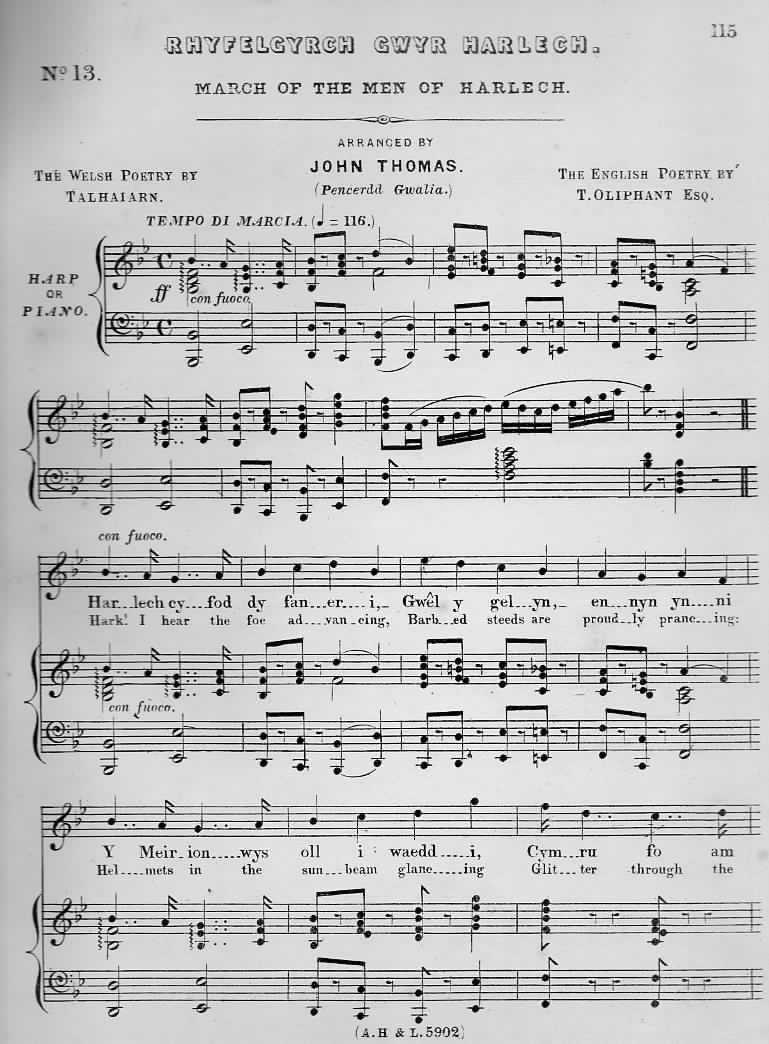
Thomas Oliphant's original words for Men of Harlech as they appear in "Welsh Melodies With Welsh and English Poetry" (volume 2), published in 1862

English version of Beethoven's works "Fidelio", "The Mount of Olives" and "Adelaide".

Beethoven's "The praise of music" – the English version adapted expressly for the concerts of the Vocal Society by Thomas Oliphant.

"Ave Maria" English version by Thomas Oliphant; music by Schubert.

Other works by Schubert with the English by Thomas Oliphant:

"Let me weep again"

"I came when Spring was smiling"

"Fast Homeward there rode (the erl king)"

"Thine is my Heart"

"Forlorn I track the mountains steep (the Wanderer)".

"Sleepest Thou Fair Maiden"

"Death Thou Unrelenting Foe"

"Behold yon Rose Tree";

"My Pretty Fisher Maiden"

"All Unstrung Hangs my Lute"

"On Mossy Bank Reclining"

"Weary Flowers their Buds are Closing (Serenade)"

"The Passing Bell"

"Calm as a Child in its Cradle"

"Weep not for Friends Departed"

"My life is but a Summer Day"

"Why Fond Youth such Wild Emotion"

"Tis Sweet to Think"

"Dear Mother do not Chide Me, (the Echo)"

"A Warrior I Am"

"Time Likely Hath Flown O'er Me"

"Smooth is the Moonlit Sea"

"Proudly Our Heads We Lift on High"

"Hark The Lark" and "Who is Sylvia?"

"The Trout"

"Thy Face is Every Blooming Flower I see";

"La Circassienne". A comic opera in three acts. Composer Daniel François Esprit, (1782–1871). English translation by Oliphant.

"Maiden Fair, O Deign to Tell" by Thomas Oliphant/Joseph Haydn.

"O have you seen a bonny lass" words by Thos Oliphant Esqr. music by Maurice Cobham, 1840.

Works with music by Friedrich Curschmann, English words by Thomas Oliphant:-

"Rest Love The Twilight Is Closing" – A Serenade and "She is Mine",

"Thine is my heart" (Dein ist mein Herz),

"Arise Bright Golden Star Of Day" – A Song

Oliphant wrote the English words for the opera "The Regicide", the music by Pietro Metastasio and authored/set by Charles Lucas

"Down in a Flow'ry Vale", a Madrigal for Four Voices – The Words imitated from the Italian by Thomas Oliphant, original by Constantius Festa,

"The daughter's gift" (ballad), the poetry written by Thomas Oliphant, the music composed by Jules Benedict.

"Heart Fond Heart, Why Dost Thou Languish" (Herz. mein herz. warum so Traurig) English Version by T. Oliphant Esq. Music by Carl Maria von Weber

"The Mist is rising from hill & dale" ("Thale dampfen" from the opera "Euranthe") English Version by T. Oliphant Esq. Music by Carl Maria von Weber

"Could I Thro' Aether Fly" (Konnt Ich Durch Raume Flieh'n), music by Bernhard Molique, English words by Thomas Oliphant

"The Jewish Maiden" (Das Madchen von Jud) and "All is Still in Slumber Deep" (Schlummerlied), music by Kucken and English words by Oliphant.

"The Post Horn", German song adapted to English words, music by Conradin Kreutzer, lyrics by Oliphant

"Stay One Moment Gentle Sires" words and music by Thomas Oliphant.

"Bid Me To Live, and I will Live" words and music by Thomas Oliphant.

"David of the White Rock" (Dafydd y Garreg Wen) Welsh words by John Hughes, English words by Oliphant.

"All ye who Music Love" by Donato Baldassare, English words (which are not a translation) by Thomas Oliphant.

"Where floats the standard" (Die Fahnenwacht) English version by Thomas Oliphant composed by Peter Josef von Lindpaintner

"Llewelyn, A Dramatic Cantata" was dedicated to the Prince of Wales. It was composed by Queen Victoria's harpist, John Thomas ('Pencerdd Gwalia'; 1826–1913) the harpist and Welsh bard, with Welsh words by the bard John Jones (Talhaiarn 1810–69) and parallel English words by Thomas Oliphant,

"The Lark". Welsh words by John Jones (Talhaiarn), English words by Oliphant.

"The Ash Grove" published in Volume I of the 1862 collection Welsh Melodies, With Welsh And English Poetry, by John Jones (Talhaiarn) & Thomas Oliphant.

"Santa Lucia" Neapolitan barcarolle, edited by Mario Favilli, translated by Thomas Oliphant.

"The Shepherds Winter Song", "The Violet" and "The Chapel" with music by P B Czapek, and English words by T Oliphant,

"Men of Harlech" translated into English by Thomas Oliphant. published in Volume 2 of the 1862 collection Welsh Melodies, With Welsh And English Poetry, by John Jones (Talhaiarn) & Thomas Oliphant.

"All Through the Night" Welsh words by John Jones (Talhaiarn 1810–69), English words by Thomas Oliphant.

"The eye of night", the English version by T. Oliphant, music by Johann Wenzel Kalliwoda. Similarly, Oliphant wrote English words for other works by Kalliwoda: "The mill stream is roaring" and " Let me not hear".

"Tell me where bloometh true love" – words by Oliphant and music by Louis Spohr.

"Where'er I Careless Wander" (Greeting) English words by Oliphant, music by Mendelssohn.

"Ah Me! How Soon" (Autumn Song) Op.63 English words by Oliphant, music by Mendelssohn.

"Service and Responses" edited by Oliphant original by Thomas Tallis

"Song of Forty Parts" edited by Oliphant original by Thomas Tallis.

149th Psalm: "I will give thanks": Giovanni Pierluigi da Palestrina (Words T Oliphant)

"O Be Joyful": Giovanni Pierluigi da Palestrina (words T Oliphant)

"Be Not Thou Far From Me": Giovanni Pierluigi da Palestrina (Words T Oliphant)

"Hard By A Fountain": Huberto Waelrent (words Oliphant)

"Let Us All Sing, Merrily Sing": Jer. Saville (words Oliphant)

"Ah Me! Where Is My True Love?" : Felice Anerio (words Oliphant)

"Lady, See, On Every Side" : Luca Marenzio (words Oliphant)

"When April deck'd in roses gay" : Luca Marenzio (words Oliphant) used in the Commemoration of Sir Thomas Gresham, Saturday, May 14, 1836

"Stay limpit Stream" Luca Marenzio (English words written after the manner of "The Triumphs of Oriana" by Oliphant)

"Hark, The Village Maids Are Singing" : Cherubini (words Oliphant)

"All Hail, Britannia!" : Antonio Lotti (words adapted Oliphant)

Many songs by the Rev. Christopher Tye had new words given to them by Oliphant.

"Nymphs are sporting" a cappella R. L. de Pearsall, text by Thomas Oliphant

"Dainty fine bird." Madrigal by Orlando Gibbons, arranged by T. Oliphant

"The Two Nightingales" duet by Anton Hackel (The English version by Thomas Oliphant)

Oliphant also wrote words to works by Thalberg, and others.

== Other appointments ==
In 1841 Oliphant was appointed to catalogue MS and printed music at the British Museum by Anthony Panizzi. By 1842 he had completed the first catalogue of the manuscript music. He began the cataloguing of the printed music which he completed by 1849. Oliphant resigned from the British Museum in 1850 as a result of a "run-in" with Panizzi. In 1852 he became librarian to the Musical Institute of London. In the 1860s he was arranging musical productions at Crystal Palace. He was also an Auditor of the Royal Society of Female Musicians and of the National Opera Company. Oliphant was also Literary Illustrator of the London Glee and Madrigal Union in 1860 and 1861.

== Art ==
On leaving the British Museum, Oliphant returned to his childhood home in Scotland. Between 1850 and 1860 Oliphant completed three (known) volumes of sketches. The first is a visual record of pencil sketches of landscapes and buildings as he journeyed through Orkney, Shetland, Caithness, Sutherland, Ross-shire, Inverness-shire and Perthshire, 1852. The second volume actually starts in 1850 with drawings of his ancestral home and is a series of sketches of landscapes mainly around Strathearn but also charts his journey to the West Coast of Scotland in 1853, the Isle of Man and his journey back to the South of England and the last is a collection of sketches of Crystal Palace between 1855 and 1860. What makes the last volume interesting is that John Jones (Talhaiarn) with whom Oliphant collaborated on all four volumes of "Welsh Melodies" (1862–1874) was for a while an architect who worked on Crystal Palace under Sir Joseph Paxton.

Oliphant returned to Scotland the year after for another purpose. His brother, Laurence Oliphant, 8th of Condie and 30th Chief of Clan Oliphant, was involved in (what turned into a twenty one year) legal battle to be recognised as heir to his cousin's estate. In a genealogical chart, re-drawn in 1889, are the words: "sed Chartum virginum ex variis documentis antiquis Thomas Oliphant A.D. 1854 collegit:-"

== Publications ==
1834 "Comments of a Chorus Singer at the Royal Musical Festival at Westminster Abbey" under the pseudonym Saloman Sackbut.

1835 "A Brief Account of the Madrigal Society".

1836 "A Short Account of Madrigals".

1837 "La Musa Madrigalesca". The book contains the words of nearly four hundred madrigals, ballets and roundelays. Publishers Calkin and Budd

1840 "Catches and Rounds by Old Composers" adapted to Modern Words by Thomas Oliphant.

1862 "Welsh Melodies, With Welsh And English Poetry", vols. 1 & 2, by John Jones (Talhaiarn) & Thomas Oliphant. Author: John Thomas.

1870 "Welsh Melodies, With Welsh And English Poetry", vol. 3, by John Jones (Talhaiarn) & Thomas Oliphant. Author: John Thomas.

1874 "Welsh Melodies, With Welsh And English Poetry", vol. 4, by John Jones (Talhaiarn) & Thomas Oliphant. Author: John Thomas.
