= Sir Thomas Reid, 1st Baronet =

Scottish-born London merchant (1762–1824)

Sir Thomas Reid, 1st Baronet (1762–1824) was a Scottish-born London merchant who was a director and Governor of the East India Company.

He was born the son of merchant James Reid and Helen Davidson of Dumfries and moved to London to enter the world of commerce himself. In about 1790 he became a partner with John Irving in the West India trading house of his relative John Rae, which expanded its operations to the East Indies and became Reid, Irving and Company.

In 1803 he became a director of the East India Company, being elected again in 1805–08 and 1810–13. In 1815 and 1820 he served as Deputy-Governor of the company, followed in both cases by being made Governor the following year (1816 and 1821). He was also a director of the Imperial Insurance Office.

He inherited Greystone Park, Dumfriesshire and also purchased estates at Ewell Grove and Woodmansterne in Surrey. He was made a Baronet (of Ewell) on 10 November 1823.

He died in 1829 of a burst blood vessel and was buried in the family vault at St Mary's Church, Ewell. He had married Elizabeth Goodfellow, daughter of John Looker Goodfellow.

He left Greystone Park and Ewell Grove to his eldest son, Sir John Rae Reid, 2nd Baronet and Woodmansterne to his younger son George.

== See also ==
- List of East India Company directors

Baronetage of the United Kingdom
New creation	Baronet (of Ewell Grove); 1823–1824	Succeeded by John Reid
