= Lancelot Oliphant =

British diplomat (1881-1965)

Sir Lancelot Oliphant, KCMG, CB (8 October 1881 – 2 October 1965) was a British diplomat, Ambassador Extraordinary and Plenipotentiary to Belgium, Minister-Plenipotentiary to Luxembourg and Director General of the Foreign Office.

His decision that Britain would neither join nor fund a joint partnership with Saudi Arabia to explore for oil, thus forcing the Saudis to cooperate with the United States, left him with the unwanted sobriquet The diplomat who said 'No' to Saudi oil.

== Family background ==
Lancelot Oliphant was the youngest of three sons of Arthur Craigie Oliphant and Agnes Mary, daughter of Rear Admiral William Horton and grand daughter of Admiral Joshua Sydney Horton. Sir Lancelot's grandfather was Col. James Oliphant, Chairman of the East India Company, who in turn was the younger brother of Laurence Oliphant, 8th of Condie, Member of Parliament for Perth. Lancelot was married to Christine McRae Sinclair. She had previously been married to Victor Albert Francis Charles Spencer, 1st Viscount Churchill (1864–1934). One of Sir Lancelot's brothers was Rear Admiral Laurence Richard Oliphant, who was married to the Hon. Adelaide Daphne Hermione Willoughby, daughter of the 10th Baron Middleton, who are the grandparents of the present (34th) Chief of the Oliphants. Lancelot was educated privately.

== Career ==
Lancelot joined the Foreign Office on 25 August 1903 as a clerk. He passed the examination second out of sixteen. In September 1905 he was appointed third Secretary in Constantinople. In August 1906 Lancelot returned to the Foreign Office and worked in the eastern department. Between March, 1909 and October 1911 he was third Secretary in Tehran. He subsequently returned to the eastern department at the Foreign Office. During the First World War Oliphant worked in the War Office department, dealing with political affairs.

After the First World War, he was assistant secretary in the Foreign Office's central department, and acting counsellor from December 1920. In September 1923 he was promoted to counsellor and returned to the eastern department. In February 1928 Oliphant was promoted to acting assistant under-secretary of state and then in April 1929, to substantive under-secretary of state.

Around 9/10 May 1932 Oliphant made the decision that subsequently earned him the sobriquet The diplomat who said 'No' to Saudi oil. He received Prince Faisal of Saudi Arabia, the son of King Ibn Saud of Saudi Arabia, at the Foreign Office in London. At that time, Saudi Arabia was an impoverished state with no known oil reserves. The Prince's adviser requested a loan of £500,000 to explore and develop the Saudi oil industry. Although an American had produced a report on Arabia's potential oil wealth, Ibn Saud "always preferred to deal with the British, and would welcome the assistance of British firms in exploiting the mineral resources of his country". Oliphant replied that "British firms might hesitate to accept a report not drawn up by a British expert", and expressed doubt "as to the readiness of British firms to sink capital in a little-known country at the present time".

As a result of Oliphant's refusal the Saudis developed ties with the United States, and on 31 May an American team struck oil.

In March 1936 Oliphant was promoted to deputy under-secretary of state (which lasted until 1939). From 1908 to 1939 Oliphant was linked either directly or indirectly with Persian affairs. Even when he was transferred to the central department, Persia had to be declared part of Central Europe so that he could continue to be involved.

In his capacity of deputy under secretary of state in the run-up to the Second World War, Oliphant was at the centre of the political activity when Lord Halifax and Neville Chamberlain were trying to negotiate a peace agreement with Adolf Hitler.

Lancelot Oliphant was appointed Ambassador to Brussels and Minister-Plenipotentiary to Luxembourg in December 1939. He was interned by the Nazis between 1940 and 1941. He then returned to Britain where he continued his ambassadorial duties to the exiled Governments of Belgium and Luxembourg. Oliphant retired as ambassador in September 1944 and in November of the same year, retired from the Foreign Office.

Oliphant was appointed a Companion of the Order of the Bath (CB) in 1929, a Companion of the Order of St Michael and St George (CMG) in the 1917 Birthday Honours, and promoted to Knight Commander of the Order (KCMG) in the 1931 New Year Honours.

== Publications ==
- Great Comic Scenes from English Literature (1930)
- Great Love Scenes from English Literature (1931)
- An Ambassador in Bonds (1946)
- Notes on Oliphants of Condie and Gask (1946)
- Young Peter Quest (1950)
- English Observed: Common Errors in Written English (1955)

Preceded by Sir Robert Clive	British Ambassador to Belgium; 1939–?	Succeeded by Sir Hughe Knatchbull-Hugessen
