= Archibald Galloway =

Sir Archibald Galloway
- Born: 12 February 1779; Perth, Perthshire, Scotland
- Died: 6 April 1850 (aged 71); 18 Upper Harley Street, London
- Occupation: Director of the East India Company
- Known for: Military strategy, Indian Law

Major General Sir Archibald Galloway KCB (12 February 1779 – 6 April 1850), was a Scottish military officer, a Director of the Honorable East India Company, and a writer on military strategy, warfare, and the law in India.

== Biography ==
Archibald Galloway was born in Perth, Perthshire, Scotland, the son of James Galloway of that city and region. He obtained a cadetship in 1799, and on 29 October 1800 was appointed ensign in the 14th Bengal native infantry. He afterwards served in the 29th, 10th, and 2nd Bengal native infantry regiments, and was gazetted colonel of the 58th Bengal native infantry on 22 September 1836. Galloway took part in the defence of Delhi, and distinguished himself greatly by his gallantry at the siege of Bhurtpore. He was appointed by Lord William Bentinck a member of the military board, and was nominated a Companion of the Order of the Bath on 20 July 1838 in Queen Victoria's Coronation Honours. On 24 Sept. 1840 he was elected a director of the East India Company, and on 23 Nov. 1841 received the rank of major-general. He was created a K.C.B. when knighted by Queen Victoria at Buckingham Palace on 25 August 1848, and in the following year became Chairman of the Honourable East India Company. He died at his home in 18 Upper Harley Street, London, on 6 April 1850, aged 71. He left three sons and six daughters. An engraved portrait of Sir Archibald Galloway was published by Dickinson of New Bond Street in August 1850. He

== Honors and Credits ==
Galloway was thanked for his many and varied services to the Indian government by "commanders-in-chief in India on nine different occasions, and by the supreme government of India, or the court of directors, and superior authorities in England on upwards of thirty occasions". He married Adelaide Campbell in Calcutta India on 28 November 1815. He was by then a captain in the H.C.S. and 36 years of age. Prior to this marriage, he had fathered two sons by an unknown partner/wife, named James and George. There was a recorded Baptism for James age 10 years and George age 9 years dated 14 Jan 1816, about six weeks after his marriage to Adelaide Campbell. James was born about 1806 and died 17 March 1841 aged 32 in Bengal India. Younger brother George was born about 1807. George married Rebecca Baldwin on 17 December 1833 in the Calcutta Cathedral George Galloway was the great grandfather of Mary Blanche Gertrude Galloway who married Vernon Hope French in Rangoon on 16 September 1906.

== Literary works ==
Sir Archibald was the author of the following works : 1. A Commentary on the Mohammedan Law. 2. Notes on the Siege of Delhi in 1804, with Observations on the position of the Indian Government under the Marquess of Wellesley, 8vo. 3. On Sieges of India. This work is said to have been reprinted, on the recommendation of General Mudge, by the court of directors, and used at their military college, and to have been distributed to the army for general instruction by the orders of the Marquis of Hastings (ib. p. 661). 4. Treatise on the Manufacture of Gunpowder. 5. 'Observations on the Law and Constitution and present Government of India,' &c., second edition, with additions, London, 1832, 8vo.
