= Roger Drake (colonial administrator) =

British colonial administrator (born 1721 or 1722)

Roger Drake (born 1721 or 1722) was a British administrator in the East India Company. He served as President of Fort William in Bengal between 1752 and 1756 and was later reprimanded for his actions during the Siege of Calcutta in 1756.

== Biography ==
Born in 1721 or 1722, Drake was the nephew of financier Roger Drake, of the firm Drake and Long based in Leadenhall Street and prominent director of the East India Company. Drake joined the service of the East India Company and arrived in Bengal on 26 May 1737. He rose through the ranks and became President of Fort William on 8 August 1752 following the death of William Fytche.

In April 1756, Siraj ud-Daulah became Nawab of Bengal and sought to reprimand the company for abusing their privileged trading rights. He wrote a letter to both the French and British Company's requesting that they remove all fortifications at Chandannagore and Calcutta. The French replied tactfully claiming they were merely repairing existing structures whilst Drake replied that he was improving the defences in case of war with France. Siraj Ud Daulah was angered by Drake's perceived insolent response and tone and began plotting to punish the company. On 16 June 1756, Siraj Ud Daulah approached Calcutta with an army numbering 30,000 and within four days the town and Fort were captured. During the siege Drake controversially abandoned his post and with a handful of fellow officers sought refuge with the women and children on ships moored nearby Later, eye-witnesses reported that his ship was fired on by the men he deserted as he sailed away down the river. In his absence John Zephaniah Holwell was placed in charge and led the defence until their capitulation in the evening of 20 June. Calcutta was subsequently sacked and the remaining Europeans were held captive in the Black Hole of Calcutta.

Drake was disgraced by his actions in the Siege and an inquiry was held to investigate his actions. He was officially removed from his post by the company on 13 November 1757. He was succeeded as Governor by Robert Clive, who would re-capture Calcutta following the Battle of Plassey and firmly establish Company rule in India. Despite his disgrace, Drake benefited from Mir Jafar's payment of compensation and damages following the Battle of Plassey, and in 1759 returned to England with eight fellow Company officials and a considerable fortune.

== Personal life ==
He married Mary Coales on 10 January 1743 and they had a daughter Millicent. After Mary's death on 6 October 1749 he married her sister Martha Coales with whom he had three more children, Roger, Richard, and Nathaniel.

Political offices
Preceded by William Fytche	President of Bengal; 8 August 1752 – October 1756	Succeeded by Robert Clive
