= Richard Atkinson (MP) =

Merchant and director of the East India Company (1739–1785)

Richard Atkinson (1739–1785) was an English merchant and government contractor, an East India Company director, and for a short period Member of Parliament for New Romney. He was noted as a supplier of rum to the armed forces, and as a political ally of the 1780s of William Pitt the Younger.

== Early life ==
He was born at Temple Sowerby, Westmorland, the third son of the tanner Matthew Atkinson and his wife Margaret Sutton of Kirkby Lonsdale. As a young man he sought his fortune in London's counting houses.

== Merchant ==
In the mid-1760s, Atkinson was an associate of the banker Alexander Fordyce, and lent money to John Bindley for election expenses. Joining the West India merchants Hutchinson Mure, he became a partner there in 1766. Later he was London agent for Paul Benfield, the nabob and financier. Edmund Burke made much of Atkinson's connection with Benfield in speaking on the impeachment of Warren Hastings, after Atkinson's death.

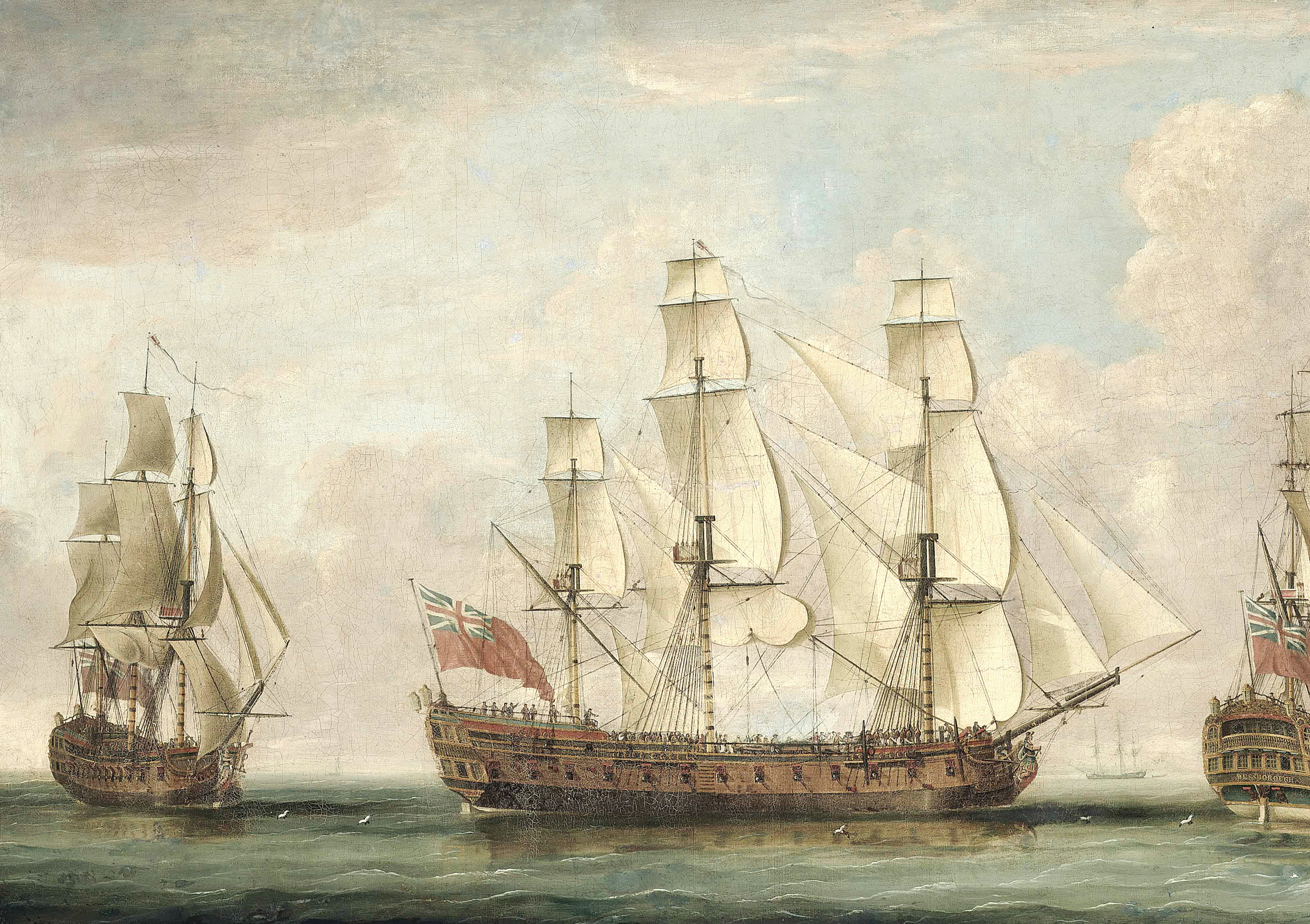
Bessborough Indiaman, built for Richard Atkinson and launched 1772

Atkinson with William James and Abel Smith had from 1776 and the outbreak of the American Revolutionary War a contract to supply British forces in Canada. He became famous for his rum contract for the forces. Saying he was uncomfortable with the public criticism to which he was exposed by the contract, he withdrew from most of his business dealings with the government in 1779.

== East India Company reforms ==
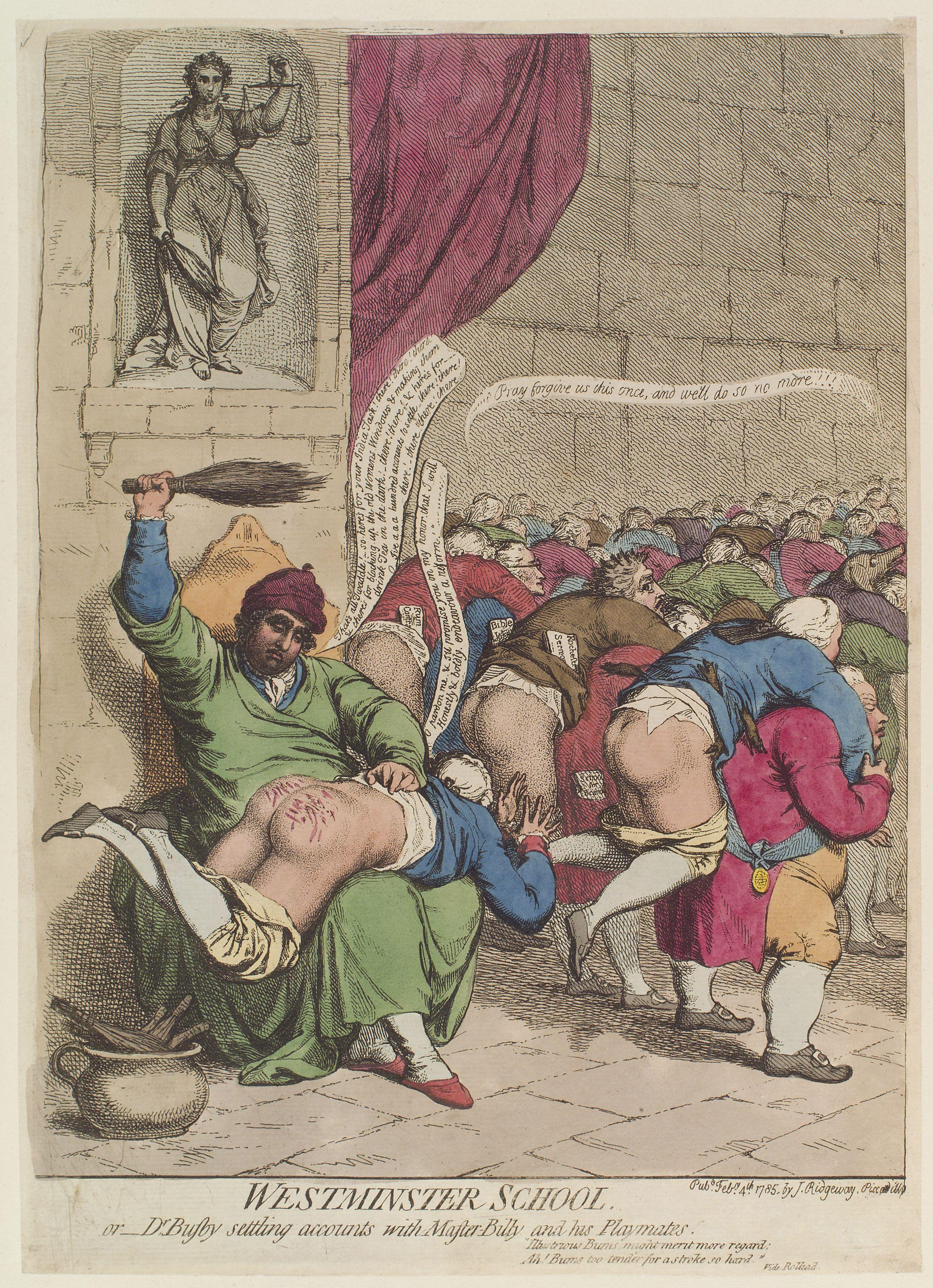
Westminster school. or - Dr Busby settling accounts with Master-Billy and his playmates, James Gillray satirical print from 1785, Charles James Fox in character as Richard Busby, notorious headmaster, flogging William Pitt the Younger, behind whom from left to right are the allies Richard Atkinson (with "Rum Contract" in his pocket), Sir Richard Hill, 2nd Baronet and John Robinson

Atkinson became a director of the East India Company in 1783. He belonged to a committee of East India Company shareholders, with Laurence Sulivan and George Johnstone, appointed to undermine proposed reforms to the Company brought forward by Charles James Fox, at the period of the Fox–North coalition of 1783. Fox's India Bill was successfully opposed in Parliament.

The coalition was brought down towards the end of 1783, and Atkinson was one of the plotters in a covert move against it that hinged on the "Indian interest". John Robinson switched his support from Lord North to Pitt. Acting for Pitt and Henry Dundas, and with the support of Charles Jenkinson who represented George III, Robinson and Atkinson took soundings in the House of Lords with a view to throwing out the India Bill. The King showed his approval via Earl Temple, and the coalition fell at the beginning of December. Before New Year Pitt had become prime minister.

== In parliament ==
Ahead of the 1784 general election, Robinson advised Pitt that 72 House of Commons seats were available to a purchaser, and Atkinson compiled a list of approved candidates, of whom some were prepared to pay for a seat. Atkinson himself failed to get elected for the four-member City of London constituency, falling a few votes short of the radical politician John Sawbridge who placed fourth. He entered parliament that year, when John Smith, who worked as a solicitor for the East India Company, gave up the New Romney seat to him. He was accepted for the seat by Sir Edward Dering, 6th Baronet, who controlled it, because Pitt made the request, though Dering disliked Atkinson's character. In October 1784 Atkinson became a London alderman, for Tower Ward.

As a supporter of the first Pitt ministry, Atkinson was a target of the satirical Rolliad. It made fun from the proposition that Pitt was under the control of Atkinson and Charles Jenkinson; Atkinson being called "Kinson the less" or the "minor Kinson", the joke being explained in the line "Of either KINSON, AT. or JEN., the tool"; or learnedly as an apocope (in the sense of apheresis).

== Personal affairs, death and legacy ==
Atkinson did not marry; he asked Lady Anne Lindsay to marry him, but was refused. His complex will left her an annuity, and also showed that he was involved in the management of her financial affairs; he had advised other members of her family, too, from 1779. Through John Robinson he was also involved from 1783 in managing with Sir John Dyer, 6th Baronet the trust set up by Richard Smith (died 1776), at a time when Charlotte Smith with her husband Benjamin, son of Richard Smith, were in the King's Bench Prison for debt. Robinson through the arrangement resolved the legal case brought by Thomas Dyer against Benjamin Smith, and the Smiths were released in 1784.

Suffering from consumption, Atkinson towards the end of his life was ill and no longer counted on by his political associate Dundas. He died on 28 May 1785, reportedly with an estate worth over £300,000. He left legacies to his nine nieces and eight nephews, and entailed his Jamaican plantation to the sons of his late brother George Atkinson with Bridget Atkinson, who had an annuity. He left a large sum of money, and litigation over it continued over some four decades.
