= John Shepherd (governor and chairman) =

Chairman of the British East India Company and Governor of the Hudson's Bay Company

John Shepherd (1792–1859) was chairman of the East India Company in 1844, 1850 and 1851. He was Governor of the Hudson's Bay Company from 1856 to 1858.

== Biography ==
He served as a fourth officer in the Indian marine from 1813–1814, and was commander of the Duke of York from 1821 - 1822.

In 1858, he was one of the EIC directors appointed to the new Council of India.

The 1850s were a time when the Canadian Government were trying to break the monopoly which the Hudson's Bay Company held over trade in the Red River and Saskatchewan Districts. This coincided with Shepherd's term in office as Governor. Shepherd's previous experience as Chairman of the East India Company helped in devising a strategy to negotiate the best terms possible for the Hudson's Bay Company. John Shepherd was the only person ever to have been appointed both the Chairman of the East India Company and Governor of the Hudson's Bay Company. The former at that time had trading influence over one fifth of the world's population and governed most of the subcontinent of India, whilst the latter owned 3,000,000 square miles of North America and was the largest land owner in the world. No other person has ever, in a commercial capacity, governed or been ultimately directly responsible for, so much of the world or such a large proportion of the world's population as John Shepherd was as a result of his appointments to the most senior positions in these two companies. Shepherd was Deputy Master of the Corporation of Trinity House.

He died on 12 January 1859 at Mansfield St. London.
