= Henry St George Tucker (financier) =

Henry St George Tucker (1771–1851) was an English financier and official of the East India Company. He was Accountant General in 1801 and again in 1805, and was Chairman of the Company in 1834 and 1847.

== Personal life ==
Henry St. George Tucker was born on 15 February 1771 on the island of St. George, Bermuda. He was the eldest son of Henry Tucker (secretary and then later, President of the Council of the Bermudas) and his wife, Frances, daughter of the Governor of Bermuda George Bruere. Tucker married Jane, daughter of Robert Boswell, WS, who was a near relation of James Boswell. Tucker states in a biographical account that he was eldest of ten sons and had one sister.

Among his brothers were: Lt-Col George Tucker, Assistant-Adjutant-General under Sir Arthur Wellesley, who died in the wreck of HMS Primrose 22 January 1809; Lt-Col John G. P. Tucker; Captain Nathaniel B. Tucker, Brigade-Major to Sir Miles Nightingale, also died in the Primrose; Lt-Col William Tucker Hon.E.I.Co. Deputy-Quartermaster-General at the Presidency of Bombay, also died at sea; Major Charlton B. Tucker, served as aide-de-camp to Sir M. Nightingale when Commander-in-Chief of the army at Bombay; Richard Alexander Tucker, who was Chief-Justice at Newfoundland.

In 1806 Tucker was sentenced to six months imprisonment for attempted rape.

== Career ==
Military Secretary to Lord Wellesley in 1799.

Accountant General in 1801-4 under Lord Wellesley and again in 1805 under Lord Cornwallis.

Chief Secretary in the Revenue and Judicial Department to the government in Calcutta.

In 1815 he went on leave to St Helena. Lord Moira selected Tucker to be Governor of Java, but he never returned to the East.

In 1826 Tucker was elected a Director of the East India Company, and in 1834 he was elected Chairman and again in 1847. He resigned as a Director in April 1851, and died in June of the same year. He is buried at Kensal Green Cemetery.

== Publications ==
- Remarks on the Plans of Finance lately promulgated by the Court of Directors and by the Supreme Government of India. London 1821.
- A Review of the Financial Statement of the East India Company in 1824. London 1825.
- Tragedies: Harold and Camoens. London 1835.

== Biographical works ==
- "Trial of Henry St. George Tucker". 1810.
- "Memorials of Indian Government being a selection from the papers of Henry St. George Tucker" 1853. By Sir John William Kaye
- "The life and correspondence of Henry St. George Tucker" 1854. By Sir John William Kaye

== See also ==
- History of Bermuda

== Sources ==
- Kaye, John William (1854). The Life and Correspondence of Henry St. George Tucker. London: Richard Bentley.
