= Henry Lyell =

Businessman

Henry Lyell (1665–1731) was a businessman born in Sweden who settled in London. He was a director of the East India Company from 1710–1730 and served as Deputy Chairman of the company 1716–18, then as Chairman, 1718–1719, 1721–22, Deputy Chair again from 1725–26 and Chair again 1726–27.

Henry was the son of Henrik Patriksson Lyell (1627–1710) from Arbroath, Scotland and Judith Rokes (1647–1705) from Lübeck.
