= Elliot Macnaghten =

British official of the East India Company

Elliot Macnaghten (1807–1888) J.P, also known as Elliot Workman-Macnaghten, was a British official of the East India Company. He was its Chairman in 1855.

He was later a Member of the Supreme Court in Calcutta and Vice President of the India Council.

== Personal background ==
Macnaghten was the son of Sir Francis Workman-Macnaghten of Bushmills House (1836), in the county of Antrim; and was brother to Sir William Hay Macnaghten, 1st Baronet (1840) and Sir Edmund Charles Workman-Macnaghten, 2nd Baronet of Bushmills House, a barrister, a master in chancery in Bengal. He was educated at Rugby School.

Macnaghten was a J.P. He lived at Ovingdean House, Sussex.

== Career ==
Macnaghten was a member of the Supreme Court in Calcutta and was one of the original members of the India Council in 1858 and Vice President in 1866.

He was elected a Director of the Court of the East India Company in 1842 and in 1855 was Chairman.

== Family ==
Macnaghten married, firstly, Isabella (died 1871) only daughter of John Law. He was father of:

- Chester Macnaghten, fourth son (born 1843), the founding Principal of the Rajkumar College, Rajkot, the first English Boarding School built under Macaulay's Doctrine on Education in India.., after his tutorship of Lakshmeshwar Singh, then the Prince of Darbhanga, a minor.
- Henry Alexander Macnaghten, fifth son (born 1850), cleric.
- Sir Melville Leslie Macnaghten, sixth son (born 1853).

He married, secondly, in 1872, Annie Chester, daughter of George Chester of the Bengal Civil Service.

Macnaghten was the son of Sir Francis Workman-Macnaghten, knt. (later Sir Francis Workman-Macnaghten, 1st Baronet) of Bushmills House (1836), in the county of Antrim; and was brother to Sir William Hay Macnaghten, 1st Baronet (1840) and Sir Edmund Charles Workman-Macnaghten, 2nd Baronet of Bushmills House, a barrister a master in chancery in Bengal. He was educated at Rugby School.
