= Henry Willock =

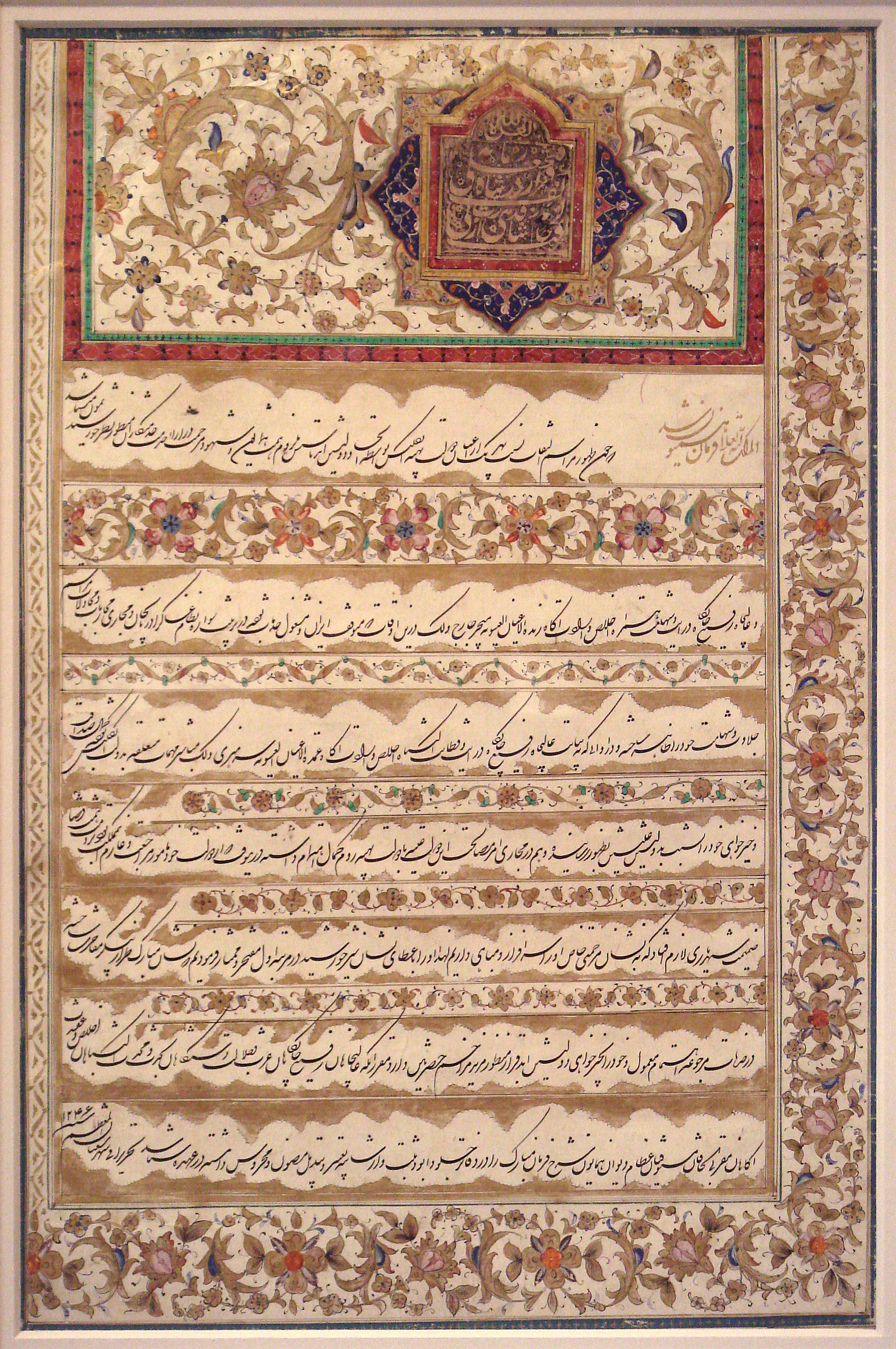
Fath Ali Shah Qajar honors George Willock (Henry's brother) with the Order of the Lion and the Sun

Sir Henry Willock (1790 – August 17, 1858) was a lieutenant-colonel and the British Envoy to Persia from 1815-1826. He was the chairman of the East India Company (EIC) in 1844–45. Willock married Elizabeth Davis, daughter of EIC Director and orientalist Samuel Davis, in 1826.
