= Laurence Sulivan =

Anglo-Irish politician

Laurence Sulivan (1713 – February 1786) was an Anglo-Irish politician who represented Taunton and Ashburton in the House of Commons of Great Britain from 1762 to 1774. He also served as the chairman of the East India Company. Sulivan was born in Ireland and moved to India to work for the East India Company, returning to England in 1753 with a moderate fortune, which enabled him to purchase Ponsbourne Park in Hertfordshire in 1761. He was elected as a director of the EIC for 1755–8, 1764–5, 1769–70, 1771–2, 1778–80 and 1783 to his death. He was deputy chairman of the EIC for 1763–4, 1772–3, 1780–1 and Chairman for 1758–9, 1760-2 and 1781–2. He had married in India and had two sons. Ponsbourne passed to his son Stephen, who sold it in 1811. His grandson, Laurence Sulivan (1783–1866) was a philanthropist, statesman and Deputy Secretary at War.

Parliament of Great Britain
Preceded by The Lord Carpenter	Member of Parliament for Taunton; 1762–1768	Succeeded by Alexander Popham
Preceded by Robert Palk	Member of Parliament for Ashburton; 1768–1774	Succeeded by Robert Palk
