= Chummy Fleming =

Australian unionist and anarchist

- Born: 1863; Derby, England
- Died: 25 January 1950 (aged 86); Melbourne, Victoria, Australia
- Known for: Unionism, oration and anarchism

John William 'Chummy' Fleming (1863 – 25 January 1950) was a pioneer unionist, agitator for the unemployed, and anarchist in Melbourne, Victoria, Australia.

"Chummy" Fleming was instrumental in starting May Day celebrations and marches in Melbourne. He was a member of the Melbourne Anarchist Club which formed on 1 May 1886, the first formal anarchist organisation in Australia. In 1899 he was elected to the Trades Hall Eight Hours Day committee and to the executive of Trades Hall Council. He was President of the Fitzroy Political Labor League, the forerunner to an Australian Labor Party branch. For more than sixty years he was a regular speaker at the Queens Wharf and Yarra Bank speakers corners on Sundays.

== Early life ==
He was born in Derby, England in 1863 to an Irish father, employed as a weaver, and an English mother, employed as a factory hand. His maternal grandfather had been involved in the Corn Laws struggles, and his father was active in strikes in Derby. His mother died when 'Chummy' was five. At the age of 10 he was sent to work in a Leicester boot factory, which took its toll on the boy's health, and gave him a personal understanding of social injustice. In his teens he attended Freethought lectures of Charles Bradlaugh, George Jacob Holyoake and Annie Besant.

At the invitation of an uncle living in Melbourne, he migrated to Australia in 1884, gaining immediate work as a bootmaker and joining the Victorian Operative Bootmakers Union. Almost immediately he involved himself in radical politics by attending the second annual Secular Conference in Sydney in 1884, organised by the Australasian Secular Association. In Melbourne he started attending Queens Wharf and North Wharf Sunday afternoon meetings at the Yarra River where popular speakers included Joseph Symes, President of the Australasian Secular Association, Monty Miller, a veteran radical from the Eureka Stockade, and William Trenwith, an aspirant labour politician.

== Sunday Liberation ==
In late 1889, Fleming was an organiser of the Sunday Liberation Society, and addressed meetings on the need to open the Public Libraries and Museums on Sundays. The Public Library had closed on Sundays due to church pressure. At a meeting near the Working Men's College (now known as Royal Melbourne Institute of Technology), a large crowd gathered. A deputation of five was appointed to visit Parliament House to petition for the Libraries and Museums to open on Sunday. When the deputation left, the crowd followed. The police failed to stop the estimated 6,000 people surging along the street, then up the steps of Parliament, where they finally stopped at the closed doors of Parliament.

Several of the organisers received summonses for 'taking part in an unlawful procession' and were imprisoned for a month. The campaign was successful, but numbers attending the Library on Sunday were insufficient, and the Library soon closed its doors on Sunday.

Fleming's time in prison was not unproductive. While detained he studied the prison regulations and found that the sanitary arrangements were less than required. So, he stopped the Governor on his weekly rounds, 'lectured him for an hour' whereupon the Governor ordered immediate improvements.

== Union agitation ==
In 1889, Fleming helped form a Melbourne lodge of the Knights of Labor in Melbourne, as well as being elected to the Eight Hours Committee.

In September, 1890 Fleming was first elected as a delegate of the Victorian Operative Bootmakers Union to the Trades Hall Council, and later served on the Executive. He supported inter-colonial strikers, female organisation, and agitation for piece work rates as opposed to a minimum wage which the employers were after. Due to declining union membership, Fleming was instrumental in the Trades Hall Council devising union re-organisation, which resulted in a number of unions being brought into existence and many old ones strengthened. Often his support of grass roots initiatives, self-help and the unemployed put him at odds with trade union bureaucrats and Labor politicians such as William Trenwith, who he accused of 'working with blood-sucking capitalists.'

Twelve months later he was elected, unopposed, President of his union for a 6-month term, and for a similar period as President of the Fitzroy branch of the Progressive Political League, the fore-runner of the ALP. Fleming was a supporter of Max Hirsch, author of Democracy versus Socialism.

At a Knights of Labor meeting in 1893, Fleming moved the motion for what was subsequently the first May Day procession in Melbourne. This was the start of a long association between Chummy Fleming and May Day in Melbourne. During the 1930s, when Fleming's anarchist politics was out of favour with the May Day Committee, then controlled by the Communist Party of Australia, Fleming started marching a block ahead with his red flag with Anarchy emblazoned in white, going so slowly the march caught up with him; or sometimes he started back In the ranks and gradually edged to the front.

In 1895, at a large meeting at the Melbourne Town Hall, Fleming and John White moved a motion successfully opposing the Melbourne Lord Mayor, Sir Arthur Snowden, from chairing the meeting because of remarks he had made supporting very low wages. A commentator in The Tocsin articulated that it forced words to become deeds and resulted in the introduction of the Factories Legislation.

In 1904 Fleming was expelled from Trades Hall Council for attacks on Labor parliamentarians (disloyalty to Labor). Fleming's continual criticism of Trades Hall bureaucrats and Labor opportunists was echoed by noted Trade Unionist and socialist, Tom Mann.

== Unemployed agitation ==
Fleming spent many periods unemployed and was active in unemployed agitation. Many Trade Unions and Trades Hall officials were not sympathetic to unemployed agitation at this time. Fleming described one occasion:

"...The unemployed meeting was held on a piece of land near the Workingmen's College. At the conclusion of the meeting, old John White and I carried the calico banner which had written on it: Feed on our flesh and blood, Capitalist hyena; it is your funeral feast. When the unemployed arrived at the Trades Hall they were attacked by unionists. During the fight the banner was destroyed. The police came and ended the fight ..."

In 1908, as part of an unemployed agitation, Fleming and Percy Laidler, a Marxist, led the unemployed into Federal Parliament in Melbourne, stopping it for one and a half hours.

== Melbourne Anarchist Club ==
On 1 May 1886 the first meeting of the Melbourne Anarchist Club took place attended by Fleming, Monty Miller, Jack Andrews, David Andrade and several others. In club meetings he gave lectures on 'The Subjection of Women', and the need for sexual freedom in a talk on 'Marriage, Prostitution and the Whitechapel Murders'. He was not noted as a writer or philosopher, but remained on good terms with mutualists, individualists and communist anarchists active in the club. His union and unemployed agitation showed him to be more practical and pragmatic in his adherence to anarchism.

He is recorded as having regular correspondence with noted anarchists, Peter Kropotkin, Emma Goldman, and Max Nettlau and many others. For every year from 1887 he commemorated in Melbourne the execution of the Haymarket Riot Martyrs.

On being expelled from Trades Hall Council in 1904, Fleming became heroic and made the following statement:

"... I am going to be expelled because I am an anarchist. I am in the company of Tolstoy, Spencer and the most advanced thinkers of the world. Workers will never get their rights while they look to Parliament. A general strike would be more effective than all the Parliaments in the world. I have got a fine stick and I am going to use It. Expel me if you like. I am an anarchist. We have been hanged in Chicago, electrocuted in New York, guillotined in Paris and strangled in Italy, and I will go with my comrades. I am opposed to your Government and to your authority. Down with them. Do your worst. Long live Anarchy".

For the next forty five years Fleming helped organise or was involved with anarchist meetings in Melbourne.

== The Anarchist and the Governor-General ==
From 1901 an interesting friendship developed between Chummy Fleming and Lord Hopetoun, Australia's first Governor-General. In May 1901 Fleming protested unemployment in Melbourne by rushing onto the Prince's Bridge to halt the Governor General's carriage. Hopetoun told the police not to interfere and listened to Fleming put the case for the unemployed. Out of this encounter came a friendship which endured after Hopetoun returned to England in July 1902. While in Australia, he is said to have visited Chummy's house at 6 Argyle Place, Carlton, which was built with money he lent Chummy, the house bearing the name 'Hopetoun' when completed (since demolished). According to some reports, Hopetoun is credited with pressuring the government to speed up government work projects.

Upon Hopetoun's impending departure, he donated money and 25 dozen bottles of champagne, entrusted to Fleming, for distribution to the unemployed. Several commentators of the period saw this as a round-about slap at the establishment for refusing to pay Hopetoun what he thought he needed. Fleming duly distributed the gifts to the unemployed according to a register: One shilling to each married man and 6d to each single man who attended on 24 June 1902. The following day the bottles of Champagne, along with beer from 6 hogsheads donated by Shamrock Brewery, were distributed by Fleming, (who neither smoked or drank). According to newspaper reports drunkenness and riots ensued.

"A representative of "The Age" asked Mr Fleming why the wine had not been sold and the money distributed. His reply was perhaps characteristic. He said: "We are tired of the inequalities among the people. The rich drink champagne and the poor small beer. Besides, it would have been a breach of faith to his Lordship to have sold the wine". When "The Age" reporter pointed to the drunken mob outside, and asked if that was the equality he meant, Mr Fleming could only say that such a thing as the distribution of champagne had never occurred before in Australia, and that champagne was not intended only for dainty stomachs." (The Age, 26 June 1902)

== "Rich Man's War and the Poor Man's Fight" ==
Fleming was active in the conscription debates during the first World War, being with the Industrial Workers of the World prepared to take a definite anti-war stance. In Port Melbourne Town Hall for example, he spoke on "the Rich Man's War and the Poor Man's Fight." During this period he was frequently arrested, jailed and threatened with being deported by the authorities, or thrown into the river by roughs and on at least one occasion was thrown in.

In 1933, he was invited to make a speech at the Congress Against War and Fascism, organised largely by the Communist Party of Australia. It was reported that he took the organisers to task for their doctrinaire approach, and was heavily criticised for it.

== Yarra Banker ==
Fleming became an institution as a speaker on the Yarra Bank on Sundays. From 1901 until he died in 1950, each Sunday he would set up his Freedom stand, conducting meetings and lecturing on social questions, working conditions and other issues. He announced his meetings with a cow bell, behind him would be draped two red flags: one with 'Anarchy' and the other with 'Freedom' worked on white.

On May Day in 1950, after his death, the ashes of Chummy Fleming were scattered among the crowd on the Yarra Bank. He was remembered for his sincerity, courageousness, and dedication to the Australian labour movement.

== See also ==
- Anarchism in Australia
