= David Andrade =

David Andrade may refer to:

- David Andrade (anarchist) (1859–1928), Australian anarchist and individualist
- David Andrade (footballer) (born 1993), Mexican footballer
