= The Abrolhos tragedy =

English translation of 1647 account of Batavia shipwrecking

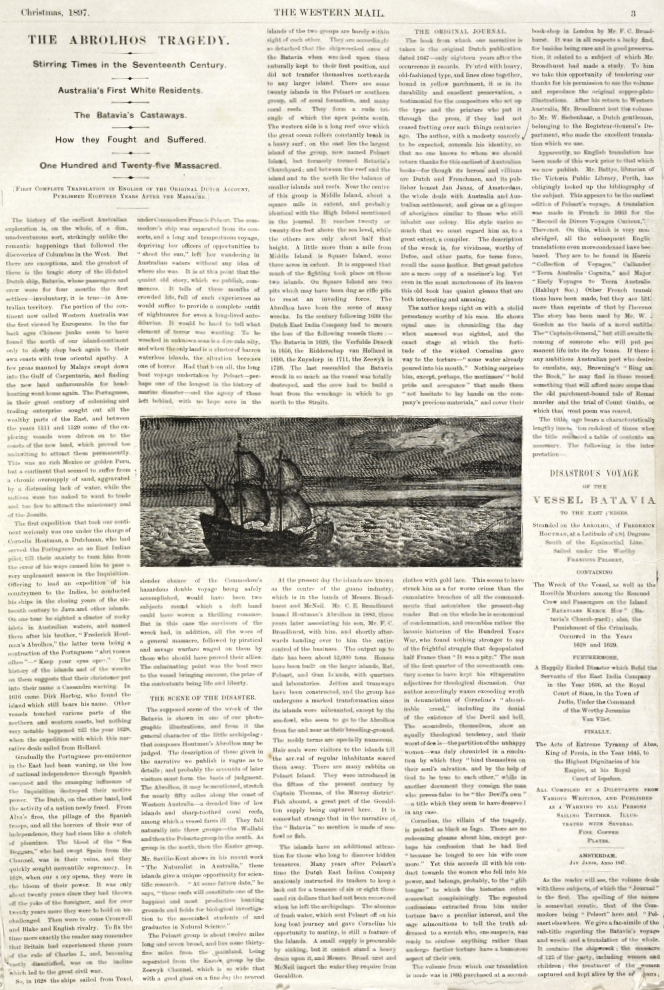

The Abrolhos tragedy is the only English translation of Isaac Commelin's 1647 Ongeluckige voyagie, van't schip Batavia, which was the first published account of the 1629 shipwreck of Batavia in the Houtman Abrolhos, and the subsequent mutiny and massacre that occurred amongst the survivors.

The translation came about after Florance Broadhurst, who was managing a guano mining operation in the Houtman Abrolhos, acquired a first edition of Ongeluckige voyagie, and commissioned Willem Siebenhaar to translate it. The translations was eventually published in the 1897 "Christmas Edition" of Western Australia's The Western Mail.

The Abrolhos tragedy is credited with having greatly increased interest in the Batavia incident in Australia. Specifically, Henrietta Drake-Brockman credits it with having fed her fascination with the incident – a fascination that ultimately resulted in her undertaking and publishing research that was key to the discovery of the wreck.

== See also ==
- Wiebbe Hayes

== General references ==
- Drake-Brockman, Henrietta (1995). Voyage to Disaster (2nd ed.). Nedlands: University of Western Australia Press. ISBN 1-920694-72-2.
- "The Abrolhos tragedy". The Western Mail. Vol. 12, no. 624. Western Australia. 10 December 1897. pp. 56– – via National Library of Australia.
