= Florance Broadhurst =

19th-century Western Australian businessman

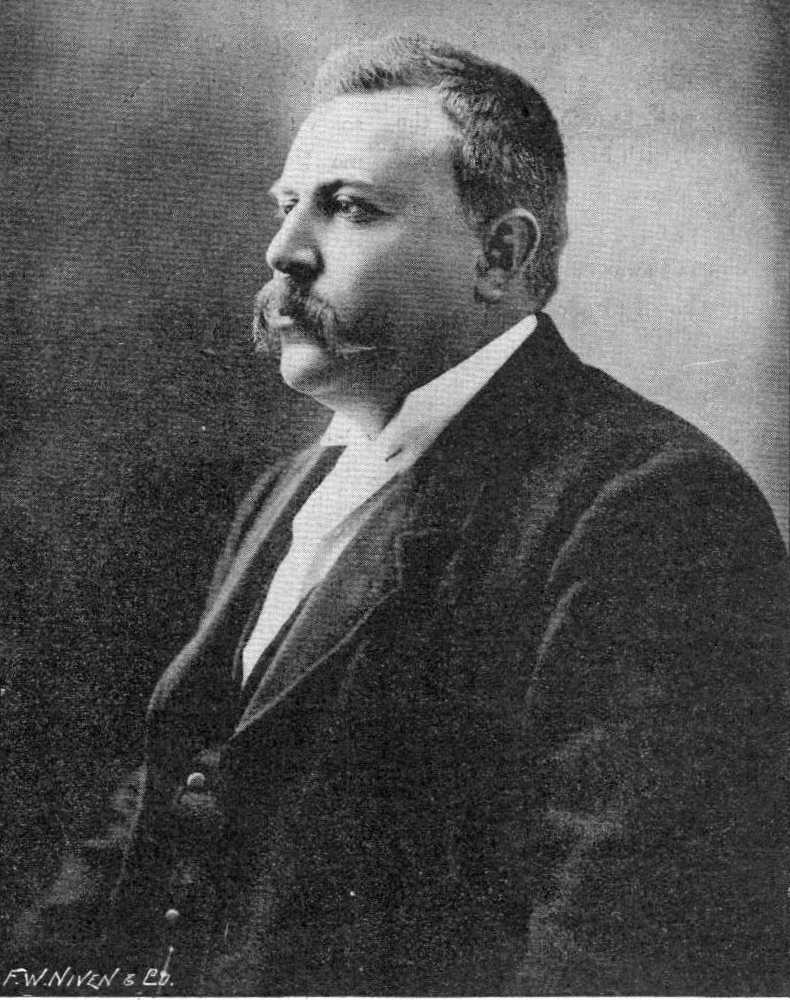
Florance C Broadhurst

Florance Constantine Broadhurst (1861–1909) was a 19th-century Western Australian businessman who is most notable for successfully taking over the management of a number of business ventures of his ill-fortuned, yet extremely creative and hard-working father, Charles Edward Broadhurst, and turning a profit. The best known of these is the guano mining venture in the Houtman Abrolhos. While his entrepreneur father had recognised the potential of the industry and began mining, eventually to obtain a monopoly on the extraction of the guano, he proved unsuccessful in managing the concern. This situation continued until Florance, who had a mercantile education, joined the concern and began managing the venture under the name Broadhurst MacNeil and Company. MacNeil was initially a backer and a partner, but he took no part in the management of the venture. With his accountancy training, Broadhurst proved enormously successful exporting to Europe and winning a gold medal at the Paris Exposition.

While working the deposits on Gun Island, his labourers found a large number of artifacts that he believed to be relics of the 1629 Batavia shipwreck. He developed an interest in the wreck, and eventually obtained a copy of Isaac Commelin's 1647 Ongeluckige voyagie, van't schip Batavia, the Dutch publication that first popularised the Batavia incident. He commissioned Willem Siebenhaar to translate it, and this resulted in what is still the only English translation, entitled The Abrolhos tragedy. Broadhurst maintained a catalogue of his finds, which he donated to the state. These were eventually shown to be related not to the Batavia, but the Dutch East India Company ship Zeewijk, which was wrecked off Gun Island in 1727. A friend of his children, Henrietta Drake-Brockman, came to learn of the Dutch wrecks while around the family home, and she became an acknowledged force in the eventual location of the Batavia wreck and its survivors' campsite. Though a great success, in 1904 Broadhurst lost the monopoly to the guano industry.

== General references ==
- Drake-Brockman, Henrietta (1995). Voyage to Disaster (2nd ed.). Nedlands: University of Western Australia Press. ISBN 1-920694-72-2.
- McCarthy, Mike (1992). "Failure and Success: the Broadhursts and the Abrolhos Guano Industry". Private Enterprise, Government and Society (studies in Western Australian History Xiii). Centre for Western Australian History, Department of History, University of Western Australia. ISBN 0-86422-206-8.
