= Peter MacGregor =

Peter MacGregor may refer to:

- Peter MacGregor (Michigan politician) (born 1966), Republican politician from Michigan
- Peter MacGregor (Queensland politician) (1866–1936), member of the Queensland Legislative Assembly
- Peter MacGregor Chalmers (1859–1922), Scottish architect
- Peter MacGregor-Scott (1947–2017), British film producer, production manager, and assistant director

== See also ==
- Peter McGregor (1947–2008), Australian anarchist
- Peter McGregor (cricketer) (born 1941), New Zealand former cricketer
