= Mary Finlay =

Mary Finlay may refer to:

- Mary Lou Finlay (born 1947), Canadian radio and television journalist
- Mary McKenzie Finlay (1870–1923), Australian army nurse and school matron
- Mary Finlay Geoghegan (born 1949), née Finlay, Irish judge and lawyer
