= Grey Street =

Grey Street may refer to:

- "Grey Street" (song), a 2002 Dave Matthews Band song from The Lillywhite Sessions and from the studio album Busted Stuff
- Grey Street, Melbourne, a street in the red-light district of Melbourne, Australia
- Grey Street, Brisbane, the main shopping and dining esplanade of Brisbane's South Bank cultural precinct
- Grey Street, Newcastle, a street in Newcastle upon Tyne, England, known for its Georgian architecture
- Grey Street (Road), one of the oldest roads in then Calcutta (now Kolkata)
