= New Waver =

- Origin: Melbourne, Victoria, Australia
- Genres: Alternative rock; hard rock; alternative dance
- Years active: 1990–1999
- Label: Spill
- Past members: Greg Wadley; Peter Jetnikoff

New Waver was an Australian satirical musical project developed by Greg Wadley in 1990. It grew out of Wadley's prior projects, a zine Loser, a mock political action group, Campaign Against Uninteresting Shops in Brunswick Street and a fictitious tribute band, Christmas Party.

== History ==
New Waver was founded by Greg Wadley in 1990 in Melbourne. Wadley, on bass guitar, was a founding member of Tex Perkins' Brisbane-formed cowpunk band, Tex Deadly and the Dum Dums, in 1982. Fellow member Peter Jetnikoff provided guitar. They relocated to Sydney but disbanded in the following year. Wadley established the Losercorp project in the 1980s, which published a zine Loser (1987–1992) under the pseudonyms A Loser and Arthur Protestant, formed a mock political action group, Campaign Against Uninteresting Shops in Brunswick Street and a fictitious tribute band, Christmas Party.

New Waver, was the music project of Wadley, which has a similar pessimistic outlook to Losercorp's earlier efforts, underwritten with Darwinism. Its music consists of electronic elements (from synthesisers, samplers and drum machines), along with samples from TV nature programmes, advertisements and audio books by Richard Dawkins, selectively chosen to reinforce the bleak, fatalistic message, coupled with dark humour. The New Waver world view extends the survival of the fittest hypothesis to the social ladder present in modern urban and suburban culture. The songs feature both cover versions and parodies of well-known songs with lyrics altered to reflect their world view, as well as instrumentals populated with samples and loops. The term "New Waver" is 1980s-vintage pejorative Queensland slang for a male who is interested in music, rather than football, and thus deserving of harassment or violence. "New Waver" also became a term for those who were fans of new wave music throughout the 1980s.

New Waver issued their first music cassette, Middle Class Man, in 1990. According to a reviewer for Radiation from Space Magazine, it is "esoteric, weird and wild keyboard and samples, blended with drums, bass and odd guitar they created a hypnotic groove." The title track is a parody of "Working Class Man" (1985) by Jimmy Barnes, while "Teabreak" relates to AC/DC's "Jailbreak" (1976).

In 1998, the band was one of many in the music video "Thunderbirds Are Coming Out" by fellow Australian band TISM. For New Waver's album, The Defeated (1999), Zyklatt provided drum loops. Most of its original tracks were written by Wadley however, former bandmate, Jetnikoff wrote the track, "Struggle for Hogwash", for the album. In 2006 a compilation album, Neuters, was issued, its "music consisted of dinky covers of Top 40 hits with the lyrics changed to address the life of the office loser." Guy Blackman of The Age described the band's members, "two unassuming public-servant types lurking behind cheesy synthesisers, with a singer who began most gigs naked, putting on an item of clothing after each song in a deadpan inversion of rock'n'roll behaviour." There is an interview with Wadley in Iain McIntyre and Mike Munro's book, How to Make Trouble and Influence People (2009).

== Discography ==
- Middle Class Man (cassette, 1990)
- Hard Drivin' Beat (cassette, 1991)
- Perverted by Wheat (cassette, 1991)
- Low Self Opinion (cassette, 1992)
- Live 'n' Lossy (cassette, 1993)
- "What a Man" (cassette single, 1994)
- Aspects of Loserdom (cassette, 1994)
- Mr Loser-Boozer Goes to Town (cassette, 1996)
- Darwin Junior High (vinyl EP, 1997)
- Bohemian Suburb Rhapsody (album, 1998)
- The Defeated (CD, 1999) – Endearing Records
- Computer World (mp3 album, 2001)
- Neuters (CD compilation album, 2006) – Dual Plover/Spill Records
