= Eildon Mansion =

Mansion in Melbourne, Australia

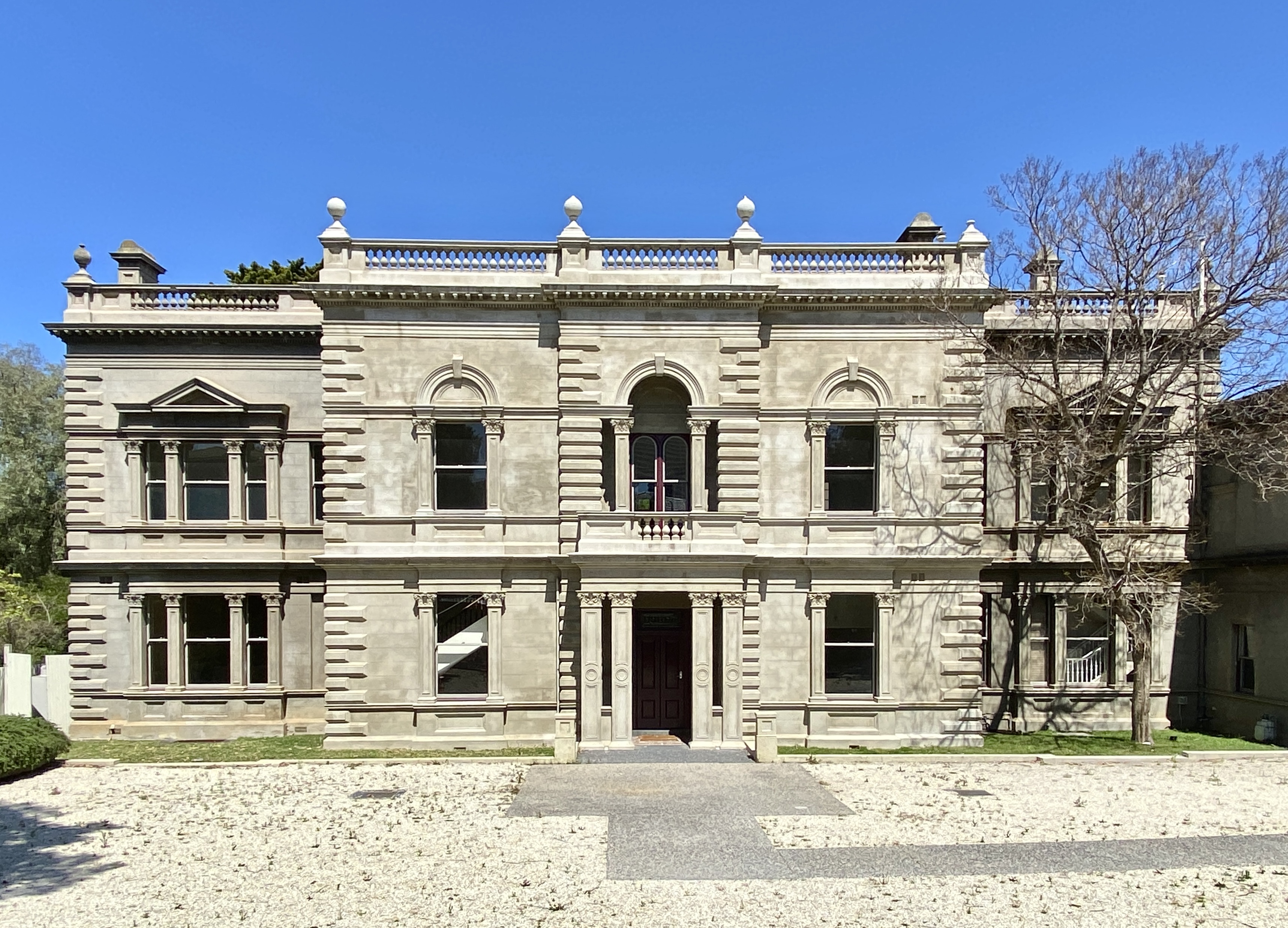
Eildon Mansion, 2025

Eildon Mansion is a Renaissance Revival-style mansion in Grey Street, St Kilda, Melbourne. It is the largest house in the suburb and is listed on the Victorian Heritage Register.

It began as Barham House, built in 1850 for Edward Bernard Green, then was altered and enlarged in 1872 to the design of Reed & Barnes for pastoralist John Currie and renamed Eildon.

By 1917, it was a guesthouse; the grounds were greatly reduced in 1921, and again in the 1950s when it became a boarding house. It became the home of the Alliance Francaise in 2006, who sold it in early 2022, and the new owners put it up for sale again in 2023.

== History ==
Prominent land owner Edward Green (1809–1861) purchased the large site in the late 1840s, when St Kilda was a seaside village far from the fledgling town of Melbourne. In 1850, he built a Regency-style house, named Barham, to the designs of architect John Gill.

In 1869, wealthy pastoralist John Lang Currie (1818–1898) purchased the property and greatly enlarged it in 1872, to the designs of Joseph Reed, of the leading Melbourne architectural firm of Reed & Barnes (who also later designed the nearby Church of the Sacred Heart and many other prominent Melbourne buildings, such as the Royal Exhibition Building). Currie was one of Victoria's most significant pastoralists and he created the house for his retirement in what was, by then, the seaside suburb of Melbourne's wealthy.

John Currie liked to take visitors for walks to the beach, then stroll back through his wonderful garden to Eildon, where they could admire the bayside face of the house. John Currie's daughter Henrietta had her marriage celebrations in the ballroom at Eildon Mansion. John Currie also leased Osborne house in Geelong, and had Larra House and Gala house which are both in Camperdown in Victoria. The Larra property was an important property for John Currie, as this is where his success a pastoralist was established.

John Currie died on March 11, 1898, and his tomb can be found at the St Kilda Cemetery. He left an estate of £479,000 to his wife Louise and his 5 sons and 3 daughters. Louise died in 1901, but the property stayed in the family until at least 1917, when the first ads for it as a guesthouse appeared. The southern end was sold off in 1921 and subdivided, with an access road, now the southern part of Eildon Road.

From 1951, it was owned by Mr. Ferit Ymer and his wife Qerime. In 1953, they sold off the last portion of the grounds, creating Newton Court, with three blocks, two quite close to the rear of the house. They raised their 6 children there, while they operated the home as a boarding house, accommodating mainly single men, including newly arrived migrants. In the later years, the rents they could charge declined, as did maintenance on the building. Two of the owner's sons, Enver and Danny, undertook extensive restorations in 2004, converting the house into backpackers accommodation, but sold it in 2006. The Ymer family held Eildon Mansion for over 56 years.

The house was bought for a reported $4 million by the Alliance Française for their new Melbourne headquarters, moving from nearby Robe Street and spending well over $1.5 million on renovations. They removed the partitions from the 1930s that subdivided the larger rooms and set up the mansion for their workshops, French classes, library, and a theatre room where the main kitchen used to be. They also restored the ballroom, which was used for functions and exhibitions.

In early 2022, the Alliance Française sold the property for a reported $9 million to couple Gary Singer and Geoffrey Smith, who run an art and antiques auction house. In late 2023, after external repairs and refurbishment, they put the mansion up for sale again.

== Description ==
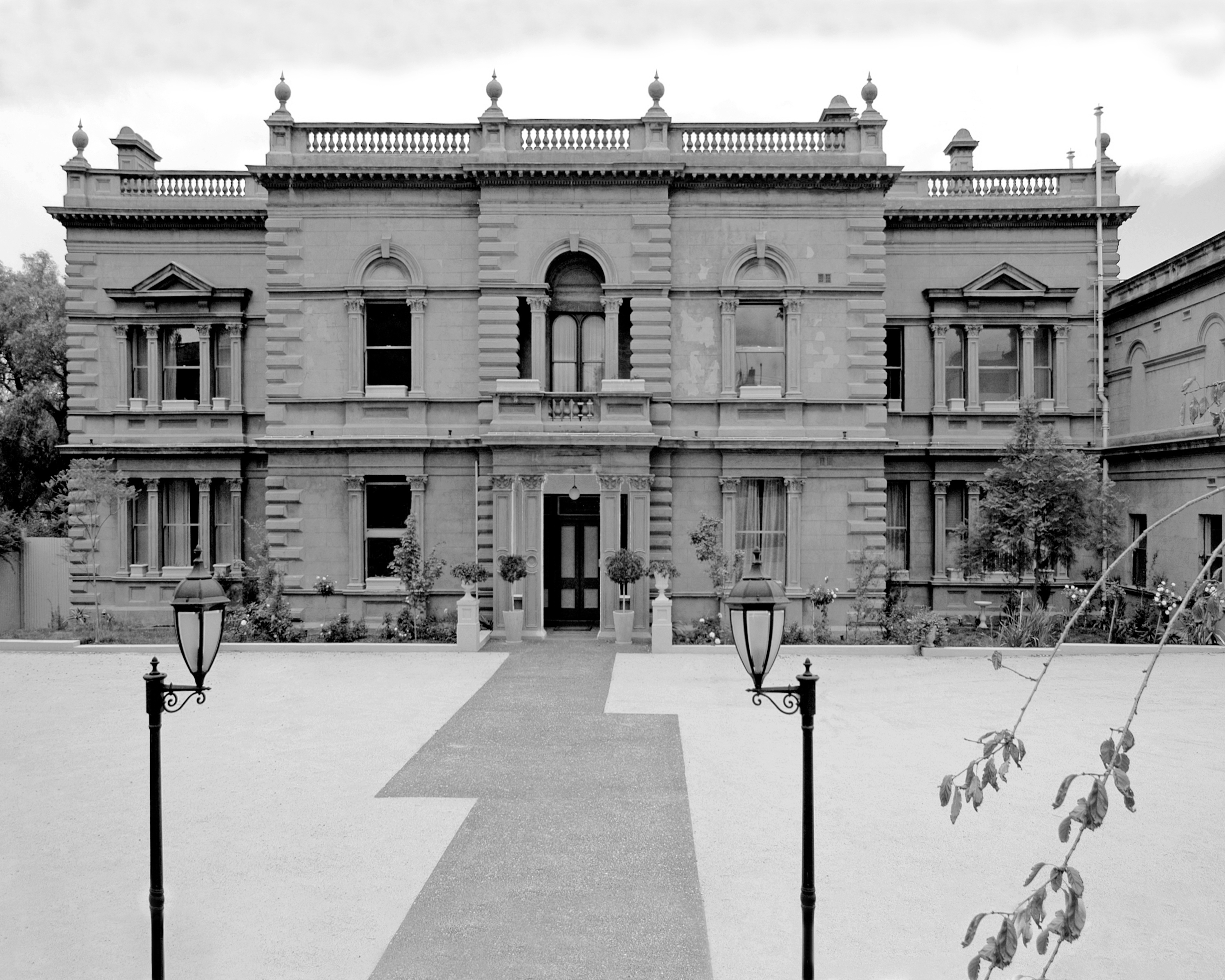
Eildon Mansion in 2010

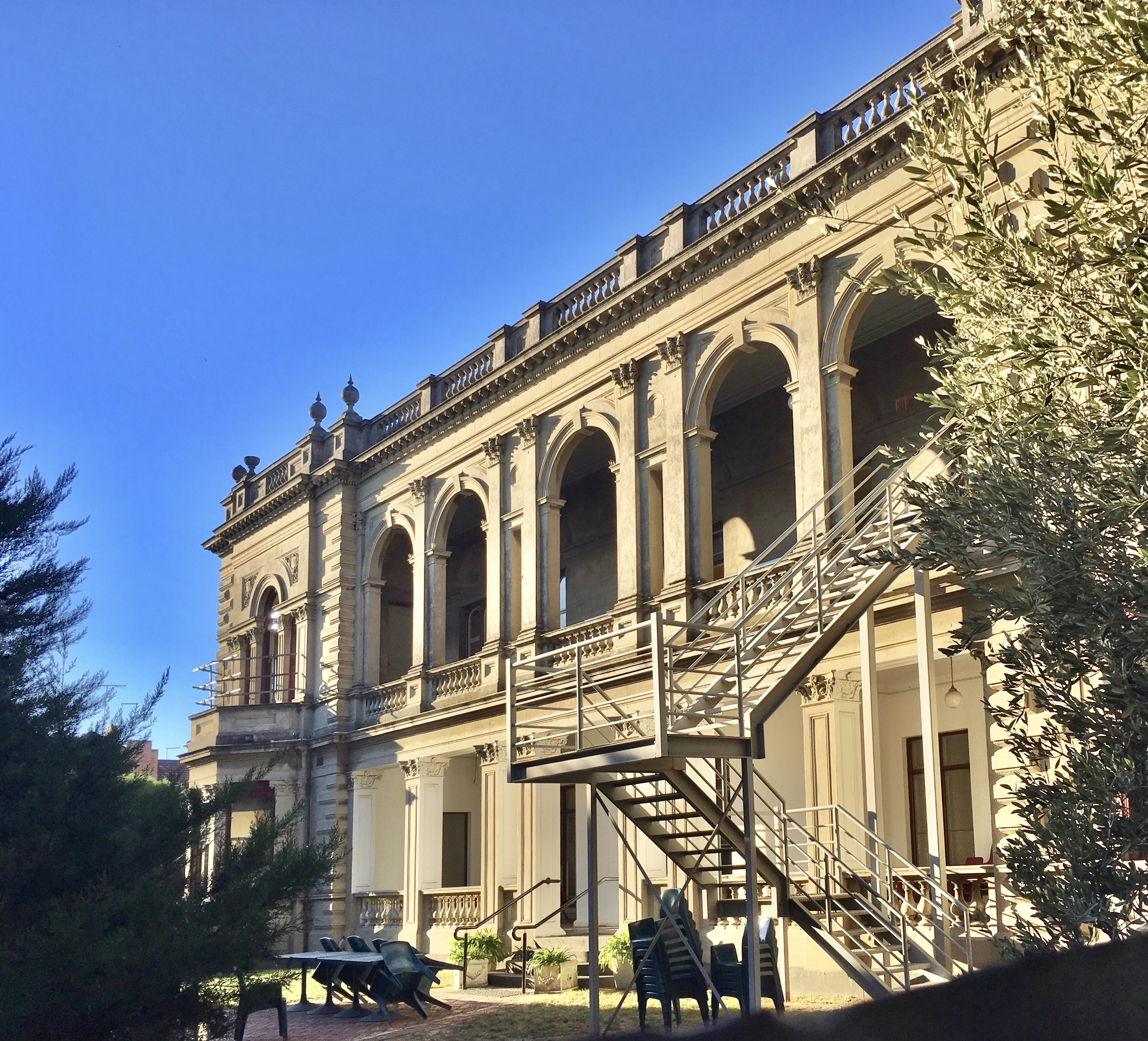
Rear facade facing the bay

The layout of the house clearly shows its history with the central part retaining the walls of Barham, with long wings added either side, a loggia joining them to the rear, and new facades. The architecture is Renaissance Revival, featuring pilasters flanking the windows, some with arches, those on the added wings in the form of Palladian windows with pediments, a balustraded cornice, and the most striking feature on the entrance side being the deep, wide quoins in each corner of each projecting bay. The rear (garden) facade features matching detailing, bay windows on the added wings, and a double level loggia with full height piers, and pilasters and arcading.

The original site was somewhat wider and continued down to Church Square (almost to Acland Street). Photos of the property as a guesthouse show that the rear gardens were mostly lawn, most likely to allow views of the bay.

Though the "rear" facade is equally as grand as the Grey Street side, the latter was always the front entrance. The original stables can be seen beside the house on the right, on the Grey Street side. Like most large Victorian properties, the front entrance was a looped drive, with two gates to Grey Street. In the 1940s, a strip of the site to the south was bought by the next door property, reducing the entrance gates to one.

Despite the various uses, much of the grand interior of the building survived, including marble and timber mantelpieces, ceiling roses, the sweeping stairs, and large basement quarters for servants and a cellar.
