= The Tocsin =

Former newspaper in Australia

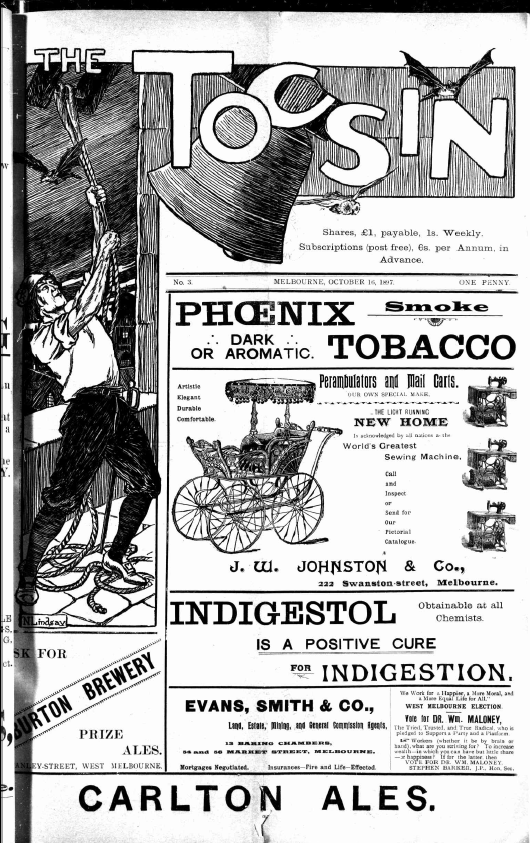
Masthead of The Tocsin No. 3, 16 October 1897

The Tocsin (often referred to only as Tocsin) was an Australian socialist newspaper, published from 1897 to 1906. It was co-founded by several prominent political figures, including Edward Findley, John Percy Jones and Bernard O'Dowd. Jack Castieau served as the first editor, while artist Norman Lindsay drew its first cover design.

Writers for the paper included Frank Anstey, Lilian Locke and Frank Wilmot, and John Arthur Andrews was editor for a time. Tocsin readers formed themselves into "Tocsin Clubs", conducting well-attended public meetings in various locations across Melbourne for political discussions. Co-founder Findley was expelled from the Victorian Legislative Assembly in 1901 after Tocsin was found to have libelled King Edward VII.

In the pre-federation era in Australia, Tocsin argued against Federation.

Tocsin was succeeded by the Labor Call.

It has been digitised by the National Library of Australia as part of the Trove project.
