= Anarchism in Australia =

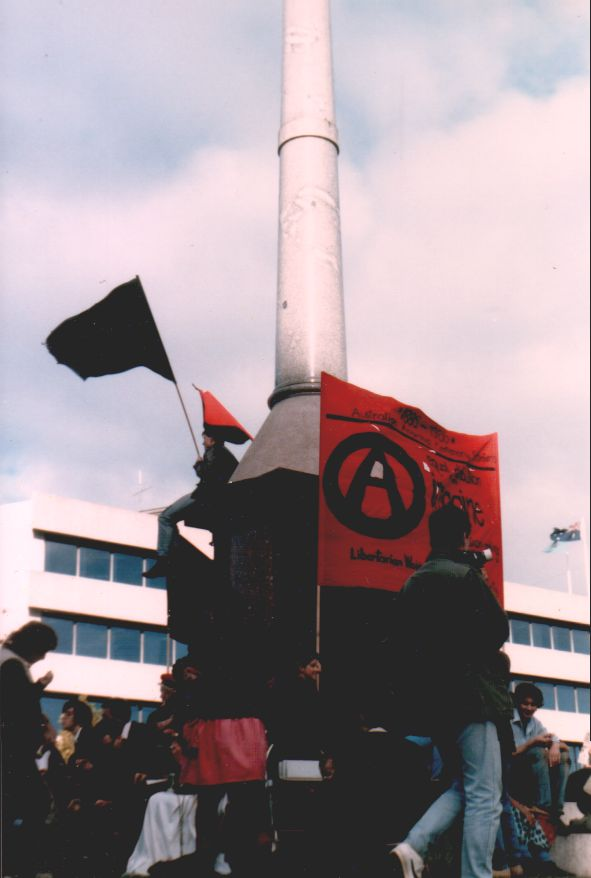
Anarchists celebrate 100 years of organisation at the Eight hour day Monument on May Day, 1986.

Anarchism in Australia arrived within a few years of anarchism developing as a distinct tendency in the wake of the 1871 Paris Commune. Although a minor school of thought and politics, composed primarily of campaigners and intellectuals, Australian anarchism has formed a significant current throughout the history and literature of the colonies and nation.

Anarchism's influence has been industrial and cultural, though its influence has waned from its high point in the early 20th century where anarchist techniques and ideas deeply influenced the official Australian union movement. In the mid 20th century anarchism's influence was primarily restricted to urban bohemian cultural movements.

In the late 20th century and early 21st century Australian anarchism has been an element in Australia's social justice and protest movements.

== History ==
=== Beginnings ===
The Melbourne Anarchist Club was officially founded on 1 May 1886 by David Andrade and others breaking away from the Australasian Secular Association of Joseph Symes, the journal Honesty being the anarchist club's official organ; and anarchism became a significant minor current on the Australian left. The current included a diversity of views on economics, ranging from an individualism influenced by Benjamin Tucker to the anarchist communism of JA Andrews. All regarded themselves as broadly "socialist" however. The Anarchists mixed with the seminal literary figures Henry Lawson and Mary Gilmore and the labour journalist and utopian socialist William Lane. The most dramatic event associated with this early Australian anarchism was perhaps the bombing of the "non-union" ship SS Aramac on 27 July 1893 by Australian anarchist and union organiser Larrie Petrie. This incident occurred in the highly charged atmosphere following the defeat of the 1890 Australian maritime dispute, the 1891 Australian shearers' strike and the 1892 Broken Hill miners' strike, an atmosphere which also produced the Sydney-based direct action group the "Active Service Brigade"

In 1894 and 1895, New South Wales authorities conducted a series of heavy-handed crackdowns and politically motivated trials directed at socialists and anarchists, sparked by public hysteria following the bombings and assassinations associated with the propaganda by the deed occurring in Europe. On 29 June 1894, anarchist writer John Arthur Andrews was imprisoned for publishing the pamphlet A Handbook of Anarchy, which lacked a legal printer's imprint. Despite providing his author details, Andrews and two men who sold the pamphlet were sentenced to three months in prison. Andrews would be further imprisoned for five months (plus two months on remand) for sedition in December 1894 over content published in The Revolt.

The Active Service Brigade was also targeted by authorities with the proprietors of Justice, the groups newspaper, being arrest and charged on two separate occasions. The 5 men, Henry Tregarthan Douglas, Thomas Dodd, John Dwyer, William Mason and George MacNevin were effectively the Brigade leadership. A charge of criminal libel, which arose from a single paragraph published in Justice on 21 April 1894 was brought against the proprietors on behalf of NSW Justice Minister Thomas Slattery in June 1894. They were found guilty on 13 June 1894 by Justice Sir Joseph George Long Innes in the Central Criminal Court. Douglas, Dodd, and Mason each received a nine-month sentence; Dwyer received six months and MacNevin one month. Long-Innes also ordered the prisoners sent to different prisons in an attempt to break up their association. The second a charge of seditious libel tending to incite murder for content published about the Bridge Street Affray was later brought against the men.

A major challenge to the principles of these early Australian anarchists was the virulent anti-Chinese racism of the time, of which racism William Lane himself was a leading exponent. On a political level the anarchists opposed the anti-Chinese agitation. "The Chinese, like ourselves, are the victims of monopoly and exploitation" editorialised Honesty "We had far better set to and make our own position better instead of, like a parcel of blind babies, trying to make theirs worse." The anarchists were sometimes more ambivalent on the subject than this statement of principle might suggest; anti-Chinese racism was entrenched in the labour movement of which they were a part, and challenged by few others.

=== World War I ===
Monty Miller, a veteran of the Eureka uprising, belonged to the Melbourne Anarchist Club. He would later become a well-known militant of the Australian branch of the Industrial Workers of the World (IWW) and was arrested and imprisoned in 1916. His friend the social activist and literary figure Willem Siebenhaar was among those who campaigned for his release.

The anarchist tradition was kept alive in Australia by, among others, the prominent agitator and street speaker Chummy Fleming who died in Melbourne in 1950 and by Italian Anarchists active in Melbourne's Matteotti Club and the North Queensland canefields. William Andrade (1863–1939), David Andrade's brother and fellow anarchist, became a successful bookseller in Sydney and Melbourne and while he retired from active politics in about 1920 he continued to influence events by allowing various radical groups to use his premises throughout the 1920s and 1930s.

=== Post-World War II ===
After World War Two the Sydney Libertarians developed a distinct brand of "pessimistic" or "permanent protest" anarchism, deeply sceptical of revolution and of any grand scheme of human betterment, yet friendly to the revolutionary unionism of the IWW. Poet Harry Hooton associated with this group, and his friend Germaine Greer belonged to it in her youth. By 1972 she was calling herself an "anarchist communist" and was still identifying herself as "basically" an anarchist in 1999. The Sydney Libertarians were the political tendency around which the "Sydney Push" social milieu developed, a milieu which included many anarchists.

The Sydney Libertarians, along with the remnant of the Australian IWW and of Italian and Spanish migrant anarchism fed into the Anarchist revival of the sixties and seventies which Australia shared with much of the developed world. Another post-war influence that fed into modern Australian anarchism was the arrival of anarchist refugees from Bulgaria. The most notable of these refugees was Jelesko Grancharoff, better known by his nickname Jack the Anarchist, who helped create the first Bulgarian anarchist groups in Sydney in the 1950s and in 1965, he founded the publication Red and Black with Sydney Push anarchists. It was named both because of the symbolism of these colours for anarchists and because the members had read Stendhal's The Red and the Black.

The last years of Australian involvement in the Vietnam war was an active period for Australian anarchists, the high-profile draft resister Michael Matteson in particular became something of a folk hero. The prolific anarchist poet Pi O began to write. The Brisbane Self-Management Group was formed in 1971, heavily influenced by the councillist writings of the Socialisme ou Barbarie group and its offshoots. The Anarchist Bookshop in Adelaide began publishing the monthly Black Growth. Anarchists active in inner-city Melbourne played a major part in creating the Fitzroy Legal Service (FLS) in 1972.

In 1974 after successfully campaigning against the 1971 South Africa rugby union tour of Australia Anti-apartheid movement activist Peter McGregor was one of several people who involved themselves in resurrecting the Sydney Anarchist Group to organise an Australian Anarchist conference in Sydney in January 1975. At the time anarchist theory was being intensely debated. A diverse Federation of Australian Anarchists (FAA) was formed at a conference in Sydney in 1975. A walkout from the second conference in Melbourne in 1976 led to the founding of the Libertarian Socialist Federation (LSF), which in 1977 led to the founding of Jura Books in Sydney.

The end of the 1970s saw the development of a Christian anarchist Catholic Worker tendency in Brisbane, the most prominent person in the group being Ciaron O'Reilly. This tendency exploded into prominence in 1982 because of its part along with other anarchists and assorted radicals in the Brisbane free speech fights during the Queensland premiership of Joh Bjelke-Petersen.

The Melbourne Anarchist Club celebrated its centennial in 1986 with a march of around 400 people that culminated in Bourke Street Mall with speakers.

The Australian section of the International Workers' Association (IWA), called the Anarcho-Syndicalist Federation (ASF), was active among Melbourne's public transport workers, influencing the 1990 Melbourne tram dispute.

In 2007, Australian anarchist Jock Palfreeman murdered a Bulgarian law student, Andrei Monov with a knife. Monov was the son of Bulgarian Socialist MP Hristo Monov, drawing condemnation from the Bulgarian Socialist Party. On 3 December 2009, he was sentenced to twenty years in prison for murder and fined 450,000 leva by a Sofia court.

On January 19, 2025, following a successful public forum the previous day, the Melbourne Anarchist Communist Group, Anarchist Communists Meanjin, and Geelong Anarchist Communists agreed to reconstitute themselves as branches of the Anarchist Communist Federation. On May 1 of the same year the Anarchist Communist Federation was officially launched.

Buddhist monk Bhante Sujato,a former musician with the Australian post punk alternative rock band Martha's Vineyard, has established a Buddhist Anarchist presence in Australia.

After leaving the lay life and spending many years in contemplation in ascetic training in remote Forest Hermitages in Thailand, he returned to Sydney to establish Lokanta Vihara (the Monastery at the End of the World), to explore what it means to follow the Buddha's teachings in an era of climate change, globalised consumerism, and political turmoil. He is also involved with Engaged Buddhism. In a Buddhist Dharma talk entitled I am an anarchist for Dhammanet, Sujato states his anarchist ideology, specifically aligning himself with anarcho-pacifism, which he explains as being compatible with the Buddha, Buddhism, lay man and lay women's practice and the renunciant life, as well as being in accord with the monastic vinaya. In the speech, Sujato explains his belief that the Buddha himself was also an anarchist.

Bhante Sujato was one of the main figures involved in the struggle, in the face of much opposition, to reintroduce the nun’s ordination lineage in Theravada Buddhism,successfully founding Santi Forest Monastery hermitage in Bundanoon, New South Wales, Australia, which has since flourished as a Bhikkhunī (Buddhist nun) monastery Vihara since 2012.

== See also ==
- Category: Australian anarchists
- List of anarchist movements by region
- Socialism in Australia
- How to Make Trouble and Influence People
- Mutiny Collective
- Anarchism in New Zealand
