= Montague Miller =

Montague David Miller, born 7 July 1839 in Van Diemen's Land (present day Tasmania), was an Australian trade unionist, secularist, and revolutionary anarchist-socialist chiefly active in the states of Victoria and, in his most productive period, in Western Australia. His activism with unions and the Industrial Workers of the World (IWW), during the early years of the twentieth century, saw him acting as a speaker and organiser for these sometimes illegal groups, leading to his conviction for conspiracy in 1916.

== Biography ==
Miller's parents took him to the Port Philip District (later known as Victoria), at the age of six weeks. They lived first at Port Fairy, and then moved to the Ballarat goldfields where Miller was apprenticed to a joiner. Miller's father was himself a carpenter. Miller would work at his trade throughout his life, as a contractor where possible to avoid having to work under a master, although he is also reported as having turned his hand to a variety of bush labour.

At the age of 15, Miller took part in the Eureka Rebellion – an uprising at Ballarat by self-employed miners, who were opposed to the policies of an authoritarian British colonial regime in Victoria. During the rebellion, he was involved in hand-to-hand fighting against members of the British 40th Regiment. Although the rebellion failed, it contributed to the introduction of democracy in Australia. Miller married in Ballarat at the age of twenty and shortly afterwards moved to Melbourne. He was early exposed to Chartist ideas which were influential in Ballarat at the time, and also early adopted his lifelong atheism. The building trades, to which Miller belonged, were at the forefront of early Victorian unionism.

His political career involved working with the unions and the Australian Labor Party, but he maintained a disillusioned view of political parties and structures, moving within the radical spectrum. He was a founding member of the Melbourne Anarchist Club in 1886. He appears to have moved to Perth in 1897, the end of an economic boom in the state, a period of political reformations and larger scale social change.

Monty Miller's tour, 1917

The Western Australian branch of the anarchist and socialist international movement, the Industrial Workers of the World, was founded by his friend Westwood and could accommodate his views. His membership in the later illegal organisation (the IWW - or 'Wobblies') brought about imprisonment and conviction in Perth, when he participated in the campaign opposing conscription. Tried along with a group of other men, his advanced age of over 80 made him perhaps one of the oldest to have been convicted on this charge. Many of his friends and colleagues were to assist in his defence, including Annie Westbrook and Willem Siebenhaar (sacked and consequently charged), and this high-profile case was to have a significant impact on the socialist and union movements and to the conscription debate. Miller was released after serving a few weeks of his sentence as the Judge had offered Miller, and another defendant, Sawtell, two years imprisonment or to be bound over for the same period to 'be of good behaviour and to keep the peace.' Miller was re-arrested in 1917 in Sydney at the age of 84 and sentenced to six months imprisonment with hard labour at Long Bay Gaol on the charge of belonging to an unlawful association. His Sydney arrest was apparently because he broke his bond.

In his last years he remained committed to theories of socialist society emerging in the youthful nation. Bitter post war divisions existed in Australia at that time, yet harassment by the media and suppression by conservative governments of political opposition did not dissuade Miller from promoting his revolutionary aims. He was buried at Karrakatta Cemetery, with the mourners singing the Red Flag at his funeral on 17 November 1920. Some critics and left wing historians have identified Miller as a hero for later communist or socialist causes in Australia. Certainly he was very non-sectarian in his activism. However the poet, Harry Hooton, claimed that Miller unambiguously identified as an anarchist, and Miller's friend and fellow Wobbly Annie Westbrook in her obituary also states this; early socialist movements had embraced the flourishing anti-authoritarian schools of Australian anarchism. Miller remained a committed atheist who believed decentralised socialism was an historical inevitability, contrasting the often theological or dialectical theory of his contemporaries.

He was survived by three daughters and one son, and by grandchildren, his wife and a second son having predeceased him.

== See also ==
- Anarchism in Australia
- Socialism in Australia
