= Peter McGregor =

Australian anarchist

Peter James McGregor (10 November 1947 – 11 January 2008) was an Australian anarchist known for his political activism, university teaching and commitment to direct action. He was actively involved in and led several major Australian and international political campaigns.

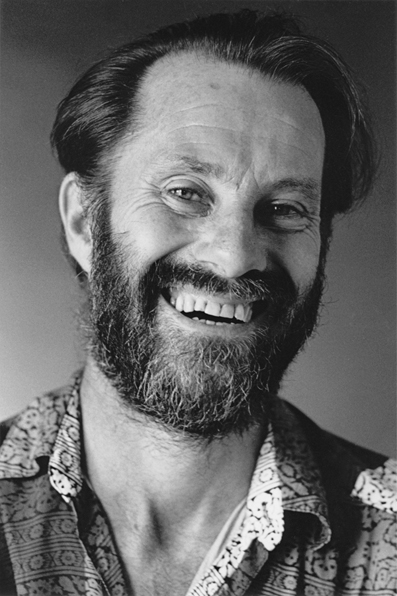
Peter McGregor 1991

== Political Activities and Campaigns ==
2006

- Opposition to WorkChoices Industrial Relations Legislation - Lone protest against Kevin Andrews (Federal Minister for Workplace Relations) and the Liberal Govt Workchoices IR legislation at Newcastle City Hall.

2007

- Citizens Arrest of Philip Ruddock for War Crimes - at a Seminar held by the Law Faculty of UNSW McGregor called on the police to arrest Philip Ruddock Federal Attorney General (a keynote speaker), for war crimes in Iraq. McGregor was arrested for 'unlawful entry on inclosed land....' but case was eventually dismissed.
- Citizens Arrest of Philip Ruddock (AG), John Howard (PM) & Alexander Downer (Foreign Minister) for War Crimes - tried to stand up in Federal Parliament & call for the arrest of these government pollies but was arrested. Case was later dismissed.

== Awards ==
His contributions to activism in the Vietnam anti-war movement and the Australian anti-apartheid movement which successfully disrupted the 1971 South Africa rugby union tour of Australia, as well as more recent activism such as his attempt to effect a citizen's arrest of Attorney General Philip Ruddock, for war crimes for Australia's involvement in the 2003 invasion of Iraq, were recognised by the Eureka Australia Medal award conferred by Dr Joseph Toscano and the Anarchist Media Institute at Bakery Hill, Ballarat on 3 December 2007.

== See also ==
- Anarchism in Australia
