= St Kilda Cemetery =

Australian cemetery in Victoria

- Interactive map of St Kilda Cemetery

Details
- Established: 1851
- Location: Dandenong Road, St Kilda East, Victoria
- Country: Australia
- Coordinates: 37°51′40″S 145°00′09″E
- Size: 18 acres (7.3 ha)
- No. of interments: 53,000
- Website: St Kilda Cemetery (Southern Metropolitan Cemeteries Trust)
- Find a Grave: St Kilda Cemetery

St Kilda Cemetery is located in the Melbourne suburb of St Kilda East, Victoria.

== History ==
St Kilda Cemetery covers a large block bordered by Dandenong Road, Hotham Street, Alma Road and Alexandra Street. It is bounded by a historic wall and contains many Victorian era graves. The cemetery is the resting place of Alfred Deakin, the second Prime Minister of Australia, five Premiers of Victoria, and Albert Jacka VC, MC, barrister and Mayor of St Kilda (1930).

== Notable interments ==
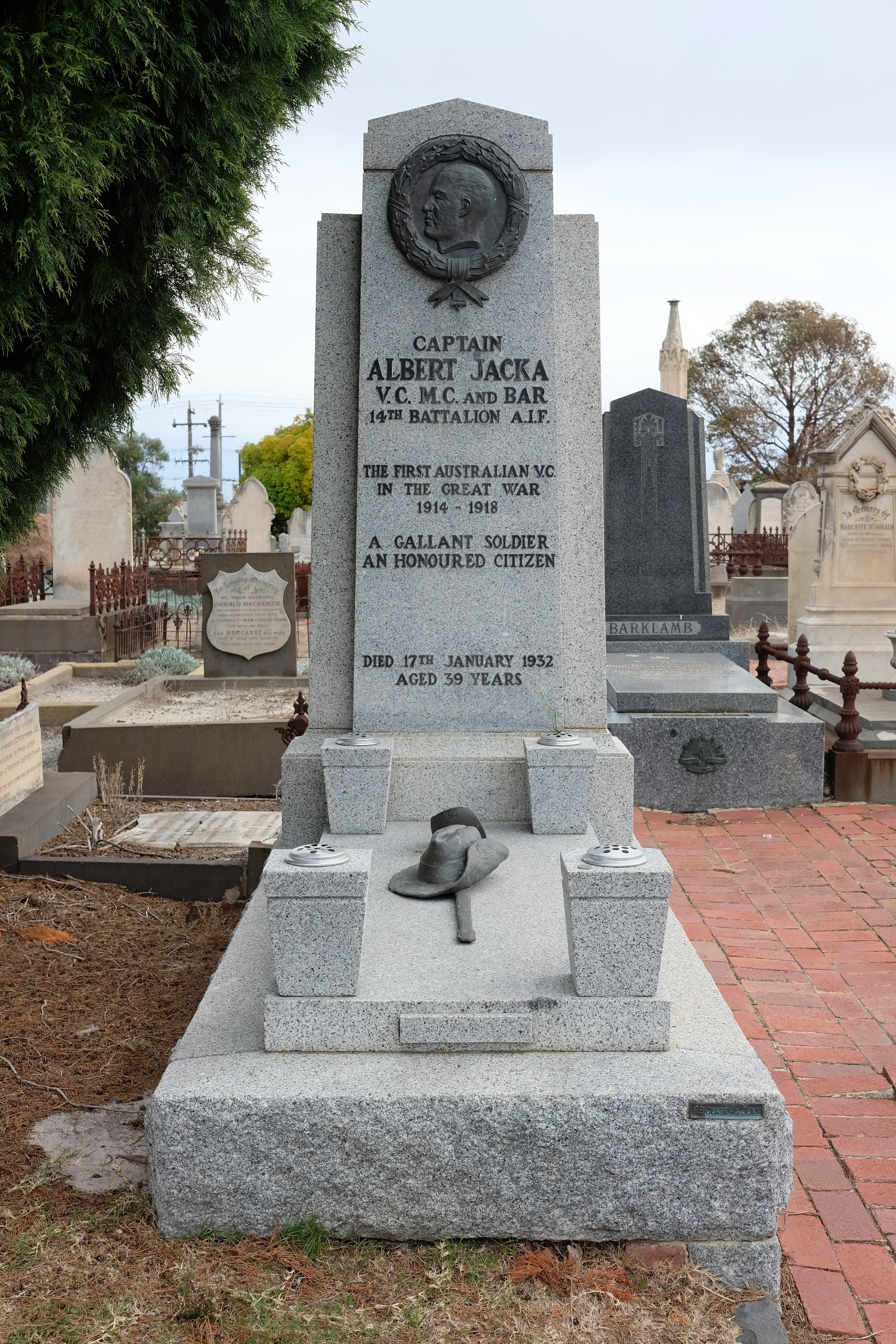
The grave of Albert Jacka in St Kilda cemetery.

- David Andrade, anarchist
- Tilly Aston, founder of the Melbourne Braille Library
- Harold Breen, senior public servant
- Norman Brookes, tennis player
- Archibald Campbell, ornithologist
- Alfred Deakin, Prime Minister
- Michael Gudinski, Promoter
- Mary McKenzie Finlay, WWI matron
- Edmund FitzGibbon, planner, civil servant, pioneer of the Melbourne and Metropolitan Board of Works
- Caroline Hodgson, "Madame Brussels"
- Jessica Jacobs, actress
- Albert Jacka VC, soldier and councillor
- James Lorimer, shipping magnate, politician
- Christina Macpherson, composer
- Ferdinand von Mueller, botanist
- William Pitt, architect
- Premiers of Victoria
  - William Haines
  - Bryan O'Loghlen
  - George Kerferd
  - James Munro
  - George Turner
- Hugh Ramsay, artist
- Robert Rede, Eureka Uprising identity, commissioner, sheriff
- Frederick Sargood, merchant and senator
- John Shillinglaw, historian
- Monckton Synnot, squatter, merchant
- Gyles Turner, historian

== War graves ==
The cemetery contains the war graves of 20 Commonwealth service personnel, including 4 from World War I and 16 from World War II.
