= Grey Street, Melbourne =

Street in Melbourne, Victoria

Coordinates: 37°51′41″S 144°58′44″E

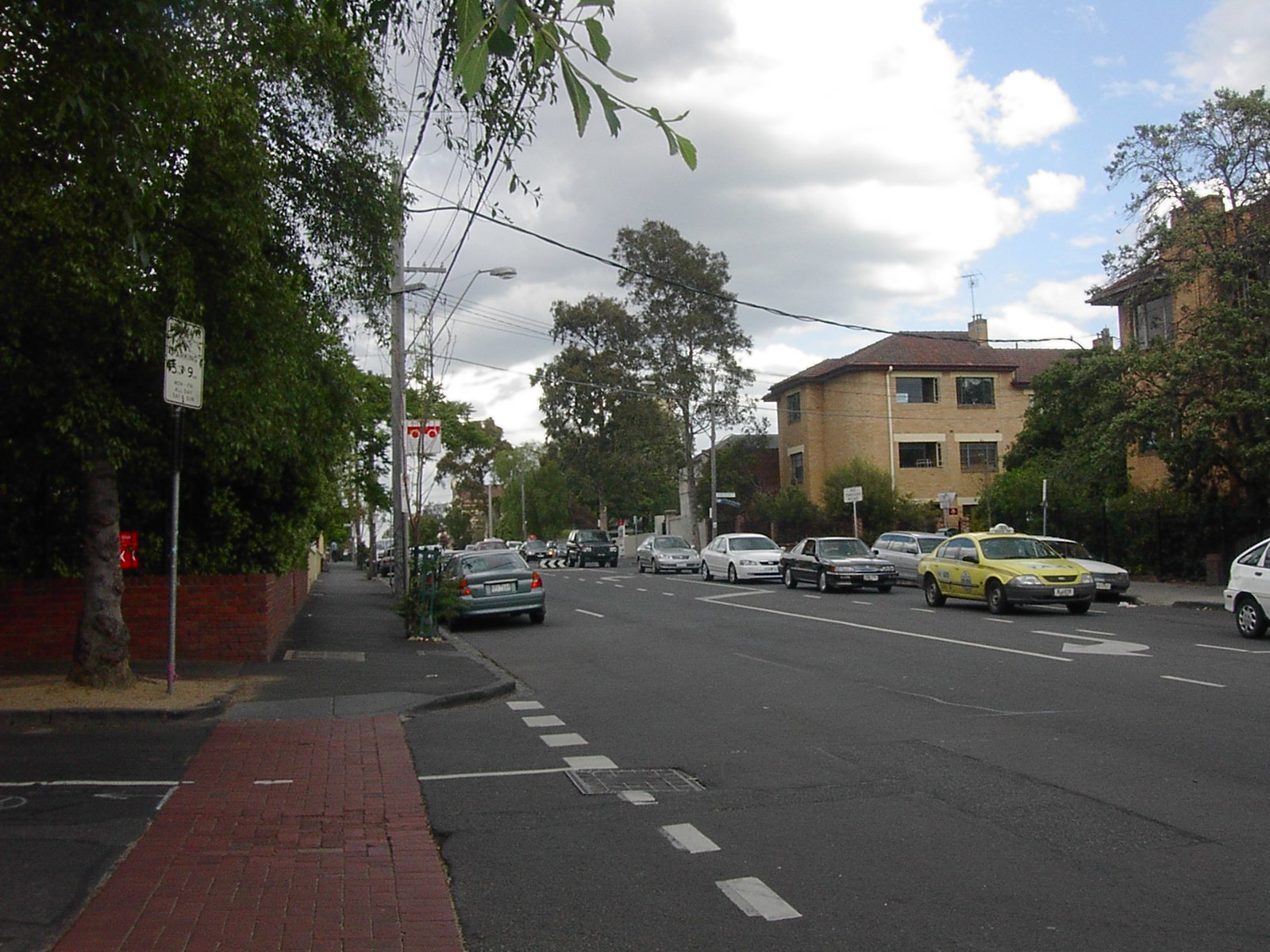
Grey St, St Kilda, looking south-west from the corner of Dalgety St

There are 14 Grey Streets in metropolitan Melbourne, but by far the best-known is Grey Street in St Kilda, once a grand residential street but now with a reputation as a centre of prostitution.

Grey St was almost certainly named after Sir George Grey, who was Governor of South Australia from 1841 to 1845 and later Prime Minister of New Zealand from 1877 to 1879. St Kilda's official historian, John Butler Cooper, suggests that it may have been named for another Sir George Grey, a British politician, but the fact other nearby streets are also named after colonial governors (Fitzroy St after Charles FitzRoy, Governor of New South Wales, Barkly St after Henry Barkly, Governor of Victoria, and Robe St after Frederick Robe, Grey's successor as Governor of South Australia), makes the first Sir George Grey more likely.

Grey Street runs south-east between Fitzroy and Barkly Streets. It lies within the original settlement area of the village of St Kilda, which was subdivided for land sales in 1842. As St Kilda grew into a wealthy and fashionable suburb during the second half of the 19th century, Grey St became lined with the mansions of Melbourne's prosperous mercantile class, attracted by the proximity of St Kilda beach and the hotels and restaurants of Fitzroy St and The Esplanade. One of leading hotels of the era, the George, stands on the corner of Fitzroy and Grey Sts. After decades of decline, it has recently been refurbished and its upper floors converted to apartments.

The best-known of Grey Street's great homes was Eildon Mansion, built in 1877 by the wealthy pastoralist John Lang Currie. After many years as a guesthouse, Eildon was bought in 2006 by the Alliance française of Melbourne and has been restored. (Note: Eildon Mansion was built to face the sea, so the view from Grey Street is actually of the back of the house. The original front of the house is now inaccessible because of later buildings, so the Grey Street side is now used as the front.) Next to Eildon is the house where Prime Minister of Australia Stanley Bruce was born in 1883. Other mansions have been converted into apartments or backpackers' hostels. Another well-known landmark on the street in the 19th century was the St Kilda Coffee Palace, now a backpackers' hostel.

The first town hall at the corner of Grey and Barkly Streets c. 1860.

During the 20th century the social status of St Kilda declined and the wealthy moved away from Grey Street. Since the 1970s it has become notorious as one of Melbourne's main areas of street prostitution. Female prostitutes operate day and night on the corners of Dalgety ("hooker's corner"), Robe and Barkly Streets; and customers in cars, known locally as "gutter crawlers", are regarded by local residents as a major nuisance. Drug use in the area is also regarded as a problem. At night there is a frequent police presence along Grey Street, particularly on weekends.

The most prominent landmark on Grey Street is the Sacred Heart Catholic Church, dedicated to the Sacred Heart of Jesus in 1884 by Archbishop James Goold. The Church operates a large welfare centre, the Sacred Heart Mission, near the corner of Grey and Robe Streets, providing meals and sleeping accommodation to the homeless and needy. The Salvation Army operates the St Kilda Crisis Centre on Grey Street, offering services including a needle exchange facility for drug users.

== Grey Street Gallery ==
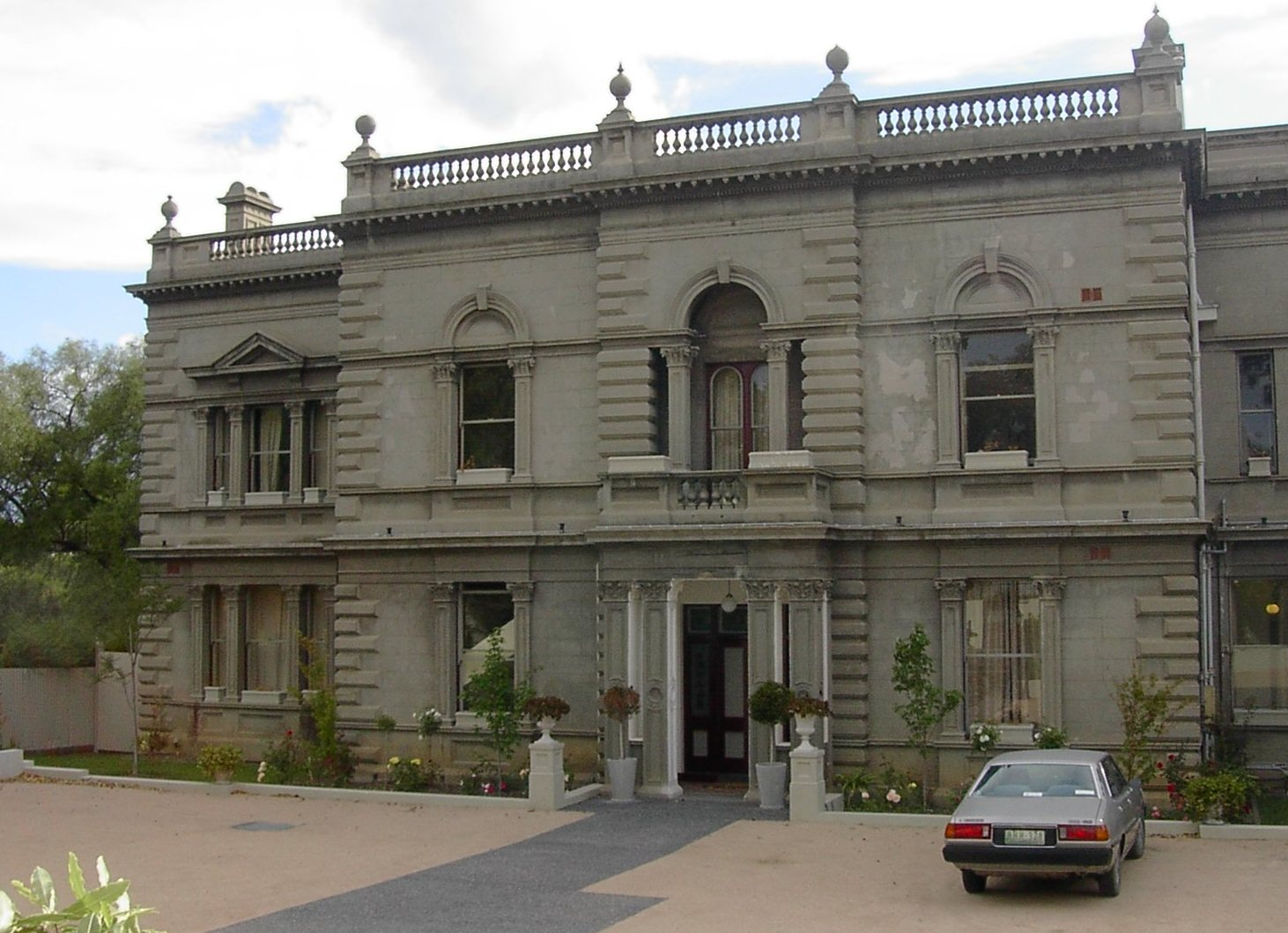
Eildon Mansion from Grey Street (actually the back of the building)

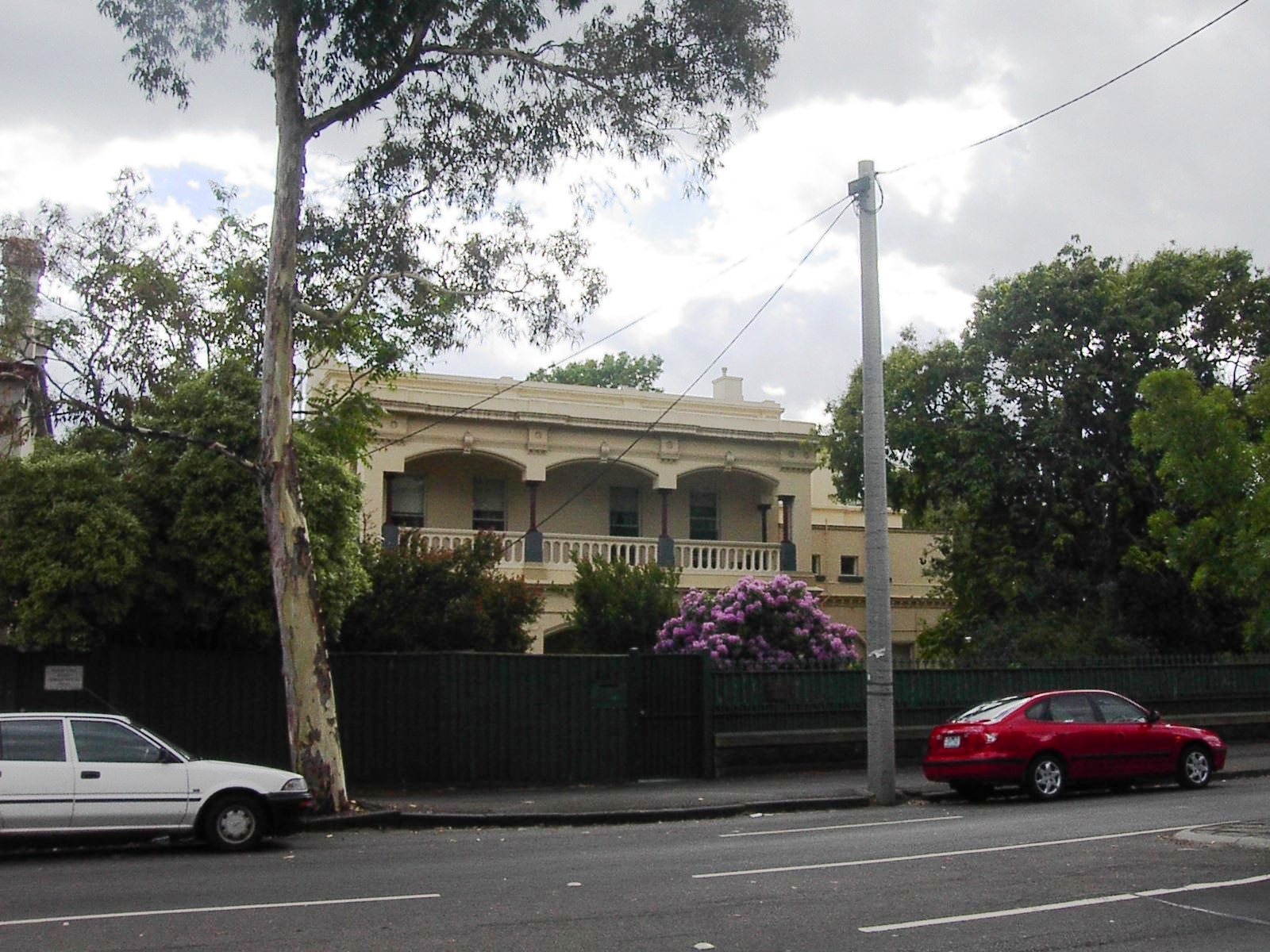
The house where Stanley Bruce was born

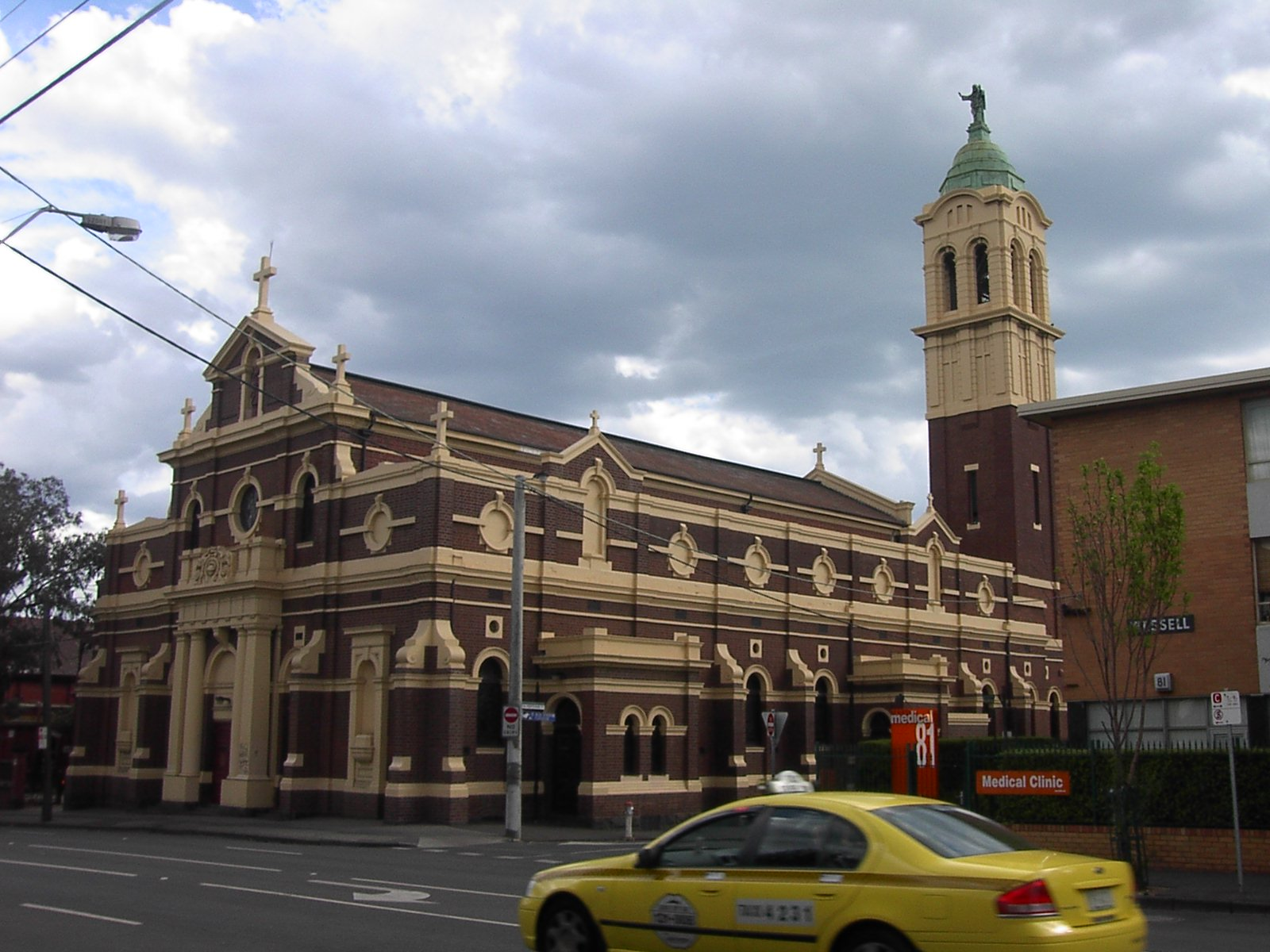
Sacred Heart Church

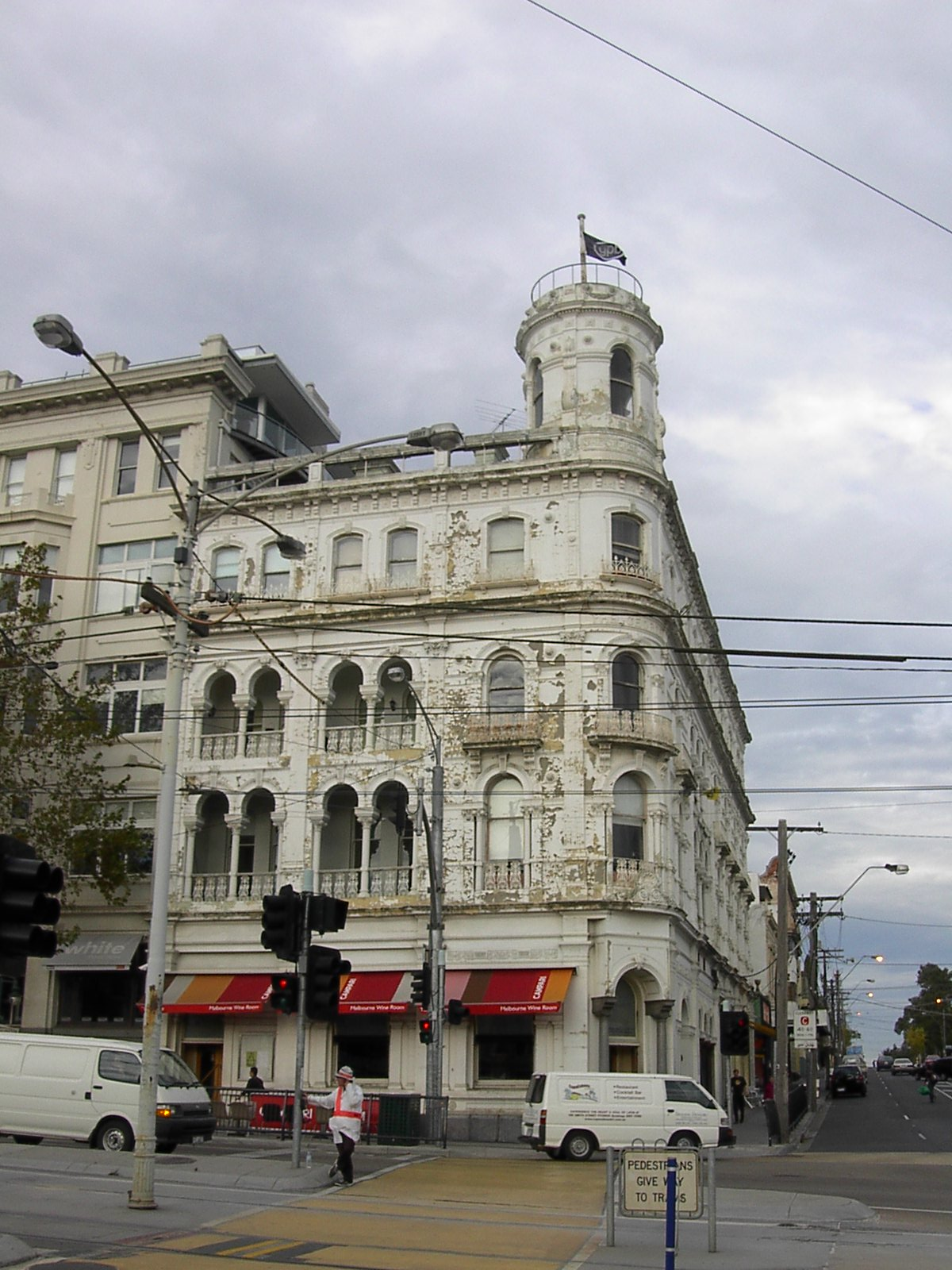
The George Hotel on the corner of Grey and Fitzroy Streets

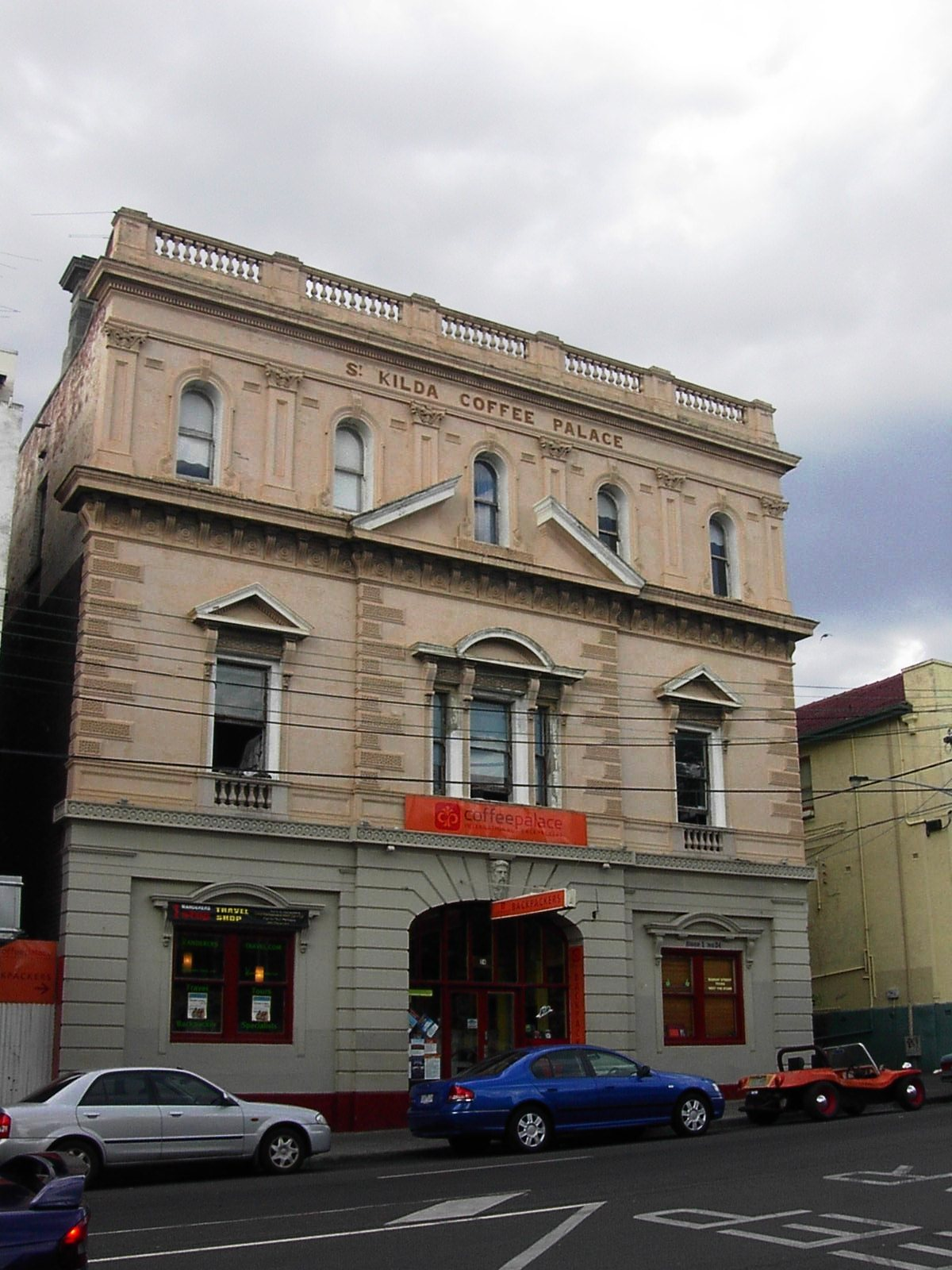
The St Kilda Coffee Palace

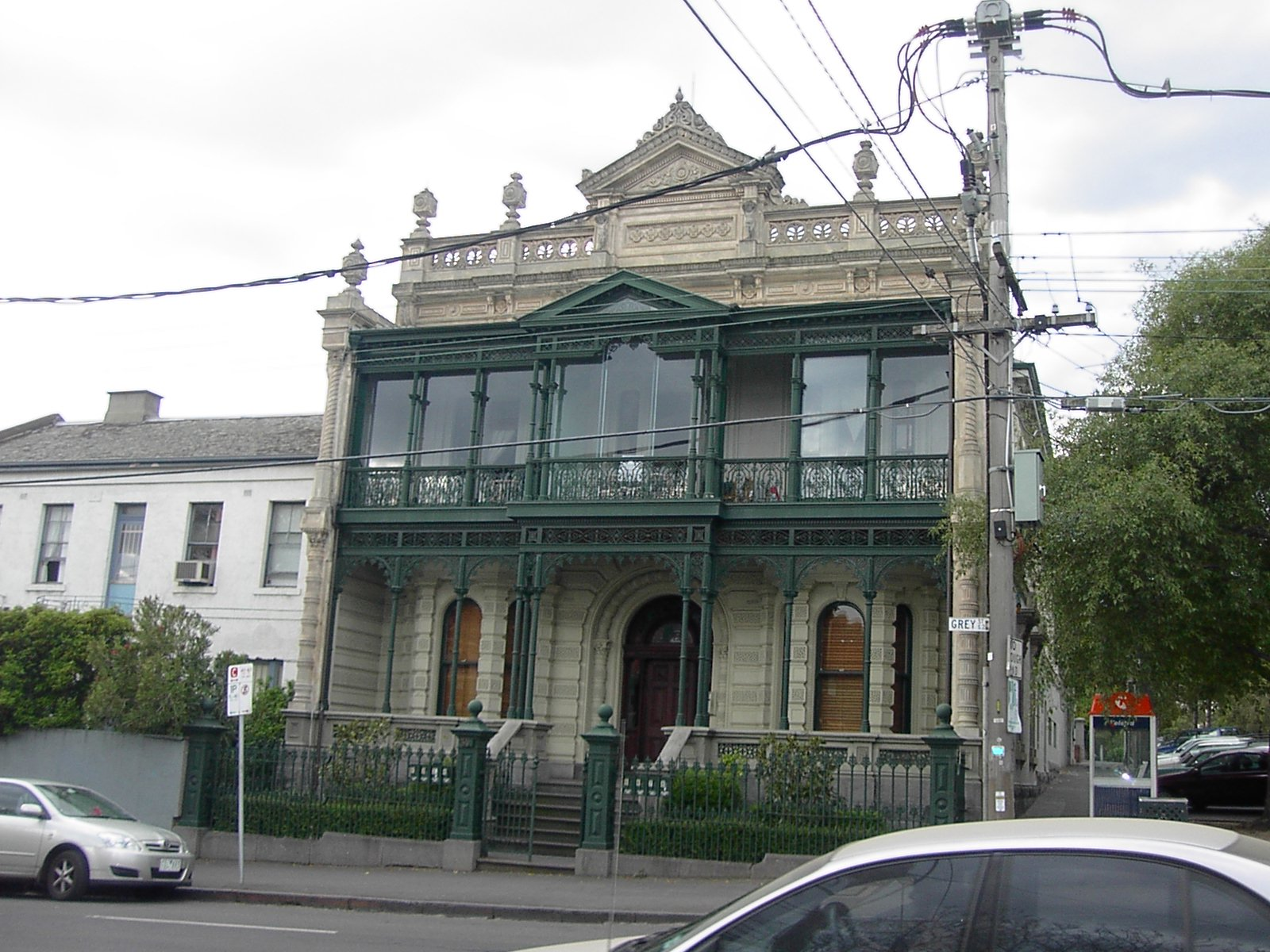
A Grey St mansion cut up into apartments

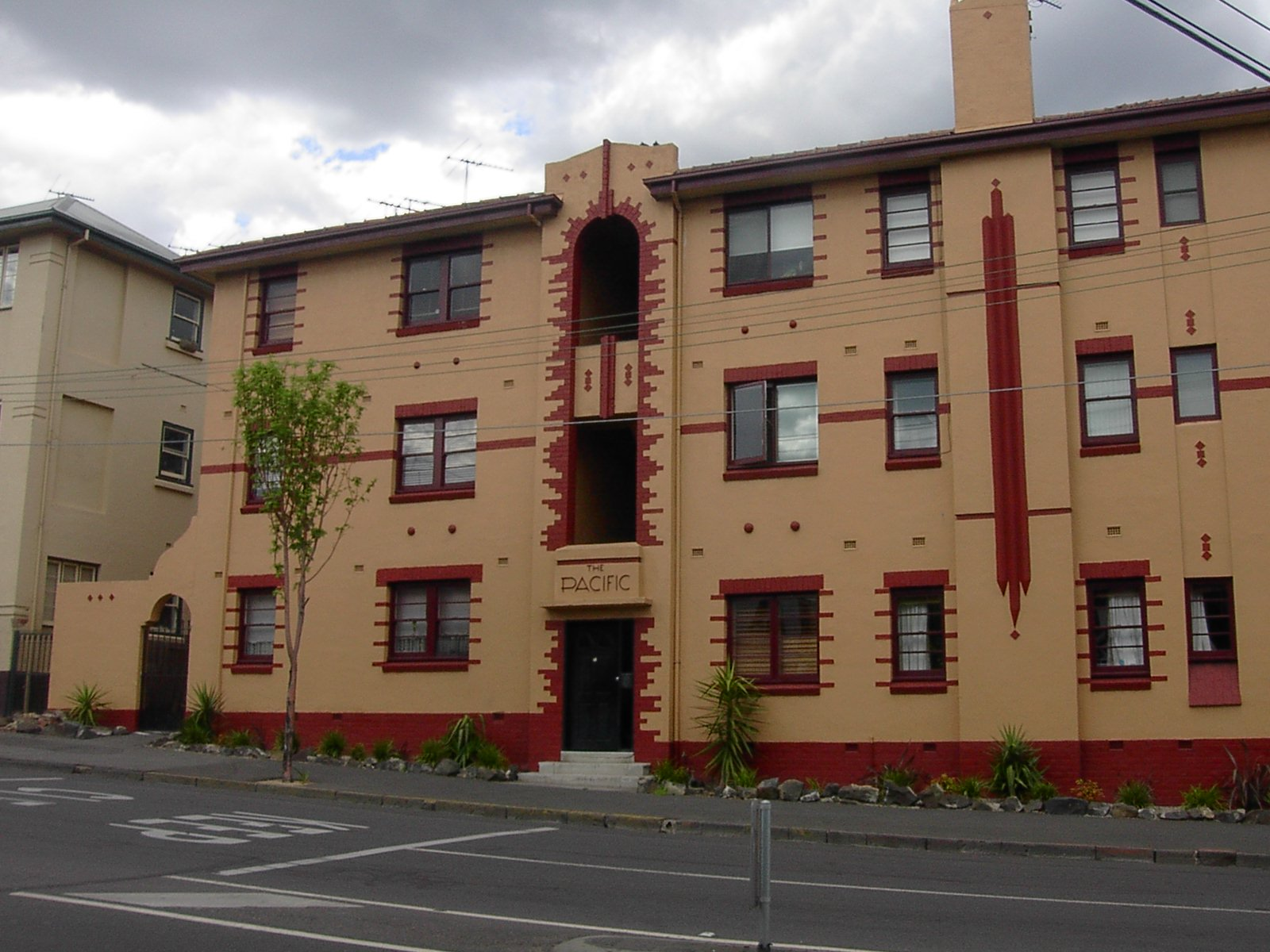
The Pacific, an apartment block dating from the 1920s corner of Grey and Barkly Streets (on the former site of the town hall)

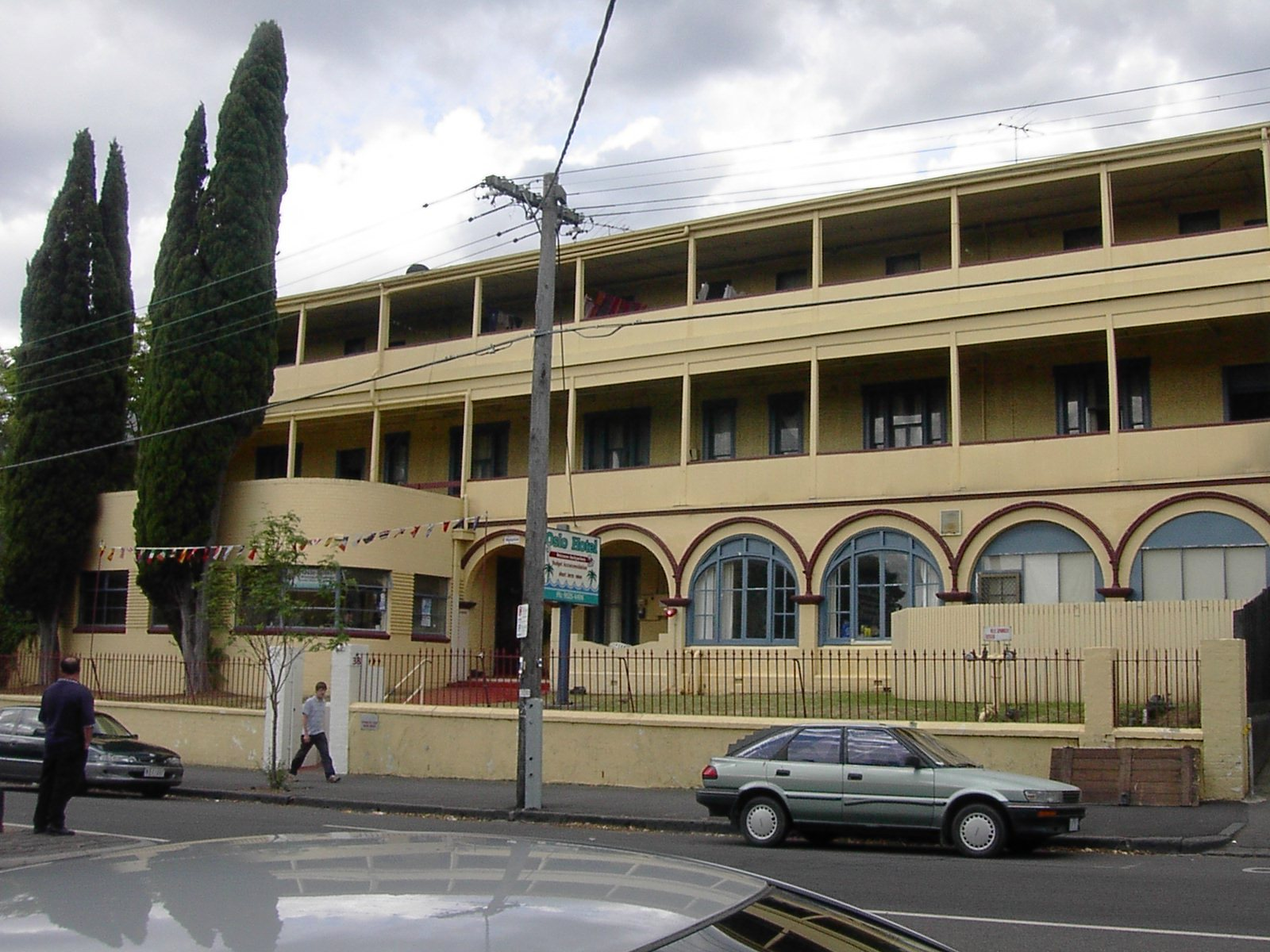
The Oslo backpackers' hostel
