= How to Make Trouble and Influence People =

1996 book

- Author: Iain McIntyre
- Language: English
- Genre: Non-fiction
- Publication date: 1996
- Publication place: Australia
- ISBN: 0958554927

How to Make Trouble and Influence People (ISBN 0958554927) is a self-published book from 1996 chronicling the history of political pranks and acts of creative subversion in Australia. The book consists of a series of short paragraphs describing incidents, as well as facsimiles of flyers, posters and graffiti. It also includes an interview with Greg Wadley, author of the zine Loser.

The incidents detailed in How to Make Trouble date from the early colonial days to recent times, and include both explicitly political and non-political pranks. They include industrial disputes in the 1920s, recent environmental and anti-war protests, as well as acts of inspired vandalism and detournement. As such, this book can be said to be a testament to the larrikin tradition of Australia, and its numerous manifestations throughout history.

Two sequels were released, How to Stop Whining and Start Living and Revenge of the Troublemaker. Each of these is attributed to the "Question Mark Collective". It is believed that one of the compilers was Iain McIntyre.

Iain McIntyre wrote and edited How to Make Trouble and Influence People: Pranks, Hoaxes, Graffiti, and Mischief-Making around Australia the most widely received installment in the series as well as maybe having edited Revenge of the Troublemaker: How to Make Trouble and Influence People Part 3 this has also led to him being the most, or even only, interviewed person related to these books. This puts him in a unique position to articulate the motive and ethos behind the books’ publications. Iain McIntyre is a writer and radio broadcaster from Melbourne, he has been involved in activism from the 1980s and still takes part in actions today. He has written and edited many books and pamphlets about Australia's history and subversive cultures. McIntyre has also played several bands.

Copies of these books may possibly be found in anarchist and countercultural bookshops in Australia.

The book influenced the production of the ABC Radio Background Briefing program on Culture Jamming: How to Make Trouble and Influence People, broadcast in 1998 and also featured in Head Space No 4, the Australian Broadcasting Corporation's monthly Arts and Culture Magazine.

A collected and expanded version of all three of the original publications, How to Make Trouble and Influence People: Pranks, Hoaxes, Graffiti and Mischief-making from Across Australia (ISBN 9780980415117) was collated by Iain McIntyre and Breakdown Press for release in October 2009. The 276-page book includes expanded historical listings, over 300 photographs and 14 interviews with Australian trouble makers.

== See also ==
- Anarchism in Australia
