= Mary McKenzie Finlay =

Australian army nurse and matron

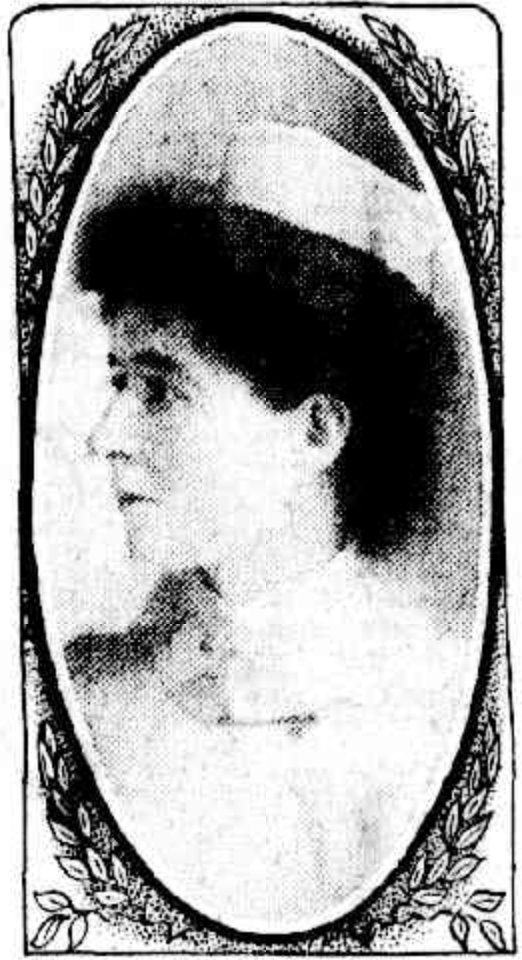
- Finlay in 1914
- Born: 28 January 1870; Kilmore, Victoria, Australia
- Died: 21 March 1923 (aged 53); Warrandyte, Victoria, Australia
- Burial place: St Kilda Cemetery
- Military career
- Allegiance: Australia
- Branch: Australian Army
- Service years: 1904–1919
- Rank: Matron
- Unit: Australian Army Nursing Service
- Conflicts: First World War
- Awards: Royal Red Cross

Mary McKenzie Finlay, RRC (28 January 1870 – 21 March 1923) was an Australian army nurse and matron at Melbourne Grammar School.

== Early life ==
Mary McKenzie Finlay was born at Kilmore, Victoria, on 28 January 1870. She was the eldest of thirteen children born to station master/land valuer James and Elizabeth (née Hill) Finlay. She and her siblings were educated at home by a governess.

== Nursing career ==
Finlay enrolled in nursing at Melbourne Hospital on 16 December 1896 and received her certification on 16 February 1900. She worked at the hospital in surgical ward 22 while completing her training to be a matron. In December 1907 she was appointed matron at Melbourne Grammar School, where she remained until the outbreak of the First World War.

Finlay had joined the Australian Army Nursing Service in 1904. Following the outbreak of the First World War, she was one of the first six nurses sent from Victoria when she embarked on HMAT Shropshire for Egypt on 20 October 1914. On arrival she served briefly in the Egyptian Army Hospital in Cairo before being transferred as assistant matron to No. 1 Australian General Hospital at Heliopolis. In July 1915 she was appointed matron of the Ras-el-Tin convalescent home in Alexandria, with 1500 military patients in her charge. In April 1916, she was transferred to Rouen in France as matron at the No. 1 Australian General Hospital.

In the 1917 New Year Honours, Finlay was awarded the Royal Red Cross "in recognition of valuable service with the Armies in the Field". Finlay was transferred to England in February 1918 as matron of No. 2 Australian Auxiliary Hospital, Southall, which specialised in the care for soldiers who had lost limbs.

Finlay returned from the war in 1919 and was demobilised on 26 July. She returned to her role of matron at Melbourne Grammar School, from which she resigned in 1922 due to ill health. Her war service record states she had an operation in 1915 in Egypt for "injury to breast and tumor" and a further operation back in Australia in April 1919, after which it was reported that she "still had some thickening in neck".

Finlay died of cancer at Warrandyte, Victoria, on 21 March 1923. Following a funeral service in the school chapel she was buried at St Kilda Cemetery.
