= Harry Hooton =

Australian poet and anarchist

- Born: Henry (Harry) Arthur Hooton; 9 October 1908; Doncaster, Yorkshire, England
- Died: 27 June 1961 (aged 52); Sydney, New South Wales, Australia
- Occupation: Poet

Henry (Harry) Arthur Hooton (9 October 1908 – 27 June 1961) was an Australian poet and social commentator whose writing spanned the years 1930s–1961. He was described by a biographer as ahead of his time, or rather "of his time while the majority of progressive artists and thinkers in Australia lagged far behind". Initially a socialist and "wobbly", he later professed anarchism and became an associate of the Sydney Push during the 1940s, with connections to many other Australian writers, film makers and artists. Hooton's constant attitude and literary style was extravagant, provocative and explicitly outrageous.

== Early life ==
Hooton was born in Doncaster, Yorkshire, England. His father was Levi Hooton, a railway shunter, and his mother's maiden name was Margaret Lester-Glaister. He had an older brother, Frank.

At the age of 16 he arrived in Sydney on 28 October 1924, on the ship Demosthenes as part of an Empire scheme, the Dreadnought Trust, with fifty-nine other boys. After humping his swag around much of New South Wales and Queensland through the Great Depression, in 1936, just as his first pieces of writing were being published, Hooton was introduced to the poet Marie E. J. Pitt living in Melbourne and carried on a correspondence with her for the next eight years.

== Literary development ==
Hooton's first book of poetry, "These Poets", appeared in 1941, published at his own expense in a small print run of up to 400 copies, most of which Hooton either gave away or swapped. It struck a chord with readers, receiving much critical acclaim.

In 1943 Hooton met the authors Nettie Palmer and Miles Franklin while they were travelling through Newcastle. Through Miles Franklin he was introduced to the writings of Carl Sandburg and the American literary scene. Moving to Sydney in 1943 Hooton submitted a book of poems titled "Leave Yourself Alone" to a publisher without success. Later he self-published "Things You See When You Haven't Got A Gun". In a new magazine, untitled, unpretentious and called simply "No. 1", the poetry of Hooton, A. D. Hope, and Gary Lyle was featured. Hooton and Hope also featured in "No. 2".

Hooton's "Things You See When You Haven't Got A Gun" was reviewed by Max Harris in one line in the Ern Malley issue of Angry Penguins, "Our anarchist bull careers madly through his intellectual fog."

=== "Sydney Push" milieu ===
In Sydney after World War II, Hooton was drawn to the intellectual circles of Sydney University, the Sydney Push and the wider artistic society of the Lincoln coffee lounge, described by Richard Appleton as the "Mecca of the Australian arts", and the Tudor Hotel. Appleton and others have noted Hooton's opposition to the generally favoured realist philosophy of Professor John Anderson and its activist offshoot, the Libertarian Society.

When Anderson's realist philosophy held intellectual sway at Sydney University, Hooton attacked vehemently philosophy and universities (he claimed sometimes that Anderson was his main enemy, although he defended Anderson when he thought he was being wrongly attacked). To a literary world influenced by people such as Joyce, Yeats, Pound and Eliot, Hooton decried them as anti-artists, philistines and charlatans. He admitted only a few people as poets, including Whitman, Wilde and Henry Lawson.

Appleton explained: "Hooton held that polemic was an art form and that all poetry should be didactic", an obtuse view which, coupled with his paradoxical debating style, brought Hooton into conflict with Libertarians (who especially revered Joyce's Ulysses) and with more puristic poets such as Lex Banning, James McAuley and A. D. Hope. Yet his presence was compelling and characteristically welcomed by those who would otherwise be in disagreement. Many years later, Germaine Greer noted his influence on her:

...Harry, the utopian anarchist who had admired her red stockings, who believed people were perfect and who was not weighed down by the tremendous forces the anarchistic pessimists felt bore down on them all the time. "Alas, I understand him much better now," she said, twenty years later. "... but I think a lot of the things I've done since I've done out of a desire to please Harry Hooton..."

While Hooton was living a very bohemian life in Sydney, he was connecting with literary people in Japan, India, Greece, South Africa, England, France, New Zealand, and the USA. Hooton had corresponded with counter-culture figures in California, and with Tuli Kupferberg who would later form the rock group The Fugs. He contributed to many periodicals and journals in addition to those he brought out himself. "He has published not only in Australia but in London, San Francisco, Chicago, New York, etc, and has had some material translated into Greek. He is far better known overseas than he is here".

=== Anarcho-technocracy ===
Hooton argued that man should have power over things, including machines, but never over other men, applying to himself the term "anarcho-technocrat". "He regarded the age of man as passed, and sees the age of the machine as the proper object of pursuit... In his quest for power over machines, Hooton is a technocrat, and in his opposition to power over men, he is an anarchist."

Hooton never completed his philosophical treatise, titled "Militant Materialism", although he did complete six of its eight chapters. His ideas were magically simple. Leave man alone, man is perfect. Concentrate instead on matter. He formulated what he called Anarcho-technocracy: 'The Politics of Things'.

Hooton saw proof copies of the last book published during his lifetime, It Is Great To Be Alive, published by Margaret Elliott (Margaret Fink), just before he died of cancer in 1961.

An 83-minute experimental film, Harry Hooton – Outsider Poet was made by Arthur and Corinne Cantrill in 1969. In the soundtrack, Hooton outlines his social philosophy in a series of recordings made shortly before his death in 1961.

== See also ==
- Anarchism in Australia

== Bibliography ==
- Pogonoski, R. G. "These Poets" (poetry collection) Newcastle 1941
- Cooney, W. A. "Things You See When You Haven't Got a Gun" (poetry collection) 1943
- "It is Great To Be Alive" (poetry collection) published by Margaret Elliott for 21st Century Art Group, Sydney 1961
- "Anarcho-Technocracy: The Politics of Things" (four-page pamphlet) 1953
- "The Politics of Things" Essay published in 21st Century: The Magazine of a Creative Civilization, September 1955
- "Power Over Things" (collection), Inferno Press, USA, 1955
- "Poet of the 21st Century: Harry Hooton—Collected Poems". Edited by Sasha Soldatow. Collins/Angus & Robertson, Sydney 1990 ISBN 0-207-16646-3
