= John Arthur Andrews =

Australian anarchist writer

- Born: 27 October 1865; Bendigo, Victoria, Australia
- Died: 26 July 1903 (aged 37); Melbourne, Victoria, Australia

John Arthur "Jack" or "J.A." Andrews (27 October 1865 – 26 July 1903), was an Australian anarchist theoretician, agitator and journalist. He was also a poet and inventor and author of fiction.

== Biography ==
John Arthur Andrews was born in Bendigo, Victoria to John Andrews, a clerk, and his wife Eliza Mary Ann, whose maiden name was Barnett. He matriculated from Scotch College, Melbourne in 1881.

Dismissed in 1886 from his clerical employment with the Victorian public service for "insubordination", he had already had occasional pieces published, including in the Melbourne Herald where he won the poetry prize in 1885 for a poem about the Eight Hour Day. After dismissal he earned his living from his writing and was published in mainstream journals such as Melbourne Punch and The Bulletin and elsewhere.

It is unclear when he joined the Melbourne Anarchist Club but was appearing at its meetings by early 1887, and rapidly became a significant member. In the Melbourne Anarchist Club he represented the communist anarchism pole, strongly influenced by Kropotkin, and edited the club's journal Honesty. He took an active part in the struggles of the day, notably the 1890 Australian maritime dispute and was involved with the Sydney direct action group, the Active Service Brigade. He was imprisoned for three months in NSW in 1894 for the publication of A Handbook of Anarchy (the actual charge being a technicality), and further imprisoned for five months (plus two months on remand) for sedition in December 1894. Skilled in languages he corresponded continually with the European anarchist movement. His friend the poet and socialist Bernard O'Dowd claimed that he was fluent in all the European languages except Russian, and also fluent in Latin and Chinese.

He was known for his asceticism, his eccentricity, and his good humour, and was respected in the labour movement. Bernard O'Dowd supported his appointment as editor of the labour journal Tocsin in 1902, a position he held for a few months before his health collapsed and he was hospitalized for tuberculosis. He died in hospital on 26 July 1903.

== See also ==
- Anarchism in Australia

== Selected works ==
- Temple Mystic and Other Poems, 1888
- A handbook of anarchy, 1894
- The Anarchist: organ of Anarchist Communism, 1897
- What Is Communism? edited by Bob James, 1984
