= David Andrade (anarchist) =

Australian anarchist (1859–1928)

David Alfred Andrade
- Born: 30 April 1859; Collingwood, Colony of Victoria
- Died: 23 May 1928 (aged 69); Wendouree, Australia
- Writing career
- Subject: Political philosophy

David Alfred Andrade (30 April 1859 – 23 May 1928) was an Australian individualist anarchist.

== Biography ==
His parents were Abraham Da Costa Andrade and Maria Giles, both from Middlesex, England. His brother William Charles Andrade was also an anarchist . They were active in Joseph Symes's Australasian Secular Association.

On 14 May 1886, David Andrade, his brother Will and half a dozen others formed the Melbourne Anarchist Club, the first anarchist organisation in Australia. Andrade became the club secretary and one of its main propagandists.

The Melbourne Anarchist Club produced the journal Honesty, an Australian organ of anarchism which had substantially the same principles as those championed by Benjamin Tucker's Liberty. In a news agency at Brunswick, now an inner suburb of Melbourne, and later in Liberty Hall, Russell St. Melbourne the brothers operated the first anarchist book shops in Australia. Andrade was a vegetarian and with his brother operated the first vegetarian restaurant in Melbourne.

Andrade's main works include Money: A Study of the Currency Question (1887), Our Social System (n.d.), An Anarchist Plan of Campaign (1888), and The Melbourne Riots and how Harry Holdfast and his Friends Emancipated the Workers (1892).

In the early 1890s, Andrade was the secretary of the Unemployed Workers Association.

He became a settler with his family at Fern Tree Gully. However, bush fires destroyed everything around 1898. He was admitted to the Yarra Bend Asylum, with his wife and four children left without support. On 1 December 1903, he was admitted to the Ballarat Hospital for the Insane. According to hospital records, at the time he was "in good bodily health and suffered from delusional insanity." He became gradually weaker from old age in his final years, and died at the hospital on 23 May 1928. The cause of death was found to be senility and heart failure. He was buried on 25 May at St Kilda Cemetery.

== See also ==
- Anarchism in Australia

== Selected publications ==
- Works by or about David Andrew Andrade at Wikisource
- Essay on Truth (1880)
- Money: A Study of the Currency Question (1887)
- What is Anarchy? (1887)
- An Anarchist Plan of Campaign (1888)
- Our Social System (1890)
- The Melbourne Riots and How Harry Holdfast and his Friends Emancipated the Workers (1892)
