= Willem Siebenhaar =

Social activist and writer

- Born: 28 July 1863; The Hague, Netherlands
- Died: 29 December 1936 (aged 73); Littlehampton, England
- Occupations: Writer, translator, social activist

Willem Siebenhaar (Dutch pronunciation: [ˈʋɪləm ˈsibə(n)ɦaːr]; 28 July 1863 – 29 December 1936) was a social activist and writer in Western Australia from the 1890s until he left Australia in 1924. His literary contributions and opposition to policies such as conscription were his most notable contributions to the history of the state.

== Biography ==
Siebenhaar was born in The Hague on 28 July 1863, beginning a lifelong interest in chess at the age of fifteen. His early life saw him exposed to the Christian anarchist, Ferdinand Domela Nieuwenhuis. In 1882 he graduated from Delft University, the Netherlands, and two years later, he emigrated to England to become a teacher.

He sailed to Western Australia in 1891, taking up a position on the staff of Perth High School (now Hale School). The following year he defeated the South Australian chess player Ernest Hack, becoming unofficial Western Australian Chess Champion, and taking over Hack's chess column in The Western Mail. In 1895 he joined the public service, initially as sub-editor of the Western Australian Yearbook. Later he would rise to become Government Statistician and Registrar-General.

In 1895, Siebenhaar began a translation of the first edition of Ongeluckige voyagie van't schip Batavia ("Unlucky voyage of the ship Batavia"), a third person transposition of Francisco Pelsaert's journal of the 1629 shipwreck of Batavia off the west coast of Australia, and subsequent mutiny and massacre amongst the survivors. Printed in the Western Mail in 1897 under the title "The Abrolhos Tragedy", this remains the only English translation of Ongeluckige voyagie. According to Henrietta Drake-Brockman, it "excited an interest that eventually spread across Australia and has never completely faded."

In 1910, Siebenhaar founded the literary magazine Leeuwin, which was co-edited by Alfred Chandler (Spinifex) and A. G. Plate. It ran for only six issues, but featured four contributions by A. G. Stephens on 'The Manly Poetry of Western Australia'. The same year saw the London publication of his Dorothea: A Lyrical Romance in Verse, which would later be scrutinised for sedition.

One day at my friend's house, a chance remark,
Half tentative, brought this in answer, whence
On much conjecture did my thoughts embark:
"It seems that Dorothea, in some sense
Regarding this, is also in the dark,
And, duly contrite at her grave offence
In having passed you without recognition,
She hopes to make amends for her omission.

— Siebenhaar, Dorothea : a Lyrical Romance in Verse. p. 23 (1910)

Shortly afterwards, apparently suffering from poor health, he visited Britain. During this time he married Lydia Bruce Dixon, and may have had contact with the Russian Peter Kropotkin. His health having improved, he returned to Western Australia, apparently in late 1913.

He became heavily involved in a number of social movements, including the advancement of women's suffrage, and the anti-conscription movement. Siebenhaar's participating in the latter movement saw him removed from his position in the public service in 1916, with the press release condemning him as a "German" in league with the notorious Industrial Workers of the World (IWW). Siebenhaar freely admitted campaigning for the release of Monty Miller, who had toured for the IWW. Later, an inquiry into his politics and character exonerated him of disloyalty and reinstated his position with restitution.

In 1919, Siebenhaar published his Sentinel Sonnets (with Alfred Chandler), a eulogy for the anarchist Monty Miller. Other contributions to the literature of the state include his work in collecting and editing material for James Sykes Battye's Western Australia: a history from its discovery to the inauguration of the Commonwealth. His various contributions to newspapers and magazines also reflected the views promulgated by the esoteric society, the Theosophical Society, of which he was a member. He continued to write and critique poetry, entering into debates with early poets such as Edwin Murphy, whose style contrasted his own romantic approach.

Siebenhaar returned to England in 1924, living in Findon in Sussex. There, in 1927, he translated Eduard Douwes Dekker's Max Havelaar. The preface was supplied by his friend D. H. Lawrence, whose left-wing activist Willie Struthers in the novel Kangaroo was likely based on Siebenhaar. He was struck by a motor car and died from injuries on 29 December 1936 at Littlehampton, West Sussex.

== See also ==
- Anarchism in Australia
