= Robinson baronets of Batts House (1823) =

Extinct baronetcy in the Baronetage of the United Kingdom

Robinson baronets
- Creation date: 1823
- Status: extinct
- Extinction date: 1944
- Motto: Spes mea in futuro est, My hope is in the future

The Robinson Baronetcy, of Batts House in the County of Somerset, was created in the Baronetage of the United Kingdom on 11 November 1823 for George Robinson, who had earlier represented Honiton in Parliament. The title became extinct on the death of the sixth Baronet in 1944.

== Robinson baronets, of Batts House (1823) ==
- Sir George Abercrombie Robinson, 1st Baronet (1758–1832)
- Sir George Best Robinson, 2nd Baronet (1797–1855)
- Sir George Abercrombie Robinson, 3rd Baronet (1826–1891)
- Sir William Le Fleming Robinson, 4th Baronet (1830–1895)
- Sir Ernest William Robinson, 5th Baronet (1862–1924)
- Sir Douglas Innes Robinson, 6th Baronet (1863–1944). He died without heir.

== Extended family ==
John Innes Robinson (1834–1891), father of the writer Alice Perrin and the 5th and 6th baronets, was an Indian Army officer. He was a grandson of the 1st baronet.

== See also ==
- Robinson baronets

== Notes ==
Baronetage of the United Kingdom
Preceded by Reid baronets	Robinson baronets of Batts House; 11 November 1823	Succeeded by Baillie baronets
