= Texas Jack Omohundro =

American frontier scout and showman (1846–1880)

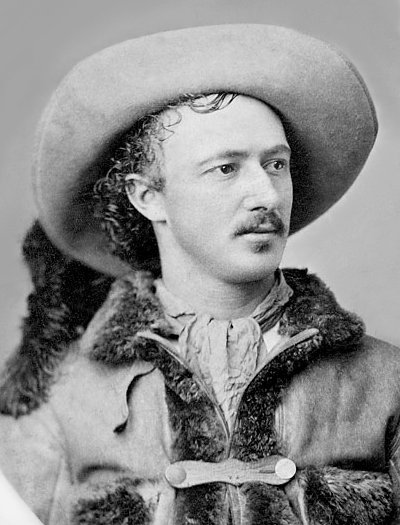
- Omohundro in 1872
- Born: John Baker Omohundro; July 27, 1846; Palmyra, Virginia, US
- Died: June 28, 1880 (aged 33); Leadville, Colorado, US
- Occupations: Scout; cowboy; hunter; actor
- Spouse: Giuseppina Morlacchi (m. 1873)

John Baker Omohundro (July 27, 1846 – June 28, 1880), also known as "Texas Jack", was an American frontier scout, actor, and cowboy. Born in rural Virginia, he served the Confederate States of America during the American Civil War. He later served as a civilian scout for the US Army during the American Indian Wars. Before his untimely death, Texas Jack became a legendary figure in the American Old West as a Western showman performing dramas on the stage alongside Buffalo Bill Cody and Wild Bill Hickok, and was immortalized in dime novels published around the world.

== Early life ==
Omohundro was born in Palmyra on the Pleasure Hill farm in Fluvanna County, Virginia, on July 27, 1846, to John Burwell and Catherine Baker Omohundro, of Anglo-American ancestry. He attended grammar school in Fluvanna and at an early age showed a strong skill in hunting and fishing.

At the start of the American Civil War, Omohundro attempted to join his older brother, Orville, in the Confederate Army. He was twice refused for his age, but was allowed to serve as a courier at the headquarters of the Virginia Militia under Major General John B. Floyd. Because of his youth and knowledge of the countryside, he became known as the "Boy Scout of the Confederacy". In February 1864, at the age of 17, he successfully enlisted as a private in Company G of the 5th Virginia Cavalry, part of the Army of Northern Virginia, and was soon serving directly in general J. E. B. Stuart's command as a courier and scout. At the Battle of Yellow Tavern, he delivered a scouting report to Stuart only minutes before the general was killed in battle. During the Battle of Trevilian Station, Omohundro was wounded and admitted to the Confederate States General Hospital in Charlottesville on June 20, 1864. After recovering from his injuries, and a short leave home, he returned to his company and scouted under the command of General Lunsford L. Lomax. Following the Third Battle of Winchester, the 5th Virginia Cavalry was consolidated with the 15th Virginia Cavalry, where Omohundro scouted under General Fitzhugh Lee during the last months of the war.

== Cowboy, hunting, and scouting career ==
After the Civil War, Omohundro left Virginia at age 19 for Florida. After a short time, he moved on to Texas, arriving at the Taylor Ranch near Brazos, where he began working as a cowboy participating in cattle drives, notably on the Chisholm Trail. After one drive across Arkansas to a meat-poor Tennessee, he was given nickname "Texas Jack" by the locals. On another drive, Omohundro found a five-year-old boy orphaned after a Native American raid killed his family. He took the boy to safety in Fort Worth, and the boy later took the name Texas Jack Jr. in homage, going on to run the Texas Jack's Wild West Show and Circus in 1903 in South Africa.

In 1869, Texas Jack moved to Fort Hays, Kansas, where he met California Joe Milner and Wild Bill Hickok, the latter being sheriff of Ellis County at the time. Later that year, Jack met and befriended William F. "Buffalo Bill" Cody, who was working with the 5th US Cavalry at Fort McPherson, and Jack was hired as a scout and trail guide during the Indian Wars. Special permission had to be obtained as the US government did not generally permit the employment of ex-Confederate soldiers. During the Battle of Summit Springs, Texas Jack captured his well-known white horse from Indian Chief Tall Bull. Texas Jack moved to Cottonwood Springs, Nebraska, where, aside from his work as a scout for the government, he made a lucrative living leading hunting expeditions for American and foreign parties, which were popular at the time. Notably, Texas Jack, together with Cody, led the highly publicized royal hunt of 1872 with Grand Duke Alexei of Russia and several American military figures, including General Philip Sheridan, General George Armstrong Custer, and Colonel James W. Forsyth. Later in 1874, Texas Jack guided the Earl of Dunraven though Yellowstone and Geyserland. In 1876, Texas Jack led Sir John Rae Reid and his party on a hunt around the Bighorn Mountains and Sweetwater country.

== Acting ==
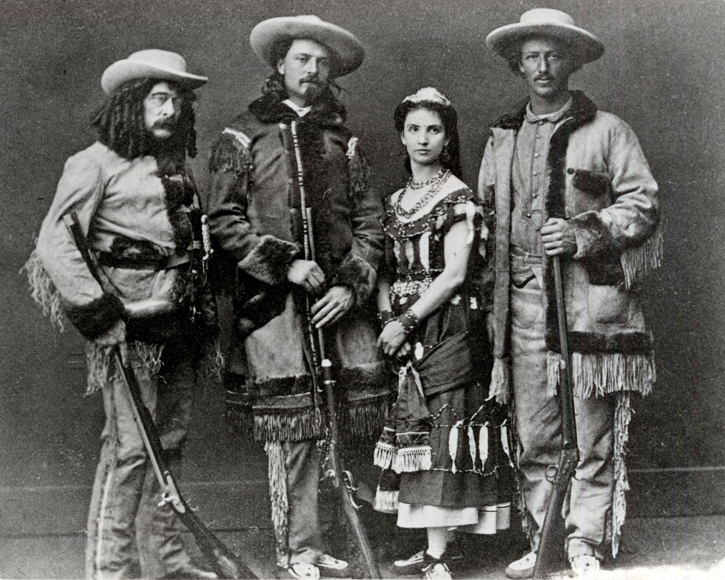
Ned Buntline, Buffalo Bill Cody, Giuseppina Morlacchi, Texas Jack Omohundro

In December 1872, Omohundro and Cody debuted the first Wild West show, Scouts of the Prairie, in Chicago written and produced by Ned Buntline. Texas Jack's performance was well received by critics and featured the first rope act performed on the American stage. The show starred Giuseppina Morlacchi, a dancer and actress from Milan, Italy, who was performing in the theater circuit with her Morlacchi Ballet Troupe when she was invited to join Scouts of the Prairie with the group. She and Texas Jack fell in love and were married on August 31, 1873, at St. Mary's Catholic Church in Rochester, New York.

In 1873, Buntline left, and Wild Bill Hickok joined the group to headline in a new play called Scouts of the Plains. Hickok did not enjoy acting, often hiding behind scenery, and in one show, he shot the spotlight when it focused on him. He was released from the group after a few months.

Desiring a lighter tour schedule, Texas Jack parted ways with Cody, and in 1877, he formed his own acting troupe in St. Louis, known as the Texas Jack Combination featuring Morlacchi, Arizona John Burke, Modoc War scout Donald McKay, trick-shot Maud Oswald, and several Sweetwater and Warm Spring Indians. In May of that year, he debuted Texas Jack in the Black Hills, written by Harry Seymour, to rave reviews. Other plays the combination performed included The Trappers Daughter, Life on the Border, and The French Spy.

== Dime novels ==
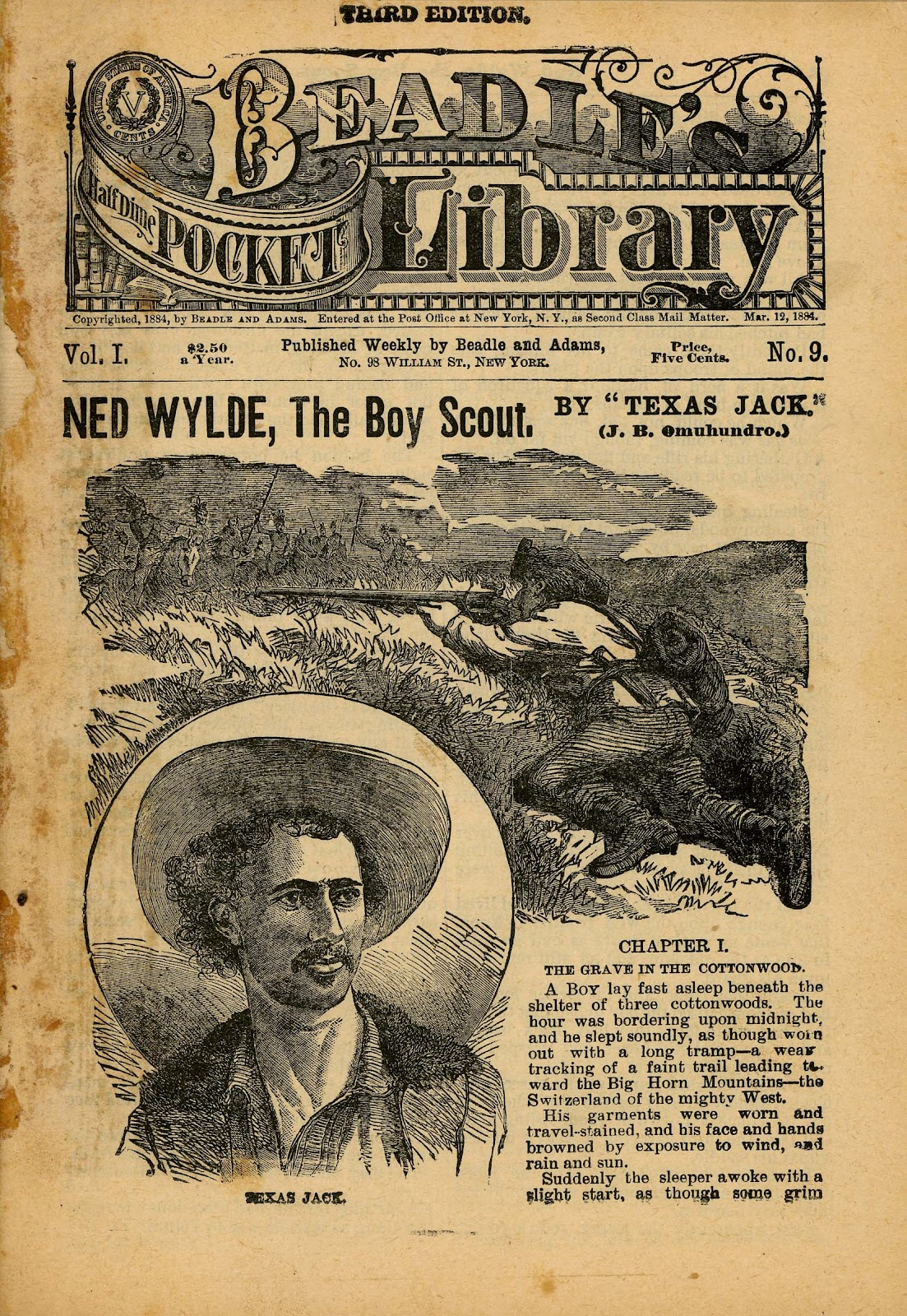
Beadles Dime Novel

In the late 19th century, dime novels depicting frontier life were becoming common, and Texas Jack became a popular subject of these stories. The dime novels, printed on inexpensive wood pulp paper and costing five to ten cents each, were published weekly or monthly. One of the first of these novels was titled Texas Jack; or The White King of the Pawnees, written by Ned Buntline, and first appeared in 1872. Texas Jack's popularity grew as he was featured on covers by publishers including Beadle's New York Dime Library, the Nickle Library, Log Cabin Library, DeWitt's Ten Cent, Street and Smith, and others. Many of these stories were written by the prolific author Prentiss Ingraham. Omohundro wrote articles in newspapers across the country recalling his hunting and scouting stories, and is credited as having authored one dime novel titled Ned Wylde, the Boy Scout for Beadle and Adams in 1876.

In 1900, Joel Chandler Harris wrote On the Wing of Occasions, a series for the Saturday Evening Post, that featured Texas Jack and the Confederate Secret Service in a fictional plot to kidnap President Lincoln. At the time, the stories caused some outrage since it associated Texas Jack with John Wilkes Booth, and after publication, Harris received several letters objecting to Texas Jack's portrayal and attempts to clear his name.

In 1906, Verlagshaus für Volkslitteratur und Kunst, Berlin, published a series of dime novels in German, titled "Texas Jack, Der Grosse Kundschafter" (Texas Jack, the Great Scout). Inspired by Omohundro, the stories are of the fictional Jack Hawkins, an orphan who becomes a scout and cowboy in the American West engaging in skirmishes with Indians and opium smugglers, while some stories are set during the Mormon War and in Maximilian's Mexico. In Germany, the novels were republished in three subsequent series, and they were translated into eight languages - French "Texas Jack, la Terreur Des Indiens" (Texas Jack, the Terror of the Indians), Swedish "Texas Jack, Amerikas mest berömde indianbekämpare" (Texas Jack, America's Famous Indian Fighter), Finnish, Danish, Polish, Dutch, Portuguese, and Italian.

In 1966, Lion, a weekly comic magazine by Fleetway, published a series about Omohundro titled "Texas Jack", which was released in the United Kingdom and Australia after earlier success they had with other Western-themed comic magazines such as "Cowboy Comics", "Buffalo Bill", and "Kit Carson". Unlike earlier dime novels, they were formatted like comics, and the stories were illustrated using panels. In 1972, the Lion comics were translated into Spanish and reissued with new cover art by the Rollán publishing house of Madrid for distribution in Spain.

== Death and legacy ==
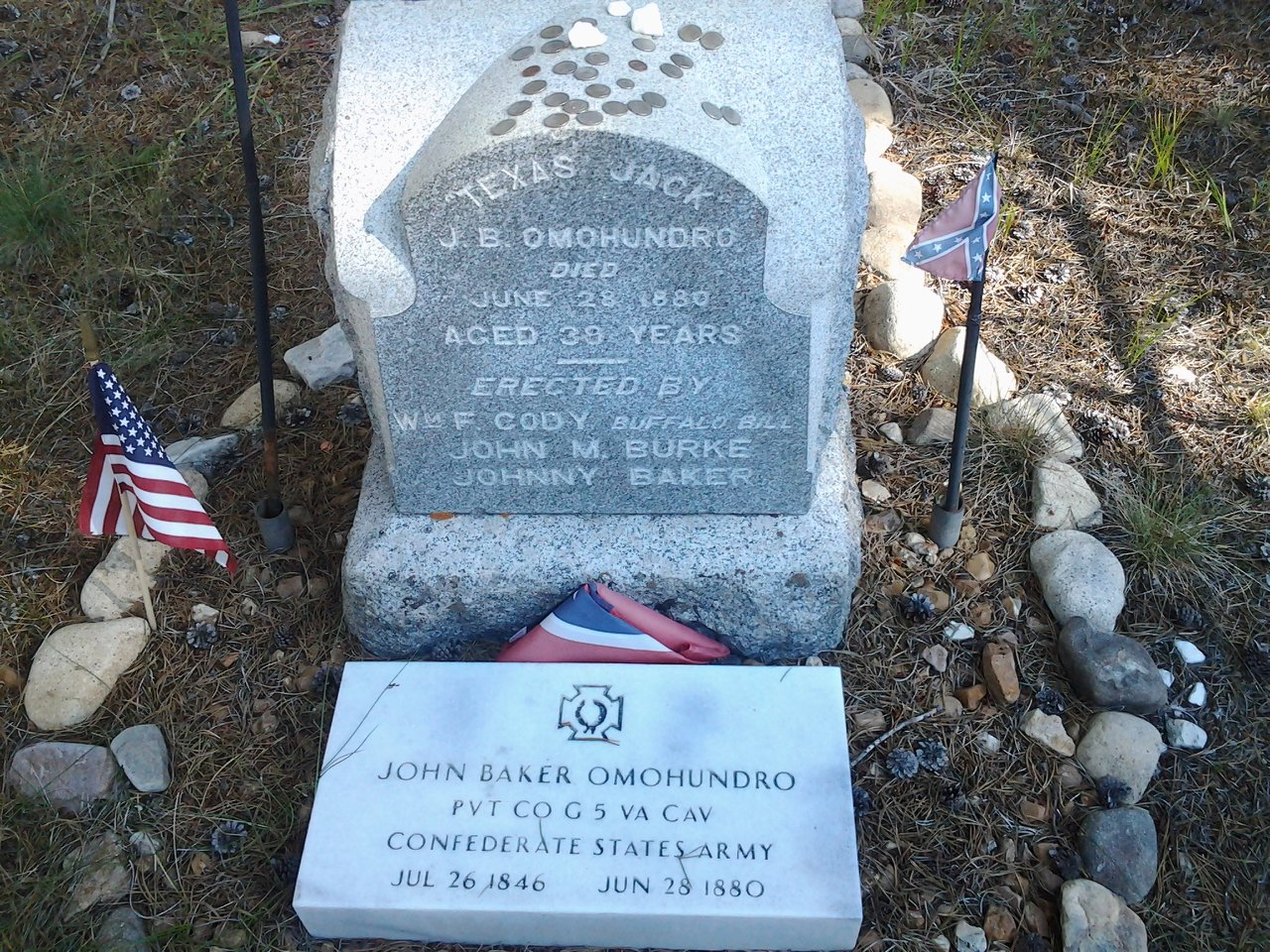
The grave of Texas Jack in Evergreen Cemetery

Texas Jack and Morlacchi settled in Massachusetts with a home in downtown Lowell and a small farm in Billerica. In the spring of 1880, after several performances in the region, the couple decided to sojourn in the silver-mining town of Leadville, Colorado. There, Omohundro became acquainted with Horace Tabor and briefly joined Tabor's Light Cavalry, a local militia formed to keep order in the newly founded town. A few months after arriving, Texas Jack contracted a cold, which developed into pneumonia, and he died weeks later. The funeral was well-attended, and he was given full military honors, with several military companies in attendance firing a three-volley salute as his flag-draped coffin was lowered into the ground. His final resting place is Evergreen Cemetery in Leadville. Shortly after Texas Jack's death, Morlacchi returned to their home in Lowell. She never toured again.

After several years, the grave fell into disrepair, and a traveling group of comedians raised funds to provide for its upkeep. In 1908, while passing through Leadville, Cody visited the cemetery and commissioned a granite grave marker for his old friend, mistakenly listing Texas Jack's age as 39 years.

In 1980, the Texas Jack Association was formed to preserve and promote Texas Jack's memory.

In 1994, Texas Jack Omohundro was inducted into the National Cowboy & Western Heritage Museum in the Hall of Great Western Performers.
