= Alexander Robert Johnston =

Governor of Hong Kong (1812–1888)

Alexander Robert Johnston, FRS
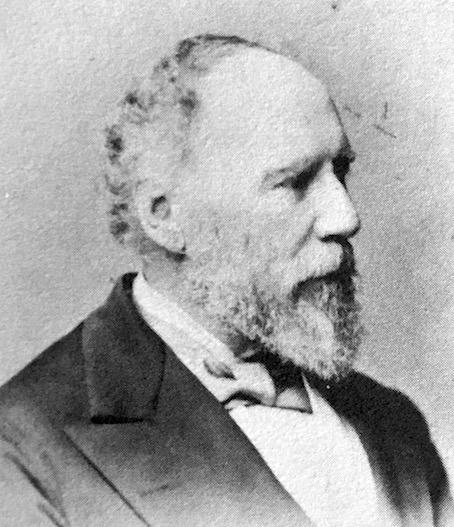

Acting Administrator of Hong Kong
- In office 13 June 1842 – 2 December 1842
- Preceded by: Henry Pottinger
- Succeeded by: Henry Pottinger
- In office 22 June 1841 – 1 February 1842
- Preceded by: Charles Elliot
- Succeeded by: Henry Pottinger

Personal details
- Born: Alexander Robert Campbell-Johnston; 14 June 1812 Colombo, Ceylon
- Died: 21 January 1888 (aged 75) San Rafael Ranch, California, United States
- Resting place: Brompton Cemetery, London, England

Alexander Robert Johnston, FRS (Note: He took the name Campbell-Johnston before 1845.) (formerly Campbell-Johnston, 14 June 1812 – 21 January 1888) was a British colonial official who served twice as Acting Administrator of Hong Kong from 1841 to 1842. He also served in the Executive and Legislative Councils of Hong Kong. He became a Fellow of the Royal Society in 1845 for his work on the natural history of China.

== Early life ==
Johnston was born on 14 June 1812 in Colombo, Ceylon, as the third son of Sir Alexander Johnston, who was Chief Justice of Ceylon. He began his career in the Colonial Office as a writer in Mauritius in 1828, and shortly after became a clerk in the Colonial Secretary's department. He remained in the Mauritius civil service until 1833, when he returned to England after economic conditions in the colony forced him to leave his post.

== China ==
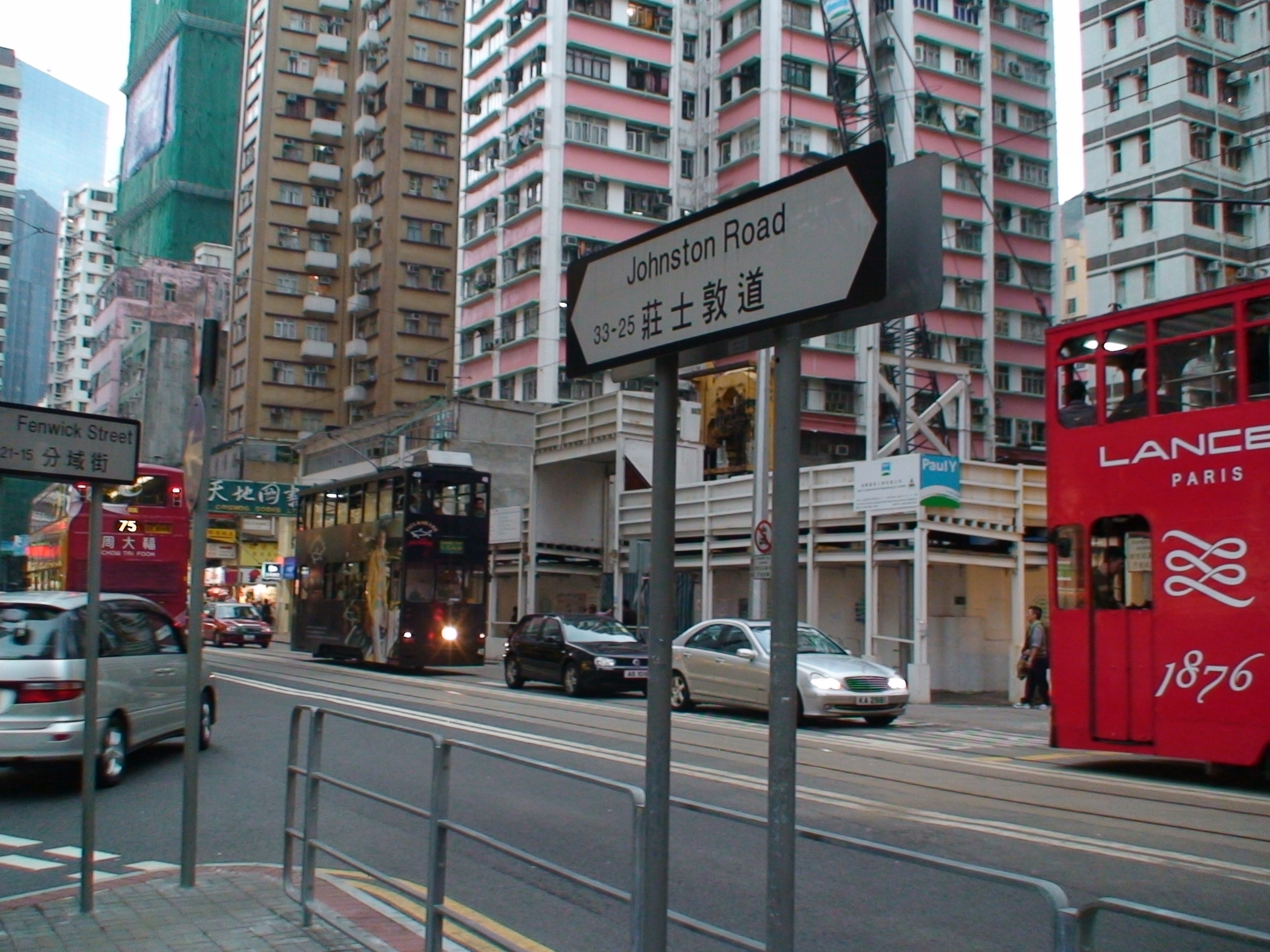
Johnston Road was formerly the Wan Chai waterfront until land reclamation in Praya East began in the 1920s.

In 1833, Johnston became Private Secretary to his cousin Lord Napier, who was sent to Canton as Chief Superintendent of Trade after the abolition of the East India Company's monopoly of the China Trade. After Napier died in October 1834, he was replaced by John Francis Davis, and Johnston became Secretary and Treasurer of the Commission. After Davis' retirement in January 1835, Johnston became Third Superintendent of Trade. In November 1836, he was promoted to Second Superintendent. In 1837, after the Commission abolished the offices of Second and Third Superintendent, he became Deputy Superintendent of Trade under Captain Charles Elliot, who was both Chief Superintendent and Plenipotentiary.

During the First Opium War, he served on board the steamship Nemesis in the expedition up the Broadway River from Macao to Canton on 13–15 March 1841. On 22 June, when Elliot prepared to join the British expeditionary force in the north during the war, he appointed Johnston as acting Administrator of Hong Kong. On 10 August, Sir Henry Pottinger arrived in China to replace Elliot as plenipotentiary. Pottinger, who arrived in Hong Kong on 22 August while on his way to the expedition, kept Johnston as acting administrator. Acting on Elliot's policy of encouraging a growing settlement, Johnston disposed land lots for development, which he classified into marine, town, and suburban. In November 1841, he sent Pottinger an account of the settlement's progress, such as the development of Queen's Road, the Magistracy, the Record Office, and a prison. Barracks were built in Stanley and a bridle path was laid towards Aberdeen. He reported that houses were being built and that many people were making applications for land. However, Pottinger criticised Johnston for granting land without elaboration of Hong Kong's future from the British government. He returned to Hong Kong on 1 February 1842. Historian Frank Welsh wrote, "He got few thanks for it, then or later, but it is largely due to Johnston's initiative that Hong Kong was allowed to develop".

When Pottinger left Hong Kong on 13 June to rejoin the expedition, Johnston was again left in charge and was told not to grant land except for barracks and the troops' families who began to arrive from Britain. In October 1842, he informed Pottinger of the crime and disorder in the colony. Piracy was frequent and isolated houses were attacked, often by gangs who landed from boats. The jail was full, but Johnston said he lacked the authority to impose sentences on the inmates awaiting trial. Such conditions helped the Colonial Office be aware of the importance of establishing full control of law and order, and the danger of allowing the Chinese to share this responsibility. On 2 December, Pottinger returned from the north, and Johnston remained Deputy Superintendent of Trade, which was changed in 1843 to the Assistant and Registrar to the Superintendent of Trade. After Pottinger became the first Governor of Hong Kong on 26 June 1843, he appointed Johnston as a member of the Executive and Legislative Councils on 21 August.

Johnston returned to England on sick leave in October 1843. He received a medal for his services on board the Nemesis during the war. He was elected a Fellow of the Royal Society on 5 June 1845 for his contributions to the natural history of China. He returned to Hong Kong in September 1845 as Secretary and Registrar to the Superintendent of Trade. In June 1846, Johnston was made a member of the Executive Council in place of Colonial Secretary Frederick Wright-Bruce who went on leave before being appointed Lieutenant-Governor of Newfoundland. After the abolition of the office of Secretary and Registrar on 25 September 1852, he obtained a compensation allowance, and retired to England in March 1853.

== Later life ==
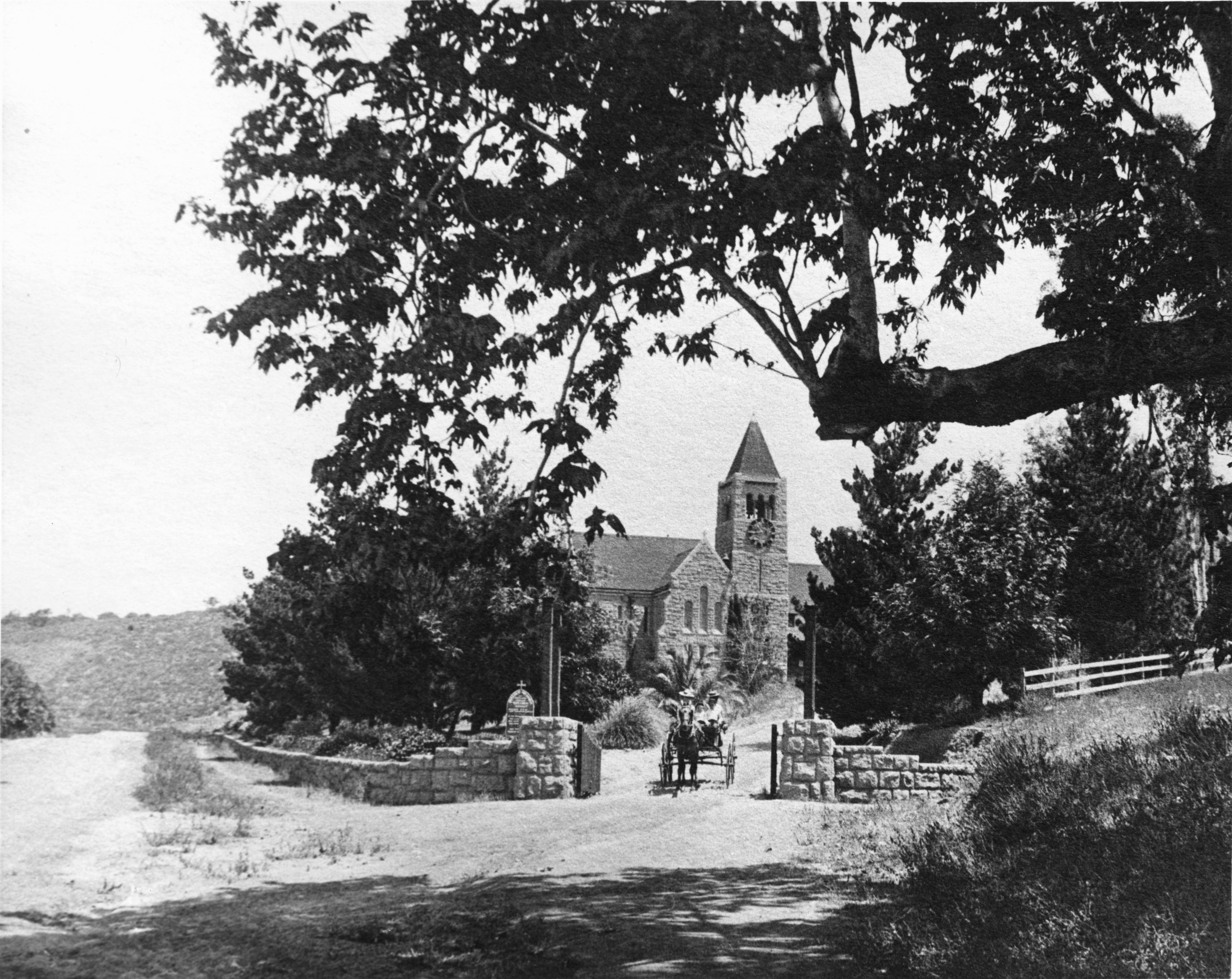
The Church of the Angels, 1898

On 30 September 1856, Johnston married Frances Ellen Palliser at St George's, Hanover Square, London. They had eight sons and two daughters, including Conway Campbell-Johnston (1859–1915), who died with his wife in the sinking of the Lusitania, and Malcolm Campbell-Johnston, who was Conservative Member of Parliament for East Ham South. Johnston resided in Suffolk, where he was a justice of the peace, and in London.

In 1883, Johnston and his wife travelled to the United States, where they visited the small town of Garvanza, California. They purchased over 2,000 acres (810 ha) of the Rancho San Rafael from Victor Beaudry (brother of businessman Prudent Beaudry) for agricultural and real estate development, and named it the San Rafael Ranch. They returned to England while their sons operated the ranch and then visited again in 1888. The ranch was used for cattle grazing and many buildings were constructed. Johnston died there on 21 January 1888.

His widow accompanied his remains back to England, being buried in Brompton Cemetery, London. She hired Arthur Edmund Street (son of architect George Edmund Street) to design the Church of the Angels as a memorial. Street's design was based on Holmbury St Mary's Church in Surrey and later modified by architect Ernest Coxhead in Los Angeles. Built in 1889, it became a registered historic landmark in Pasadena. It is the most prominent remaining structure from the Campbell-Johnston Ranch.

== Namesakes ==
- Johnston House, present-day known as the Former French Mission Building, 1, Battery Path, Central, Hong Kong
- Johnston Road, Wan Chai, Hong Kong
- Mount Johnston, Ap Lei Chau, Hong Kong
- Johnston Lake, Pasadena, California, United States

== Notes ==
Footnotes

Citations

Government offices
Preceded by Charles Elliot	Administrator of Hong Kong; Acting; 1841–1842	Succeeded by Henry Pottinger
