= Carngham (homestead) =

Historic homestead in Victoria, Australia

- Carngham Homestead (pictured 1972)

- Location in Pyrenees Shire, Victoria
- 37°34′38″S 143°33′06″E
- Type: Homestead, associated built facilities and grounds
- Location: Carngham, Victoria, Australia
- Nearest city: Ballarat

History
- Built: ~1880s (original), 1920s (latest)
- Built for: Major Philip Russell
- Demolished: 2013 (gutted by fire)

Site notes
- Restored: 1920s

Carngham is a historic pastoral property located within the namesake locality of Carngham, in the Western District of Victoria, Australia, roughly 30 kilometres west of Ballarat. Established in 1838 by the Baillie brothers, the estate was later owned by the Russell family, who developed it into a major producer of fine Merino wool. Originally encompassing 30,000 acres (12,000 ha), the property was progressively subdivided during the twentieth century, including for soldier settlement. Its historic homestead was destroyed by fire in 1918 and rebuilt in 1920, before the replacement residence was also destroyed in the January 2013 bushfires. The estate has also been used for livestock breeding, cropping and horse training.

== History ==
The Carngham pastoral run was established in early 1838 by brothers James Dennistoun Baillie and Thomas Baillie, the third and fourth sons of Sir William Baillie, 1st Baronet, of Polkemmet in Scotland. The brothers occupied 30,000 acres (12,000 ha) of grazing country west of the present city of Ballarat, where they established a sheep station. Their enterprise was affected by the financial depression of 1840–1841, which caused widespread difficulties throughout the pastoral industry of the Port Phillip District. Unable to maintain their operations, the brothers were forced to dispose of the property.

In March 1843, Carngham was sold at auction to Scottish pastoralists Robert Simson and Philip Russell for £950. The transaction included 3,500 sheep and the rights to the pastoral run. Simson and Russell went on to develop the property for sheep grazing.

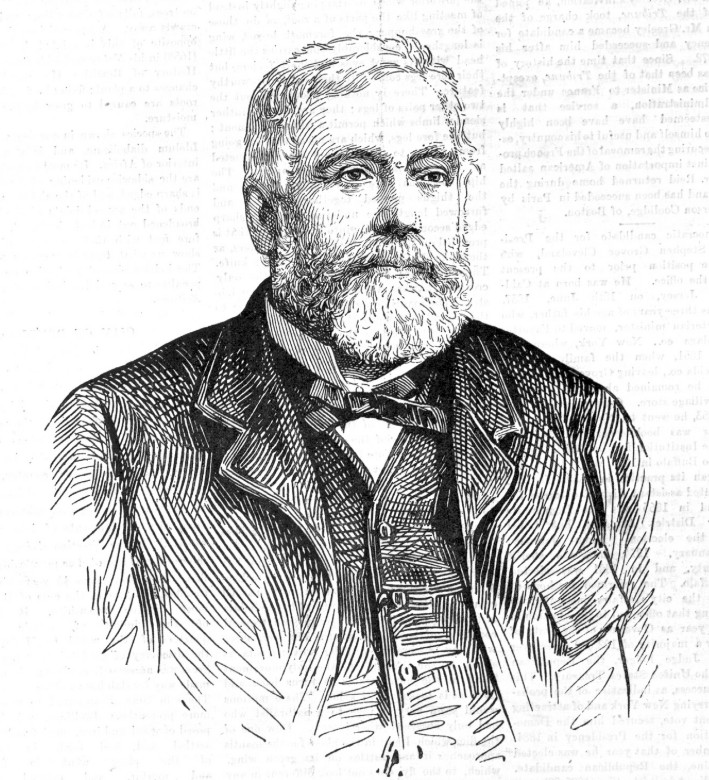
Philip Russell

During their partnership, Simson and Russell planned a new residence at Carngham that would accommodate both men and their future families. In 1851, Russell married Annie Lewis and travelled with her to Scotland, leaving Simson responsible for the estate. Simson had also married that year, to Catherine Officer. The partnership was dissolved in 1853, when Russell acquired Simson's interest and assumed sole ownership of Carngham. Simson then established himself at nearby Langi Kal Kal.

Russell devoted considerable attention to breeding merino sheep and improving the quality of the estate's wool clip. He also acquired other pastoral holdings, including Langi Willi, near Skipton, in 1859. Outside of his agricultural interests on his properties, he served for 6 years as president of the Ballarat Agricultural and Pastoral Society, and represented South Western Province in the Victorian Legislative Council between 1869 and 1875 and again from 1880 to 1886.

Improvements undertaken during the late 1880s included the construction of a schoolhouse, accommodation for station employees and stables.

Phillip Russell died at Carngham on 14 July 1892, aged 70, leaving an estate valued at £219,000. Carngham passed to his son James Russell, while another son, George, inherited Langi Willi. James continued the family's pastoral operations until his death in 1905, when the property passed to his son Philip Russell, who went on to serve in the armed forces during the First World War.

In June 1910, 3,000 acres (1,200 ha) of the Carngham estate were offered for sale by public auction. The land was divided into 19 allotments, all of which were sold, with prices ranging from £4 to £11 per acre. The auction, held on 25 June, realised more than £17,000.

The stables

On the night of 30 June 1918, the Carngham homestead was destroyed by fire while its owner, Major Philip Russell, was serving in France during the First World War. The residence contained 40 rooms and was extensively furnished, with valuable paintings and sporting trophies among its contents. The fire was believed to have begun in a servant's room after a burning log fell from a fireplace onto the floor. The flames spread rapidly through the building, and although neighbours assisted in attempting to extinguish the fire, their efforts were hindered by an insufficient water supply. All occupants escaped without injury, but only a small portion of the furniture could be recovered. The damaged was estimated at more than £6,000, with insurance covering only part of the loss.

In July 1919, the Beaufort Repatriation Committee considered a proposal by the proprietors of Carngham to make 2,000 acres (810 ha) available for the settlement of returned soldiers from Snake Valley.

Following the destruction of the original homestead, a replacement residence was constructed during the early 1920s. The new building was a substantial two-storey residence surrounded by established gardens and existing agricultural buildings.

During the early 1930s, Carngham became the subject of legal proceedings concerning its valuation for federal land taxation. Philip Russell disputed an assessment of the property's unimproved value for the 1931–1932 financial year. At the time, the estate comprised 17,177 acres (6,951 ha), and the Commonwealth had assessed its unimproved value at £72,152. The matter proceeded to the High Court of Australia, where evidence was presented concerning the productivity of the land, the quality of its merino wool and the value of improvements. On 28 March 1934, the High Court, allowed Russell's appeal, determining that the unimproved value should be assessed at £60,120.

The single men's quarters

In March 1940, bushfires in the Carngham area threatened the station and surrounding properties. Major Philip Russell, who had been scheduled to travel to Sydney to judge Devon cattle at the Sydney Royal Easter Show, cancelled his journey after fires surrounded the estate.

In January 1953, Major Russell sold 11,000 acres (4,500 ha) of Carngham to the Victorian Soldier Settlement Commission. Following the transaction, he announced plans to reduce the station's livestock holdings, including the sale of 500 cattle and the adult sheep, while retaining the lambs and stud flock.

Carngham remained an agricultural property during the latter half of the twentieth century, and in 1981, businessman and racehorse enthusiast Greg Mance, of the Windsor Smith footwear company, purchased the station. Under Mance and his wife Diane, the property operated as a horse-training and breeding establishment alongside its agricultural activities. Their racehorse "Cole Diesel" won the Caulfield Cup in 1989. The Mances owned Carngham for 25 years before selling the property in 2006.

On 8 January 2013, the homestead was destroyed by a bushfire that swept through the Chepstowe and Carngham localities. The fire burnt 1,300 ha (3,200 acres) of farmland and bushland and destroyed several houses and agricultural buildings. At Carngham, the homestead was undergoing restoration when the approaching fire forced its occupants to evacuate. Although firefighters initially attempted to protect the residence, embers ignited the roof, and the building was later consumed by flames. Another house has since been constructed on the site, although several of the property's original agricultural buildings remain intact.

== See also ==
- Langi Willi
- Ettrick
- Gala
- Poligolet
