= Giuseppina Morlacchi =

American actress (1836–1886)

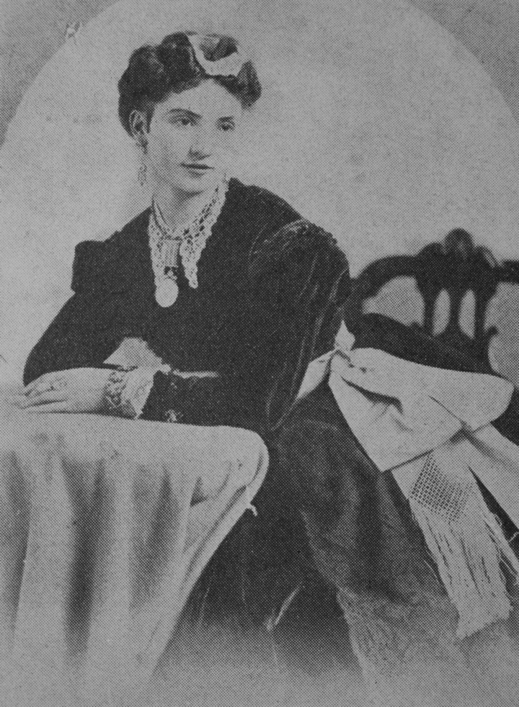
- Morlacchi in 1873
- Born: October 8, 1836; Milan, Austrian Empire
- Died: July 23, 1886 (aged 49); Billerica, Massachusetts, US
- Occupations: Ballerina and actress
- Known for: Introduced the Can-can to America
- Spouse: Texas Jack Omohundro (m. 1873)

Giuseppina Antonia "Josephine" Morlacchi Omohundro (October 8, 1836 – July 23, 1886) was an Italian American ballerina, dancer, and actress. She introduced the can-can to the American stage.

== Biography ==
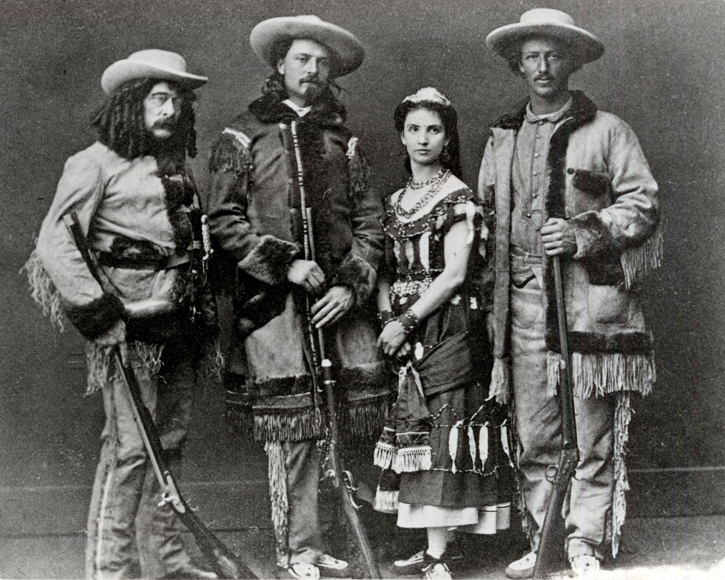
Ned Buntline, Buffalo Bill Cody, Giuseppina Morlacchi, Texas Jack Omohundro, c. 1873

Morlacchi was born in Milan in 1836 and attended dance school at La Scala at the age of six. She debuted on the stage in 1856 at Teatro Carlo Felice in Genoa. In a short time, she became a well-known dancer, touring the continent and England. In Lisbon, she met noted artist and manager Don Juan (John) De Pol, who persuaded her to go to America and perform in his DePol Parisian Ballet.

In October 1867, she made her American debut at Banvard's Museum in New York City, performing The Devil's Auction. She became an immense success, and DePol took the show to Boston. During her rise to fame, DePol insured her legs for $100,000 (equal to $2,303,571 today), after which newspapers claimed that Morlacchi was 'more valuable than Kentucky'.

On January 6, 1868, the company played at the Theatre Comique and premiered a new type of dance, billed as "...Grand Gallop Can-Can, composed and danced by Mlles. Morlacchi, Blasina, Diani, Ricci, Baretta,... accompanied with cymbals and triangles by the coryphees and corps de ballet." The new dance received an enthusiastic reception.

From 1867 though 1872, Morlacchi traveled the United States dancing in various venues with Morlacchi Ballet Troupe which she formed, performing before various politicians and dignitaries, including the Grand Duke of Russia. From then, her fame and success increased, and she played a succession of popular performances. On December 16, 1872, she was billed as a feature attraction in Ned Buntline's western drama, Scouts of the Prairie, with Buffalo Bill Cody and Texas Jack Omohundro. She and Texas Jack fell in love, and were married on August 31, 1873, at St. Mary's Catholic Church in Rochester, N.Y. The couple settled in Lowell, Massachusetts where they purchased a house known as Suffolk Hall and a country estate in Billerica, Massachusetts. Morlacchi continued to perform, both with her husband in western dramas, and with her dance troupe.

In the Spring of 1880, after performing in Denver, the couple visited the silver mining town of Leadville, Colorado where Texas Jack fell ill and a few weeks later died of pneumonia. Shortly after Texas Jack's death Morlacchi returned to their home in Lowell and lived quietly with her sister. She never toured again. Morlacchi died of cancer in 1886.

== Bibliography ==
- Kerns, Matthew (2021). Texas Jack: America's First Cowboy Star. TwoDot. ISBN 978-1-4930-5541-8.
- Logan, Herschel C. (1954). Buckskin and Satin: The Life of Texas Jack and His Wife. Harrisburg: Stackpole.
- Enss, Chris (2005). Buffalo Gals: Women of Buffalo Bill's Wild West Show. Globe Pequot. ISBN 9780762735655.
- Barker, Barbara (1984). Ballet or Ballyhoo: The American Careers of Maria Bonfanti, Rita Sangalli, and Giuseppina Morlacchi. New York: Dance Horizons. ISBN 9780871271365.
