= St. Mary's Church (Rochester, New York) =

Historic church in New York, United States

- St. Mary's Roman Catholic Church and Rectory
- U.S. National Register of Historic Places
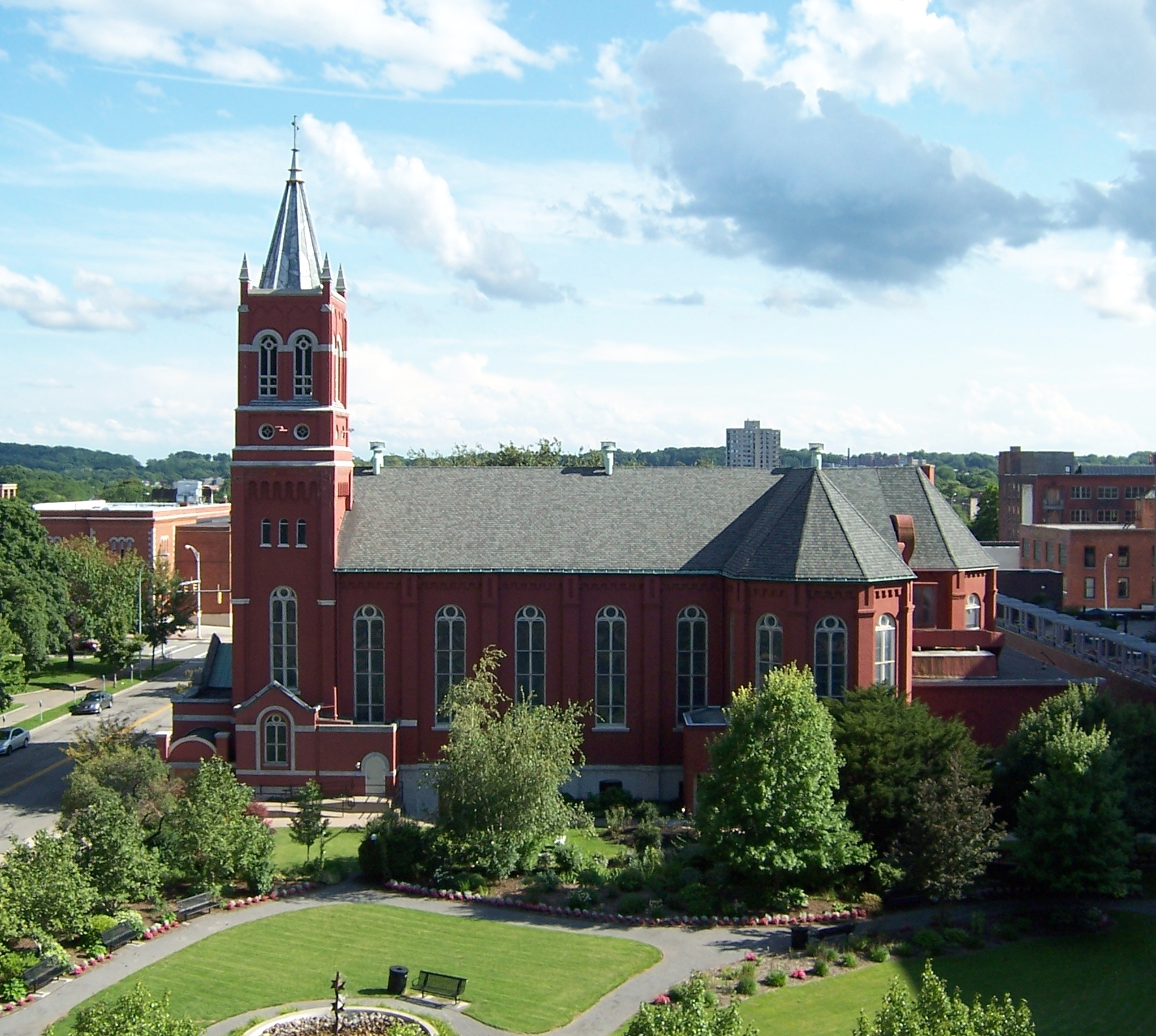
- The church building (the rectory is hidden behind)

- Location within New York Location within the United States
- Location: 15 St. Mary's Pl., Rochester, New York
- Coordinates: 43°9′12″N 77°36′23″W
- Built: 1855
- Architectural style: Mid 19th Century Revival
- MPS: Inner Loop MRA
- NRHP reference No.: 92000154
- Added to NRHP: March 12, 1992

St. Mary's Roman Catholic Church and Rectory are located in downtown Rochester, New York.

St. Mary's Parish was created in 1834 as Rochester's second Roman Catholic parish, after St. Patrick's Parish.

== Description ==
The cornerstone of the church was blessed 18 September 1853 by Bishop of Buffalo John Timon (the Diocese of Rochester was not formed until 1868). The building was dedicated, with Timon presiding, on 24 October 1858. The architect of the church is unknown, but design influences of Richard Upjohn and other church architects are apparent. It was where celebrated actress and ballerina Giuseppina Morlacchi and cowboy scout and actor Texas Jack Omohundro were married on August 31, 1873.

A brick rectory was built in 1905, replacing an earlier rectory.

A spire and belfry, designed by Richard B. Arnold, were added in 1939-1940, and a 10-note Deagan tower chime was installed in time to be played for Christmas 1939. The north tower may have been intended to have a spire originally, but financial difficulties may have precluded adding it earlier. The original cross atop the spire was felled in 2017 by a windstorm, its copper cladding having long since turned green with corrosion; it was replaced with a new gilded cross in June 2018.

The church and rectory were added to the National Register of Historic Places on 12 March 1992.
