= Charles Elliot =

British Royal Navy officer (1801–1875)

Admiral Sir Charles Elliot KCB
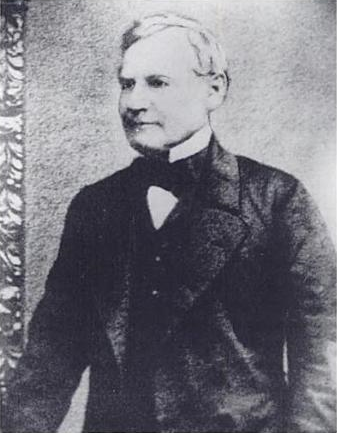

Chief Superintendent of British Trade in China
- In office 14 December 1836 – 12 August 1841
- Preceded by: Sir George Robinson
- Succeeded by: Sir Henry Pottinger

Administrator of Hong Kong
- In office 26 January 1841 – 12 August 1841
- Monarch: Victoria
- Preceded by: Office established
- Succeeded by: Alexander Johnston (Acting)

Governor of Bermuda
- In office 25 December 1846 – 13 February 1854
- Preceded by: Sir William Reid
- Succeeded by: Freeman Murray

Governor of Trinidad
- In office 10 March 1854 – 27 October 1856
- Preceded by: George Harris
- Succeeded by: Robert Keate

Governor of Saint Helena
- In office 3 July 1863 – 29 January 1870
- Preceded by: Sir Edward Hay
- Succeeded by: Charles Patey

Personal details
- Born: 15 August 1801 Dresden, Saxony, Holy Roman Empire
- Died: 9 September 1875 (aged 74) Exmouth, Devon, England, United Kingdom
- Resting place: St John in the Wilderness, Exmouth, England
- Spouse: Clara Windsor
- Children: 5
- Parent(s): Hugh Elliot; Margaret Jones

Admiral Sir Charles Elliot KCB (15 August 1801 – 9 September 1875) was a British Royal Navy officer, diplomat, and colonial administrator. He became the first Administrator of Hong Kong in 1841 while serving as both Plenipotentiary and Chief Superintendent of British Trade in China. He was a key founder in the establishment of Hong Kong as a British colony.

Born in Dresden, Saxony, Elliot joined the Royal Navy in 1815 and served as a midshipman in the bombardment of Algiers against Barbary pirates the following year. After serving in the East Indies Station for four years, he joined the Home Station in 1820. He joined the West Africa Squadron and became a lieutenant in 1822. After serving in the West Indies Station, he was promoted to captain in 1828. He met Clara Windsor in Haiti and they married in 1828.

After retiring from active naval service, Elliot followed a career in the Foreign Office. From 1830 to 1833, he was Protector of Slaves in Guiana. In 1834, he went to China as Master Attendant to the staff of Chief Superintendent Lord Napier. He became Plenipotentiary and Chief Superintendent from 1836 to 1841. From 1842 to 1846, Elliot was chargé d'affaires and consul general in the Republic of Texas. He served as Governor of Bermuda (1846–54), Governor of Trinidad (1854–56), and Governor of Saint Helena (1863–70). He was made a Knight Commander of the Order of the Bath in 1856.

== Early life ==
Elliot was born in Dresden, Saxony, on 15 August 1801 to Margaret and Hugh Elliot. He was one of nine children. His uncle was Scottish diplomat Gilbert Elliott, 1st Earl of Minto. He was educated at Reading School in Reading, Berkshire, England.

On 26 March 1815, Elliot joined the Royal Navy as a first-class volunteer on board HMS Leviathan, which served in the Mediterranean Station. In July 1816, he became a midshipman on board HMS Minden, in which he served in the bombardment of Algiers against Barbary pirates in August 1816. He then served in the East Indies Station for four years under Sir Richard King. In 1820, he joined the cutter Starling under Lieutenant-Commander John Reeve in the Home Station, and HMS Queen Charlotte under James Whitshed.

== West Africa and West Indies ==
In 1821, Elliot joined HMS Iphigenia under Sir Robert Mends in the West Africa Squadron. On 11 June 1822, he became a lieutenant while serving in HMS Myrmidon under Captain Henry John Leeke. He again served in the Iphigenia on 19 June, and in HMS Hussar under Captain George Harris in the West Indies Station. There, he was appointed to the schooners Union on 19 June 1825 and Renegade on 30 August. On 1 January 1826, he was nominated acting-commander of the convalescent ship Serapis in Port Royal, Jamaica, where on 14 April, he served in the hospital ship Magnificent. After further employment on board HMS Bustard and HMS Harlequin, he was promoted to captain on 28 August 1828.

=== Guiana ===
After retiring from active naval service, Elliot followed a career in the Foreign Office. In 1830, the Colonial Office sent Elliot to Demerara in British Guiana to be Protector of Slaves and a member of the Court of Policy from 1830 to 1833. He was brought home to advise the government of administrative problems relating to the Slavery Abolition Act 1833. In a letter to the Treasury in 1833, Prime Minister Lord Howick wrote:

Lord Goderich [Secretary of State for the Colonies] feels himself bound to acknowledge that His Majesty's Government are indebted to him [Elliot], not only for a zealous and efficient execution of the duties of his office, but for communications of peculiar value and importance sent from the Colony during the last twelve months, and for essential services rendered at a critical period since his arrival in this country ... Elliot has contributed far beyond what the functions of his particular office required of him.

== China ==
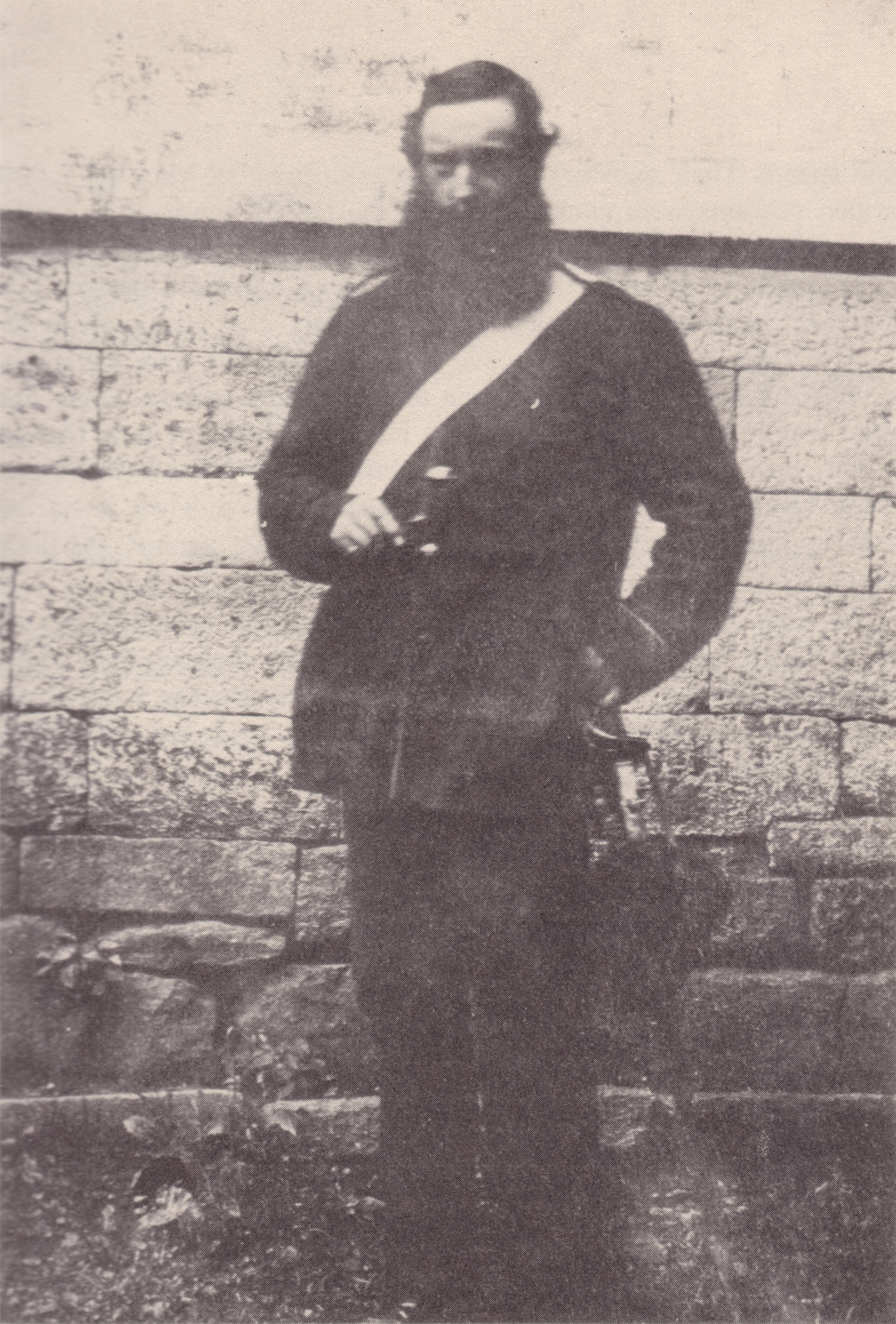
Captain Charles Elliot

In late 1833, Elliot was appointed as Master Attendant to the staff of Lord Napier, Chief Superintendent of British Trade in China. His position was involved with British ships and crews operating between Macao and Canton. He was appointed Secretary in October 1834, Third Superintendent in January 1835, and Second Superintendent in April 1835. In 1836, the office of Chief Superintendent was abolished and its duties were transferred to the newly created Chief of the commission. Foreign Secretary Lord Palmerston appointed Elliot to this post, however Elliot continued to use the title of "Chief Superintendent" in his official correspondence. On 16 November 1839, Elliot wrote to Palmerston regarding the opium trade: "No man entertains a deeper detestation of the disgrace and sin of this forced traffic on the coast of China. I have steadily discountenanced it by all the lawful means in my power, and at the total sacrifice of my private comfort in the society in which I have lived for some years past."

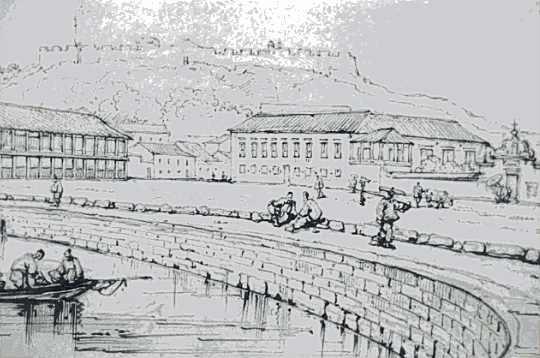
Elliot's residence at the San Francisco Green in Macao

In March 1839, Lin Zexu in Canton demanded European merchants surrender their opium. When they refused, he quarantined them and surrounded their factories. Captain Elliot arrived with 20,283 chests of British opium, valued at £2,000,000. Merchants, believing Elliot would safeguard it, were appalled when he surrendered it to Lin. Elliot claimed he acted for the quarantined British community. After confiscating the opium, Lin ordered all merchants involved in the trade to leave China. Elliot and the merchants complied when the situation was very tense, and Lin subsequently destroyed the opium by dumping it into Canton Bay. In order to make the obstinate merchants comply with the order, Elliot promised the merchants British government compensation when he had no authority to do so. The joke among the happy opium merchants was that Queen Victoria was now the biggest buyer of their opium. Thus the Parliament later disagreed, believing China should pay any reparations. Frustrated by the lack of compensation, William Jardine, who had left Canton before Lin's arrival, began planning to force compensation from China through warfare, aiming to sway public and government opinion in Britain.

During the First Opium War, he was on board the East India Company steamer Nemesis during most of the battles. In January 1841, he negotiated terms with Chinese Imperial Commissioner Qishan in the Convention of Chuenpi. Elliot declared via a circular, among other terms, the cession of Hong Kong Island to the United Kingdom. However, Palmerston recalled Elliot and, accusing him of disobedience and treating his instructions as "waste paper", dismissed him. Henry Pottinger was appointed to replace him as plenipotentiary in May 1841. On 29 July, HMS Phlegeton arrived in Hong Kong with dispatches informing Elliot of the news. Pottinger arrived in Macao on 10 August, and announced two days later that Elliot's arrangements with Hong Kong would remain in place. On 24 August, Elliot left Macao with his family for England. As he embarked on the Atlanta, a Portuguese fort fired a 13-gun salute.

Historian George Endacott wrote, "Elliot's policy of conciliation, leniency, and moderate war aims was unpopular all round, and aroused some resentment among the naval and military officers of the expedition." Responding to the accusation that "It has been particularly objected to me that I have cared too much for the Chinese", Elliot wrote to Foreign Secretary Lord Aberdeen on 25 June 1842:

But I submit that it has been caring more for lasting British honour and substantial British interests, to protect friendly and helpful people, and to return the confidence of the great trading population of the Southern Provinces, with which it is our chief purpose to cultivate more intimate, social and commercial relations.

== Later life ==
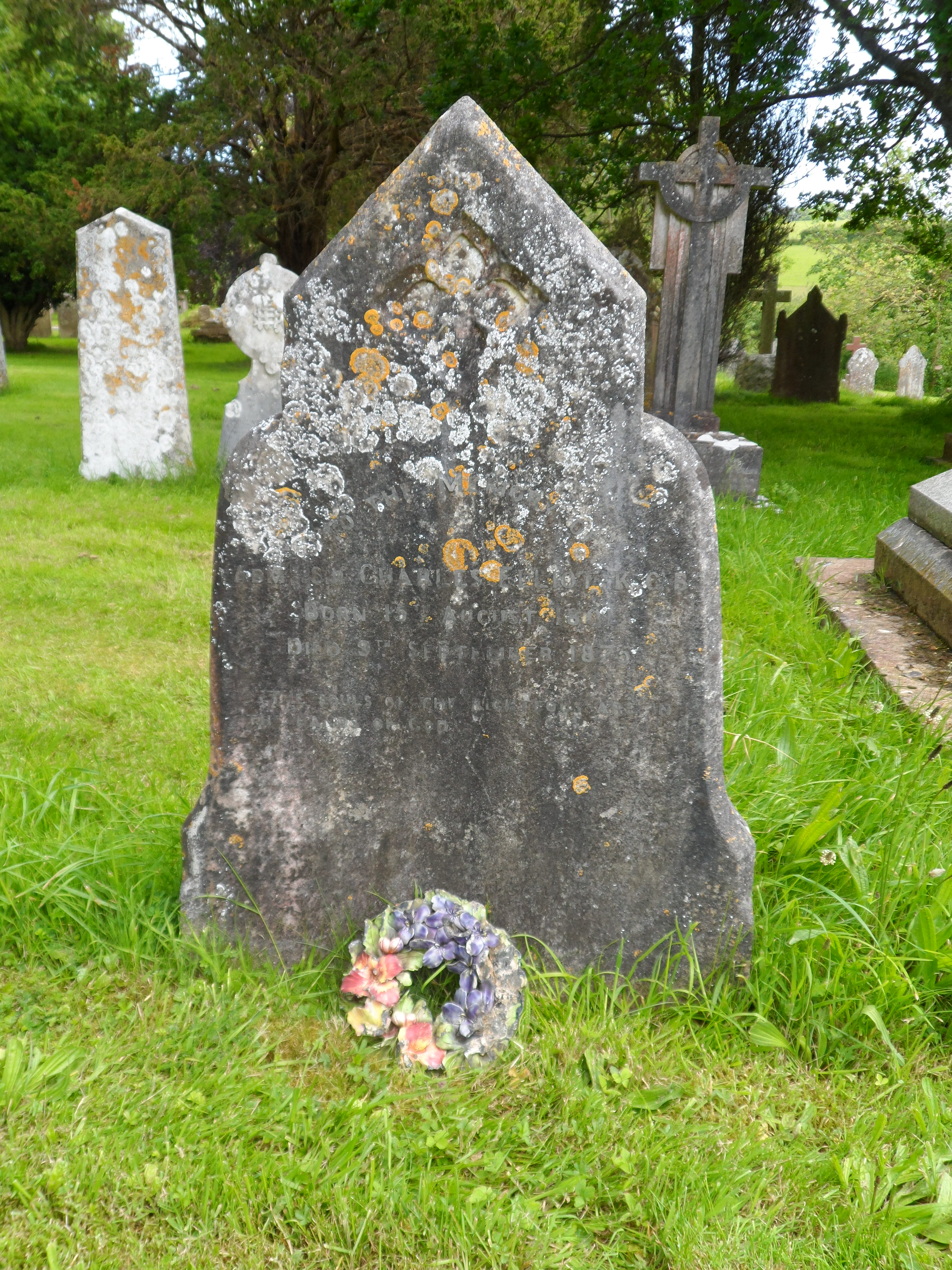
Elliot's grave at St John in the Wilderness, Exmouth

On 23 August 1842, Elliot arrived in the Republic of Texas, where he was chargé d'affaires and consul general until 1846. He worked for the abolition of slavery, the establishment of free trade, and a peace treaty between Texas and Mexico. Since an independent Texas would be advantageous to the United Kingdom, Elliot campaigned against annexation by the United States. However, the Texans voted for annexation and he was recalled to England.

Elliot served as Governor of Bermuda from 1846 to 1854. He supported the implementation of the mark system by penal reformer Alexander Maconochie in the Bermuda hulks. He later served as Governor of Trinidad from 1854 to 1856 and Governor of Saint Helena from 1863 to 1870. In St. Helena, Elliot supported botanist Joseph Hooker's plan to culture the Cinchona plant on mountainous parts of the island. A gardener was sent from the Royal Botanic Gardens, Kew, and Cinchona plantations soon sprang up near Diana's Peak.

In the retired list, he was promoted to rear-admiral on 2 May 1855, vice-admiral on 15 January 1862, and admiral on 12 September 1865. In Sir Henry Taylor's play, Edwin the Fair (1842), the character Earl Athulf was based on Elliot. Taylor also mentioned Elliot in his poem, "Heroism in the Shade" (1845). Elliot was made a Knight Commander of the Most Honourable Order of the Bath in 1856. He died in retirement at Withycombe Raleigh, Exmouth, Devon, England, on 9 September 1875. He is buried in the churchyard of St John in the Wilderness, Exmouth. The weathered headstone inscription to his grave reads in worn lead lettering: "To the memory of / Adm Sir Charles Elliot KCB / Born 15th August 1801 / Died 9th September 1875 / The souls of the righteous are in the hands of God". This is the only known memorial to him anywhere in the world.

== Marriage and family ==
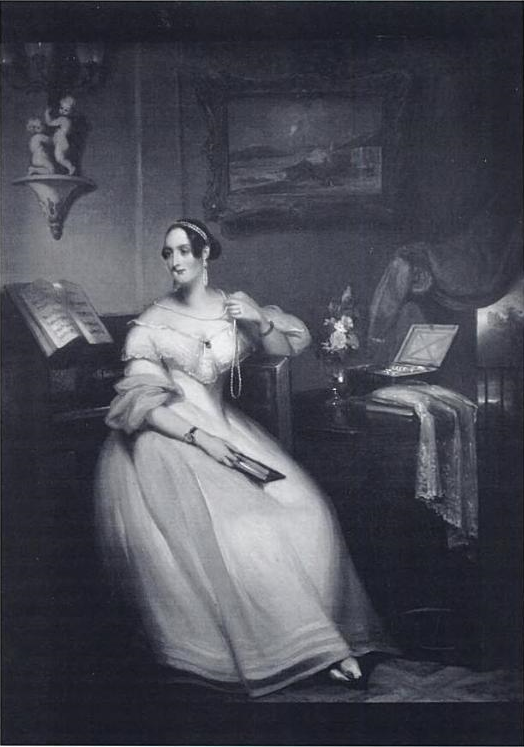
A portrait possibly of Elliot's wife Clara in Macao, c. 1838

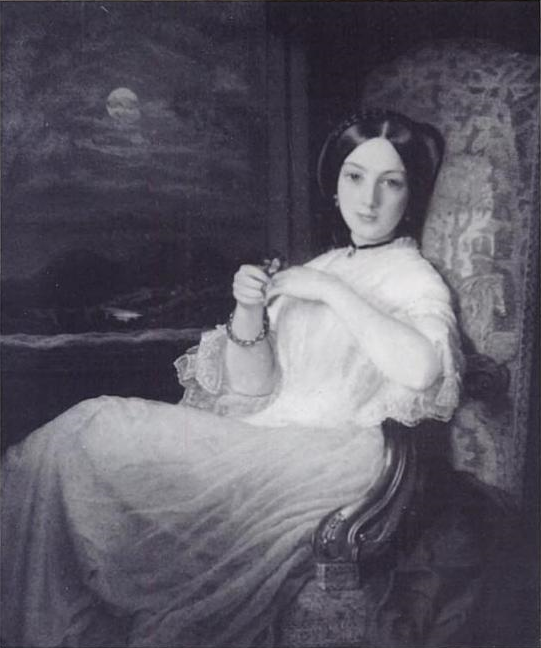
Elliot's eldest child, Harriet

During Elliot's naval service in the West Indies, he met Clara Genevieve Windsor (1806–1885) in Haiti, where she was born and raised. They married in 1828, and had two daughters and three sons:

- Harriet Agnes Elliot (1829–1896); married Edward Russell, 23rd Baron de Clifford, in 1853; four children.
- Hugh Hislop Elliot (1831–1861); Captain 1st Bombay Light Cavalry; married Louise Sidonie Perrin on 15 March 1860 in Byculla, Bombay; no known children; died at sea and memorialised in St James Cathedral, St Helena.
- Gilbert Wray Elliot (1833–1910); Bombay Civil Service; married three times, one child to each marriage; studied at the East India Company College; weightlifter Launceston Elliot was his son by his third marriage.
- Frederick Eden Elliot (1837–1916); Bengal Civil Service; married in 1861; four children.
- Emma Clara Elliot (1842–1865); married George Barrow Pennell in 1864 in St Helena, where her father was governor; one child. She died in St Helena where she is memorialised in St James Cathedral.

Elliot's wife accompanied him to Guiana from 1830 to 1833, and to China from 1834 to 1841 as well as to all of his subsequent postings around the world. After ten years of widowhood, she died on 17 October 1885, aged 80, at The Bury, the home of her husband's nephew Captain (RN retired) Hugh Maximilian Elliot in Hemel Hempstead, Hertfordshire. She is buried at the Heath Lane Cemetery, Hemel Hempstead, where a stone cross bears a worn inscription to her memory.

== Namesakes ==
- Elliot's Vale; renamed Glenealy, Central, Hong Kong
- Elliot Island, Chusan Archipelago, China (the name endured in maps into the 20th century)
- Port Elliot, South Australia

== Notes ==
Government offices
Preceded by Sir George Robinson	Chief Superintendent of British Trade in China; 1836–1841	Succeeded by Sir Henry Pottinger
New office	Administrator of Hong Kong; 1841	Succeeded by Alexander Johnston as Acting Administrator
Preceded by William Hutchinson as Acting Governor	Governor of Bermuda; 1846–1852	Succeeded by William Hassell Eden as Acting Governor
Preceded by Arthur William Byles as Acting Governor	Governor of Bermuda; 1853–1854	Succeeded by Montgomery Williams as Acting Governor
Preceded by Legendre Charles Bourchier as Acting Governor	Governor of Trinidad; 1854–1856	Succeeded by B. Brooks as Acting Governor
Preceded by Sir Edward Hay	Governor of Saint Helena; 1863–1870	Succeeded by Charles Patey
