= Langi Willi =

Historic homestead in Victoria, Australia

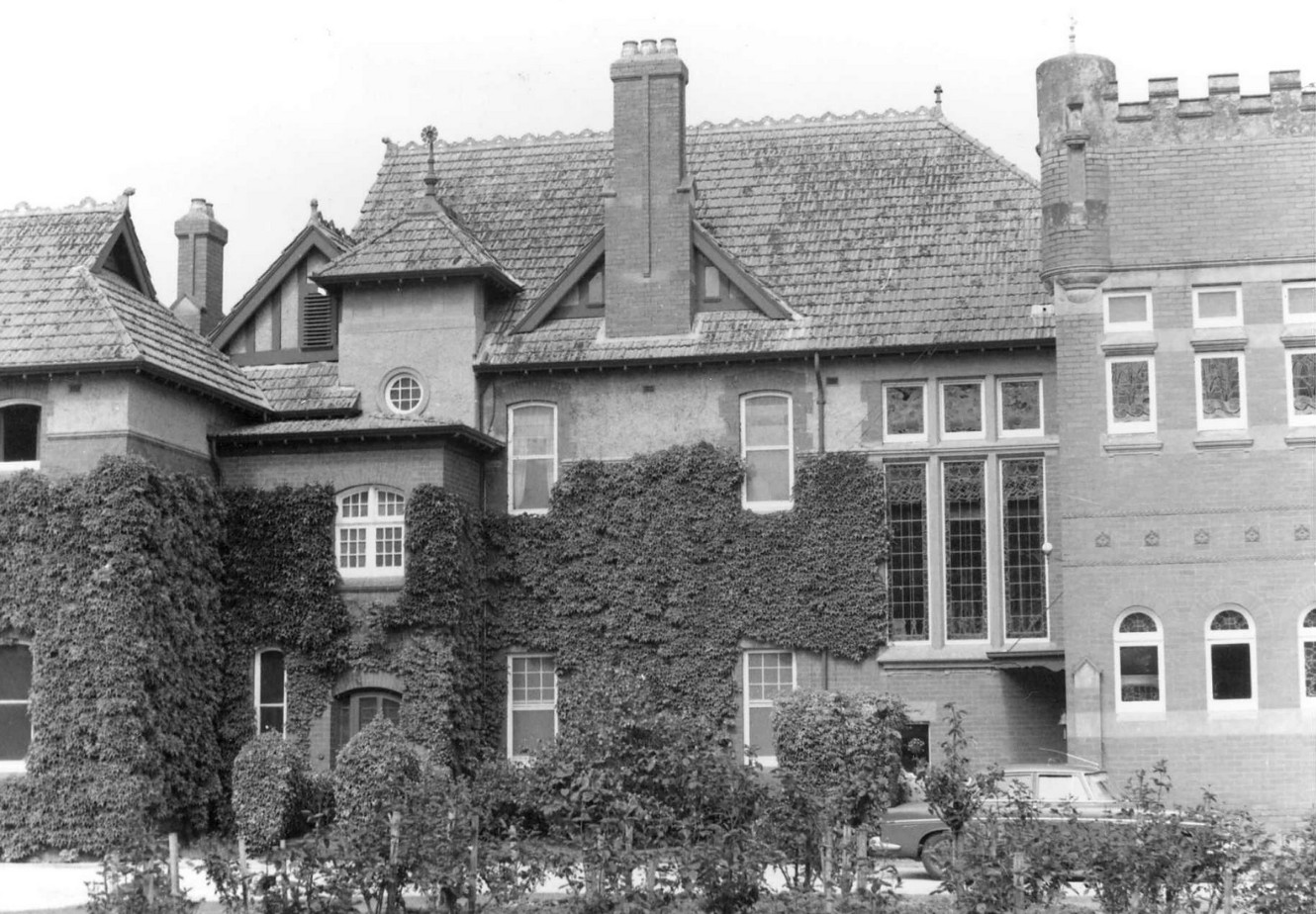
- Langi Willi

- Location in Corangamite Shire, Victoria
- 37°40′22″S 143°26′12″E
- Type: Homestead, associated built facilities and grounds
- Location: Skipton, Victoria, Australia
- Nearest city: Ballarat

History
- Built: 1903
- Built for: George Russell

Site notes
- Architect: Charles D'Ebro
- Architectural style: Arts and Crafts

Langi Willi is a historic pastoral property near Skipton in the Western District of Victoria, Australia. The property has been associated with the Russell family since 1859 and has remained in the family for more than 150 years. It is centred on a 35-room Arts and Crafts homestead designed by architect Charles D'Ebro and completed in 1903, surrounded by extensive gardens and a range of historic farm buildings. Langi Willi developed principally as a fine-wool Merino property and was historically one of the district's prominent pastoral estates.

== History ==
The land that became Langi Willi was initially occupied under pastoral leases during the late 1830s. William Wright and James Montgomery leased approximately 24,374 acres (9,865 ha) from the Crown before selling the property to William Mitchell in 1852. Mitchell gave the station the name Langi Willi, meaning "home of the green grass parrot".

In 1853 the station was visited by the young English writer Henry Kingsley, who had arrived in Australia less than a year earlier after an unsuccessful attempt to make his fortune on the Ballarat goldfields. Kingsley was travelling as a swaggie when Mitchell offered him accommodation at Langi Willi and noticed that he appeared unwell. Kingsley remained at the station for several weeks, during which time he began writing his novel The Recollections of Geoffry Hamlyn, later published in the United Kingdom. He also painted watercolours of the district, one of which subsequently entered the Mitchell Library in Sydney.

Langi Willi was sold in 1859 to Philip Russell, James Aitken and Andrew Porteous. Apart from a five-year period beginning in 1867, when Russell leased his share to Aitken, the property remained associated with the Russell family thereafter. Philip Russell subsequently left Langi Willi to his son George Russell, establishing the family's long-term connection with the property.

During the nineteenth century Langi Willi was primarily a sheep station. The natural grasslands were considered better suited to fine-wool production than meat production, and the property developed a notable Merino flock. Early stud rams were obtained from Carngham, followed by stock from Tasmania, Yass and Rokewood. The station eventually comprised approximately 33,000 acres (13,355 ha) and was capable of carrying about one sheep per acre. Kangaroo grass was widespread across the property and was periodically burned, traditionally every three years, to return nutrients to the soil. Shearing was carried out by hand until 1964. One of the station's shearers was Eric Wilkie, who won the Victorian blade-shearing championship on several occasions and recorded a tally of 370 sheep in a single day.

George Russell was an enthusiastic horseman and competed in steeplechases with thoroughbreds including Busarco, Nimrod and Domino. He also attempted to establish an ostrich farm after importing birds from South Africa, intending to harvest their feathers. The ostriches became notorious for attacking railway surveyors and knocking over their surveying equipment. Russell opposed the Victorian Government's proposal to extend the railway from Linton to Skipton, partly because the line would cut through Langi Willi. Despite his opposition, the railway was completed, and the first train reached Skipton in 1916.

The Langi Willi homestead was rebuilt on a much larger scale in 1903, when architect Charles D'Ebro designed a 35-room Arts and Crafts residence for George Russell. The house includes 11 bedrooms, seven bathrooms, a large entrance hall, kitchen and multiple living areas. It became the centre of an extensive landscaped estate, with approximately 8 acres (3.25 ha) of gardens, two tennis courts and, later, a swimming pool and pool house. The property also includes two additional houses and a historic mill.

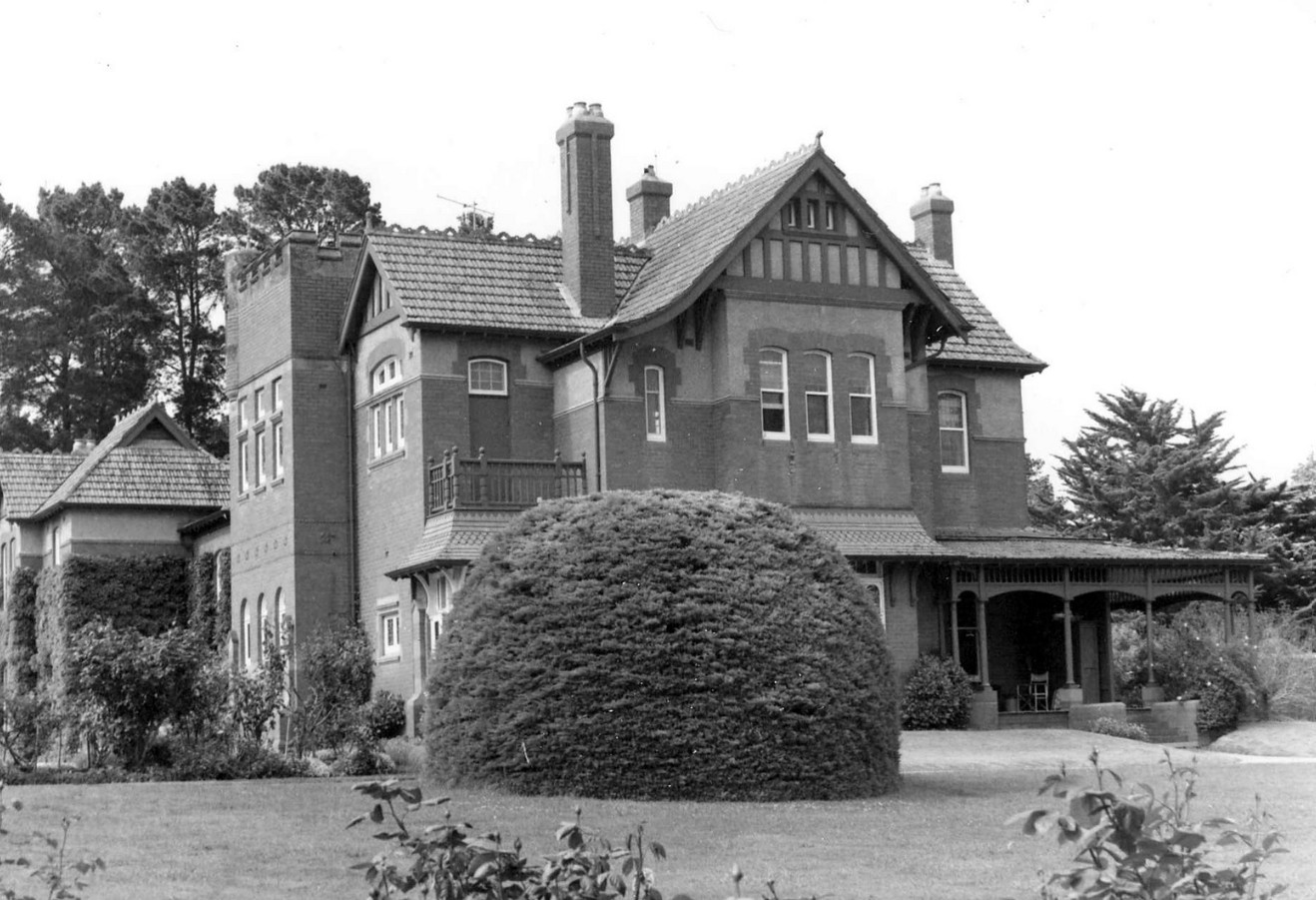
Another view of the homestead

The estate's historic farm buildings include the bluestone Sheepwash Cottage, constructed in the 1880s, while the coach house, tack room and stalls date from the 1850s. The driveway to the homestead is lined with cedars of Lebanon.

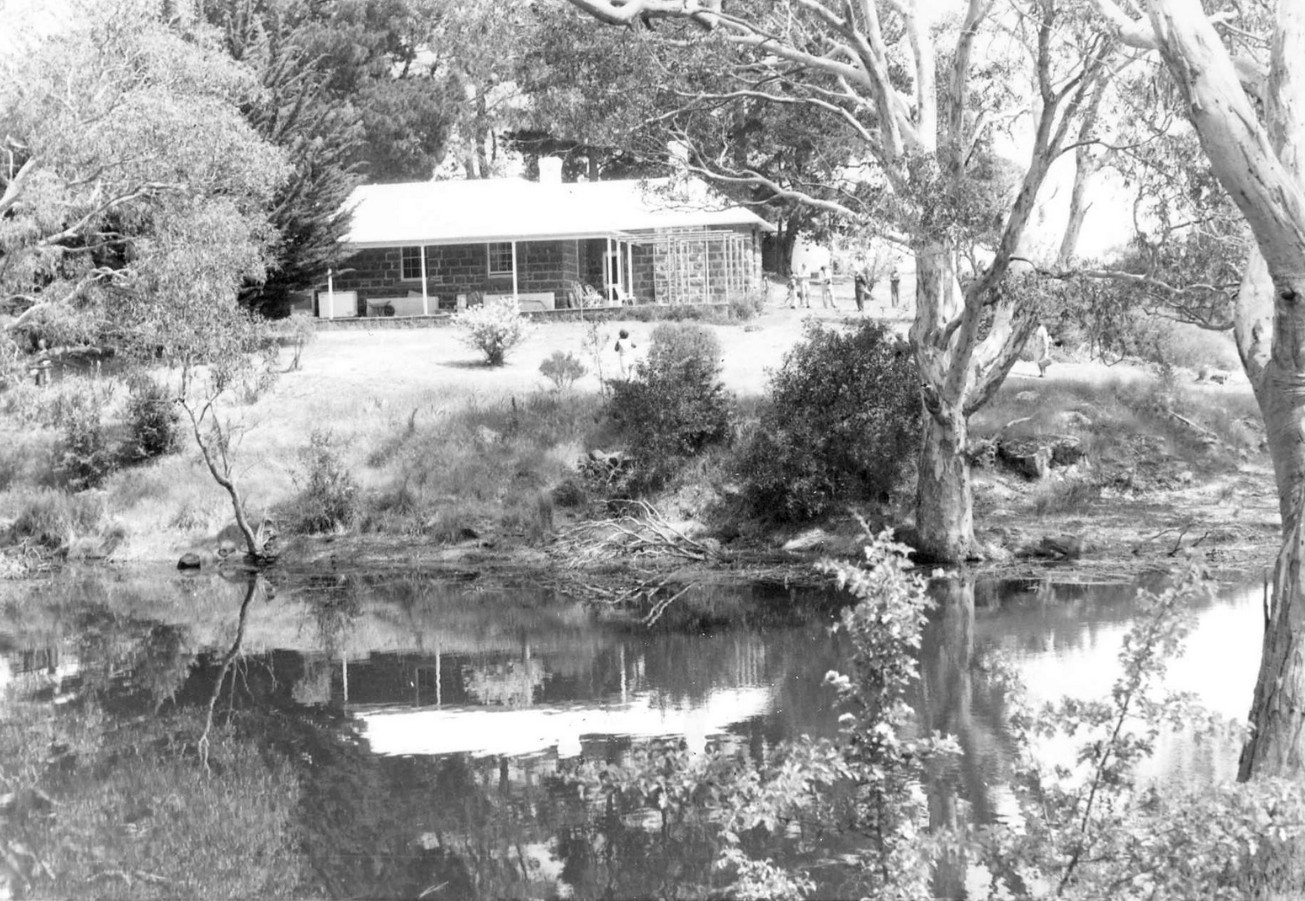
The Sheepwash Cottage

George Russell's ownership of Langi Willi was also marked by a major fire in February 1905. A fire broke out in the southern portion of the estate near Spring Hill and eventually burned approximately 2,000 acres of grass, together with fencing and several sheep. A large number of people assisted in fighting the fire, which was brought under control by early afternoon.

A young Fletcher Jones, who later established a large Victorian clothing business, visited the Langi Willi shearing shed in 1912 carrying two shillings and attempted to sell singlets and boots to the shearers. The station also became a gathering place for prominent visitors, with members of the royal family, governors, prime ministers, test cricketers and Davis Cup tennis players among those subsequently entertained at the property.

George Russell died in 1914, after which Langi Willi continued to be held within his estate. His daughters Jean Mackinnon and Joyce Yencken subsequently became associated with the property, with ownership later passing among their descendants, including the Mackinnon, McKenzie, Yencken and Darling families. The property remained under the management of members of the Funston family for three generations between 1868 and 1948, when Francis Funston, Frank Funston and another Francis Funston successively managed the station.

The construction of the railway to Skipton was accompanied by increasing pressure to subdivide the large Langi Willi estate for agricultural settlement. In February 1916, trustees had decided to subdivide 3,616 acres of the estate in the Skipton township area into farms of various sizes for auction. The subdivision was expected to assist the development of Skipton by making land available for wheat and other agricultural production.

Jean Mackinnon lived at Langi Willi for most of her life and died in 1994, aged 82. She was married to Ewen Daniel "Dan" Mackinnon, a former member for Corangamite in the Australian Parliament and Australian ambassador to Argentina. In 1972, Jean Mackinnon wrote a history of Langi Willi in which she recorded memories of her father, the family's pastoral activities and the development of the property.

From the 1980s, William "Bill" Mackinnon (Jean's son) and his English-born wife Judy spent much of their weekends at Langi Willi while living in Melbourne, undertaking extensive work on the homestead and maintaining its gardens over a period of nearly three decades.

By the late 2010s, Mark Mackinnon, a great-grandson of George Russell, had become the sole owner of Langi Willi. By then the property comprised approximately 5,000 acres (2,023 ha) and was operated in conjunction with approximately 3,200 acres (1,295 ha) at nearby Mooramong, leased from the National Trust of Victoria.

In 2019, Langi Willi was offered for sale for more than $5 million AUD.

== See also ==
- Geelong Grammar School
- Carngham
- Mawallok
- Ercildoune
