= Reid baronets of Ewell Grove =

Escutcheon of the Reid baronets of Ewell Grove

The Reid baronetcy, of Ewell Grove in the County of Surrey and of Graystone Park in the County of Dumfries, was created in the Baronetage of the United Kingdom on 10 November 1823 for Thomas Reid. The title became extinct on the death of the 4th Baronet in 1903.

== Reid baronets, of Ewell Grove (1823) ==
- Sir Thomas Reid, 1st Baronet (1762–1824)
- Sir John Rae Reid, 2nd Baronet (1791–1867)
- Sir John Rae Reid, 3rd Baronet (1841–1885)
- Sir Henry Valentine Rae Reid, 4th Baronet (1845–1903)

== Notes ==
Baronetage of the United Kingdom
Preceded by Forbes baronets	Reid baronets of Ewell Grove; 10 November 1823	Succeeded by Robinson baronets
