= John Francis Davis =

British diplomat and sinologist (1795-1890)

Sir John Francis Davis Bt KCB FRS
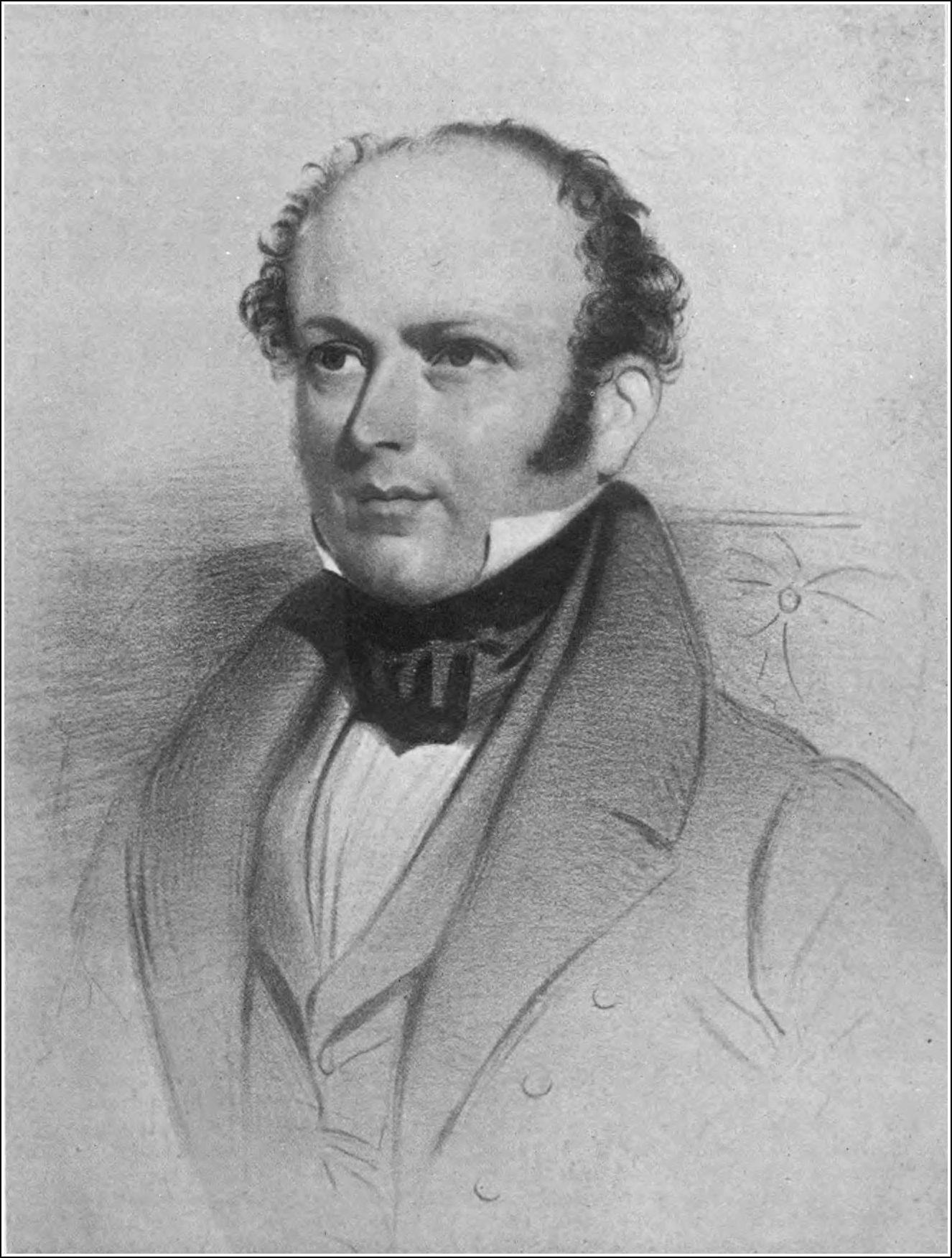

2nd Governor of Hong Kong
- In office 8 May 1844 – 21 March 1848
- Monarch: Victoria
- Lieutenant: Sir George D'Aguilar; William Staveley
- Preceded by: Sir Henry Pottinger
- Succeeded by: Sir George Bonham

Chief Superintendent of British Trade in China
- In office 8 May 1844 – 21 March 1848
- Preceded by: Sir Henry Pottinger
- Succeeded by: Sir George Bonham
- In office 11 October 1834 – 19 January 1835
- Preceded by: Lord Napier
- Succeeded by: Sir George Robinson

Personal details
- Born: 16 July 1795 London, England
- Died: 13 November 1890 (aged 95) Henbury, United Kingdom
- Resting place: All Saints Church, Compton Greenfield, England
- Spouse(s): Emily Humfrays (1822–1866); Lucy Locke (1867–1890)
- Children: 6 daughters, 2 sons

Chinese name
- Chinese: 戴維斯
Transcriptions
Yue: Cantonese
- Sidney Lau: Daai^{3} Wai^{4} Si^{1}

Sir John Francis Davis, 1st Baronet KCB FRS (16 July 1795 – 13 November 1890) was a British diplomat and sinologist who served as second Governor of Hong Kong from 1844 to 1848. Davis was the first President of Royal Asiatic Society Hong Kong.

== Background ==
Davis was the eldest son of East India Company director and amateur artist Samuel Davis while his mother was Henrietta Boileau, member of a refugee French noble family who had come to England in the early eighteenth century from Languedoc in the south of France.

== Career ==
In 1813, Davis was appointed writer at the East India Company's factory in Canton (now Guangzhou), China, at the time the centre of trade with China. Having demonstrated the depth of his learning in the Chinese language in his translation of The Three Dedicated Rooms ("San-Yu-Low") in 1815, he was chosen to accompany Lord Amherst on his embassy to Peking in 1816.

On the mission's return Davis returned to his duties at the Canton factory, and was promoted to president in 1832. He was elected a Fellow of the Royal Society the same year.

Davis was appointed Second Superintendent of British Trade in China alongside Lord Napier in December 1833, superseding William Henry Chicheley Plowden in the latter's absence. After Napier's death in 1834, Davis became Chief Superintendent then resigned his position in January 1835, to be replaced by Sir George Robinson. Davis left Canton aboard the Asia on 12 January.

In 1839, Davis purchased the Regency mansion Holly House, near Henbury, Bristol, where he built an observatory tower built housing a clock installed by Edward John Dent, who would later be responsible for building Big Ben. It remained the Davis family home for seven decades thereafter.

=== Governor of Hong Kong ===
Having arrived from Bombay on HMS Spiteful on 7 May 1844, he was appointed governor and commander-in-chief of Hong Kong the next day. During his tenure, Davis was unpopular with Hong Kong residents and British merchants due to the imposition of various taxes, which increased the burden of all citizens, and his abrasive treatment of his subordinates. Davis organised the first Hong Kong Census in 1844, which recorded that there were 23,988 people living in Hong Kong.

In the same year, Davis exhorted China to abandon the prohibition on opium trade, on the basis of its counter productiveness, relating that, in England,

... the system of prohibitions and high duties ... only increased the extent of smuggling, together with crimes of violence, while they diminished the revenue; until it was a length found that the fruitless expense of a large preventive force absorbed much of the amount of duty that could be collected, while prohibited articles were consumed more than ever.

Weekend horse racing began during his tenure, which gradually evolved into a Hong Kong institution. Davis founded the China Branch of the Royal Asiatic Society in 1847 and he was its first president.

Davis left office on 21 March 1848, ending unrelenting tensions with local British merchants who saw him as a stingy, arrogant and obstinate snob. His early decision to exclude all but government officials from the Executive and Legislative Councils on the basis that "almost every person possessed of Capital, who is not connected with Government Employment, is employed in the Opium trade" could not have made co-operation any easier. He departed the colony on 30 March via the P&O steamer Pekin. He returned to England, where he rejoined Emily, who had stayed there throughout his governorship.

== Personal life ==
Davis married Emily, the daughter of Lieutenant Colonel Humfrays of the Bengal Engineers in 1822. They had one son and six daughters:

- Sulivan (13 January 1827 – 1862); died in Bengal.
- Henrietta Anne
- Emily Nowell; married Reverend D. A. Beaufort in 1851, eldest son of Francis Beaufort, the inventor of the eponymous wind scale.
- Julia Sullivan; married Robert Cann Lippincott in 1854
- Helen Marian (died 31 January 1859)
- Florence
- Eliza (died 20 October 1855)

In 1867, a year after the death of his wife Emily, Davis married Lucy Ellen, eldest daughter of Reverend T. J. Locke, vicar of Exmouth, in 1867. A son, Francis Boileau, was born in 1871.

He was a created a baronet on 9 July 1845 and appointed a Knight Commander of the Order of the Bath (KCB) on 12 June 1854. Having retired from government, Davis engaged in literary pursuits. In 1876, he became a Doctor of Civil Law of the University of Oxford after a donation of £1,666 in three per cent consol bonds to endow a scholarship in his name for the encouragement of the study of Chinese.

=== Death ===
Davis died on 13 November 1890 at his residence, Hollywood House in the Bristol suburb of Henbury, England at the age of 95 and was interred in the graveyard of Compton Greenfield Church on 18 November. As his surviving son Francis Boileau left no surviving male heirs, the Davis baronetcy died with him.

== Namesakes ==
- Mount Davis, Hong Kong
- Mount Davis Path, Hong Kong
- Mount Davis Road, Hong Kong
- Davis Street, Hong Kong

== Works ==
In 1829, Davis, a member of the Royal Asiatic Society, translated the 17th-century Chinese novel Haoqiu zhuan under the title The Fortunate Union. This was translated into French by Guillard D'Arcy in 1842.

Davis also wrote an account of the events surrounding the attack on his father's house in Benares, India, in Vizier Ali Khan or The Massacre of Benares, A Chapter in British Indian History, published in London in 1871.

Other works include:

- Translations from the Original Chinese, with Notes. Guangzhou: East Asia Co. Press. 1815., with Robert Morrison.
- Chinese Novels, Translated from the Originals, &c. London: John Murray. 1822..
- Hien Wun Shoo: Chinese Moral Maxims. London: John Murray. 1823..
- A Commercial Vocabulary, Containing Chinese Words and Phrases Peculiar to Canton and Macao and to the Trade of Those Places, Together with the Titles and Addresses of All the Officers of Government, Hong Merchants, &c. &c. Macao: East Asia Co. Press. 1824.
- "Eugraphia Sinensis, or, The Art of Writing the Chinese Character with Correctness". Transactions of the Royal Asiatic Society of Great Britain and Ireland. Vol. I. London: Royal Asiatic Society. 1827. pp. 304 ff.
- "Poeseos Sinensis Commentarii: On the Poetry of the Chinese". Transactions of the Royal Asiatic Society. Vol. II. London: Royal Asiatic Society. 1829.
- The Chinese: A General Description of the Empire of China and Its Inhabitants. London: Charles Knight. 1836.
  - Volume I
  - Volume II
- Sketches of China, Partly During an Inland Journey of Four Months between Peking, Nanking, and Canton. Vol. I & II. London: Charles Knight & Co. 1841.
- China, during the War and since the Peace. London: Longman, Brown, Green, & Longmans. 1852.
- Chinese Miscellanies. London: John Murray. 1865.

== See also ==
- History of Hong Kong

Baronetage of the United Kingdom
New title	Baronet (of Hollywood); 1845–1890	Succeeded by Francis Boileau Davis
