= Baillie baronets of Polkemmet (1823) =

The Baillie baronetcy, of Polkemmet in the County of Linlithgow, was created in the Baronetage of the United Kingdom on 14 November 1823 for William Baillie. He was the son of William Baillie, Lord Polkemmet, a Lord of Session. The family seat was Polkemmet House near Whitburn, West Lothian.

The 2nd Baronet sat as Conservative Member of Parliament for Linlithgowshire. He was childless and was succeeded by his nephew, the 3rd Baronet. He emigrated to Australia and was a justice of the peace for New South Wales and Victoria. He died at age 39 and was succeeded by his younger brother, the 4th Baronet. The 4th Baronet's sons succeeded him as the 5th Baronet and the 6th Baronet. The 5th Baronet was the first West Lothian casualty of the First World War. The 6th Baronet, was Conservative Member of Parliament for Linlithgowshire and Tonbridge. His wife was Olive, Lady Baillie.

The Baillie family are buried in the Baillie enclosure at Whitburn South Parish Churchyard. The Polkemmet Mausoleum memorialised the 4th, 5th and 6th Baronets. The Mausoleum was erected in 1915 by Lady Baillie of Polkemmet in the grounds of the Polkemmet Estate and is located within, but is not part of, what is now Polkemmet Country Park.

As of 2026 the title is held by the 8th Baronet, who succeeded his father in 2003.

== Baillie baronets, of Polkemmet (1823) ==
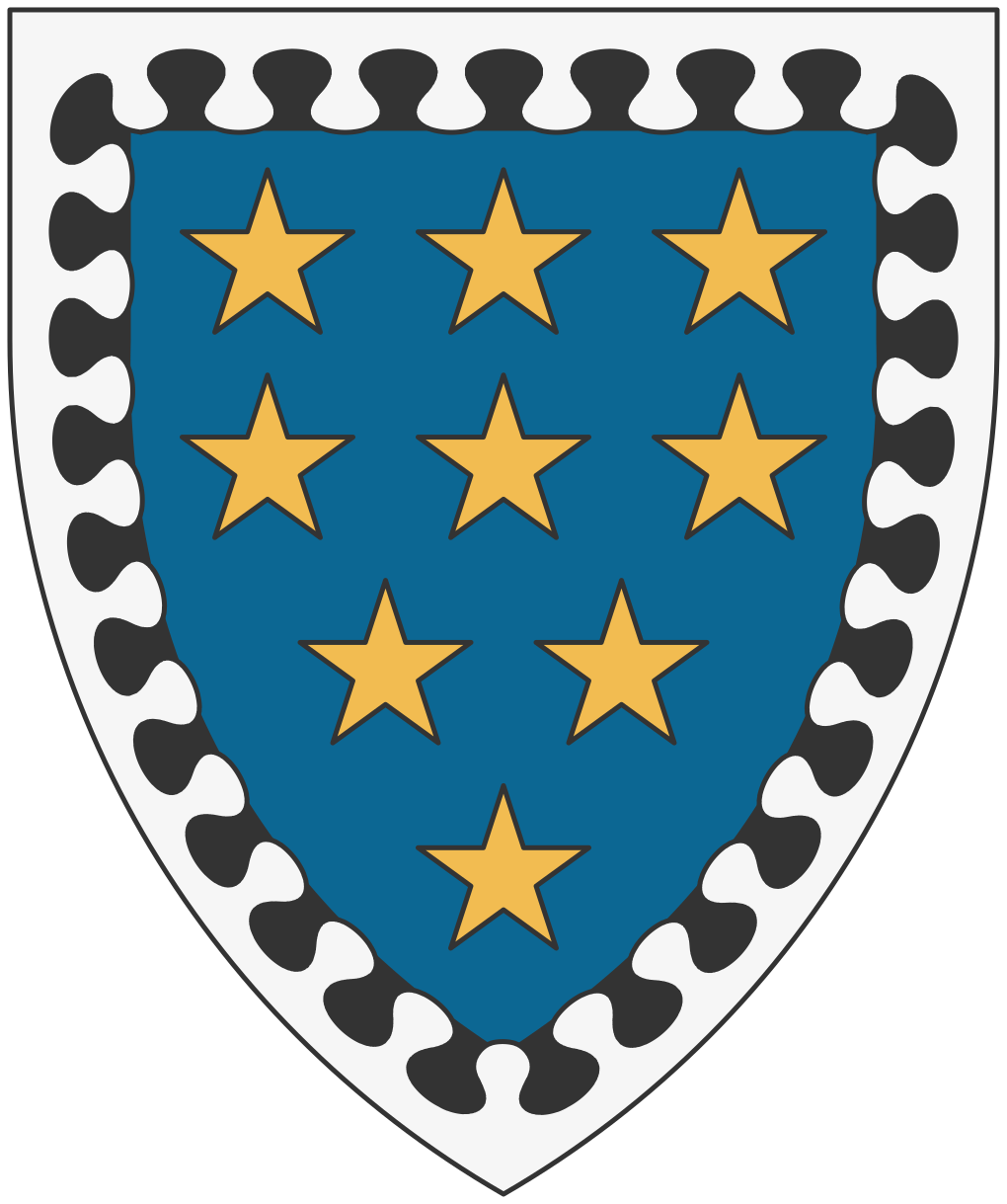
Arms of Baillie of Polkemmet

- Sir William Baillie, 1st Baronet (1784–1854)
- Sir William Baillie, 2nd Baronet (1816–1890)
- Sir George Baillie, 3rd Baronet (1856–1896)
- Sir Robert Alexander Baillie, 4th Baronet (1859–1907)
- Sir Gawaine George Stuart Baillie, 5th Baronet (1893–1914)
- Sir Adrian William Maxwell Baillie, 6th Baronet (1898–1947)
- Sir Gawaine George Hope Baillie, 7th Baronet (1934–2003)
- Sir Adrian Louis Baillie, 8th Baronet (b. 1973)

The heir to the title is Sebastian Gawaine Baillie.

== Notes ==
Baronetage of the United Kingdom
Preceded by Robinson baronets	Baillie baronets of Polkemmet; 14 November 1823	Succeeded by Ochterlony baronets
