= Sir George Robinson, 1st Baronet =

British politician and director (1758–1832)

Sir George Abercrombie Robinson, 1st Baronet (29 March 1758 – 13 February 1832) was a British politician and Chairman of the East India Company.

== Life ==
He was the son of John Robinson of Calcutta, who died at the Cape of Good Hope in 1779, and Margaret, daughter of George Leslie of Kimrawgie, North Britain. He joined the East India Company in 1779 as a cadet and was successively promoted to ensign, Commissary-General (1786), Aide-de-Camp to Lord Cornwallis (Governor-General of Bengal) (1788), Head Assistant in the Military Auditor-General's office (1788–92), Garrison Storekeeper at Fort William and Secretary to the Military Board, captain (1798) and Military Auditor-General (1798). He retired in 1802 and served as Private Secretary to Cornwallis from July to October, 1805.

Robinson became a director of the East India Company from 1808 to 1829, acting as chairman in 1820 and 1826. He was also a director of the Globe Insurance Company. He was elected as the MP for Honiton in 1812 (until 1818).

On 11 November 1823, Robinson was created the first Baronet of Batts House, Somerset . The title became extinct in 1944 on the death of Sir Douglas Robinson, 6th Baronet. He died on 13 February 1832 at his son William Scott Robinson's house in Dyrham, after a long illness. His wife Margaret predeceased him on 21 May 1824.

== Family ==
On 27 March 1794 Robinson married, in Calcutta, Margaret Southwell, the illegitimate daughter of Thomas Howard, 14th Earl of Suffolk, with whom he had seven sons and a daughter:

- George Best – died young
- Francis Matilda – died young
- Sir George Best Robinson, 2nd Baronet – became the second chief superintendent of British trade in China in 1835.
- Francis-Horsley
- The Rev. William Scott Robinson, Rector of Dyrham, Gloucestershire
- Charles Cornwallis – died young
- Henry Sterling
- Edward Innes

Parliament of the United Kingdom
Preceded by Augustus Cavendish-Bradshaw	Member of Parliament for Honiton; 1812–1818	Succeeded by Samuel Crawley
Political offices
Preceded by Campbell Marjoribanks	Chairman of the British East India Company; 1820	Succeeded by Thomas Reid
Preceded by Campbell Marjoribanks	Chairman of the British East India Company; 1826	Succeeded by Hon. Hugh Lindsay
Baronetage of the United Kingdom
New creation	Baronet (of Batts House); 1823–1832	Succeeded by George Robinson
