= Sir George Robinson, 2nd Baronet =

British colonial administrator

Sir George Best Robinson Bt.

Chief Superintendent of British Trade in China
- In office 19 January 1835 – 7 June 1836
- Preceded by: John Francis Davis
- Succeeded by: Charles Elliot

Personal details
- Born: 14 November 1797
- Died: 27 January 1855 (aged 57)
- Spouse: Louisa Douglas
- Profession: Diplomat, colonial administrator

Sir George Best Robinson, 2nd Baronet (14 November 1797 – 1855) was a British colonial administrator who became Chief Superintendent of British trade in China.

== Family background ==
Son of Sir George Robinson, 1st Baronet and Margaret Southwell, the natural daughter of Thomas Howard, 14th Earl of Suffolk, he succeeded to the baronetcy on 13 February 1832.

== Career ==
Between 1818-19 he was employed as a supercargo by the East India Company in Canton, (now known as Guangzhou).

He was appointed third Superintendent of British Trade in China alongside Lord Napier and John Francis Davis in December 1833. After Napier's death in 1834, Davis and Robinson moved up to become chief and second superintendents.

Robinson became Chief Superintendent on 19 January 1835 following the resignation of John Francis Davis with John Harvey Astell and Charles Elliot as second and third superintendents. He maintained a "perfectly quiescent line of policy" during his tenure and reported a "quiet and prosperous routine of trade". To maintain this state of affairs and to avoid the necessity of British ships obtaining port clearance in Macao, in November 1835, Robinson left the British Factory in Canton after announcing that he would henceforth operate from aboard the cutter Louisa moored off Lintin Island outside the Bocca Tigris. British Foreign Secretary Lord Palmerton effectively dismissed Robinson in line with "the intention of His Majesty’s Government to reduce the establishment in China" through a dispatch dated 7 June 1836, in which he wrote:

"It, therefore, now becomes my duty to acquaint you, that His Majesty’s Government have decided to abolish at once the office and salary of Chief Superintendent. In communicating to you this decision, I have at the same time to inform you, that your functions will cease from the date of the receipt of this despatch. You will make over. to Captain Elliot all the archives of the Commission; which will, of course, include copies of every despatch, and its inclosures (sic), which you have addressed to this department during the period you have acted as Chief Superintendent.

The Spectator later commented:

"The conclusion can hardly be resisted, that to get rid of Sir GEORGE ROBINSON, Lord PALMERSTON abolished the office, with the intention of restoring it for Captain ELLIOT'S benefit with the purpose of enabling British subjects to violate the laws of the country to which they trade. Any loss, therefore, which such persons may suffer in consequence of the more effectual execution of the Chinese laws on this subject, must be borne by the parties who have brought that loss on themselves by their own acts."

== Personal life ==
On 5 December 1825, Robinson married Louisa, youngest daughter of Major-Gen. Robert Douglas Diarist Harriet Low recorded on 5 April 1832 that Robinson and his wife: "are both six feet tall and no beauty to boast of; very well matched as regards intellect, and not at all troubled by the fashions of the world." The Morning Post reported that Louisa died in London on 9 August 1843. He was at that time resident at Furzebrook House in Axminster, Devon. On 7 January 1863 the couple's only daughter, Louisa, married John Prideaux Lightfoot, the Vice-Chancellor of Oxford University

Baronetage of the United Kingdom
Preceded by George Robinson	Baronet (of Batts House); 1832–1855	Succeeded by George Robinson
