= List of ship launches in 1883 =

The list of ship launches in 1883 includes a chronological list of some ships launched in 1883.

Date	Ship	Class / type	Builder	Location	Country	Notes
8 January	Dorothy	Fishing vessel	Messrs. Walker & Sons	Scarborough	United Kingdom	For H. Champion.
8 January	Goldenhorn	Merchantman	Messrs. Russell & Co.	Greenock	United Kingdom	For James R. de Wolf.
9 January	Kate	Fishing vessel	Messrs. Walker & Sons	Scarborough	United Kingdom	For Messrs. Crawford & Co.
9 January	Kingston	Steamship	Messrs. Richardson, Duck & Co.	South Stockton	United Kingdom	For Messrs. Henry Briggs & Co.
9 January	Linwood	Steamship	Messrs. C. S. Swan & Hunter	Wallsend	United Kingdom	For Messrs. Arthur Holland & Co.
9 January	Viking	Steamship	Messrs. Pearce Bros.	Dundee	United Kingdom	For Western and Brazilian Telegraph Company.
10 January	Adam	Steamship	Ljusne Mekaniska Verkstad	Ljusne	Sweden	For Mr. Kempe.
11 January	Ardgowan	Steamship	Messrs. Hanna, Donald & Wilson	Paisley	United Kingdom	For Ardgowan Steam Navigation Company (Limited).
11 January	Hawarden Castle	Steamship	Messrs. John Elder & Co.	Glasgow	United Kingdom	For Castle Line.
11 January	Ionic	Cargo liner	Harland & Wolff	Belfast	United Kingdom	For White Star Line
11 January	Maroon	Steamship	Messrs. Edward Finch & Co. (Limited)	Chepstow	United Kingdom	For Messrs. C. O. Young & Christies.
11 January	Olivia	Steamship	Messrs. Mordey & Carney	Newport	United Kingdom	For John Fry.
11 January	Saxmundham	Steamship	North of England Shipbuilding Company (Limited)	Sunderland	United Kingdom	For Hunting & Pattison.
12 January	George Lambe	Steamship	Messrs. Pearce Bros.	Dundee	United Kingdom	For W. P. Annear.
13 January	Prairie Flower	Tug	Messrs Cox and Co	Falmouth, Cornwall	United Kingdom	For Messrs. J. H. Dunn and Co.
15 January	Mascotte	Steamship	D. P. Garbutt	Hull	United Kingdom	For private owner.
19 January	Frejr	Steamship	Messrs. Lobnitz & Co.	Renfrew	United Kingdom	For Randers Dampskibs Selskab of 1866.
20 January	Gitano	Steamship	Earle's Shipbuilding	Hull	United Kingdom	For Messrs. Wilson's.
20 January	Opah	Steamship	Earle's Shipbuilding	Kingston upon Hull	United Kingdom	For Messrs. Massey & Sawyer.
20 January	Palermo	Steamship	Earle's Shipbuilding	Hull	United Kingdom	For Messrs. Wilson's.
20 January	Retford	Steamship	Earle's Shipbuilding	Hull	United Kingdom	For Manchester, Sheffield and Lincolnshire Railway.
22 January	Shandon	Merchantman	Messrs. Robert Duncan & Co.	Port Glasgow	United Kingdom	For Messrs. Thom & Cameron.
23 January	Buninyong	Steamship	Messrs. Caird, Purdie & Co.	Barrow-in-Furness	United Kingdom	For Messrs. W. Howard Smith & Sons.
23 January	Energia	Steamship	Tyne Iron Shipbuilding Company	Willington Quay	United Kingdom	For private owner.
23 January	Gwendoline	Steamship	Messrs. Turnbull & Son	Whitby	United Kingdom	For Messrs. Turbull Bros.
23 January	Moruca	Steamship	Messrs. James & George Thompson	Clydebank	United Kingdom	For Messrs. David Caw & Co.
23 January	Primate	Steamship	Messrs. Raylton Dixon & Co.	Middlesbrough	United Kingdom	For Messrs. Edward Harris & Co.
24 January	Aquitaine	Steamship	John Blumer & Co.	Sunderland	United Kingdom	For Delmas Frères. Ran into quayside on being launched and was damaged at the stern.
24 January	Procida	Steamship	Messrs. Alexander Stephen & Sons	Linthouse	United Kingdom	For Messrs. Robert M. Sloman & Co.
25 January	Accomac	Steamship	Messrs. M. Pearse & Co	Stockton-on-Tees	United Kingdom	For Messrs. W. Tapscott & Co.
25 January	Cleddy	Steamship	Joseph L. Thompson & Sons	Sunderland	United Kingdom	For John Marychurch & Co.
25 January	Hilda	Smack	Whitby & Robin Hood's Shipbuilding and Graving Company	Whitby	United Kingdom	For private owner.
25 January	Regal	Steamship	Messrs. Campbell, Mackintosh & Bowstead	Scotswood	United Kingdom	For Messrs. R. Conaway & Co.
25 January	Sara	Steamship	Messrs. Edward Withy & Co.	Middleton	United Kingdom	For Messrs. Joseph F. Cohen & Co.
25 January	Tartar	Steamship	Messrs. Aitken & Mansel	Whiteinch	United Kingdom	For Union Steamship Company.
27 January	Iona	Paddle steamer		Penarth	United Kingdom	For Cardiff and Penarth Steam Ferry Company (Limited).
27 January	Wellington	Steamship	Sir W. G. Armstrong, Mitchell & Co.	Low Walker	United Kingdom	For Sir Robert Dunsmuir & W. N. Diggle.
30 January	Kingswear	Steamship	Campbeltown Shipbuilding Company	Campbeltown	United Kingdom	For Haytor Mining Company.
January	Briton	Coaster	W. Allsup & Sons	Preston	United Kingdom	For Briton Steamship Co. Ltd.
5 February	Saint Joseph	Steamship	Kish, Boolds & Co	Sunderland	United Kingdom	For MM. Dussarget, Bonnin & Badille.
6 February	Edith	Steamship	Messrs. Harkness & Son	Middlesbrough	United Kingdom	For W. Harkness.
6 February	Micronesia	Merchantman	Messrs. Russel & Co.	Greenock	United Kingdom	For Messrs. D. & W. Goff.
6 February	Teelin Head	Steamship	Messrs. Workman, Clark & Co.	Belfast	United Kingdom	For Ulster Steamship Company (Limited).
7 February	Mistletoe	Albacore-class gunboat	Messrs. Laird Bros.	Birkenhead	United Kingdom	For Royal Navy.
7 February	Thistle	Steamship	Messrs. Pearce Bros.	Dundee	United Kingdom	For Baillie Taylor.
8 February	Ackworth	Steamship	W. Gray & Co.	West Hartlepool	United Kingdom	For Messrs. Joseph Merryweather & Co.
8 February	Hartside	Steamship	D. Baxter & Co.	Monkwearmouth	United Kingdom	ForCharlton, McAllum & Co.
8 February	La Plata	Schooner	Messrs. J. M'Arthur & Co.	Paisley	United Kingdom	For C. T. Getting.
8 February	Pione	Steamship	Short Bros.	Pallion	United Kingdom	For J. Sinclair.
8 February	Tourmaline	Steamship	Messrs. Richardson, Duck & Co.	South Stockton	United Kingdom	For Messrs. C. O. Young & Christies.
8 February	Wanderer	Gunboat	Messrs. Raylton Dixon & Co.	Middlesbrough	United Kingdom	For Royal Navy.
9 February	Crown of England	Merchantman	Messrs. R. Williamson & Son	Workington	United Kingdom	For Messrs. Robertson. Cruickshank & Co.
9 February	Glengarry	Steamship	London & Glasgow Engineering & Iron Shipbuilding Company	Govan	United Kingdom	For Glen Line.
9 February	Peveril	Steamship	Messrs. Gourlay Bros. & Co.	Dundee	United Kingdom	For Messrs. Williamson, Milligan & Co.
10 February	Aberdour	Steamship	Messrs. Alexander Hall & Co.	Footdee	United Kingdom	For Messrs. Adam & Co.
10 February	Deeside	Steamship	Messrs. Alexander Hall & Co.	Footdee	United Kingdom	For Messrs. Mennie & Brown and George MacBain.
10 February	Elbe	Steamship	Messrs. Dobie & Co.	Govan	United Kingdom	For Messrs Coverlay & Westray.
10 February	Erato	Steamship	William Gray & Co.	West Hartlepool	United Kingdom	For Messrs. Gladstone & Cornforth.
10 February	George Roper	Barque	W. H. Potter & Sons	Liverpool	United Kingdom	For W. T. Dickson & Son. Collided with the steamship Bentinck on being launched. Both vessels were severely damaged.
10 February	La Nevera	Cargo ship	Harland & Wolff	Belfast	United Kingdom	For River Plate Co.
10 February	South Wales	Steamship	Messrs. Schlesinger, Davis & Co.	Wallsend	United Kingdom	For Messrs. Evan Jones & Co.
10 February	Yorouba	Steamship	Barrow Ship Building Co. Ltd.	Barrow-in-Furness	United Kingdom	For MM. Verminck et Cie., or Compagnie du Senegal et de la Côte Occidental d'Afrique.
12 February	Cavalier	Steamship	Messrs. Aitken & Mansel	Kelvinhaugh	United Kingdom	For David MacBrayne.
13 February	Felix Depeaux	Steamship	Messrs. H. M'Intyre & Co.	Merksworth	United Kingdom	For Felix Depeaux.
14 February	Para	Paddle steamer	Messrs. Blackwood & Gordon	Port Glasgow	United Kingdom	For Amazon Steam Navigation Company (Limited).
20 February	Coblenz	Steamship	Messrs. R. Steel & Co.	Greenock	United Kingdom	For Messrs. James Currie & Co.
20 February	Heathmore	Steamship	Messrs. J. Key & Son	Kirkcaldy	United Kingdom	For private owner.
20 February	Pelion	Steamship	Messrs. A. M'Millan & Sons	Dumbarton	United Kingdom	For Compagnie Fraissinet.
21 February	Unnamed	Steamship	Messrs. David J. Dunlop & Co.	Port Glasgow	United Kingdom	For Société Postale Française. Subsequently named Pomona.
22 February	Buccleuch	Steam trawler	Messrs Hawthorn & Co.	Leith	United Kingdom	For General Steam Fishing Company.
22 February	Phra Chula Chom Klao	Steamship	Messrs. Caird & Co.	Greenock	United Kingdom	For J. J. Sinclair.
22 February	Slieve Donard	East Indiaman	Messrs. John Reid & Co.	Port Glasgow	United Kingdom	For W. P. Sinclair & Co.
23 February	Amethyst	Steamship	Messrs. John Fullerton & Co.	Merksworth	United Kingdom	For William Robertson.
23 February	Iona	Steamship	Messrs. James & George Thompson	Clydebank	United Kingdom	For London and Edinburgh Shipping Co.
23 February	Mount Carmel	Full-rigged ship	Messrs. Ramage & Ferguson	Leith	United Kingdom	For Messrs. Smith & Service.
23 February	Scindia	Steamship	Messrs. D. & W. Henderson & Co.	Partick	United Kingdom	For Anchor Line.
24 February	Aboraca	Steamship	Short Bros.	Sunderland	United Kingdom	For Graham, Anderson & Co.
24 February	Berenicia	Steamship	Palmer's Shipbuilding and Iron Co.	Jarrow	United Kingdom	For Messrs. J. E. Bowser, Ormston & Co. and Partners.
24 February	Kong Beng	Steamship	Messrs. John Elder & Co.	Fairfield	United Kingdom	For Scottish Oriental Steamship Company (Limited).
24 February	Letimbro	Steamship	Messrs. Blackwood & Gordon	Port Glasgow	United Kingdom	For Società Italiana di Transporti Marittimi Raggio & Co.
24 February	Tynemouth	Steamship	Messrs. Robert Thompson & Sons	Southwick	United Kingdom	For T. H. Dawson.
26 February	Norham Castle	Passenger ship	John Elder & Co.	Glasgow	United Kingdom	For Castle Line
27 February	Phaeton	Leander-class cruiser	Messrs. Napier, Shanks & Bell	Yoker	United Kingdom	For Royal Navy.
28 February	Hodgson	Steamship	Messrs. R. & J. Evans & Co.	Liverpool	United Kingdom	For Mersey Docks and Harbour Board.
February	Arakan	Steam launch	Messrs. T. B. Seath & Co	Rutherglen	United Kingdom	For private owner.
February	John Readhead	Steamship	Messrs. John Readhead & Co.	South Shields	United Kingdom	For Messrs. Franz Rahtkens & Co.
February	Knight of St. Michael	East Indiaman	W. B. Thompson	Whiteinch	United Kingdom	For Messrs. Greenshields, Currie & Co.
February	Malta	Steamship	Edward Wales	Hull	United Kingdom	For William Watkins Ltd.
6 March	Norwich	Steamship	Earle's Shipbuilding	Hull	United Kingdom	For Great Eastern Railway.
7 March	Lincoln	Steamship	Earle's Shipbuilding	Hull	United Kingdom	For Great Eastern Railway.
7 March	Royalist	Satellite-class sloop		Devonport Dockyard	United Kingdom	For Royal Navy.
8 March	Abraham Sutton	Steamship	Messrs. Pearce Bros.	Dundee	United Kingdom	For Mr. Sutton.
9 March	M. E. Watson	Merchantman	Messrs. Richardson, Duck & Co.	Stockton-on-Tees	United Kingdom	For Messrs. Chadwick & Prichard.
9 March	Torpilleur N° 63	33-metre type, 1st series (1880 & 1881 tranche) torpedo boat	Chantiers et Ateliers Augustin Normand	Le Havre	France	For French Navy
10 March	Albion	Steamship	Messrs. Dobson & Charles	Grangemouth	United Kingdom	For Albion Steam Shipping Company.
10 March	Bonnington	Steamship	Messrs. R. Duncan & Co.	Port Glasgow	United Kingdom	For Bonnington Steamship Co.
10 March	Doric	Ocean liner	Harland & Wolff	Belfast	United Kingdom	For White Star Line
10 March	Kent	Steamship	London and Glasgow Engineering and Iron Shipbuilding Co.	Govan	United Kingdom	For Wigram Line.
10 March	Kow Shing	Steamship	Barrow Ship Building Co. Ltd.	Barrow-in-Furness	United Kingdom	For Indo-China Steam Navigation Company Ltd.
10 March	Lord Morton	Paddle steamer	Messrs. S. & H. Morton & Co.	Leith	United Kingdom	For M. P. Galloway.
10 March	Pennon	Steamship	Messrs. T. B. Seath & Co.	Rutherglen	United Kingdom	For Messrs. J. Reston & Co.
10 March	St. Finbar	Steamship	Messrs. Dobie & Co.	Govan	United Kingdom	For City of Cork Steam Packet Company (Limited).
12 March	Abana	Steamship	Messrs. M.Pearse & Co.	Stockton-on-Tees	United Kingdom	For private owner.
12 March	Bass Rock	Steamship	D. P. Garbutt	Hull	United Kingdom	For D. P. Garbutt.
12 March	Clan Macarthur	Steamship	Messrs. Scott & Co.	Cartsdyke	United Kingdom	For Clan Line.
12 March	Jersey	Steamship	Messrs. Palmer & Co. (Limited)	Howden-on-Tyne	United Kingdom	For Messrs. Morel Bros. & Co.
12 March	Medina	Steamship	Cardiff Junction Dry Dock Engineering Company (Limited)	Cardiff	United Kingdom	For James Ware.
13 March	Humacao	Steamship	Messrs. Charles Connell & Co.	Scotstoun	United Kingdom	For Direct Line.
15 March	Argus	Steamship	Messrs. J. Fullarton & Co.	Merksworth	United Kingdom	For Hugh Keith.
15 March	Maripost	Cargo liner	William Cramp & Sons	Philadelphia, Pennsylvania	United States	For Oceanic Steamship Company.
15 March	Shalimar	Merchantman	Messrs. Russell & Co.	Port Glasgow	United Kingdom	For Messrs. W. & J. Crawford.
17 March	Lepanto	Italia-class ironclad	Cantiere navale fratelli Orlando	Livorno	Italy	For Regia Marina.
20 March	Irwin	Steamship	Kish, Boolds & Co.	Sunderland	United Kingdom	For Messrs. Thomas Pugsley & Co.
21 March	Rapid	Satellite-class sloop		Devonport Dockyard	United Kingdom	For Royal Navy. Ran into HMS Royal Adelaide on being launched and was damaged.
21 March	Spider	Steamship	Messrs. S. & H. Morton & Co.	Leith	United Kingdom	For Henry Martini.
22 March	Dingadee	Steamship		Passage West	United Kingdom	For Australian Steam Navigation Company.
24 March	Apolo	Paddle steamer	Messrs. William Denny & Bros.	Dumbarton	United Kingdom	For La Platinée Compagnie.
24 March	Cancer	Steam trawler	Thomas Charlton	Grimsby	United Kingdom	For Grimsby Steam Trawl Fishing Company (Limited).
24 March	Eeta	Steamship	Messrs. Wigham, Richardson & Co	Low Walker	United Kingdom	For Demerara and Berbice Steamship Company.
24 March	Elmfield	Steamship	Messrs. Richardson, Duck & Co.	Stockton-on-Tees	United Kingdom	For Messrs. F. Binnington & Co.
24 March	Machin	Steamship	Messrs. Raylton Dixon & Co.	Stockton-on-Tees	United Kingdom	For private owners.
24 March	Sirio	Steamship	Messrs. R. Napier & Sons	Govan	United Kingdom	For Società Italiana di Transporti Marittimi Raggio & Co.
24 March	Tasmania	Steamship	Edward Wales	Hull	United Kingdom	For William Watkins Ltd.
24 March	Terror	Amphitrite-class monitor	William Cramp & Sons	Philadelphia, Pennsylvania	United States	For United States Navy.
24 March	Wexford	Steamship	William Doxford & Sons	Sunderland	United Kingdom	For R. M. Hudson & Son.
27 March	Don Isabel	Paddle steamer	Messrs. Blackwood & Gordon	Port Glasgow	United Kingdom	For Amazon Steam Navigation Company.
28 March	Crocodile	Dredger	Messrs. W. Simons & Co.	Renfrew	United Kingdom	For Melbourne Harbour Commissioners.
29 March	Mundurucus	Steamship	Messrs. Aitken & Mansel	Whiteinch	United Kingdom	For Messrs. Bisseau & Mitchell.
6 April	Lili	Steam yacht	W. Allsup & Sons	Preston	United Kingdom	For Lucien Glassier.
7 April	Defiance	Paddle tug	W. Allsup & Sons	Preston	United Kingdom	For London Docks Company.
7 April	Héron	Héron-class wheeled aviso	Chantier naval Claparède et Cie	Rouen, Le Petit-Quevilly	France	For French Navy
7 April	Ville de Victoria	Ocean liner	Ateliers et Chantiers de la Loire	Nantes	France	For Soc. des Chargeurs Réunis
7 April	Kirtle	Steamship	Messrs. Edward Withy & Co.	West Hartlepool	United Kingdom	For George Steel.
7 April	Marjorie	Yacht	Messrs. Robert Steele & Co.	Greenock	United Kingdom	For James Coats Jr.
7 April	W. S. Caine	Steamship	W. Thomas	Amlwch	United Kingdom	For private owner.
8 April	Atalanta	Steam yacht		Philadelphia, Pennsylvania	United States	For Jay Gould.
9 April	Bernina	Steamship	Messrs. R. & J. Evans	Liverpool	United Kingdom	For Messrs. Richards, Mills & Co.
9 April	Cybele	Steamship	Messrs. M. Pearse & Co.	Stockton-on-Tees	United Kingdom	For H. Cloake.
9 April	Villalta	Barque	Messrs. John Reid & Co	Port Glasgow	United Kingdom	For Messrs. Nicholsons & McGill.
10 April	Claymore	Steamship	Messrs. David & William Henderson & Co.	Partick	United Kingdom	For Claymore Shipping Co.
10 April	Torpilleur N° 64	33-metre type, 1st series (1880 & 1881 tranche) torpedo boat	Chantiers et Ateliers Augustin Normand	Le Havre	France	For French Navy
10 April	Cyrus	Steamship	Messrs. Dobson & Charles	Grangemouth	United Kingdom	For Thomas Risk.
10 April	Kingscote	Steamship	Robert Thompson & Sons	Sunderland	United Kingdom	For E. Eccles.
10 April	Stockbridge	Merchantman	Messrs. William Hamilton & Co.	Port Glasgow	United Kingdom	For Messrs. E. B. Hatfield & Co.
11 April	Actif	Steamship	Messrs. Alexander Hall & Co.	Footdee	United Kingdom	For Mons. J. Lamy Fils.
11 April	Fingal	Sailing ship	Harland & Wolff	Belfast	United Kingdom	For R. Martin & Co.
12 April	Caridad	Steamship	Messrs. A. M'Milland & Son	Dumbarton	United Kingdom	For Marquês de Campo.
12 April	Falls of Foyers	Merchantman	Messrs. Russell & Co.	Greenock	United Kingdom	For Messrs. Wright & Brackenridge.
14 April	City of Manchester	Steamship	Sunderland Shipbuilding Company, Limited	Sunderland	United Kingdom	For J. Gray & Co., or Messrs. Nelson, Donkin & Co.
19 April	Bolama	Steamship	Messrs. Earle's	Hull	United Kingdom	For Empreza Nacional de Navegação.
21 April	Acuba	Steamship	Short Bros.	Pallion	United Kingdom	For T. Stockdale, or Messrs. Coates, Stockdale & Co.
21 April	Batley	Steamship	Campbeltown Shipbuilding Company	Campbeltown	United Kingdom	For Messrs. J. T. & J. Taylor.
21 April	Koldinghuus	Paddle steamer	Messrs. Lobnitz & Co.	Renfrew	United Kingdom	For Det Forenede Dampskibs Selskab.
21 April	Whinfield	Steamship	Tyne Iron Shipbuilding Comopany, Limited	Howdon	United Kingdom	For Messrs. Sutton & Co.
21 April	Woodlands	Steamship	D. Baxter & Co.	Monkwearmouth	United Kingdom	For J. Frank, or Messrs. Groves, Fenwick & Co.
23 April	Dragonfly	Steamship	William Gray & Company	West Hartlepool	United Kingdom	For Galbraith, Pembroke & Co., or A. Bunting.
23 April	Eleanore	Steamship	Messrs. J. M'Arthur & Co.	Abbbotsinch	United Kingdom	For Messrs. M'Kinney & Rafferty.
23 April	Southgate	Steamship	Messrs. Turnbull & Son	Whitby	United Kingdom	For Messrs. Turnbull, Scott & Co.
24 April	Gulf of Mexico	Steamship	Messrs. Raylton Dixon & Co.	Middlesbrough	United Kingdom	For Greenock Steamship Co.
24 April	Roslin Castle	Steamship	Messrs. Barclay, Curle & Co.	Whiteinch	United Kingdom	For Castle Line.
24 April	Wetherby	Steamship	Messrs. William Gray & Co.	West Hartlepool	United Kingdom	For Messrs. C. Furness & Co.
25 April	Eden Hall	Steamship	Messrs. Gourlay Bros.	Dundee	United Kingdom	For Hall Line.
25 April	Eulydia	Yacht	Messrs. Fyfe	Fairlie	United Kingdom	For Mr. Corry.
25 April	Pontypridd	Steamship	Blyth Shipbuilding Co. Ltd	Blyth	United Kingdom	For Pontypridd Steamship Co. Ltd.
26 April	Moldavia	Steamship	Messrs. Richardson, Duck & Co.	Stockton-on-Tees	United Kingdom	For private owner.
26 April	Trefusis	Steamship	Messrs. W. Harkness & Son	Middlesbrough	United Kingdom	For Messrs. J. M. Lennard & Son.
27 April	Abermeed	Steamship	Palmer's Shipbuilding and Iron Company	Jarrow	United Kingdom	For Messrs. Letricheux & David.
28 April	Italia	Steamship	Black & Drury	Deptford	United Kingdom	For Compagnia Portugueza de Navegacao a Vapor Uniao.
28 April	Polyhymna	Steamship		Hamburg	Germany	For China Line. Collided with the Brazilian steamship Buenos Ayres on being launched. Both vessels were severely damaged.
28 April	Valetta	Steamship	Messrs. Charles Hill & Son	Bristol	United Kingdom	For Messrs. Cuthbert, Haddock & Co.
April	Ballarena	Steamship	Messrs. Henry Murray & Co.	Dumbarton	United Kingdom	For Messrs. Bell Bros. & McLelland.
April	Banca	Barque	Messrs. Russell & Co.	Kingston	United Kingdom	For Messrs. Peter Denniston & Sons.
April	Craigmont	Steamship	Messrs. H. M'Intyre & Co.	Paisley	United Kingdom	For Messrs. Walker, Donald & Co.
April	Carmen	Steamship	Messrs. H. M'Intyre & Co.	Paisley	United Kingdom	For Messrs. Pile & Co.
April	Falconhurst	East Indiaman	Messrs. J. M'Arthur & Co	Paisley	United Kingdom	For Messrs. William R. Price & Co.
April	Héron	Héron-class Wheeled aviso	Chantier naval Claparède et Cie	Petit-Quevilly	France	For French Navy
April	Hopper Barge No. 2	Steam hopper barge	Messrs. Murdoch & Murray	Port Glasgow	United Kingdom	For Hull Dock Co.
April	J. T. North	Barque	Messrs. Russell & Co.	Port Glasgow	United Kingdom	For Messrs. W. & J. Lockett.#
April	Laichiow	Steamship	Messrs. John Elder & Co.	Govan	United Kingdom	For Scottish Oriental Steamship Company.
April	Lizzie	Steamship	Messrs. T. B. Seath & Co.	Rutherglen	United Kingdom	For Nobel's Explosive Company (Limited).
April	Meg Merillees	Paddle steamer	Messrs. Barclay, Curle & Co.	Whiteinch	United Kingdom	For North British Steam Packet Company.
April	Nowsherra	Steamship	Messrs. William Denny & Bros.	Dumbarton	United Kingdom	For British India Steam Navigation Company.
April	Penarth	Steamship	Palmer's Shipbuilding Co		United Kingdom	For private owner.
April	Prinses Wilhelmina	Paddle steamer	Messrs. John Elder & Co.	Govan	United Kingdom	For Zeelandsche Stoomboot Maatschappij.
April	Rio Parana	Steamship	Messrs. Caird & Co.	Greenock	United Kingdom	For National Brazilian Steam Navigation Company.
April	Strathtay	Steamship	Messrs. Scott & Co.	Bowling	United Kingdom	For Messrs. James Hayy & Sons.
4 May	The Bexter	Humber Keel	William Rider	Leeds	United Kingdom	For Leeds Industrial Co-operative Society.
5 May	G. W. Jones	Steamship	John Blumer & Co	Sunderland	United Kingdom	For S.S. G. W. Jones Co. Ltd., or Messrs. Charles Jones & Co.
7 May	Nive	Nive-class transport ship	Forges et Chantiers de la Méditerranée	Le Havre	France	For French Navy.
7 May	Bell Rock	Steamship	D. P. Garbutt	Hull	United Kingdom	For private owner.
7 May	Gledholt	Steamship	Messrs. Edward Withy & Co.	West Hartlepool	United Kingdom	For Messrs. R. Ropner & Co.
7 May	Sargasso	Steamship	Messrs. J. & G. Thomson	Clydebank	United Kingdom	For Messrs. Scrutton, Sons & Co., Messrs. Stovell & Brown, Messrs. Henry Langridge & Co., and Messrs. David Caw & Co.
8 May	Conservative	Fishing smack	Messrs. W. & J. McCann	Hull	United Kingdom	For John Haldane.
8 May	Cremona	Steamship	Messrs. R. Steele & Co.	Greenock	United Kingdom	For Messrs. James Currie & Co.
8 May	Cymro	Steamship	Messrs. Alexander Stephen & Sons	Linthouse	United Kingdom	For Messrs. Tellefsen, Wills & Co.
8 May	Euripides	Steamship	Caird & Purdie	Barrow-in-Furness	United Kingdom	For Messrs. Layburn & Legge.
8 May	Midas	Steamship	Messrs. T. & W. Smith	North Shields	United Kingdom	For Messrs. Hall Bros.
8 May	Monarch	Steam yacht	Barrow Ship Building Co. Ltd.	Barrow-in-Furness	United Kingdom	For private owner.
8 May	Sarsuti	Brig	Messrs. Napier, Shanks & Bell	Yoker	United Kingdom	For Secretary of State for India.
8 May	St. Kilda	Steamship	Abercorn Shipbuilding	Paisley	United Kingdom	For Messrs. Muir & Houston.
8 May	Strathalder	Steamship	Messrs. John Fullerton & Co.	Merksworth	United Kingdom	For Messrs. James Hay & Sons.
9 May	Gannet	Fishing trawler	Messrs. D. Allen & Co.	Granton	United Kingdom	For private owner.
9 May	Llangorse	Steamship	Messrs. Schlesinger, Davis & Co.	Wallsend	United Kingdom	For C. E. Stallybrass.
9 May	Lord Warwick	Steamship	Tyne Iron Shipbuilding Co.	Willington	United Kingdom	For private owner.
10 May	Lady Torfrida	Steam yacht	Messrs. J. Elder & Co.	Fairfield	United Kingdom	For Willia Pearce.
10 May	Princess	Steamship	Short Bros.	Sunderland	United Kingdom	For Taylor & Sanderson.
10 May	Sunrise	Steamship	Messrs. R. Craggs & Sons	Middlesbrough	United Kingdom	For John Hood.
10 May	Mésange	Mésange-class wheeled aviso	Arsenal de Cherbourg	Cherbourg	France	For French Navy
10 May	Wendur	Yacht	Messrs. D. & W. Henderson	Partick	United Kingdom	For John Clark.
19 May	King Massaba	Steamship	Messrs. David J. Dunlop & Co.	Port Glasgow	United Kingdom	For National African Company (Limited).
19 May	Tenterden	Steamship	Messrs. Campbell, Mackintosh & Bowstead	Scotswood-on-Tyne	United Kingdom	For Messrs. A. L. Elder & Co.
19 May	Unnamed	Steam hopper barge	Messrs. Schlesinger, Davis & Co.	Wallsend	United Kingdom	For Tyne Commissioners.
21 May	Ipswich	Steamship	Earle's Shipbuilding	Kingston upon Hull	United Kingdom	For Great Eastern Railway.
21 May	Koranui	Steamship	Messrs. H. M'Intyre & Sons	Paisley	United Kingdom	For W. R. Williams.
22 May	Castleford	Steamship	Sunderland Shipbuilding Company, Limited	Sunderland	United Kingdom	For Castleford Steamship Co. Ltd.
22 May	Inverleith	Steamship	Messrs. Richardson, Duck & Co.	South Stockton-on-Tees	United Kingdom	For Messrs. Gledhill & Dishart.
22 May	Waverley	Steamship	Messrs. J. M'Arthur & Co.	Abbotsinch	United Kingdom	For Messrs. William McLachlan & Co.
22 May	ΣΦΗΕ	Tug	Abercorn Shipbuilding	Paisley	United Kingdom	For private owner.
23 May	Britannia	Steamship	Messrs. M. Pearse & Co.	Stockton-on-Tees	United Kingdom	For Messrs. Ward & Holzapfel.
23 May	City of Chicago	Steamship	Messrs. Charles Connell & Co.	Whiteinch	United Kingdom	For Inman Line.
23 May	Dundee	Steamship	Messrs. Gourlay Brothers & Co.	Dundee	United Kingdom	For Dundee and London Shipping Company.
23 May	Sylvia	Steamship	Messrs. William Gray & Co.	West Hartlepool	United Kingdom	For Messrs. C. S. Todd & Co.
24 May	Blue Jacket	Steamship	Joseph L. Thompson & Sons	Sunderland	United Kingdom	For Blue Jacket Steamship Co. Ltd.
24 May	Fushun	Steamship	W. B. Thompson	Whiteinch	United Kingdom	For China Merchants Steam Navigation Company.
24 May	Mutin	Hareng-class fishery protection vessel	Chantiers et Ateliers Augustin Normand	Le Havre	France	For French Navy
24 May	Macassar	Steamship	Messrs. Raylton Dixon & Co.	Middlesbrough	United Kingdom	For Insulinde Stoomboot Maatschappij.
26 May	Auretta	Steamship	Palmer Shipbuilding and Iron Company (Limited)	Jarrow	United Kingdom	For Messrs. J. and R. Bovey.
26 May	Holyhead	Steamship	Messrs. R. Duncan & Company	Port Glasgow	United Kingdom	For London and North Western Railway.
26 May	Mary Lohden	Steamship	Messrs. R. Irvine & Co.	West Hartlepool	United Kingdom	For Messrs. J. Lohden & Co.
26 May	Minerva	Paddle steamer	Messrs. William Denny & Bros.	Dumbarton	United Kingdom	For Compagnie La Platense.
26 May	Trekieve	Steamship	Messrs. John Readhead & Co	South Shields	United Kingdom	For Messrs Edward Hain and Son.
26 May	W J Pirrie	Sailing ship	Harland & Wolff	Belfast	United Kingdom	For S. Lawther & Co.
29 May	Alacrity	Steamship	Castle Steel and Iron Company	Milford Haven	United Kingdom	For T. R. Thompson.
30 May	Newhaven	Steamship	Messrs. Workman, Clarke & Co.	Belfast	United Kingdom	For Messrs. Richard Mackie & Co.
31 May	Olivia	Steam yacht	Messrs. A. & J. Inglis	Pointhouse	United Kingdom	For John Inglis Jr.
May	Clan Macpherson	Steamship	Messrs. Napier, Shanks & Bell	Yoker	United Kingdom	For Clan Line.
May	Conquistador	Steamship	Messrs. H. Murray & Co.	Dumbarton	United Kingdom	For Messrs. M'Laren, Crum & Co.
May	Culzean Castle	Barquentine	Troon Shipbuilding Company	Troon	United Kingdom	For James Bell.
May	Entella	Steamship	Messrs. Blackwood & Gordon	Port Glasgow	United Kingdom	For Società Italiana di Transporti Marittimi Raggio & Co.
May	General Picton	Merchantman	Messrs. Russell & Co.	Kingston	United Kingdom	For Messrs. Lewis, Davis & Co.
May	Gympie	Steamship	Campbeltown Shipbuilding Company	Campbeltown	United Kingdom	For Queensland Steam Shipping Company (Limited).
May	Hals	Hopper dredger	Messrs. William Simons & Co.	Renfrew	United Kingdom	For private owner.
May	Lagos	Steamship	Messrs. D. J. Dunlop & Co.	Port Glasgow	United Kingdom	For British and African Steam Navigation Company.
May	Mobile Bay	Barque	Messrs. Russel & Co.	Greenock	United Kingdom	For Messrs. Hatfield, Cameron & Co.
May	Noddleburn	Barque	Messrs. Birrell, Stenhouse & Co.	Dumbarton	United Kingdom	For private owner.
May	Rowena	Steamship	Messrs. Dobie & Son	Govan	United Kingdom	For Messrs. George Hood & Co.
May	Talca	Steamship	London and Glasgow Engineering and Iron Shipbuilding Company	Govan	United Kingdom	For Messrs. Balfour, Williamson & Co.
May	Toward	Steamship	Messrs. Dobie & Son	Govan	United Kingdom	For Clyde Shipping Company.
4 June	Merrie England	Steam yacht	Messrs. Ramage & Fergusson	Leith	United Kingdom	For George F. Lees.
5 June	Alvarado	Steamship	Messrs. S. H. Morton & Co.	Leith	United Kingdom	For Messrs. Macandrew & Co.
5 June	Amiral Baudin	Amiral Baudin-class ironclad		Brest	France	For French Navy.
5 June	Baron Clyde	Steamship	Messrs. Turnbull & Son	Whitby	United Kingdom	For Hugh Hogarth.
5 June	Ferncliffe	Steamship	Messrs. William Hamilton & Co.	Port Glasgow	United Kingdom	For Messrs. John Melmore & Co.
5 June	Ghazee	Steamship	Messrs. Aitken & Mansel	Whiteinch	United Kingdom	For Messrs. Gellatly, Hankey, Sewell & Co.
5 June	Grabo	Steamship	Messrs. John Key & Sons	Kinghorn	United Kingdom	For Messrs. William Howard, Smith & Sons.
5 June	Guiseppino Bertollo	Merchantman	Messrs. A. M'Millan & Son	Dumbarton	United Kingdom	For Signor Bertollo.
5 June	Takapuna	Passenger ship	Barrow Ship Building Co. Ltd.	Barrow-in-Furness	United Kingdom	For Union Steamship Company of New Zealand Ltd.
6 June	Clan Macintosh	Steamship	Messrs. Scott & Co.	Cartsdyke	United Kingdom	For Clan Line.
6 June	Esmeralda	Cruiser	Armstrong Mitchell	Elswick	United Kingdom	For Chilean Navy.
6 June	Glenelg	Steamship	London and Glasgow Engineering and Iron Shipbuilding Company	Govan	United Kingdom	For Glen Line.
6 June	Goalpara	Steamship	Messrs. A. & J. Inglis	Pointhouse	United Kingdom	For British India Steam Navigation Company.
6 June	St. Rogavald	Steamship	Messrs. Hall, Russell & Co.	Aberdeen	United Kingdom	For North of Scotland Steam Navigation Co.
7 June	Amphitrite	Amphitrite-class monitor	Harlan and Hollingsworth	Wilmington, Delaware	United States	For United States Navy.
7 June	Cairngorm	Steamship	Messrs. Dobie & Co.	Govan	United Kingdom	For Messrs. R. & D. Cairns.
7 June	Calypso	Calypso-class corvette		Chatham Dockyard	United Kingdom	For Royal Navy.
7 June	Gulf of Venice	Steamship	Messrs. William Gray & Co.	West Hartlepool	United Kingdom	For Greenock Steamship Co.
7 June	Perfero	Steamship	Thomas Brassey	Birkenhead	United Kingdom	For King Line.
7 June	Radyr	Steamship	Messrs. E. Finch & Co., Limited	Chepstow	United Kingdom	For Messrs. John Cory & Sons.
7 June	Riachuelo	Ironclad	Samuda Brothers	Cubitt Town	United Kingdom	For Imperial Brazilian Navy.
7 June	Whitby Abbey	Steamship	Osbourne, Graham & Co.	Sunderland	United Kingdom	For Pyman, Watson & Co.
7 June	Will o' the Wisp	Sealer	Messrs. Alfred Simpson & Co.	Hull	United Kingdom	For private owner.
8 June	Aboukir Bay	Merchantman	Messrs. Russell & Co.	Greenock	United Kingdom	For Bay Line.
8 June	Agnes	Dredger	Messrs. William Simons & Co.	Renfrew	United Kingdom	For private owner.
9 June	Cairngowan	Steamship	S. P. Austin & Son	Sunderland	United Kingdom	For T. Cairns.
9 June	Clifton Grove	Steamship	Messrs. G. R. Stothert & Co.	Hotwells	United Kingdom	For Messrs. William Butler & Co.
9 June	Dromedary	Steamship	Messrs. Mordey & Carney	Newport	United Kingdom	For J. E. Scott.
9 June	Fawn	Steamship	Vulcan Iron Co.	Beverley	United Kingdom	For Messrs. Jackson Bros., & Co.
9 June	Saltburn	Merchantman	Short Bros.	Sunderland	United Kingdom	For J. S. Barwick.
9 June	Ville de Palerme	Steamship	Rpbert Thompson & Sons	Southwick	United Kingdom	For Compagnie Havraise Peninsulaire Navigation à Vapeur.
12 June	Torpilleur N° 61	33-metre type, 1st series (1880 & 1881 tranche) torpedo boat	Chantiers et Ateliers Augustin Normand	Le Havre	France	For French Navy
12 June	Rosebud	Steamship	Messrs. C. S. Swan & Hunter	Wallsend	United Kingdom	For Peter Rowe.
16 June	Jacuhype	Steamship	Messrs. Murdoch & Murray	Port Glasgow	United Kingdom	For Companhia Pernambuco del Navaigio Vapur.
19 June	Calabar	Steamship	Messrs. John Elder & Co.	Fairfield	United Kingdom	For British and African Steam Navigation Company.
19 June	Carlotta	Steamboat	A. G. Gifford	Acharn	United Kingdom	For Earl of Breadalbane and Holland.
19 June	Juane Nancy	Steamship	Messrs. Pearce Bros.	Dundee	United Kingdom	For Charles O. Fawcus.
10 June	Sindbad	Steamship	Messrs. Campbell, Mackintosh and Bowstead	Scotswood	United Kingdom	For Messrs. Sharp & Co.
20 June	Capercailzie	Steam yacht	Barclay, Curle, and Co.	Glasgow	United Kingdom	For George Burns.
20 June	Florence	Steam launch	The Floating Bridge Company	Gosport	United Kingdom	For private owners.
20 June	Imperial Marinheiro	Cruiser	Estabelecimento de Fundição e Estaleiros Ponta da Areia	Niterói	Brazil	For Imperial Brazilian Navy.
20 June	Indipendente	Steamship	Messrs. Alexander Stephen & Son	Linthouse	United Kingdom	For Navigazione Generale Italiano.
20 June	Isla	Steamship	Messrs. George Armitstead & Co.	Dundee	United Kingdom	For North Sea Steam Shipping Co.
20 June	Torreador	Steamship	Messrs. Burrell & Son	Dumbarton	United Kingdom	For private owner.
20 June	Trojan	Steamship	Messrs. Schlesinger, Davis & Co.	Wallsend	United Kingdom	For E. C. Thin.
21 June	Glassalt	Steamship	Messrs. Duthie, Sons, & Co.	Footdee	United Kingdom	For Aberdeen & Glasgow Steam Shipping Company.
21 June	Grace	Schooner	Messrs. William Bayley & Sons	Ipswich	United Kingdom	For Mr. Ball, George Carter, Henry Harrington and W. Lethbridge.
21 June	Hart Fell	Steamship	Messrs. Murdoch & Murray	Port Glasgow	United Kingdom	For Fell Line.
21 June	St. Kevin	Steamship	Messrs. M'Ilwaine, Lewis & Co.	Belfast	United Kingdom	For T. Heiton & Co.
22 June	Isly	Steamship	Messrs. Wigham, Richardson & Co.	Low Walker	United Kingdom	For private owner.
22 June	Orange Blossom	Herring boat	James Mowat	Gourdon	United Kingdom	For Messrs. Munro & Mowat.
22 June	Princess Helene	Paddle steamer	Messrs. Barclay, Curle & Co.	Whiteinch	United Kingdom	For Southampton, Isle of Wight, and South of England Royal Mail Steampacket Company.
22 June	Prior Hill	Barque	Messrs. Russell & Co.	Port Glasgow	United Kingdom	For Messrs. J. R. Dickson & Co.
22 June	Ragusa	Steamship	Tyne Iron Shipbuilding Company	Willington Quay	United Kingdom	For Messrs. Stephens & Mawson.
22 June	Sherbro' Monarch	Tug	Messrs. Hawthorns & Co.	Leith	United Kingdom	For private owners.
22 June	Sussex	Steamship	London and Glasgow Shipbuilding Co.	Glasgow	United Kingdom	For Messrs. Money, Wigram & Sons Ltd.
23 June	Annie	Steamship	Barrow Ship Building Co. Ltd.	Barrow-in-Furness	United Kingdom	For Steamship Annie Co. Ltd.
23 June	Jasper	Steamship	W. B. Thomson	Dundee	United Kingdom	For Gem Line.
23 June	Oregon	Ocean liner	John Elder & Company	Govan	United Kingdom	For Guion Line.
23 June	Niger	Cargo ship	Harland & Wolff	Belfast	United Kingdom	For African Steamship Co.
23 June	Oregon	Steamship	Messrs. John Elder & Co.	Govan	United Kingdom	For Guion Line.
23 June	Orione	Steamship	Messrs. R. Napier & Sons	Govan	United Kingdom	For Società Italiana di Transporti Marittimi Raggio & Co.
23 June	Raven	Steamship	Messrs. M. Pearse & Co.	Stockton-on-Tees	United Kingdom	For General Steam Navigation Company.
23 June	Savoia	Royal yacht		Castellamare di Stabia	Italy	For Umberto I.
25 June	Burnley	Steamship	Messrs. James & George Thomson	Clydebank	United Kingdom	For Messrs. David Caw & Co.
25 June	St. Thomé	Steamship	Earle's Shipbuilding	Hull	United Kingdom	For Empreza Nacional de Navegação.
25 June	Victoria	Gunboat	Sir William Armstrong, Mitchell & Co.	Newcastle upon Tyne	United Kingdom	For Victorian Naval Forces.
26 June	Devon	Steamship	D. Baxter & Co.	Sunderland	United Kingdom	For A. Wilmshurst, or Devon Steamship Company (Limited).
27 June	Gouvernor Generaal s'Jacob	Steamship	Messrs. Caird & Co.	Greenock	United Kingdom	For Nederlandsch Indiesche Stoomvaart Maatschappij.
27 June	Tortona	Steamship	Messrs. Robert Steele & Co.	Greenock	United Kingdom	For James Currie & Co.
30 Junr	Jane Clarke	Steamship	Messrs. Workman, Clarke & Co. (Limited)	Belfast	United Kingdom	For Messrs. Clarke & Service.
June	Admiral	Schooner	James Duncan	Kingston	United Kingdom	For private owner.
June	Dewdrop	Steam fishing smack			United Kingdom	For Messrs. James Crombie & Co.
June	Nant Gwynant	Steamship	Messrs. John Readhead & Sons	South Shields	United Kingdom	For Messrs. R. & D. Jones.
2 July	Warooka	Steamship	Messrs. M'Intyre & Co.	Paisley	United Kingdom	For Yorks National Steamship Company.
3 July	Daphne	Steamship	Alexander Stephen and Sons	Govan	United Kingdom	For Glasgow and Londonderry Steam Packet Company. Foundered on launch with the loss of more than 150 lives. Subsequently raised, repaired and entered service.
4 July	Gleaner	Schooner	Paul Rodgers	Carrickfergus	United Kingdom	For Messrs. Fisher & Co.
4 July	Kingsdale	Steamship	Short Bros.	Sunderland	United Kingdom	For Milburn Bros.
4 July	Goëland	Héron-class Wheeled aviso	Chantier naval Claparède et Cie	Saint-Denis	France	For French Navy
5 July	Argus	Steamship	Barrow Ship Building Co. Ltd.	Barrow-in-Furness	United Kingdom	For T. Kish & Co.
5 July	C. Birkbeck	Smack	Messrs. Cottingham Bros.	Goole	United Kingdom	For J. Simms.
5 July	Pateena	Steamship	Messrs. A. & J. Inglis	Pointhouse	United Kingdom	For Tasmanian Steam Navigation Co.
5 July	Plantagenet	Coaster	Messrs. W. Allsup & Sons	Preston	United Kingdom	For John Bacon.
5 July	Rivadavia	Paddle steamer	Messrs. Charles Connell & Co.	Scotstoun	United Kingdom	For private owner.
6 July	Stroma	Steamship	Messrs. Napier, Shanks & Bell	Yoker	United Kingdom	For Napier Shipping Company (Limited).
6 July	Wareatea	Steamship	Messrs. H. M'Intyre & Co.	Paisley	United Kingdom	For Westport Colliery Company.
7 July	Cuba	Steamship	Messrs. W. Gray & Co.	West Hartlepool	United Kingdom	For Messrs. D. & C. MacIver.
7 July	Pembroke Castle	Ocean liner	Barrow Ship Building Co. Ltd.	Barrow-in-Furness	United Kingdom	For D. Currie & Co.
7 July	Wingsang	Steamship	Messrs. Hall, Russell & Co.	Footdee	United Kingdom	For India and China Steam Navigation Company.
9 July	Persia	Steamship	Messrs. David & William Henderson & Co.	Meadowside	United Kingdom	For Anchor Line.
10 July	Dasher	Fishing smack	Messrs. J. Wray & Sons	Burton Stather	United Kingdom	For Mr. Robins.
12 July	Achille	Steamship	Messrs. Lobnitz & Co.	Renfrew	United Kingdom	For MM. A. Grandchamp, Fils & Cie.
12 July	Alberta	Steamship	Messrs. Charles Connell & Co.	Scotstoun	United Kingdom	For Canadian Pacific Railway.
18 July	Oasis	Steamship	Messrs. Scott & Co.	Greenock	United Kingdom	For Compagnie de Navigation Mixte.
18 July	Princessa Isabel	Steamship	Messrs. Blackwood & Gordon	Port Glasgow	United Kingdom	For Amazon Steam Navigation Company (Limited).
19 July	Samarang	Steamship	Messrs. Raylton Dixon & Co.	Middlesbrough	United Kingdom	For Koninklijke Rotterdamsche Lloyd.
20 July	Earl of Shaftesbury	Merchantman	Messrs. Ramage & Ferguson	Leith	United Kingdom	For Messrs. D. Brown & Sons.
21 July	Almsford	Steamship	Robert Thompson & Sons	Southwick	United Kingdom	For Thompson, Wrightson & Co.
21 July	Cogent	Steamship	Short Bros.	Sunderland	United Kingdom	For James Westoll.
21 July	Gorji	Steamship	Wigham, Richardson & Co.	Newcastle upon Tyne	United Kingdom	For Persian Gulf Steam Navigation Company.
21 July	Lord Wolseley	Sailing ship	Harland & Wolff	Belfast	United Kingdom	For Irish Shipowners Ltd.
21 July	Zephorus	Steamship	Messrs. Turnbull & Co.	Whitby	United Kingdom	For Turner, Brightman & Co.
23 July	Cavendish	Steamship	Messrs. Schlesinger, Davis & Co.	Wallsend	United Kingdom	For Messrs. Perry, Raines & Co.
23 July	Coventry	Steamship	Messrs. Edward Withy & Co,	West Hartlepool	United Kingdom	For Messrs. Sivewright, Bacon & Co.
23 July	Eros	Steamship	Messrs. Richardson, Duck & Co.	South Stockton	United Kingdom	For Messrs. Henry Briggs, Sons & Co.
23 July	Isle of Elba	Steamship	Messrs. T. & W. Smith	North Shields	United Kingdom	For Messrs. Dixon, Robson & Co.
23 July	Morso	Steamship	Messrs. H. M'Intyre & Co.	Merksworth	United Kingdom	For Messrs Joshua Gronsund & Co.
23 July	Wolf Rock	Steamship	D. P. Garbutt	Hull	United Kingdom	For private owner.
24 July	Cairngorm	Steamship	Messrs. A. M'Millan & Son	Dumbarton	United Kingdom	For Messrs. Robertson & Son.
24 July	Janus	Steamship	Messrs. Dobson & Charles	Grangemouthg	United Kingdom	For Thomas Kish.
24 July	Maitlands	Steamship	Messrs. William Gray & Co.	West Hartlepool	United Kingdom	For Messrs. Hardy, Wilson & Co.
30 July	Defender	Defender-class torpedo boat	John I. Thornycroft and Company	Chiswick	United Kingdom	For Royal Navy.
31 July	Algoma	Steamship	Aitken & Mansel	Glasgow	United Kingdom	For Canadian Pacific Railway.
July	Athalasca	Steamship	Messrs. Aitken & Mansel	Whiteinch	United Kingdom	For Canadian Pacific Railway.
July	Cairngorm	Steamship	Messrs. A. M'Millan & Sons	Dumbarton	United Kingdom	For Messrs. Robertson & Co.
July	Cam	Steamship	Messrs. J. M'Arthur & Co.	Abbotsinch	United Kingdom	For East Coast Steamship Company.
July	Finnella	Steam yacht	Messrs. A. & J. Inglis	Pointhouse	United Kingdom	For private owner.
July	Gladis	Steam yacht	Messrs. John Reid & Co.	Port Glasgow	United Kingdom	For Mr. Mathieson.
July	Gretna	Merchantman	Messrs. Robert Duncan & Co.	Port Glasgow	United Kingdom	For Messrs. Thomas Guthrie & Co.
July	Kincardineshire	Merchantman	Messrs. Russell & Co.	Greenock	United Kingdom	For Thomas Law & Co.
July	Kwang-lee	Steamship	W. B. Thompson	Whiteinch	United Kingdom	For China Merchants Steam Navigation Company.
July	Maggie	Barquentine	Troon Shipbuilding Co.	Troon	United Kingdom	For E. J. Duder.
July	Marshal Keith	Steamship		Dundee	United Kingdom	For private owner.
July	Nuddea	Steamship	Messrs. William Denny & Bros.	Dumbarton	United Kingdom	For British India Steam Navigation Company.
July	Strathpeffer	Steamship	Messrs. John Fullarton & Co.	Paisley	United Kingdom	For Messrs. James Hay & Sons.
July	Unnamed	Steamship	Messrs. Russell & Co.	Kingston	United Kingdom	For private owner.
2 August	Aurora	Steamship	Messrs. Raylton Dixon & Co.	Middlesbrough	United Kingdom	For Messrs. Ebdy, Blacklin & Co.
2 August	Dunbar Castle	Steamship	Barclay, Curle & Co.	Whiteinch	United Kingdom	For Castle Line.
2 August	Fiona	Steamship	Messrs. John Reid & Co.	Port Glasgow	United Kingdom	For Messrs. F. Parbury & Co.
3 August	Dartmouth	Steamship	Campbeltown Shipbuilding Company	Campbeltown	United Kingdom	For Haytor Mining Company.
4 August	Torpilleur N° 62	33-metre type, 1st series (1880 & 1881 tranche) torpedo boat	Chantiers et Ateliers Augustin Normand	Le Havre	France	For French Navy
4 August	Croma	Steamship	Joseph L. Thompson & Sons	Sunderland	United Kingdom	For Dent & Co., or Croma Shipping Co.
4 August	Dundela	Cargo ship	Harland & Wolff	Belfast	United Kingdom	For Harland & Wolff.
4 August	Fiona	Steam yacht	Messrs. Camper & Nicholson	Gosport	United Kingdom	For Emanuel Boutcher.
4 August	General Napier	Steamship	Blyth Shipbuilding Co. Ltd	Blyth	United Kingdom	For Barnes, Guthrie & Co.
4 August	Ida	Steamship	Messrs. Alexander Hall & Co.	Footdee	United Kingdom	For Messrs. Pyman, Bell & Co.
4 August	Moravia	Steamship	Messrs. A. & J. Inglis	Pointhouse	United Kingdom	For Hamburg-Amerikanische Packetfahrt-Aktien-Gesellschaft.
4 August	Westernland	Steamship	Messrs. Laird Bros.	Birkenhead	United Kingdom	For Société Anonyme de Navigation Belge Americane.
6 August	Avis	Steamship	Messrs. William Gray & Co.	West Hartlepool	United Kingdom	For Messrs. Brewis & Smith.
6 August	Lady Armstrong	Steamship	Sir W. G. Armstrong, Mitchell & Co.	Low Walker	United Kingdom	For Messrs. Adam, Hamilton & Co.
7 August	Maranoa	Steamship	Messrs. William Denny & Bros.	Dumbarton	United Kingdom	For Queensland Steamship Company (Limited).
7 August	Signal	Paddle steamer	Messrs. Caird & Co.	Greenock	United Kingdom	For Commissioners of Northern Lights.
8 August	Alaskan	Paddle steamer	Delaware River Iron Ship Building and Engine Works	Chester, Pennsylvania	United States	For Oregon Railway and Navigation Company.
8 August	Anne Thomas	Steamship	Messrs. Palmer's Shipbuilding and Iron Company (Limited)	Jarrow	United Kingdom	For Messrs. Evan Thomas, Radcliffe & Co.
8 August	Red Cross	Ambulance ship	Messrs. Edwards & Symes	Millwall	United Kingdom	For Metropolitan Asylums Board.
10 August	Taiaroa	Defender-class torpedo boat	John I. Thornycroft & Company	Chiswick	United Kingdom	For Royal Navy.
16 August	Churchill	Dredger	Messrs. Hall, Russell & Co.	Aberdeen	United Kingdom	For Natal Harbour Board.
18 August	Carriedo	Steamship	Messrs. Ramage & Ferguson	Leith	United Kingdom	For Messageries Maritimes.
18 August	Childers	Torpedo boat	John I. Thornycroft and Company	Chiswick	United Kingdom	For Victorian Naval Forces.
18 August	Claymore	Steamship	Joseph L. Thompson & Sons	Sunderland	United Kingdom	For J. H. Barry & Co.
18 August	Crown of Scotland	Merchantman	Messrs. T. B. Royden & Sons	Liverpool	United Kingdom	For Messrs. Robertson, Cruikshank & Co.
18 August	Gipsy	Steam trawler	Messrs. John Duthie, Sons & Co.	Aberdeen	United Kingdom	For William Leslie.
18 August	Tenryū	Corvette	Yokosuka Naval Arsenal	Yokosuka	Japan	For Imperial Japanese Navy.
18 August	Ardent	Mésange-class wheeled aviso	Chantiers et Ateliers Augustin Normand	Le Havre	France	For French Navy
18 August	North Star	Steam trawler	Messrs. John Duthie, Sons & Co.	Aberdeen	United Kingdom	For J. Pyper.
18 August	Vigo	Steamship	G. Davis	Abingdom	United Kingdom	For private owner.
18 August	Wylo	Steamship	Messrs. J. Readhead & Sons	South Shields	United Kingdom	For Wylo Steamship Company Limitey.
20 August	Clan Matheson	Steamship	Messrs. Napier, Shanks & Bell	Yoker	United Kingdom	For Clan Line.
20 August	J. C. Swindlehurst	Schooner	Messrs. Rawsthrone & Allison	Freckleton	United Kingdom	For J. Fairclough.
20 August	Neustria	Steamship	M. Chaparede	Rouen	France	For private owner.
21 August	Alberta	Steamship	Messrs. Richardson, Duck & Co.	South Stockton	United Kingdom	For Messrs. C. Young & Christies.
21 August	Ant	Steamship	Messrs. William Gray & Co.	West Hartlepool	United Kingdom	For Henry Martini.
21 August	Aspatria	Steamship	Messrs. M. Pearse & Co.	Stockton-on-Tees	United Kingdom	For F. Herskind.
21 August	Kennett	Steamship	Messrs. Edward Withy & Co.	Middleton	United Kingdom	For George Steel.
21 August	Monarch	Cable ship	David J. Dunlop & Co.	Glasgow	United Kingdom	For H.M. Postmaster General. First cable ship specifically designed for the Post Office.
21 August	Mount Edgcumbe	Steamship	Barrow Ship Building Co. Ltd.	Barrow-in-Furness	United Kingdom	For Mount Edgcumbe Steamship Co Ltd.
21 August	Olympian	Paddle steamer	Harlan and Hollingsworth	Wilmington, Delaware	United States	For Oregon Railway and Navigation Company.
21 August	Parthian	Steamship	Messrs. Murdoch & Murray	Port Glasgow	United Kingdom	For Messrs. J. & J. Macfarlane.
21 August	Phœbe Gertrude	Steamship	Usk Ship Building Company	Newport	United Kingdom	For Cornubia Company.
22 August	Meeinderry	Steamship	Messrs. T. B. Seath & Co.	Rutherglen	United Kingdom	For David Berry.
23 August	Elmhurst	Full-rigged ship	Messrs. Robert Duncan & Son	Port Glasgow	United Kingdom	For R. R. Paterson.
23 August	Falcon	Steamship	Kish, Boolds & Co	Pallion	United Kingdom	For Falcon Steamship Co. Limited.
23 August	Forrest Hall	Merchantman	Messrs. W. H. Potter & Co.	Liverpool	United Kingdom	For Messrs. Herron, Dunn & Co.
23 August	Lead On	Pilot cutter	Messrs. Davis and Plain	Cardiff	United Kingdom	For Zachariah White.
23 August	Morven	Steamship	Messrs. Dobie & Co.	Govan	United Kingdom	For Robert Thomson.
23 August	Owari Maru	Steamship	Messrs. Henry Murray & Co.	Dumbarton	United Kingdom	For Messrs. Raeburn & Verel, but sold to the Japan Steamship Company.
23 August	Tongeriro	Refrigerated cargo liner	Messrs. John Elder & Co.	Fairfield	United Kingdom	For New Zealand Shipping Company.
24 August	Adelaide	Steamship	Messrs. David & William Henderson & Co.	Meadowside	United Kingdom	For Adelaide Steamship Company (Limited).
25 August	Lady Margaret	Paddle steamer	Messrs. Russell & Co.	Greenock	United Kingdom	For Bristol Channel Express Steamship Company (Limited).
30 August	Dmitrii Donskoi	Cruiser	Admiralty Shipyard	Saint Petersburg	Russia	For Imperial Russian Navy.
30 August	Edam	Steamship	Fijenoord	Rotterdam	Netherlands	For Nederlandsch-Amerikaansche Stoomvaartmaatschappij.
30 August	Waitemata	Defender-class torpedo boat	John I. Thornycroft & Company	Chiswick	United Kingdom	For Royal Navy.
31 August	North Wall	Steamship	Robert Duncan & Co.	Port Glasgow	United Kingdom	For London and North Western Railway.
31 August	Poneke	Defender-class torpedo boat	John I. Thornycroft & Company	Chiswick	United Kingdom	For Royal Navy.
August	Cabo Verde	Steamship	Messrs. Earle's Shipbuilding and Engineering Company (Limited)	Hull	United Kingdom	For Empreza Nacional de Navegação.
August	Ngan Kin	Steamship	Messrs. Scott & Co.	Cartsdyke	United Kingdom	For Messrs Butterworth & Swire.
August	Rathlee	Steamship		River Clyde	United Kingdom	For private owner.
August	Sphinx	Thames barge		Woolwich	United Kingdom	For Admiralty.
August	Wild Rose	Steam yacht	Messrs. Inman & Sons	Lymington	United Kingdom	For Philip H. George.
1 September	Ætna	Malta-class tug	Messrs. Laird Bros.	Birkenhead	United Kingdom	For Royal Navy.
1 September	Bruce	Fishing trawler	Messrs. Hawthornes & Co.	Leith	United Kingdom	For General Steam Fishing Company (Limited).
1 September	Dunluce	Cargo ship	Harland & Wolff	Belfast	United Kingdom	For Harland & Wolff.
1 September	Pizarro	Steamship	Messrs. S. H. Morton & Co.	Leith	United Kingdom	For Messrs. J. Roca & Co.
3 September	Annie	Schooner	Messrs. J. J. Geddie	Garmouth	United Kingdom	For John Henderson.
3 September	Aycliffe	Steamship	Messrs. Raylton Dixon & Co.	Middlesbrough	United Kingdom	For Messrs. Hogg & Henderson.
3 September	Flaxmoss	Steamship	Messrs. Scott & Co.	Bowling	United Kingdom	For Flaxmoss Steamship Company (Limited).
3 September	R. A. Calderon	Merchantman	Messrs. John Reid & Co.	Port Glasgow	United Kingdom	For Messrs. W. & G. Lockett & Co.
3 September	Vigilant	Wheeled aviso	Arsenal de Rochefort	Rochefort	France	For French Navy
4 September	Drumblair	Merchantman	Messrs. Russell & Co.	Greenock	United Kingdom	For Messrs. Gillison & Chadwick.
4 September	Dunholme	Steamship	Messrs. William Gray & Co.	West Hartlepool	United Kingdom	For Messrs. J. J. Towers & Burdon.
4 September	Roebuck	Steamship	Vulcan Ironworks Company	Beverley	United Kingdom	For Messrs. Jackson Brothers & Company.
6 September	Iolanthe	Merchantman	Messrs. A. M'Millan & Son	Dumbarton	United Kingdom	For Messrs. Cruickshank, Gass & Co.
6 September	Progress	Steamship	Messrs. Muurdoch & Murray	Port Glasgow	United Kingdom	For Messrs. J. & J. Macfarlane.
6 September	Tai Sang	Steamship	London and Glasgow Engineering and Iron Shipbuilding Company	Govan	United Kingdom	For Indo-China Steam Navigation Company Ltd.
7 September	Danubian	Steamship	Messrs. Birrell, Stenhouse & Co.	Dumbarton	United Kingdom	For Messrs. Hugh Black & Co.
10 September	City of Truro	Steamship	Messrs. Palmer's	Jarrow	United Kingdom	For Tyne and Wear Steam Shipowning Company.
13 September	Elach Hall	Steamship	Messrs. M'Knight & M'Creadie	Ayr	United Kingdom	For Mr. Christie.
13 September	Ravensworth	Steamship	Messrs. John Priestman & Co.	Southwick	United Kingdom	For Savary, Young & Co.
15 September	Luneburg	Steamship	Messrs. John Blumer & Co.	Sunderland	United Kingdom	For J. Lohden & Co.
15 September	William Balls	Steamship	Messrs. J. Readhead & Sons	South Shields	United Kingdom	For W. D. C. Balls.
17 September	Albany	Steamship	Messrs. T. Turnbull & Son	Whitby	United Kingdom	For Messrs. T. D. Woodhead & Co.
17 September	Cloch	Steamship	Messrs. Dobie & Co.	Govan	United Kingdom	For Clyde Shipping Company.
17 September	Huntsman	Steamship	Palmer's Shipbuilding and Iron Company (Limited)	Jarrow	United Kingdom	For W. J. Jobling.
17 September	Iron Prince	Steamship	Messrs. C. S. Swan & Hunter	Wallsend-on-Tyne	United Kingdom	For James Knott.
17 September	Mawhera	Steamship	Messrs. H. M'Intyre & Co.	Paisley	United Kingdom	For W. R. Williams.
17 September	Sybil	Steam trawler	J. M. Briggs	Hull	United Kingdom	For Hartlepool Fishery Company, Limited.
18 September	Almandine	Steamship	Messrs. M. Pearse & Co.	Stockton-on-Tees	United Kingdom	For W. Tulley & Co.
18 September	Barracouta	Steamship	Messrs. J. & G. Thompson	Clydebank	United Kingdom	For Messrs. Laycraft & Co., or Messrs. William Guild & Co.
18 September	Cahors	Steamship	Messrs. John Key & Sons	Kinghorn	United Kingdom	For Australian Steam Navigation Company.
18 September	Gottardo	Steamship	Messrs. Alexander Stephen & Sons	Linthouse	United Kingdom	For Società Italiana di Transporti Marittimi Raggio & Co.
18 September	Tamaulipas	Steamship	Messrs. R. Napier & Sons	Govan	United Kingdom	For Compania Mexicana Transatlantica.
18 September	Indomptable	Terrible-class ironclad		Lorient	France	For French Navy.
18 September	Racile	Steamship	Palmer's Shipbuilding and Iron Company (Limited)	Howdon	United Kingdom	For Messrs. L and H. Jneret.
18 September	Triumph	Steamship	Sunderland Shipbuilding Company	Sunderland	United Kingdom	For Triumph Steamship Co. Ltd.
19 September	China	Steamship	Messrs. E. Withy & Co.	West Hartlepool	United Kingdom	For Messrs. D. & C. Maciver.
19 September	Dynamic	Ferry	Harland & Wolff	Belfast	United Kingdom	For Belfast Steamship Company.
19 September	Macrihanish	East Indiaman	Messrs. Robert Duncan & Co.	Port Glasgow	United Kingdom	For Hugh Hogarth.
19 September	Maria A. Hinde	Steamship	Messrs. Workman, Clarke & Co.	Belfast	United Kingdom	For William Hinde.
19 September	Methven Castle	Steamship	Barclay, Curle & Co.	Whiteinch	United Kingdom	For Castle Line.
19 September	Monadnock	Amphitrite-class monitor	Continental Iron Works	Greenpoint, New York	United States	For United States Navy.
19 September	Raylton Dixon	Steamship	Messrs. Raylton Dixon & Co.	Middlesbrough	United Kingdom	For Messrs. Jacob Christensen & Co.
19 September	Shannon	Steamship	Messrs. Russell & Co.	Greenock	United Kingdom	For James Nourse.
19 September	Stura	Steamship	Messrs. Blackwood & Gordon	Port Glasgow	United Kingdom	For Società Italiana di Transporti Marittimi Raggio & Co.
20 September	Balbus	Steamship	Barrow Ship Building Co. Ltd.	Barrow-in-Furness	United Kingdom	For T. Kish & Co.
20 September	Cygnet	Steamship	Messrs. Gourlay Bros.	Dundee	United Kingdom	For General Steam Navigation Company.
20 September	Inveruglas	Merchantman	Messrs. Robert Steele & Co.	Greenock	United Kingdom	For J. Macgregor & Son.
22 September	Hay Green	Steamship	Messrs. W. Gray & co.	West Hartlepool	United Kingdom	For Messrs. J. H. Murrell & Co.
25 September	Armine	Tug	C. Burt & Sons	Falmouth, Cornwall	United Kingdom	For Messrs Rushden Brothers, or J. H. Rushden, R. Rushden and J. Southeard.
29 September	Timaru	Steamship	Robert Thompson & Sons	Sunderland	United Kingdom	For Timaru Screw Collier Co.
September	Campechano	Steamship	Messrs. Murray Bros.	Dumbarton	United Kingdom	For private owner.
September	Nanshan	Steamship	Messrs. Charles Connell & Co.	Scotstoun	United Kingdom	For Nanshan Shipping Company (Limited).
September	Pilot	Fishing smack	Messrs. J. Wray & Son	Burton upon Stather	United Kingdom	For R. Hellier.
September	Ready	Lighthouse Tender	Messrs. T. B. Seath & Co.	Rutherglen	United Kingdom	For Trinity House.
September	Shoaymyo	Drifter	Beeching Brothers Ltd.	Great Yarmouth	United Kingdom	For George Beeching & Co. Ltd.
September	Swansea	Steamship	Blyth Shipbuilding Co. Ltd	Blyth	United Kingdom	For Mesnier et Cie.
2 October	Aorangi	Refrigerated cargo liner	John Elder & Co.	Govan	United Kingdom	For New Zealand Shipping Company.
2 October	Falloden	Steamship	Messrs. T. & W. Smith	North Shields	United Kingdom	For Messrs. M'Nabb, Young & Co.
3 October	Agenoria	Steamship	Messrs. R. Irvine & Co.	West Hartlepool	United Kingdom	For Messrs. M. Rickinson & Co.
3 October	Bosphorus	Steamship	Messrs. W. Dobson & Co.	Low Walker-on-Tyne	United Kingdom	For Messrs. Hall Bros.
3 October	County of Durham	Steamship	Priestman & Co	Sunderland	United Kingdom	For Edward Jobson.
4 October	City of Truro	Steamship	Messrs W Gray and Co	West Hartlepool	United Kingdom	For Cornwall Steamship Company (Limited).
4 October	Earl of Jersey	Barque	Barrow Ship Building Co. Ltd.	Barrow-in-Furness	United Kingdom	For D. Brown & Sons.
5 October	Dawn	Steamship		Grangemouth	United Kingdom	For Messrs. Yeld & Co.
6 October	Girdleness	Steamship	Messrs. Hall & Co.	Footdee	United Kingdom	For Messrs. John Cook & Son.
6 October	Oakfield	Steamship	Messrs. Oswald, Mordaunt & Co.	Southampton	United Kingdom	For Joseph Brown.
6 October	Rosario	Steamship	Earle's Shipbuilding and Engineering Co.	Hull	United Kingdom	For Wilson Line.
8 October	Alcester	Merchantman	Messrs. Russell & Co.	Greenock	United Kingdom	For Messrs. Haws, Lawson & Co.
8 October	Egret	Steamship	Sir W. G. Armstrong, Mitchell & Co., Limited	Elswick	United Kingdom	For General Steam Navigation Company.
9 October	Port Adelaide	Barque	Messrs. Russell & Co.	Kingston	United Kingdom	For Port Line.
13 October	Amphion	Leander-class cruiser		Pembroke Dockyard	United Kingdom	For Royal Navy.
13 October	Robina	Steamship	Joseph L. Thompson & Sons	Sunderland	United Kingdom	For Robinson & Rowland.
15 October	Marcia	Steamship	Messrs. Schlesinger, Davis & Co.	Wallsend	United Kingdom	For Messrs. Ward & Holzapfel.
15 October	Thomas Adams	Steamship	Messrs. Raylton Dixon & Co	Stockton-on-Tees	United Kingdom	For Messrs. T. C. Lawrence & Co.
16 October	Alicia	Steamship	London and Glasgow Engineering and Iron Shipbuilding Company	Govan	United Kingdom	For Linea de Vapores Serra.
16 October	Conde d'En	Steamship	Messrs. Blackwood & Gordon	Port Glasgow	United Kingdom	For Amazon Steam Navigation Company (Limited).
16 October	Crown of Arragon	Steamship	Messrs. Scott & Co.	Greenock	United Kingdom	For Messrs. Prentice, Clapperton & Co.
16 October	Derry Castle	Barque	Dobie and Co.	Govan	United Kingdom	For Francis Spaight & Sons.
16 October	Knight of St. George	Steamship	Messrs. Thomas Royden & Sons	Liverpool	United Kingdom	For Messrs. Greenshields, Cowie & Co.
16 October	MacDiarmid	Merchantman	Messrs. A. M'Millan & Son	Dumbarton	United Kingdom	For Messrs. A. M'Millan & Son.
16 October	Mascotte	Steamship	Messrs. W. Harkness & Son	Middlesbrough	United Kingdom	For private owner.
17 October	Elstow	Steamship	North of England Shipbuilding Co.	Sunderland	United Kingdom	For J. Fawcestt.
17 October	Guido	Cargo ship	Harland & Wolff	Belfast	United Kingdom	For La Compania de Navigacion la Flecha.
18 October	Camel	Steamship	Messrs. Mordey, Carney & Co. (Limited)	Newport	United Kingdom	For J. E. Scott.
18 October	Grip-fast	Steamship	Messrs. Hall, Russell & Co.	Aberdeen	United Kingdom	For Messrs. William Leslie & Co.
18 October	Hoy Head	Steamship	Abercorn Shipbuilding Company	Paisley	United Kingdom	For Charles Richard Scott.
18 October	John Knox	Steamship	Palmer's Shipbuilding and Engineering Company (Limited)	location	United Kingdom	For Messrs. Niel Maclean & Co.
19 October	Sirsa	Steamship	A. & J. Inglis	Glasgow	United Kingdom	For British India Steam Navigation Company.
20 October	Brabo	Steamship	Messrs. H. Murray & Co. Ltd	Dumbarton	United Kingdom	For G. P. Walford.
20 October	Bryngwyn	Merchantman	Messrs. W. H. Potter & Sons	Liverpool	United Kingdom	For David Morgan.
20 October	Western Star	Steamship	Messrs. S. P. Austin & Son	Sunderland	United Kingdom	For Messrs. Johnson Brothers & Co.
22 October	William Bailey	Steamship	Earle's Shipbuilding & Engineering Company	Hull	United Kingdom	For Messrs. Bailey & Leetham.
30 October	Ardlethen	Steamship	Sunderland Shipbuilding Company, Limited	Sunderland	United Kingdom	For Adam & Co.
30 October	Chigwell	Steamship	Bartram, Haswell & Co.	Sunderland	United Kingdom	For A. Suart.
31 October	Andreta	Merchantman	Messrs. Richardson, Duck & Co.	South Stockton	United Kingdom	For Messrs. E. F. & W. Roberts.
31 October	King Arthur	Fishing smack	Thomas W. Walker	Scarborough	United Kingdom	For J. R. D. Romyn.
31 October	Regian	Steamship	Messrs. Robert Thompson & Sons	Southwick	United Kingdom	For Regian Steam Shipping Company.
31 October	Romeo	Steamship	Messrs. Raylton Dixon & Co.	Middlesbrough	United Kingdom	For Messrs. C. T. Bowring & Co.
October	Alassio	Steamship	Strand Slipway Company	Newport	United Kingdom	For Richard W. Jones & Co.
October	Albano	Steamship	James Laing	Sunderland	United Kingdom	For W. & T. W. Pinkney, or Neptune Steam Navigation Co. Ltd.
October	Avocet	Steamship	Messrs. Barclay, Curle & Co.	Whiteinch	United Kingdom	For Bird Line.
October	Caesia	Steamship	Messrs. Murdoch & Murray	Port Glasgow	United Kingdom	For Messrs. Stephen, Mawson & Goss.
October	Cataluna	Steamship	Messrs. William Denny & Bros.	Dumbarton	United Kingdom	For Campania Transatlantic.
October	Eagle	Tug	Messrs Harvey and Co	Hayle	United Kingdom	For Messrs. Deeble and Sons.
October	Falkner	Gunboat	Messrs. W. Simons & Co.	Renfrew	United Kingdom	For Commissioners of Melbourn Harbour.
October	Graville	Steamship	Messrs. A. Stephen & Sons	Linthouse	United Kingdom	For C. Brown.
October	Heathercliff	Steamship	Messrs. William Hamilton & Co.	Port Glasgow	United Kingdom	For Messrs. John Melmore & Co.
October	Itata	Barque	Messrs. R. & J. Evans	Liverpool	United Kingdom	For private owner.
October	Juan Cunningham	Steamship	W. B. Thompson	Whiteinch	United Kingdom	For private owners.
October	Sylfaen	Steamship	Messrs. John Fullarton & Co.	Paisley	United Kingdom	For Messrs. Kneeshaw, Lupton & Co.
1 November	Castlebank	Steamship	Messrs. Wigham, Richardson & Co	Low Walker	United Kingdom	For Castle Line.
1 November	Edward E. Barrett	Schooner	C. & R. Poillon	Brooklyn, New York	United States	For New Jersey Pilots.
1 November	Martos	Steamship	Messrs. Gourlay	Dundee	United Kingdom	For Sr. Sister.
1 November	Noordland	Steamship	Messrs. Laird Bros.	Birkenhead	United Kingdom	For Société Anonymé de Navigation Belge Americaine.
1 November	Strathlyon	Steamship	Messrs. J. M'Arthur & Co.	Abbotsinch	United Kingdom	For Messrs. James Hay & Sons.
1 November	Thalia	Steamship	Messrs. W. Gray & Co.	West Hartlepool	United Kingdom	For Messrs. A. Gladstone & Co.
1 November	Thane	Steamship	Messrs. Alexander Stephen & Sons	Dundee	United Kingdom	For Messrs. R. A. Mudie & Sons.
1 November	The Wild Rose	Steamship	Vulcan Ironworks Company	Beverley	United Kingdom	For John Hobson.
1 November	Unnamed	Dredger	Messrs. S. H. Morton & Co.	Leith	United Kingdom	For Tees Conservancy Commissioners.
3 November	Adler	Habicht-class gunboat	Kaiserliche Werft	Kiel	Germany	For Kaiserliche Marine.
3 November	Clieveden	Steamship	John Blumer & Co.	Sunderland	United Kingdom	For McNabb, Young & Co.
3 November	Helensburgh	Merchantman	Messrs. Robert Duncan & Sons	Port Glasgow	United Kingdom	For Messrs. Thom & Cameron.
3 November	North Erin	Steamship	Messrs. Palmer & Co.	Jarrow	United Kingdom	For Messrs. Hugh Roberts & Son.
3 November	Strathness	Steamship	Messrs Burrell & Sons	Dumbarton	United Kingdom	For Messrs. James Hay & Sons.
3 November	Violet	Paddle steamer	Messrs. W. Allsup & Sons	Preston, Lancashire	United Kingdom	For Wallasey Commissioners.
5 November	Manaos	Steamship	Messrs. James & George Thomson	Clydebank	United Kingdom	For Brazilian Steam Navigation Company.
5 November	Sierra Pedrosa	Merchantman	Messrs. John Reid & Co.	Port Glasgow	United Kingdom	For Messrs. Thomson, Anderson & Co.
12 November	Bilbao	Steamship	Robert Thompson & Sons	Sunderland	United Kingdom	For Bilbao Steamship Co., or Messrs. E. Bregeon & M. Thomas.
14 November	Bay of Panama	Sailing ship	Harland & Wolff	Belfast	United Kingdom	For J. Bullock & Co.
14 November	Guyuni	Tug	Messrs. Green	Blackwall	United Kingdom	For Sproston Dock & Foundry Co.
15 November	Abana	Steamship	Messrs. M. Pearse & Co.	Stockton-on-Tees	United Kingdom	For private owner.
15 November	Arabia	Steamship	Messrs. David & William Henderson & Co.	Meadowside	United Kingdom	For Anchor Line.
15 November	Don	Steamship	Messrs. John Duthie, Sons & Co.	Aberdeen	United Kingdom	For Messrs. G. & W. Davidson.
15 November	Reindeer	Mariner-class gunvessel		Devonport Dockyard	United Kingdom	For Royal Navy.
15 November	Benjamin F. Packard	Down Easter	Goss, Sawyer & Packard	Bath, Maine	United States	For private owner.
15 November	Delphus	Steamship	Barrow Ship Building Co. Ltd.	Barrow-in-Furness	United Kingdom	For Barrow Ship Building Co. Ltd.
15 November	Mulgrave	Steamship	Joseph L. Thompson & Sons	Sunderland	United Kingdom	For John H. Barry & Co.
15 November	Ripon City	Steamship	Messrs. William Gray & Co.	West Hartlepoo	United Kingdom	For Furness Line.
15 November	Welcombe	Steamship	Messrs. Raylton Dixon & Co.	Middlesbrough	United Kingdom	For Messrs. Corfield & Robson.
16 November	Northern Star	Steamship	Messrs. C. S. Swan & Hunter	Wallsend	United Kingdom	For Messrs. Johnson Bros. & Co.
16 November	Perseo	Steamship	Messrs. Robert Napier & Sons	Govan	United Kingdom	For Società Italiana di Transporti Marittimi Raggio & Co.
16 November	Peveril	Steamship	Messrs. William Hamilton & Co.	Port Glasgow	United Kingdom	For Messrs. George Hood & Co.
16 November	Pochard	Steamship	Messrs. David J. Dunlop & Co.	Port Glasgow	United Kingdom	For Cork Steamship company (Limited).
17 November	Budapest	Steamship	Messrs. Burrell & Son	Dombarton	United Kingdom	For Messrs. Burrell & Son.
17 November	Platypus	Dredger	Messrs. W. Simons & Co	Renfrew	United Kingdom	For Queensland Government.
17 November	Secundra	Steamship	Messrs. A. & J. Inglis	Pointhouse	United Kingdom	For British India Steam Navigation Company.
17 November	The Queen	Paddle steamer	Messrs. Caird & Co.	Greenock	United Kingdom	For Lochlomond Steamboat Company.
19 November	Drummeltan	Merchantman	Messrs. Russell & Co.	Dumbarton	United Kingdom	For Messrs. Gillison & Chadwick.
19 November	Ruaphephu	Steamship	Messrs. John Elder & Co.	Fairfield	United Kingdom	For New Zealand Shipping Company.
19 November	Valetta	Steamship	Messrs. Caird & Co.	Greenock	United Kingdom	For Peninsular and Oriental Steam Navigation Company.
20 November	Narva	Steamship	Messrs. Earle's Shipbuilding and Engineering Company, Limited	Hull	United Kingdom	For Messrs. Bailey & Leatham.
27 November	Astronomer	Steamship	Messrs Aitken & Mansel	Whiteinch	United Kingdom	For private owner.
28 November	Crathie	Steamship	Messrs. John Key & Co.	Kinghorn	United Kingdom	For W. Todd Moffatt.
28 November	General Concha	General Concha-class gunboat	Reales Astilleros de Esteiro	Ferrol	Spain	For Spanish Navy.
29 November	Fylingdales	Steamship	Joseph L. Thompson & Sons	Sunderland	United Kingdom	For Robinson & Rowland.
November	Brock	Tug	Messrs. T. B. Seath & Co.	Rutherglen	United Kingdom	For private owner.
November	Caller Ou	Steam trawler			United Kingdom	For private owner.
November	Clan Davidson	Steamship	Messrs. Alexander Stephen & Sons	Linthouse	United Kingdom	For Messrs. Thomas Dunlop & Sons.
November	Claudia	Steamship	Messrs. Murdoch & Murray	Port Glasgow	United Kingdom	For Messrs. Stephens, Mawson & Goss.
November	Cluny Castle	Merchantman	Messrs. Barclay, Curle & Co.	Whiteinch	United Kingdom	For Sir Donald Currie.
November	Dido	Steam launch	Messrs. T. B. Seath & Co.	Rutherglen	United Kingdom	For Irrawaddy Flotilla Co.
November	Elektra	Steamship		Trieste	Austria-Hungary	For Österreichischer Lloyd.
November	Elms	Steamship	Messrs. T. B. Seath & Co.	Rutherglen	United Kingdom	For private owner.
November	Euterpe	Steamship	Messrs. Alexander Stephen & Sons	Linthouse	United Kingdom	For Messrs. Osborn & Wallis.
November	Fiji	Sternwheeler	Messrs. D. & W. Henderson & Co.	Partick	United Kingdom	For Colonial Sugar Co.
November	Invergowrie	Steam barge	Messrs. Blackwood & Gordon	Port Glasgow	United Kingdom	For Sir William Arrol & Co.
November	Norseman	Steamship	Messrs. John Fullerton & Co.	Paisley	United Kingdom	For Messrs. J. & J. Macfarlane.
November	Storm Cock	Tug	Messrs. H. M'Intyre & Co.	Paisley	United Kingdom	For W. B. Hill.
November	Topaz	Steamship	Messrs. T. B. Seath & Co.	Rutherglen	United Kingdom	For W. Robertson.
1 December	Ciudad de Santander	Steamship	Messrs. William Denny & Bros.	Dumbarton	United Kingdom	For Compania Transatlantica.
1 December	Jiyuan	Cruiser	AG Vulcan	Stettin	Germany	For Imperial Chinese Navy.
3 December	Batman	Gunboat and hopper ship	Messrs. W. Simons & Co.	Renfrew	United Kingdom	For Melbourne Harbour Commissioners.
3 December	Elsy	Steamship	E. Wales	Hull	United Kingdom	For private owner.
3 December	Siphnos and Eubee	Steamship	Messrs. Scott & Co	Greenock	United Kingdom	For private owner.
5 December	Earl of Beaconsfield	Merchantman	Messrs. Russell & Co.	Port Glasgow	United Kingdom	For Earl Line.
6 December	Kate	Tug	Allen & Ward	Balmain	New South Wales	For Richard Manning.
12 December	Nan Chen	Nan Chen-class cruiser	Howaldtswerke-Deutsche Werft	Kiel	Germany	For Imperial Chinese Navy.
13 December	Dunvegan	Steamship	Messrs. Scott & Co.	Bowling	United Kingdom	For Messrs. John & William W. S. Smith.
13 December	Ella	Steamship	Messrs. Alexander Stephen & Sons	Linthouse	United Kingdom	For Thomas Rodenacker.
13 December	Gulf of Akaba	Steamship	Messrs. Raylton Dixon & Co.	Middlesbrough	United Kingdom	For Gulf Line.
13 December	Hermon	Steamship	Messrs. Edward Withy & Co.	Middleton	United Kingdom	For George Horsley.
14 December	Crown of Denmark	Merchantman	Messrs. A. M'Millan & Son	Dumbarton	United Kingdom	For Messrs. Robertson, Cruickshank & Co.
14 December	Ferric	Steamship	Messrs. MacIlwaine & Lewis	Belfast	United Kingdom	For Messrs. H. J. Scott & Co.
15 December	Barbara	Schooner	Mr. Geddie	Banff	United Kingdom	For Mr. Marr.
15 December	Cathay	Steamship	Messrs. W. Gray & Co.	West Hartlepool	United Kingdom	For Messrs. Gladstone & Cornforth.
15 December	Dee	Steamship	Messrs. Hall, Russell & Co.	Footdee	United Kingdom	For Messrs. G. & W. Davidson.
15 December	Eider	Steamship	Messrs. John Elder & Co.	Fairfield	United Kingdom	For Norddeutsche Lloyd.
15 December	Francisca	Steamship	London and Glasgow Shipbuilding Co.	Govan	United Kingdom	For Linea de Vapores Serra Bilbao.
15 December	Germania	Steamship	Messrs. M. Pearse & Co.	Stockton-on-Tees	United Kingdom	For Messrs. Ward & Holzapfel.
15 December	Giovanni Bausan	Cruiser	Sir W. G. Armstrong Mitchell & Co.	Elswick	United Kingdom	For Regia Marina.
15 December	Newton	Steamship	Messrs. C. S. Swan & Hunter	Wallsend	United Kingdom	For Newton Steamship Company (Limited).
15 December	Oaxaca	Steamship	Messrs. Napier & Sons	Govan	United Kingdom	For Compania Mexicana Transatlantica.
15 December	Triton	Steamship	Messrs Cox and Co	Falmouth, Cornwall	United Kingdom	For Falmouth Fisheries' Company.
15 December	Turkistan	Merchantman	Messrs. Russell & Co.	Port Glasgow	United Kingdom	For Messrs. W. & J. Crawford.
15 December	Venture	Steam fishing vessel	Messrs. J. M'Kenzie & Co.	Leith	United Kingdom	For A. Cook.
15 December	Zurich	Steamship	Messrs. T. Turnbull & Son	Whitby	United Kingdom	For Messrs. Turnbull, Brightman & Co.
18 December	Celebes	Steamship	Messrs. Inglis	Pointhouse	United Kingdom	For Nederlandsche Indische Stoomvaart Maatschappij.
18 December	Gerovia	Steamship	Messrs. Scott & Co.	Cartsdyke	United Kingdom	For MM. Cyprien, Fabre et Cie.
18 December	Imperieuse	Imperieuse-class cruiser		Portsmouth Dockyard	United Kingdom	For Royal Navy.
22 December	Lussin	Torpedo cruiser	Stabilimento Tecnico Triestino	Trieste	Austria-Hungary	For Austro-Hungarian Navy.
27 December	Gulf of Papua	Steamship	Messrs. Raylton Dixon & Co.	Middlesbrough	United Kingdom	For Greenock Steamship Company, Limited.
27 December	Mohican	sloop of war	Mare Island Navy Yard	Vallejo, California	United States	For United States Navy.
27 December	Rydal Water	Steamship	Messrs. A. Leslie & Co.	Hebburn	United Kingdom	For Rydal Water Steam Ship Co. Ltd.
28 December	Nerbudda	Steamship	Messrs. William Denny & Bros.	Dumbarton	United Kingdom	For British India Steam Navigation Company.
29 December	America	Steamship	Messrs. J. & G. Thomson	Clydebank	United Kingdom	For National Steamship Company.
29 December	Fernbrook	Steamship	Messrs. W. Gray & Co.	West Hartlepool	United Kingdom	For Messrs. John Foster & Co.
29 December	Idas	Steamship	Palmer's Shipbuilding and Iron Co. (Limited)	Jarrow	United Kingdom	For Mr. Westcotte.
29 December	Minerva	Steamship	Palmer's Shipbuilding and Iron Co. (Limited)	Jarrow	United Kingdom	For Messrs. Svanoe & Partners.
29 December	Lady St. Germans	Steamship	Palmer's Shipbuilding and Iron Co. (Limited)	Jarrow	United Kingdom	For Messrs. J. & R. Bovey & Co.
29 December	Oopach	Steamship	Messrs. D. & W. Henderson	Partick	United Kingdom	For China Shippers' Mutual Steam Navigation Company (Limited).
29 December	Texan	Cargo ship	Harland & Wolff	Belfast	United Kingdom	For West India Shipping Co.
29 December	Thropton	Steamship	Messrs. C. S. Swan & Hunter	Wallsend	United Kingdom	For R. B. Avery.
29 December	Ursula	Steamship	Joseph L. Thompson & Sons	Sunderland	United Kingdom	For Thomas E. Hick.
31 December	Manora	Steamship	Messrs. William Denny & Bros.	Dumbarton	United Kingdom	For British India (Association) Steam Navigation Company (Limited).
31 December	Brandon	Mésange-class wheeled aviso	Chantiers et Ateliers Augustin Normand	Le Havre	France	For French Navy
December	Frutera	Steamship	Messrs H M'Intyre and Co	Paisley	United Kingdom	For Messrs. Goodyear and Co.
December	M. Glure	Steamship		North Shields	United Kingdom	For private owner.
Unknown date	Aberlady Bay	Steamship	Messrs. A. Leslie & Co.	Hebburn	United Kingdom	For private owner.
Unknown date	Abrota	Merchantman	Short Bros.	Sunderland	United Kingdom	For J. Graham.
Unknown date	Alameda	Passenger ship	William Cramp & Sons	Philadelphia, Pennsylvania	United States	For Alaska Steamship Company.
Unknown date	Alaska	Merchantman	Short Bros.	Sunderland	United Kingdom	For M. Thompson & Co.
Unknown date	Alassio	Merchantman	The Strand Slipway Co.	Sunderland	United Kingdom	For R. W. Jones & Co.
Unknown date	Albacore	Albacore-class gunboat	Messrs. Laird Bros.	Birkenhead	United Kingdom	For Royal Navy.
Unknown date	Albany	Steamship	Messrs. Laird Bros.	Birkenhead	United Kingdom	For Birkenhead Shipping Company Limited
Unknown date	Alcester	Steamship	Messrs. Richardson, Duck & Co	South Stockton	United Kingdom	For private owner.
Unknown date	Alfredo	Steamship	Messrs. R. & J. Evans & Co.	Liverpool	United Kingdom	For private owner.
Unknown date	Alice	Merhantman	S. P. Austin & Son	Sunderland	United Kingdom	For R. Rettich.
Unknown date	Aline	Merchantman	William Doxford & Sons	Sunderland	United Kingdom	For T. Marwood & Sons.
Unknown date	America	Cargo liner	J. & G. Thompson	Clydebank	United Kingdom	For National Line.
Unknown date	Amity	Steamship	James Laing	Sunderland	United Kingdom	For G. Haig & Co.
Unknown date	A. T. Gifford	Schooner		Essex, Massachusetts	United States	For George Dennis.
Unknown date	Atrato	Merchantman	James Laing	Sunderland	United Kingdom	For The Pinkney & Sons Steamship Company.
Unknown date	Auckland Castle	Merchantman	S. P. Austin & Son	Sunderland	United Kingdom	For Mordey & Carney.
Unknown date	Avoca	Merchantman	The Strand Slipway Company	Sunderland	United Kingdom	For Westcott & Lawrence.
December	Bellcairn	Steamship	Messrs. R. Irvine & Co.	West Hartlepool	United Kingdom	For private owner.
Unknown date	Bergamo	Merchantman	William Pickersgill & Sons	Sunderland	United Kingdom	For R. W. Jones & Co.
Unknown date	Bird o' Freedom	Cutter	Messrs. Camper & Nicholson	Gosport	United Kingdom	For J. D. Feltham.
Unknown date	Blanchland	Merchantman	Osbourne, Graham, & Co.	Sunderland	United Kingdom	For Hannay, Boyd & Co.
Unknown date	Bryn Glas	Merchantman	James Laing	Sunderland	United Kingdom	For Jones Bros. & Co.
Unknown date	Cairo	Merchantman	James Laing	Sunderland	United Kingdom	For G. H. Wills & Co.
Unknown date	Carranza	Merchantman	Priestman & Co.	Sunderland	United Kingdom	For Societa Maritime di Vizcaya.
Unknown date	Castlecrag	Steamship	Messrs. Wigham, Richardson & Co.	Low Walker	United Kingdom	For Messrs. Tomlinson, Thomson & Co.
Unknown date	Chelona	Merchantman	Bartram, Haswell & Co. Ltd	Sunderland	United Kingdom	For G. J. Hay & Co.
Unknown date	Chelydra	Merchantman	The Strand Slipway Company	Sunderland	United Kingdom	For C. Hutchinson.
Unknown date	City of Ashland	Paddle steamer			United Kingdom	For Superior Lumber Company.
Unknown date	Clare	Merchantman	John Blumer & Co	Sunderland	United Kingdom	For S.S. Clare Limited.
Unknown date	Claxton	Steamship	Messrs. R. Craggs & Sons.	Middlesbrough	United Kingdom	For private owner.
Unknown date	Craiglands	Steamship	Messrs. R. Irvine & Co.	West Hartlepool	United Kingdom	For private owner.
Unknown date	Crete	Merchantman	Joseph L. Thompson & Sons	Sunderland	United Kingdom	For Dent & Co.
Unknown date	Crindau	Steamship	J. Blumer & Co.	Sunderland	United Kingdom	For Stephens, Mawson & Case.
Unknown date	Dent Holme	Merchantman	Joseph L. Thompson & sons	Sunderland	United Kingdom	For Hine Bros.
Unknown date	Dewsland	Merchantman	Joseph L. Thompson & Sons	Sunderland	United Kingdom	For John Marychurch & Co.
Unknown date	Dicky	Steamship	Gebr. Howaldt	Kiel	Germany	For private owner.
Unknown date	Duchess	Merchantman	Short Bros.	Sunderland	United Kingdom	For J. W. Taylor.
Unknown date	Duchess	Steamship	Messrs. Edward Withy & Co.	West Hartlepool	United Kingdom	For private owner.
Unknown date	Dunedin	Steamship	William Doxford & Sons	Sunderland	United Kingdom	For J. & M. Gunn & Co.
Unknown date	Dunmail	Merchantman	S. P. Austin & Son	Sunderland	United Kingdom	For Sharp & Co.
Unknown date	Earl of Chester	Merchantman	John Blumer & Co.	Sunderland	United Kingdom	For Earl of Chester Steamship Co.
Unknown date	Eastern Star	Merchantman	Robert Thompson & Sons	Sunderland	United Kingdom	For Johnson Bros. & Co.
Unknown date	Eben D. Jordan	Schooner	Ambrose A. Martin	Boston, Massachusetts	United States	For Thomas Cooper.
Unknown date	El Dorado	Merchantman	Joseph L. Thompson & Sons	Sunderland	United Kingdom	For Henry Scholefield & Son.
Unknown date	Ella Sayer	Steamship	William Doxford & Sons	Sunderland	United Kingdom	For Fisher, Renwick & Co.
Unknown date	Ellen	Steamship	Smith & Forrester Co.	Brisbane	Queensland	For Messrs. Bresli & Watson.
Unknown date	Esperance	Merchantman	Short Bros.	Sunderland	United Kingdom	For T. Freear.
Unknown date	Etna	Paddle Tug	Messrs. Laird Bros.	Birkenhead	United Kingdom	For Admiralty.
Unknown date	Fern Holme	Ocean liner	Joseph L. Thompson & Sons	Sunderland	United Kingdom	For Hine Bros.
Unknown date	Fox	Schooner	Brundrit & Co.	Runcorn	United Kingdom	For T. C. Cooper & Co. Ltd.
Unknown date	Frank Buckland	Fishing trawler	John Bell	Grimsby	United Kingdom	For Joshua Loughton.
Unknown date	General Chanzy	Steamship	Palmer's Shipbuilding and Iron Co. (Limited)	Jarrow	United Kingdom	For G. Pergeline.
Unknown date	Glanrheidol	Merchantman	William Doxford & Sons	Sunderland	United Kingdom	For Glanrheidol Steamship Co.
Unknown date	Glendower	Merchantman	William Pickersgill & Sons	Sunderland	United Kingdom	For Hurley, Matthews & Co.
Unknown date	Governor Newell	Sternwheeler		Portland, Oregon	United States	For Shoalwater Bay Transportation Co.
Unknown date	Grace	Barquentine	William Bayley & Sons	Ipswich	United Kingdom	For private owner.
Unknown date	Grahame	Sternwheeler	John W. Smith	Fort Chipewyan	Canada	For Hudson's Bay Company.
Unknown date	Greetlands	Merchantman	D. Baxter & Co.	Sunderland	United Kingdom	For W. Tone.
Unknown date	Harrogate	Merchantman	Short Bros.	Sunderland	United Kingdom	For Harrogate Steamship Co.
Unknown date	Harrogate	Steamship	Messrs. Edward Withy & Co.	West Hartlepool	United Kingdom	For private owner.
Unknown date	Highfield	Steamship	Messrs. Richardson, Duck & Co	South Stockton	United Kingdom	For private owner.
Unknown date	Highland Prince	Merchantman	Short Bros	Sunderland	United Kingdom	For James Knott.
Unknown date	Hoselaw	Steamship	Robert Thompson & Sons	Southwick	United Kingdom	For G. Reid.
Unknown date	Hymettus	Merchantman	Kish, Boolds & Co	Sunderland	United Kingdom	For T. Kish.
Unknown date	Ida Marshall	Merchantman	Osbourne, Graham & Co	Sunderland	United Kingdom	For J. F. Marshall & Co.
Unknown date	Imperatriz Theresa	Paddle steamer	Messrs. Laird Bros.	Birkenhead	United Kingdom	For private owner.
Unknown date	Incemore	Steamship	Messrs. Richardson, Duck & Co	South Stockton	United Kingdom	For private owner.
Unknown date	Isle of Cyprus	Steamship	Priestman & Co	Sunderland	United Kingdom	For Dixon, Robson & Co.
Unknown date	Isle of Dursey	Merchantman	Priestman & Co	Sunderland	United Kingdom	For Dixon, Robson & Co.
Unknown date	Itata	Barque	R. & J. Evans	Liverpool	United Kingdom	For Newark Shipping Company.
Unknown date	Ivanhoe	Merchantman	D. Baxter & Co	Sunderland	United Kingdom	For G. C. Ward.
Unknown date	Ivy Holme	Steamship	Joseph L. Thompson & Sons	Sunderland	United Kingdom	For Hine Bros.
Unknown date	J.M. Allmendinger	Steam barge	Albert Burgoyne	Benton Harbor, Michigan	United States	For John Allmendinger and Samuel Hull.
Unknown date	John Morrison	Steamship	James Laing	Sunderland	United Kingdom	For S. A. Morrison.
Unknown date	Katy	Merchantman	Joseph L. Thompson & Sons	Sunderland	United Kingdom	For R. Gordon & Co.
Unknown date	Kostroma	Cruiser		Odesa	Russia	For Imperial Russian Navy.
Unknown date	La Argentina	Corvette	Stabilimento Tecnico Triestino	Trieste	Austria-Hungary	For Argentine Navy.
Unknown date	Lathom	Merchantman	Messrs. Potter & Sons	Liverpool	United Kingdom	For private owner.
Unknown date	Loch Ard	Steamship	Messrs. Ramage & Ferguson	Leith	United Kingdom	For private owner.
Unknown date	Lucea Mason	Sternwheeler	J. H. Peterson	St. Helens, Oregon	United States	For Farmers' Transportation Company.
Unknown date	Lisnacrieve	Steamship	Messrs. Richardson, Duck & Co	South Stockton	United Kingdom	For private owner.
Unknown date	Lucknow	Merchantman	William Doxford & Sons	Sunderland	United Kingdom	For G. D. Tyser & Co.
Unknown date	Mabel	Steamship	T. B. Seath & Co.	Rutherglen	United Kingdom	For James Hornsby.
Unknown date	Magnolia	Steamship	Osbourne, Graham & Co.	Sunderland	United Kingdom	For Turnbull, Potts & Co.
Unknown date	Marquis Scicluna	Merchantman	The Sunderland Shipbuilding Co. Limited	Sunderland	United Kingdom	For C. Tully.
Unknown date	Matador	Steamship	W. B. Thompson	Glasgow	United Kingdom	For private owner.
Unknown date	Mayo	Merchantman	William Pickersgill & Sons	Sunderland	United Kingdom	For Compagnia Bilbaina de Navegacion.
Unknown date	Melbourne	Gunboat	Sir William Armstrong, Mitchell & Co.	Newcastle upon Tyne	United Kingdom	For Victorian Naval Forces.
Unknown date	Mennythorpe	Steamship	Messrs. R. Irvine & Co.	West Hartlepool	United Kingdom	For .
Unknown date	Meteor	Steam yacht		Nyack, New York	United States	For Quick Transport Steamship Company.
Unknown date	Meteor	Paddle tug	Messrs. Laird Bros.	Birkenhead	United Kingdom	For Admiralty.
Unknown date	Mona's Queen	Paddle launch		Stockport	United Kingdom	For private owner.
Unknown date	Monmouthshire	Merchantman	William Pickersgill & Sons	Sunderland	United Kingdom	For R. Gething & Co.
Unknown date	Monte Rosa	Merchantman	North of England Shipbuilding Company	Sunderland	United Kingdom	For Cay & Hall.
Unknown date	Mutin	School ship			France	For French Navy.
Unknown date	Myosotis	Steamship	Messrs. R. Craggs & Sons.	Middlesbrough	United Kingdom	For private owner.
Unknown date	Myrtle Branch	Steamship	Bartram, Haswell & Co.	Sunderland	United Kingdom	For Nautilus Steam Shipping Co. Ltd.
Unknown date	Nantes Hambourg	Merchantman	Kish, Boolds & Co	Sunderland	United Kingdom	For Compagnie Nantaise de Navigation à Vapeur.
Unknown date	Nebo	Steamship	James Laing	Sunderland	United Kingdom	For Messrs. Pinkney & Sons.
Unknown date	Nelcebee	Steamship	T. B. Seath & Co.	Rutherglen	United Kingdom	For private owner.
Unknown date	Nicholas Vagliano	Merchantman	Bartram, Haswell & Co.	Sunderland	United Kingdom	For Vagliano Bros.
Unknown date	Ninian Stuart	Merchantman	William Pickersgill & Sond	Sunderland	United Kingdom	For Morel Bros. & Co.
Unknown date	Numida	Merchantman	Sunderland Shipbuilding Company Limited	Sunderland	United Kingdom	For Porteous & Senier.
Unknown date	Olive	Merchantman	William Pickersgill & Sons	Sunderland	United Kingdom	For Hopper & Crosby.
Unknown date	Oxon	Merchantman	John Blumer & Co.	Sunderland	United Kingdom	For H. Samman.
Unknown date	Pactolus	Merchantman	Kish, Boolds & Co.	Sunderland	United Kingdom	For T. Kish.
Unknown date	Padang	Steamship	Messrs. Raylton Dixon & Co.	Middlesbrough	United Kingdom	For .
Unknown date	Pelops	Steamship	Messrs. Potter & Sons	Liverpool	United Kingdom	For private owner.
Unknown date	Penyghent	Merchantman	Osbourne, Graham & Co.	Sunderland	United Kingdom	For Myers Bros.
Unknown date	Phœnix	Merchantman	North of England Shipbuilding Company	Sunderland	United Kingdom	For A. Smith & Co.
Unknown date	Pine Branch	Merchantman	Bartram, Haswell & Co.	Sunderland	United Kingdom	For F. & W. Ritson.
Unknown date	Prinz Alexander	Steamship	Germania Shipbuilding Co.	Kiel	Germany	For Anglia Company.
Unknown date	Pioneer	Ferry		East Providence, Rhode Island	United States	For Pawtucket Steamboat Co.
Unknown date	Pollux	Steamship	Lindholmens Varv	Gothenburg	Sweden	For Trelleborgs Ångfartygs Nya A/B Avena.
Unknown date	Ranmoor	Steamship	Messrs. Edward Withy & Co.	West Hartlepool	United Kingdom	For private owner.
Unknown date	Region	Merchantman	Robert Thompson & Sons	Southwick	United Kingdom	For Region Steamship Co. Ltd.
Unknown date	Renpor	Steamship	Messrs. Edward Withy & Co.	Middleton	United Kingdom	For private owner.
Unknown date	Resolute	Merchantman	Short Bros	Sunderland	United Kingdom	For J. Horan.
Unknown date	River Ettrick	Steamship	Messrs. Workman, Clarke & Co.	Belfast	United Kingdom	For James Little & Co.
Unknown date	Robert G. Ingersoll	Steamboat		East Portland, Oregon	United States	For Stephen B. Ives.
Unknown date	San Francisco	Steamship	Messrs. Murdoch & Murray	Port Glasgow	United Kingdom	For private owner.
Unknown date	Scottish Isles	Merchantman	Messrs. Potter & Sons	Liverpool	United Kingdom	For private owner.
Unknown date	Sea Fisher	Steamship	Messrs. MacIlwaine & Lewis	Belfast	United Kingdom	For private owner.
Unknown date	Shannon	Steam barge	W. Allsup & Sons	Preston	United Kingdom	For Arthur Guinness, Son & Co.
Unknown date	Sinares	Steamship	Palmer's Shipbuilding	Jarrow	United Kingdom	For J. Scott Bros.
Unknown date	Smeaton	Tender	W. Allsup & Sons	Preston	United Kingdom	For Great Western Railway.
Unknown date	Staithes	Merchantman	David Baxter & Co.	Sunderland	United Kingdom	For Palmers' Co. Limited.
Unknown date	Stokesley	Steamship	Messrs. R. Craggs & Sons.	Middlesbrough	United Kingdom	For .
Unknown date	Suffolk	Steamship		Blackwell	United Kingdom	For Suffolk Steamship Company.
Unknown date	Sunbeam	Schooner	Brundrit & Co.	Runcorn	United Kingdom	For J. Foulkes Jr.
Unknown date	Sussex	Steamship		Newcastle	United Kingdom	For Messrs. Hooper, Morrell and Williams.
Unknown date	TB 191	Torpedo boat	John I. Thornycroft & Company	Chiswick	United Kingdom	For Tasmanian Colonial Government.
Unknown date	Terpsichore	Merchantman	Messrs. Potter & Sons	Liverpool	United Kingdom	For private owner.
Unknown date	Tetartos	Steamship	Flensburger Schiffbau-Gesellschaft	Flensburg	Germany	For Flensburger Schiffbau-Gesellschaft.
Unknown date	Thisbe	Steamship	Joseph L. Thompson & Sons	Sunderland	United Kingdom	For Österreichischer Lloyd.
Unknown date	Thorndale	Steamship	James Laing	Sunderland	United Kingdom	For Dixon & Wilson.
Unknown date	Tilbury	Paddle steamer	J. & K. Smit	Kinderdijk	Netherlands	For London, Tilbury and Southend Railway.
Unknown date	The Brothers	Tug	Mr. Maxwell	South Shields	United Kingdom	For Messrs. J. Anderson & Co.
Unknown date	Titan	Steam yacht	W. Allsup & Sons	Preston	United Kingdom	For F. Arghalier.
Unknown date	Torbay	Merchantman	John Blumer & Company	Sunderland	United Kingdom	For Torbay Steamship Co.
Unknown date	Totomi Maru	Merchantman	Robert Thompson & Sons	Sunderland	United Kingdom	For Kiodo Unyu Kaisha.
Unknown date	Tourmaline	Steamship	Messrs. Richardson, Duck & Co	South Stockton	United Kingdom	For private owner.
Unknown date	Treherbert	Merchantman	William Pickersgill & Sons	Sunderland	United Kingdom	For Morel Bros. & Co.
Unknown date	Triano	Merchantman	Priestman & Co.	Sunderland	United Kingdom	For S. Sobrino, and/or M. de Taramona.
Unknown date	Troqueer	Steamship	Messrs. R. Irvine & Co.	West Hartlepool	United Kingdom	For private owner.
Unknown date	Urdaneta	Gunboat	Cavite Arsenal	Manila	(Spain) Spanish East Indies	For Spanish Navy.
Unknown date	Uriarte	Merchantman	Osbourne, Graham & Co.	Sunderland	United Kingdom	For F. de Carranaz & J. A. de Uriarte.
Unknown date	Umtata	Merchantman	William Doxford & Sons	Sunderland	United Kingdom	For Bullard, King & Co.
Unknown date	Utowana	Steam yacht	Delaware River Iron Ship Building and Engine Works	Chester, Pennsylvania	United States	For Washington Everett Connor.
Unknown date	Vagliano Brothers	Merchantman	Bartram, Haswell & Co.	Sunderland	United Kingdom	For Vagliano Bros.
Unknown date	Viking	Steam yacht	Delaware River Iron Ship Building and Engine Works	Chester, Pennsylvania	United Kingdom	For private owner.
Unknown date	Ville de Cadix	Merchantman	Robert Thompson & Sons	Sunderland	United Kingdom	For Compagnie Havraise Peninsulaire Navigation à Vapeur.
Unknown date	Ville de Metz	Merchantman	James Laing	Sunderland	United Kingdom	For Compagnie Havraise Peninsulaire Navigation à Vapeur.
Unknown date	Ville de Strasbourg	Merchantman	James Laing	Sunderland	United Kingdom	For Compagnie Havraise Peninsulaire Navigation à Vapeur.
Unknown date	Wally	Merchantman	The North of England Shipbuilding Company	Sunderland	United Kingdom	For F. Gordon.
Unknown date	Wandle	Steamship	Messrs. Edward Withy & Co.	West Hartlepool	United Kingdom	For private owner.
Unknown date	Warrego	Steamship	William Doxford & Sons	Sunderland	United Kingdom	For Queensland Steamship Company Ltd.
Unknown date	Watchful	Albacore-class gunboat	Messrs. Laird Bros.	Birkenhead	United Kingdom	For Royal Navy.
Unknown date	western Star	Merchantman	S. P. Austin & Son	Sunderland	United Kingdom	For Johnson Bros.
Unknown date	Wexford	Merchantman	William Doxford & Sons	Sunderland	United Kingdom	For R. M. Hudson.
Unknown date	Willingale	Merchantman	John Blumer and Company	Sunderland	United Kingdom	For A. Suart.
Unknown date	Wyvern	Steamship	Messrs. Richardson, Duck & Co	South Stockton	United Kingdom	For private owner.
Unknown date	Yare	Paddle tug	Beeching Brothers Ltd.	Great Yarmouth	United Kingdom	For Great Yarmouth Steam Tug Co. Ltd.
Unknown date	Zophar Mills	Fireboat			United States	For New York City Fire Department.
