= Waitemata =

Waitemata or Waitematā may refer to:

- Waitematā Harbour, the primary harbour of Auckland, New Zealand
- Waitematā railway station, the public transport hub in the central business district of Auckland, formerly Britomart Station
- Waitematā (local board area), a local government area in Auckland, New Zealand
  - Waitematā Local Board, a local board of Auckland Council, formed in 2010
  - Waitematā and Gulf Ward, a Ward of Auckland Council including the above local board
- Waitemata (ship), list of names of ships:
  - HMS Waitemata
- Waitemata City, a historical local government area, merged into Waitakere City in 1989
- Waitemata (New Zealand electorate), a historical electorate from 1871 to 1946, and from 1954 to 1978
- Waitemata AFC, a football club based in Waitemata City
- Waitemata Dolphins, a basketball team based in Auckland
- Waitemata County, a historical county of New Zealand that covered modern day West Auckland, North Shore, and Rodney District.
- Waitemata Group, a geologic group.
- Lodderia waitemata, a sea snail.
- Turbonilla waitemata, a sea snail.
- Waitemata District Health Board, a district health board.
