= HMS Poneke =

Colonial service Defender-class torpedo boat

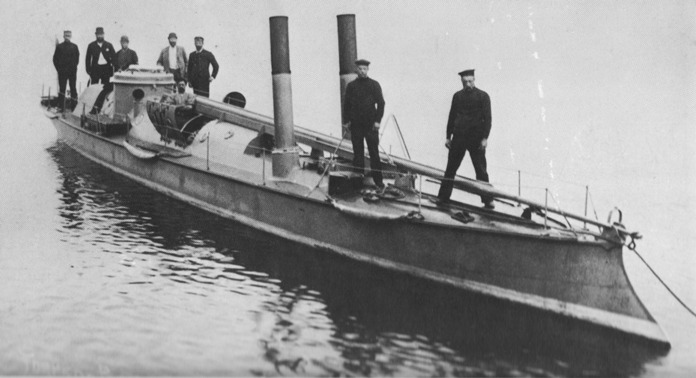
- A Defender-class torpedo boat, clearly showing the spar torpedo

History

United Kingdom
- Name: HMS Poneke
- Ordered: 26 August 1882
- Builder: John I. Thornycroft & Company
- Cost: £12,600 for four boats
- Yard number: 171
- Launched: 31 August 1883
- Commissioned: 18 September 1883

General characteristics
- Class & type: Defender-class torpedo boat
- Displacement: 12 tons
- Length: 62 ft 10 in (19.15 m)
- Beam: 7 ft 6 in (2.29 m)
- Installed power: 173 hp (129 kW)
- Propulsion: Two-cylinder compound-expansion steam reciprocating engine; 130lb/sq in Locomotive boiler,
- Speed: 17.3 kn (32.0 km/h)
- Complement: 7
- Armament: One McEvoy Spar torpedo; Two 18" Whitehead torpedoes; One 2-barrelled Nordenfelt gun

HMS Poneke was a colonial service Defender-class torpedo boat designed by Thornycroft & Company for the defence of New Zealand. It was one of four built at Chiswick in 1883 and shipped to New Zealand. Poneke (yard number 171) was allocated for service in Wellington.

The last two of the four torpedo boats (for Wellington and Auckland) were tested in September 1883. There were delays in arranging shipping and the two torpedo boats were eventually transported to Wellington as deck cargo on the sailing vessel Peter Stewart. They left in April 1884 and arrived in Wellington in late August.

On 29 October 1884, HMS Poneke undertook trials in Wellington Harbour along with the Auckland torpedo boat HMS Waitemata. In November, both of the torpedo boats were at a shipyard in Te Aro. The Wellington boat had suffered damage to a propellor. The Auckland torpedo boat HMS Waitemata was delivered to Auckland by being towed by steamship NZGSS Hinemoa, arriving in Auckland on 19 April 1885.

In April 1885, the Defence Department applied for consent for a slip and shed for the Wellington torpedo boat to be constructed alongside the Te Aro Baths. Practice runs were held with crew from the Wellington Naval Artillery in June 1885, and in September with crew from the Torpedo Corps. In June 1886, a naval demonstration was held in the harbour including a mock attack by the torpedo boat. Further demonstrations were held in October 1887.

In January 1897, the torpedo boat was used for towing an artillery target at high speed as part of training of naval artillery crew at Mahanga Bay in Wellington Harbour. In January 1898, the torpedo boat was reported as being in a neglected state at Mahanga Bay, with holes in its plates. In December, it was lifted from the water for transfer to a shipyard for repair of boiler and engines. Following repairs costing £300, sea trials showed that the maximum speed of the torpedo boat was 16 knots. The Defence Department declared the torpedo boat obsolete in March 1899.

The Wellington torpedo boat was eventually stripped of fittings and left to rust at Shelly Bay.

== Sources ==
- The New Zealand Maritime Index
- Lyon, David & Winfield, Rif (2004). The Sail and Steam Navy List: All the Ships of the Royal Navy 1815–1889. Chatham Publishing. ISBN 978-1-86176-032-6. OCLC 52620555.
