= Waitemata (ship) =

Waitemata has been the name of a number of ships:

- SS Waitemata (1908)
- SS Waitemata (1919)
- HMS Waitemata

== See also ==
- Waitemata (disambiguation), for topics of the same name.
