= Acheron-class torpedo boat =

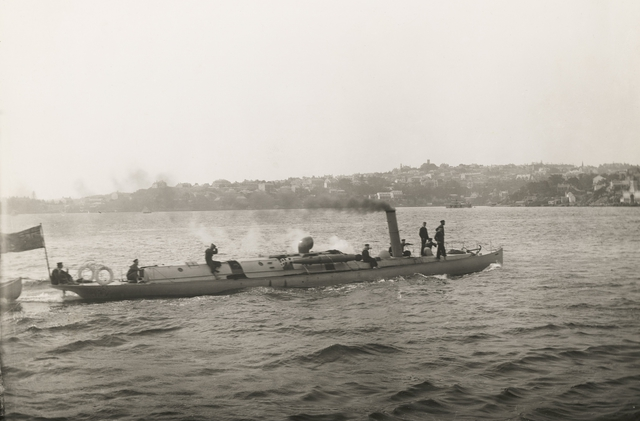
- Avernus

Class overview
- Builders: Atlas Engineering Company, Sydney
- Operators: New South Wales Naval Service
- Preceded by: None
- Succeeded by: Defender class
- Built: Early 1879
- Building: 2
- Scrapped: 2

General characteristics
- Displacement: 16 tons
- Length: 78 ft 0 in (23.77 m)
- Beam: 10 ft 3 in (3.12 m)
- Installed power: 200 ihp (150 kW)
- Propulsion: Surface condensing engines; Multi-tube boiler; Single screw
- Speed: 15 kn (28 km/h)
- Complement: 9
- Armament: As built: One spar torpedo; From 1887: Two 14-inch (360 mm) Whitehead torpedoes

The two colonial service Acheron-class torpedo boats were built by the Atlas Engineering Company at Sydney in 1879 for the New South Wales naval service. They were originally armed with a single spar torpedo, but this was replaced in 1887 with two 14-inch automotive torpedoes. They were sold in 1902.

== Design ==
The boats were designed by John I Thornycroft & Company to mount a single spar torpedo. They displaced a mere 16 tons and were 78 ft 0 in (23.77 m) in length.

== Construction ==
In 1877 the Government of the colony of New South Wales ordered the construction of two "outrigger" torpedo boats, in response to concerns about a possible threat from foreign warships. Tenders closed on 17 January 1878 and the winning contractor was the firm of Atlas Engineering Company at Sydney. Both vessels were launched in early 1879 and Acheron started her trials in Sydney Harbour on 1 March 1879.

The strange craft attracted much attention from the persons aboard the various yachts and steamers as she passed everything at a rate that made them seem to be comparatively standing still, even such boats and the Bellbird and Manly ferry steamers being relatively nowhere and being so small and low, the speed appears much greater than it would in a larger vessel

— Australian Town & Country Journal, 8 March 1879

== Service ==
Neither of the boats ever left the confines of Sydney Harbour, and they were never used in anger. By 1885 they were in a state of disrepair and were docked at the Cockatoo Island Dockyard. In the late 1880s they were described as "Sydney’s third line of defence", after the naval artillery and the defensive mines. Both boats were refitted again in 1896.

== Fates ==
On 1 March 1901 Acheron and Avernus became part of the Commonwealth Naval Forces. By this time they had become thoroughly outmoded and the Federal Government ordered their sale. In December 1902 Acheron was sold for £425 and Avernus for £502.

Acheron became Sydney's quarantine boat, renamed Jenner, and was paid off in the late 1930s. In the mid-1990s a workboat of the Royal Australian Navy detected a long thin hull with her side-scan sonar, which was thought to be the remains of Acheron. On the other hand, after sale Avernus was abandoned on the shores of Rushcutters Bay and in the 1940s was sunk for reclamation of land at Glebe.

Newspapers from 1922 and 1923 report a different fate for Avernus. Sold in 1902 and later acquired by an illegal German immigrant residing at Darling Point, Carl von Cosel Tanzler. He winched it into a large shed and in 1915 was attempting to modify it into the likeness of a submarine. Youths caught stealing from Tanzler's shed reported at Paddington Courthouse that Tanzler was hiding a submarine, yet Tanzler stated it was simply an old torpedo boat. When he re-launched the ageing modified Avernus in Double Bay, he was arrested and spent the duration of World War I at Trial Bay Gaol, then deported back to Europe. The modified Avernus washed aground on Double Bay beach and in 1923 it was loaded onto a barge and taken to the Datchett Street Balmain Wharf ship breakers where it was scrapped. At Balmain the wreck was viewed by an old gentleman who was one of the original builders of Avernus. The article incorrectly spells Avernus as Ibernus yet positively identifies it as either Acheron or her sister ship. An absurdly high conning tower had been fitted to Avernus prior to her abandonment. The modified wreck was described as a Jules Verne nightmare. Twenty years later the eccentric Carl Von Cosel Tanzler had migrated to America and claimed to be an ex-submarine commander.

== Ships ==
Name	Ship Builder	Launched	Fate
Acheron	Atlas Engineering Company	1879	Sold on 12 November 1902, transferred to NSW quarantine service, renamed Jenner. Paid off in the late 1930s
Avernus	Atlas Engineering Company	1879	Sold on 12 November 1902. Abandoned on the shores of Rushcutters Bay and sunk for reclamation of land at Glebe in the 1940s
