= HMS Taiaroa =

1883 Defender-class torpedo boat

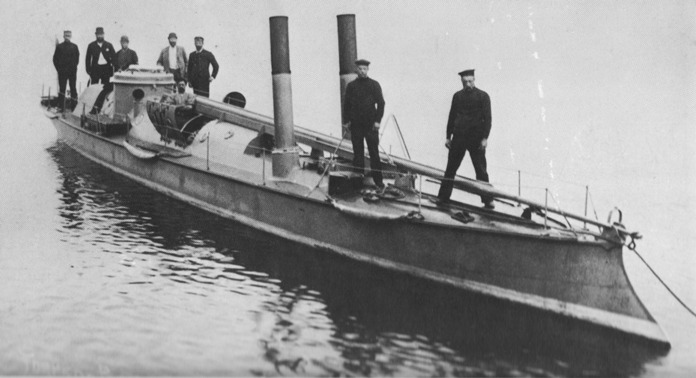
- A Defender-class torpedo boat, clearly showing the spar torpedo

History

United Kingdom
- Name: HMS Taiaroa
- Ordered: 26 August 1882
- Builder: John I. Thornycroft & Company
- Cost: £12,600 for four boats
- Yard number: 169
- Launched: 10 August 1883
- Commissioned: 19 September 1883
- Fate: Broken up

General characteristics
- Class & type: Defender-class torpedo boat
- Displacement: 12 tons
- Length: 62 ft 10 in (19.15 m)
- Beam: 7 ft 6 in (2.29 m)
- Installed power: 173 hp (129 kW)
- Propulsion: Two-cylinder compound-expansion steam reciprocating engine; 130lb/sq in Locomotive boiler,
- Speed: 17.2 kn (31.9 km/h)
- Complement: 7
- Armament: One McEvoy Spar torpedo (later augmented by two 18" Whitehead torpedoes); One 2-barrelled Nordenfelt gun

HMS Taiaroa was a colonial service Defender-class torpedo boat designed by Thornycroft & Company for the defence of New Zealand. She was named after Te Matenga Taiaroa, a 19th-century Māori chief of the Ngāi Tahu iwi. She was built at Chiswick in 1883 and shipped to New Zealand, where she was assigned to the defence of Port Chalmers.

== Service ==
On 1 February 1884 Defender and Taiaroa were shipped aboard the sailing ship Lyttelton from London to Port Chalmers, New Zealand. Taiaroa was sent to Deborah Bay, at Port Chalmers (port of the city of Dunedin), where a boat house was established for her.

She received a pair of 18-inch Whitehead torpedoes that had been fitted at build to her two sisters, Waitemata and Poneke. These had to be dropped together to avoid unbalancing the boat's narrow hull. All four boats of the class quickly became obsolete, and before 1900 had fallen out of use.

== Fate ==
After falling into disuse, she is believed to have been broken up. The mole built for the use of Taiaroa is now used as a pull-off carpark on the harbour road.

== Sources ==
- The New Zealand Maritime Index
- Lyon, David & Winfield, Rif (2004). The Sail and Steam Navy List: All the Ships of the Royal Navy 1815–1889. Chatham Publishing. ISBN 978-1-86176-032-6. OCLC 52620555.
