= Itata (1883) =

Iron barque

Coordinates: 33°48.913′S 151°13.481′E

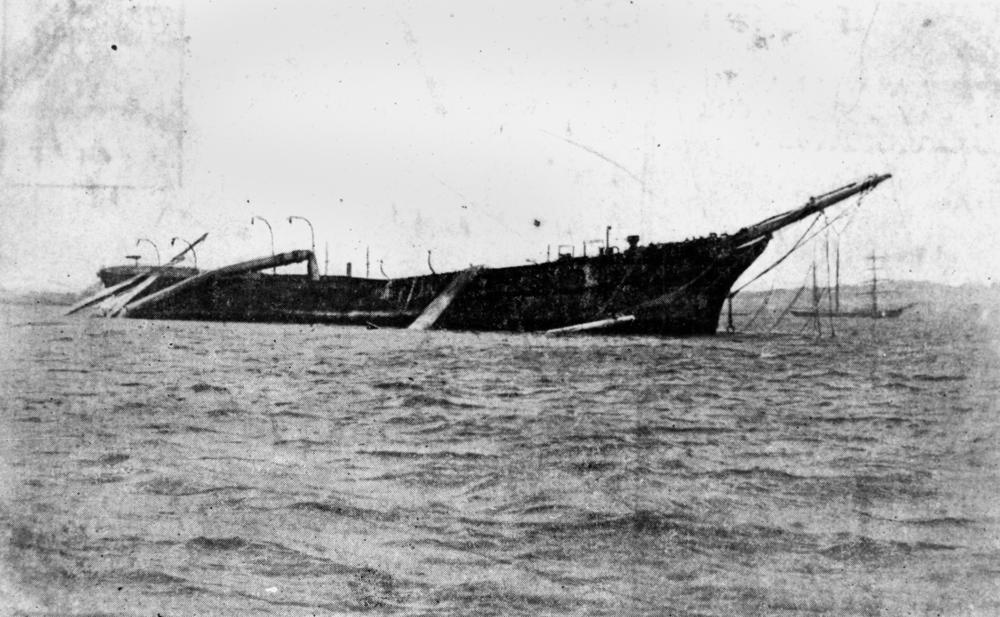
- The wreck of Itata.

History

United Kingdom
- Name: Itata
- Owner: Newark Shipping Company
- Port of registry: Liverpool
- Builder: R. & J. Evans, Liverpool
- Launched: 1883
- Identification: Official Number: 87910
- Fate: Scuttled in Middle Harbour.

General characteristics
- Tonnage: 950 Gross register tons, 975 Net register tons
- Length: 202.1 ft (61.6 m)
- Beam: 33 ft 6 in (10.21 m)
- Depth: 9.9 ft (3.0 m)
- Sail plan: Full-rigged ship

Itata was a three-masted iron barque built by R & J Evans, Liverpool in 1883. She was severely damaged by a fire in her hold at Newcastle, New South Wales, Australia, in 1906. Her hulk was towed to Sydney and was scuttled in Saltpan Creek, Middle Harbour.

The location is -33.8151031, 151.2246810

== Fate ==
While awaiting loading of one hold with coal alongside a wharf, she was severely damaged by fire at Newcastle, 12 January 1906 after another hold with a nitrate cargo caught fire. The resultant fire and explosions bowed and twisted her iron hull. She was towed to Sydney for use as a hulk, however was too badly damaged and was scuttled in Saltpan Creek, Middle Harbour.

Currently the Itata is often used as a training site for wreck diving dive courses.
