= Lucea Mason =

19th-century American steamboat

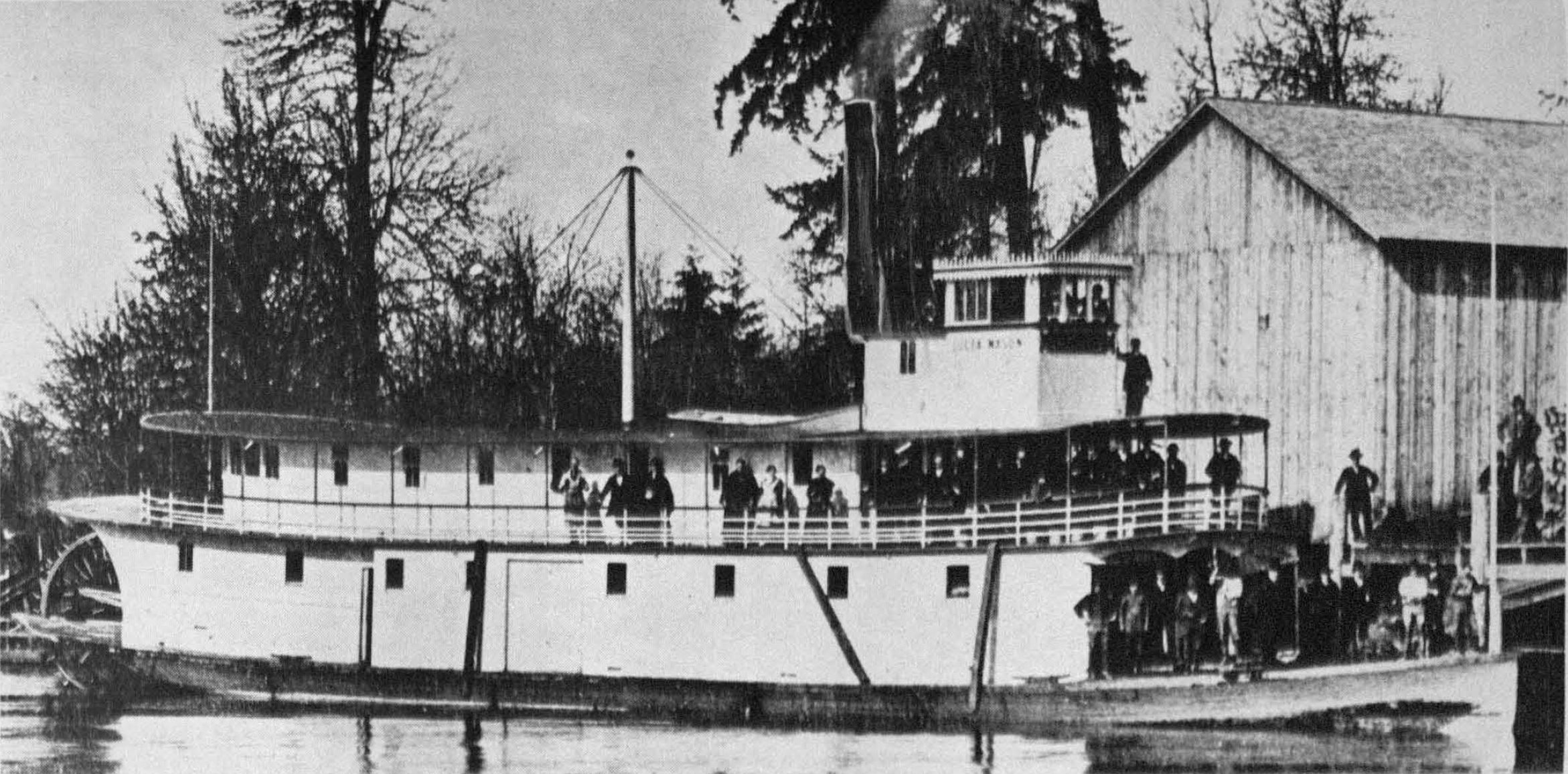
- Lucea Mason circa 1885.

History
- Name: Lucea Mason
- Route: Lewis, Columbia, and lower Willamette rivers.
- In service: 1883
- Out of service: 1891
- Identification: U.S. #140603
- Fate: Sank on the Lewis River

General characteristics
- Type: Inland all-purpose
- Tonnage: 178 GRT; 140 RT
- Length: 109 ft (33.22 m) exclusive of fantail
- Beam: 20 ft (6.10 m) exclusive of guards
- Depth: 4 ft 2.5 in (128.3 cm) depth of hold
- Installed power: twin steam engines, horizontally mounted: cylinder bore 11 in (28 cm); stroke 4 ft 0 in (122 cm), generating 8.3 nominal horsepower
- Propulsion: stern-wheel

Lucea Mason was a steamboat that operated from 1883 to 1891 on the Lewis, Columbia, and lower Willamette rivers. This vessel was occasionally referred to as the Lucia Mason. Lucea Mason was reported to have sunk a lot but nevertheless made a great deal of money for its owners.

== Construction ==
Lucea Mason was built in 1883 at St. Helens, Oregon by J.H. Peterson for the Farmers’ Transportation Company. Isaac Thomas was one of the principals behind the Farmers’ Transportation Company.

== Dimensions ==
Lucea Mason was 109 ft (33.22 m) long exclusive of the extension of the main deck over stern, called the fantail, on which the stern-wheel was mounted. The steamer had a beam of 20 ft (6.10 m) exclusive of the protective timbers along the upper outside of the hull called guards. The depth of hold was 4 ft 2.5 in (128.3 cm).

The overall size of the steamer was 178 gross tons, a unit of volume and not weight, and 140 registered tons. The official merchant vessel registry number was 140603.

Lucea Mason was capable of carrying 200 passengers on excursions, as it did on Sunday May 6, 1883 on a trip to La Center, W.T. However, in 1888, by law Lucea Mason was not allowed to carry more than 100 passengers.

== Engineering ==
Lucea Mason was driven by a stern-wheel turned by twin steam engines, horizontally mounted: cylinder bore 11 in (28 cm); stroke 4 ft 0 in (122 cm), generating 8.3 nominal horsepower.

== Career ==
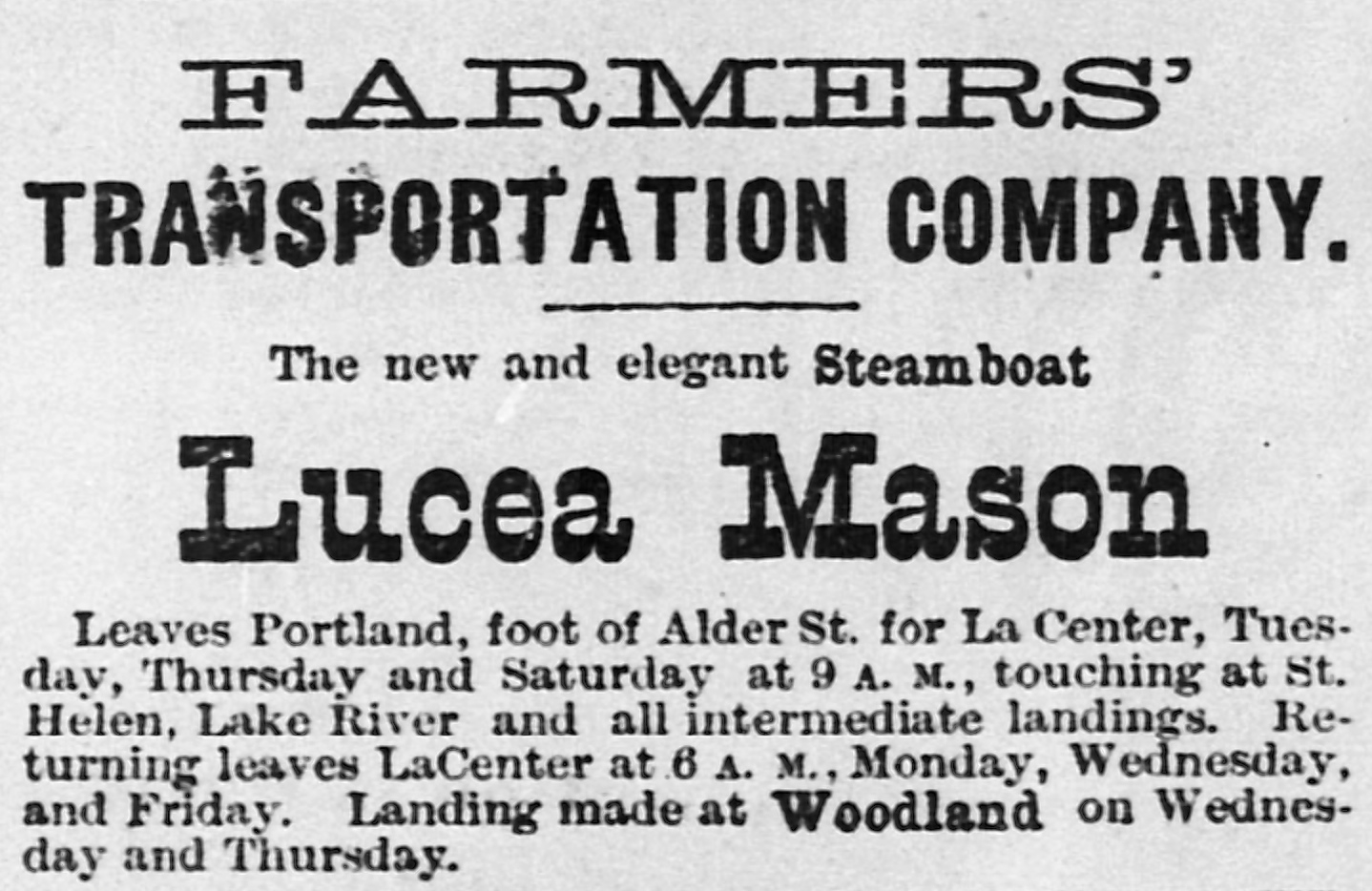
Advertisement for steamer Lucea Mason, placed in The Columbian, May 4, 1883.

Isaac Thomas acted as captain most of the time, and other times the role of master of the vessel was taken on by William G. Weir. Lovelace Pearne "L.P." Hosford was one of the officers of Lucea Mason.

=== Schedule ===
In May 1883, the "new and elegant" Lucea Mason was running from Portland, Oregon to La Center, W.T. on the following schedule: Depart Portland from the foot of Alder Street at 9:00 a.m. for La Center every Tuesday, Thursday, and Saturday, touching at St. Helens, Lake River and intermediate points; Returning to Portland, leaving La Center at 6:00 a.m. on Mondays, Wednesdays, and Fridays.

Landings were made at Woodland, Washington on Wednesday and Thursday. Lucea Mason remained a similar schedule until February 1886.

=== Excursions ===
In mid-May 1883, round trip excursion fare on Lucea Mason for a Sunday trip from La Center to Vancouver, W.T. via St. Helens was fifty cents on one occasion, and one dollar on another. At least one excursion was scheduled to run from La Center to Oregon City, Oregon on June 24, 1883, fare 75 cents round trip.

=== Collision with Dewdrop ===
On the afternoon Wednesday, October 8, 1884, Lucea Mason collided with the sternwheeler Dewdrop at the month of the Cowlitz River. Dewdrop, carrying a cargo of hay, sank to its deck level, but was reported to have sustained only slight damage.

=== Isabel paid off ===
In early 1887, the steamer Isabel was competing against Lucea Mason on the Lewis River. Isabel had the same legal limit for passengers, 100, as did Lucea Mason.

In early February, 1887, Isabel was withdrawn from the Lewis River route. A rumor was afoot that the owners of Lucea Mason had paid Isabel $400 to stay off the route.

=== 1888 snagging ===
At 7:00 a.m. on September 7, 1888, with Capt. Isaac Thomas in command, Lucea Mason hit a snag in the Lewis river and sank. The snag tore a hole in the hull about 40 feet long. Captain Thomas was able to beach the steamer in three feet of water, with the deck about 1.5 above the water level. There was no injury to the 8 or 10 passengers on board.

At this time both Lucea Mason and Isabel were owned by the Farmers’ Transportation Company. The total damage to Lucea Mason was about $1,000. While Lucea Mason was being repaired, its place on the Lewis River route would be taken by Isabel.

Lucea Mason was not insured against sinking, but only against fire. The reason for this was that insurance against sinking cost 7.5%.

Captain Thomas planned to have the cargo, which was uninsured, taken off Lucea Mason by Isabel, then to raise Lucea Mason and take it down to the Supple yard in Portland for repairs.

The snag in the river was familiar to Captain Thomas, and he described the reason for the accident as follows:

Well, it is one of those things that will happen with the most careful pilots. I knew the snag was there, and had seen it a hundred times; but it was a case of very close steering, and a mistake which is easy to make.

During its career, in addition to the Farmers’ Transportation Co., Lucea Mason came into the ownership of the Lewis and Lake Rivers Transportation Company, which was formed by farmers living along those rivers.

=== Produce for the Portland market ===
On February 25, 1889, Lucea Mason brought in from La Center to the Everding & Farrell dock at Portland, more hay than at any other time during the season in a single load. Lucea Mason, along with other steamers in the Cowlitz country, were bringing produce to Portland in large quantities.

=== Low water 1889 ===
In mid-July 1889 the Lewis River had fallen so low that Lucea Mason could not reach La Center.

== Disposition ==
Lucea Mason was wrecked on the Lewis River in 1891.
