= HMS Defender (1883) =

- Torpedo boat Defender

History

United Kingdom
- Name: HMS Defender
- Ordered: 26 August 1882
- Builder: John I. Thornycroft & Company
- Cost: £12,600 for four boats
- Yard number: 168
- Launched: 30 July 1883
- Commissioned: 18 September 1883
- Fate: Abandoned at Purau Bay, Lyttelton Harbour, New Zealand
- Status: Preserved at the Lyttelton Torpedo Boat Museum

General characteristics
- Class & type: Defender-class torpedo boat
- Displacement: 12 tons
- Length: 62 ft 10 in (19.15 m)
- Beam: 7 ft 6 in (2.29 m)
- Installed power: 173 hp (129 kW)
- Propulsion: Two-cylinder compound-expansion steam reciprocating engine; 130lb/sq in Locomotive boiler,
- Speed: 17.3 kn (32.0 km/h)
- Complement: 7
- Armament: One McEvoy Spar torpedo (later augmented by two 18" Whitehead torpedoes); One 2-barrelled Nordenfelt gun

HMS Defender was a second-class colonial-service torpedo boat built in 1883 for service in New Zealand and abandoned at Lyttelton sometime after 1900. Its remains are today displayed at the Lyttelton Torpedo Boat Museum.

== History ==
=== Acquisition ===
She was acquired, with 3 similar second-class torpedo boats, for the external defence of New Zealand, at a cost of about £3,200 each. All four boats were built and engined by John I. Thornycroft & Company at Church Wharf, Chiswick on the River Thames. Defender was launched on 30 July 1883 and was commissioned for trials on 18 September the same year.

As built she was armed with a single McEvoy spar torpedo, which was designed to be rammed into a vessel and explode beneath the waterline. A single 2-barrelled Nordenfelt machine gun comprised the total gun armament.

On 1 February 1884 they were shipped aboard the sailing ship Lyttelton from London to Port Chalmers, NZ. By December 1884 she had been towed to Lyttelton and on 1 January 1885 she made a great impression at her first public appearance at the Lyttelton Regatta.

=== Active career ===
A shed and slipway were built for her in Baker's Bay (now Magazine Bay) below Erskine Point, but enthusiasm seems to have been short-lived; she spent most of her time out of the water to preserve her galvanised hull.

In March 1886 Rear Admiral R A E Scott of Dunedin, honorary Commodore of the Naval Artillery Volunteers, arrived at Lyttelton in the course of a tour of inspection. Captain McLellan, the harbour master and commanding officer of the Lyttelton unit met him at the station and escorted him to where the torpedo boat was waiting, steamed up at Gladstone Pier. A trip was made round Ripa Island to observe the progress of the defence works and then on to Little Port Cooper. The trip was not a success; The Lyttelton Times describes the vessel's performance as "enough to make a marine engineer weep tears of gall!". Her engine was so rusty that only 12.5 knots (23 km/h) could be got out of her. The steam engines quickly used up all supplies of fresh water and the tanks had to be refilled with salt water, the boat proceeding slowly while this was done. The Lyttelton Times writer did not blame the Volunteers for this dreary performance but rather the inability of the Government to provide a full-time engineer to service her.

=== Laid up ===
She was laid up to rust in a shed a mile from the town in an exposed and totally unsuitable position. If there was any kind of swell it was impossible to launch the boat without the certainty of it being smashed. A torpedo corps was formed at Lyttelton soon after this and trained in the use of mines and little more was heard of the torpedo launch.

The spar torpedoes were replaced with Whitehead mobile torpedoes, which could be launched from the torpedo boats by means of dropping gear amidships. However the narrow hull remained stable only if both torpedoes were dropped simultaneously. There was no question of flotilla tactics, since the four harbours were too far apart. Rather, each boat was a single shot weapon, but integrated into the overall defence plan for each harbour.

=== Disposal and neglect ===
In 1900 the Naval and the Torpedo Corps were merged with the Garrison Artillery. The torpedo boat, by then thoroughly outmoded, was neglected and not replaced. When the Government later offered the vessel for sale it was bought for almost nothing by Mark Thomas, a well-known Lyttelton steam launch proprietor. He removed many parts and dumped the hull on the Purau beach. Her engines were given to the School of Engineering at University of Canterbury. For many years the rusty remains of Defender lay on the beach at Purau. The conning tower was eventually used in a nearby paddock as a watering trough, the steel plating, funnels, and deck fittings long since removed. Her ignominious end was the result of neglect and misuse from the time of her arrival at Lyttelton. In 1909 the Mt. Herbert County Council used a traction engine to pull the hull further up the shore but the whole thing broke in two during this operation. The rusty remains littered the beach until well after the Second World War. The local Borough Council eventually bulldozed what was left into a pit.

== Preservation ==
The bow and spar torpedo of Defender displayed at the Lyttelton Torpedo Boat Museum

In 1999 the remains were recovered, and now form part of the exhibition at the Lyttelton Torpedo Boat Museum. Housed in the Category 1 listed historic magazine building in Magazine Bay, the museum exhibits the remains of the hull, an engine and other artefacts.
