= Defender-class torpedo boat =

- Defender

Class overview
- Builders: John I. Thornycroft & Company at Chiswick
- Operators: Royal Navy
- Preceded by: Acheron-class torpedo boat
- Succeeded by: HMVS Childers
- Built: 1883
- Building: 4
- Scrapped: 4

General characteristics
- Displacement: 12 tons
- Length: 62 ft 10 in (19.15 m)
- Beam: 7 ft 6 in (2.29 m)
- Installed power: 173 hp (129 kW)
- Propulsion: Two-cylinder inverted compound-expansion steam reciprocating engine; 130lb/sq in Locomotive boiler,
- Speed: 17.5 kn (32.4 km/h)
- Complement: 7
- Armament: One McEvoy Spar torpedo; Two 18" Whitehead torpedoes (retrofitted to Defender & Taiaroa); One 2-barrelled Nordenfelt gun

The colonial service Defender-class torpedo boats were designed by Thornycroft & Company for the defence of New Zealand, built at Chiswick in 1883 and shipped to New Zealand. They were quickly obsolete and were left to deteriorate in situ. The remains of the lead vessel in the class, Defender, are preserved at the Lyttelton Torpedo Boat Museum.

== Construction ==
Acquired for the external defence of New Zealand, at a cost of about £3,200 each, all four boats were built and engined by John I. Thornycroft & Company at Church Wharf, Chiswick on the River Thames.

== Armament ==
As built the class was armed with a single McEvoy spar torpedo, which was designed to be rammed into a vessel and explode beneath the waterline. A single 2-barrelled Nordenfelt gun comprised the total gun armament. The last pair had 18-inch Whitehead torpedoes fitted at build, and these were later retrofitted to Defender and Taiaroa.

== Transport to New Zealand ==
On 1 February 1884 the first pair were shipped aboard the sailing ship Lyttelton from London to Port Chalmers, New Zealand. The second pair followed on 3 May 1884.

== Operational lives ==
Torpedo Corps units of the Permanent Militia were formed to operate the boats at the four main ports of Lyttelton (Defender), Port Chalmers (Taiaroa), Devonport (Waitemata) and Wellington (Poneke), each with its boatshed and slipway. The boats quickly became obsolete and by 1900 had largely been left to rot.

== Ships ==
| Name | Ship Builder | Launched | Fate |
|---|---|---|---|
| Defender | Thornycroft & Company, Chiswick | 30 July 1883 | Abandoned at Purau Bay, Lyttelton Harbour and later preserved at the Lyttelton Torpedo Boat Museum |
| Taiaroa | Thornycroft & Company, Chiswick | 10 August 1883 | |
| Waitemata | Thornycroft & Company, Chiswick | 30 August 1883 | |
| Poneke | Thornycroft & Company, Chiswick | 31 August 1883 | |

== See also ==
- Early naval vessels of New Zealand

== Sources ==
- The New Zealand Maritime Index
- Lyon, David & Winfield, Rif (2004). The Sail and Steam Navy List: All the Ships of the Royal Navy 1815–1889. Chatham Publishing. ISBN 978-1-86176-032-6. OCLC 52620555.
