= HMS Waitemata =

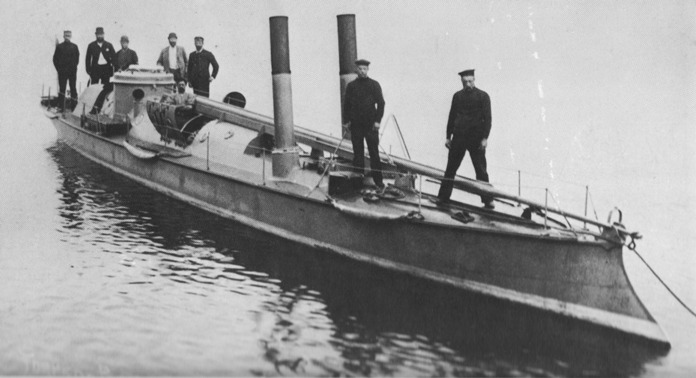
- A Defender-class torpedo boat, clearly showing the spar torpedo

History

United Kingdom
- Name: HMS Waitemata
- Ordered: 26 August 1882
- Builder: John I. Thornycroft & Company
- Cost: £12,600 for four boats
- Yard number: 170
- Launched: 30 August 1883
- Commissioned: 19 September 1883

General characteristics
- Class & type: Defender-class torpedo boat
- Displacement: 12 tons
- Length: 62 ft 10 in (19.15 m)
- Beam: 7 ft 6 in (2.29 m)
- Installed power: 173 hp (129 kW)
- Propulsion: Two-cylinder compound-expansion steam reciprocating engine; 130lb/sq in Locomotive boiler,
- Speed: 17.3 kn (32.0 km/h)
- Complement: 7
- Armament: One McEvoy Spar torpedo; Two 18" Whitehead torpedoes; One 2-barrelled Nordenfelt gun

HMS Waitemata was a colonial service Defender-class torpedo boat designed by Thornycroft & Company for the defence of New Zealand, built at Chiswick in 1883 and shipped to New Zealand.

The torpedo boat was delivered from Wellington to Auckland by being towed behind the Government steamship NZGSS Hinemoa. It arrived in Auckland in April 1885.

== Sources ==
- The New Zealand Maritime Index
- Lyon, David & Winfield, Rif (2004). The Sail and Steam Navy List: All the Ships of the Royal Navy 1815–1889. Chatham Publishing. ISBN 978-1-86176-032-6. OCLC 52620555.
