= Baltic Fleet (United Kingdom) =

- Ensign of the British Baltic Fleet March–August 1854
- Active: 1658-1856
- Country: United Kingdom
- Branch: Royal Navy
- Type: Fleet
- Part of: Royal Navy
- Garrison/HQ: Spithead, Hampshire, England

Commanders
- Notable commanders: Vice-Admiral James Saumarez

The Baltic Fleet, also known as the Baltic Squadron, were a series of formations of the British Royal Navy which existed between 1658 and 1856. They consisted of ships assembled at Spithead, a naval anchorage in the English Channel, for various naval operations in the Baltic Sea. The formations were under the ultimate command of the Commander-in-Chief, Baltic Fleet.

== Overview ==
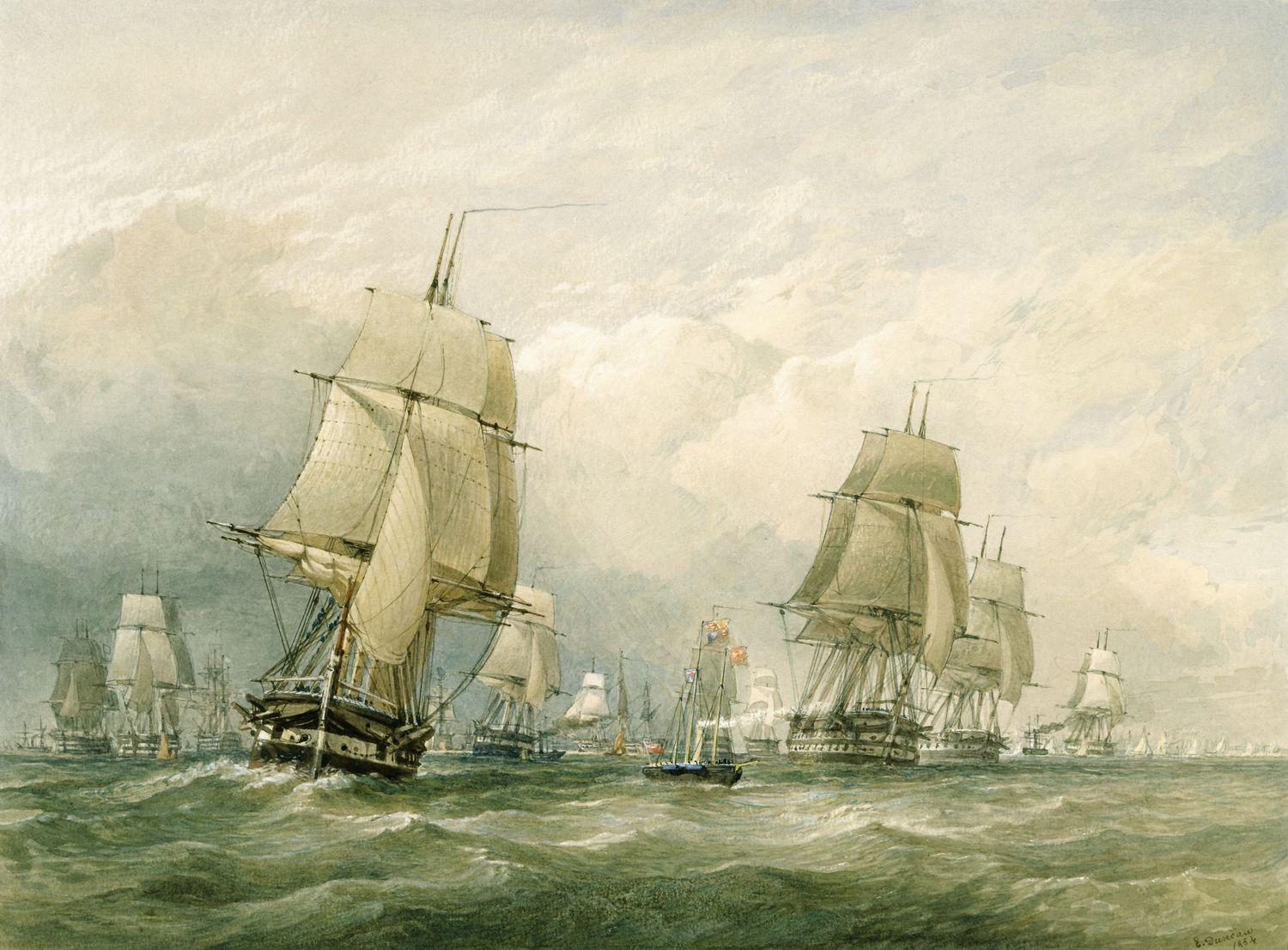
The Baltic fleet sailing from Spithead, 11 March 1854

The Baltic Fleet comprised a series of temporary fleets assembled for various naval campaigns of the Royal Navy from 1658 to 1854 under the command of a Commander-in-Chief, Baltic Fleet. The fleet operated from a number of bases including Spithead in Hampshire but also the Nore. During the Crimean War of 1853–1856, the final Baltic Fleet was the largest assembled since the Napoleonic Wars, and in terms of armament the most powerful naval force the Royal Navy possessed in the mid-19th century. Pictured right is the fleet sailing from Spithead on 11 March 1854.

== History ==
In November 1658 Vice-Admiral William Goodsonn was appointed to command the English Baltic Fleet of twenty ships – he was transporting General at sea Sir George Ayscue, who was being loaned to Sweden to assist in their naval operations against Denmark and the Dutch during the Dano-Swedish War (1658–1660).

In 1715 Sir John Norris was sent with a fleet to the Baltic Sea to support a coalition of naval forces from Russia, Denmark and Hanover taking part in the Great Northern War of 1700–1721 against Sweden. Tsar Peter of Russia took personal command of the coalition fleet and appointed Norris as his deputy in 1716: together they protected British and other allied merchant vessels from attack by warships of the Swedish Empire.

In 1717 the Baltic fleet formed again – this time under the command of Sir George Byng. It set out for the Baltic following information received by the Admiralty that Charles XII of Sweden was meditating a new movement in support of the exiled Stuarts. The Danish admiral Peter Raben in his flagship Printz Christian received orders from the Danish admiralty in June 1717 to work fully with the British admiral.

Following the death of Charles XII of Sweden on 30 November 1718 O.S., Admiral Sir John Norris returned to the region as Commander-in-Chief of the Baltic Fleet to protect British merchant shipping from attack by Russian raiders.

In 1726 Sir Charles Wager was appointed to take command of a large battle fleet sent to the Baltic to protect Sweden and Denmark from the threat of a recently mobilized Russian fleet. Stopping first at Copenhagen, he met with the court and completed arrangements for co-operation with the Danish navy. Wager took his twenty ships of the line to Reval (in present-day Estonia). He had orders to engage and destroy the Russian fleet if it came out. To reassure Sweden, the combined fleet stayed at Reval all summer. The British fleet arrived back in Britain on 1 November 1726. but actually lifted the blockade on 1 October (Note: The Danish Admiral reported on 22 October 1726 from Danzig that the combined fleet had lifted the blockade of Reval on 1 October. Battered by October storms, short of water and provisions, the Danish squadron was in poor condition and there was scurvy and chest infections on board the ships. 215 Danes had died on the Reval expedition, even without enemy action.)

In 1801 Sir Hyde Parker was appointed to command the Baltic Fleet destined to break up the northern armed neutrality (Denmark–Norway, Prussia, Sweden, and Russia), with Vice-Admiral Horatio Nelson as his second-in-command. Copenhagen, the first objective of the expedition, fell in the Battle of Copenhagen on 2 April 1801.

In 1808 Rear-Admiral Sir James Saumarez was given command of the British Baltic fleet with his flag in HMS Victory. His mission involved protecting the British trade interests that were of vital importance for Royal Navy supplies (naval stores and timber), in addition to blockading enemy ports such as those under French control in northern Germany. The Russian fleet was also kept under blockade until Alexander I reopened Russian ports. In 1812 Napoleon invaded Russia – the Baltic fleet succeeded in obstructing French operations.

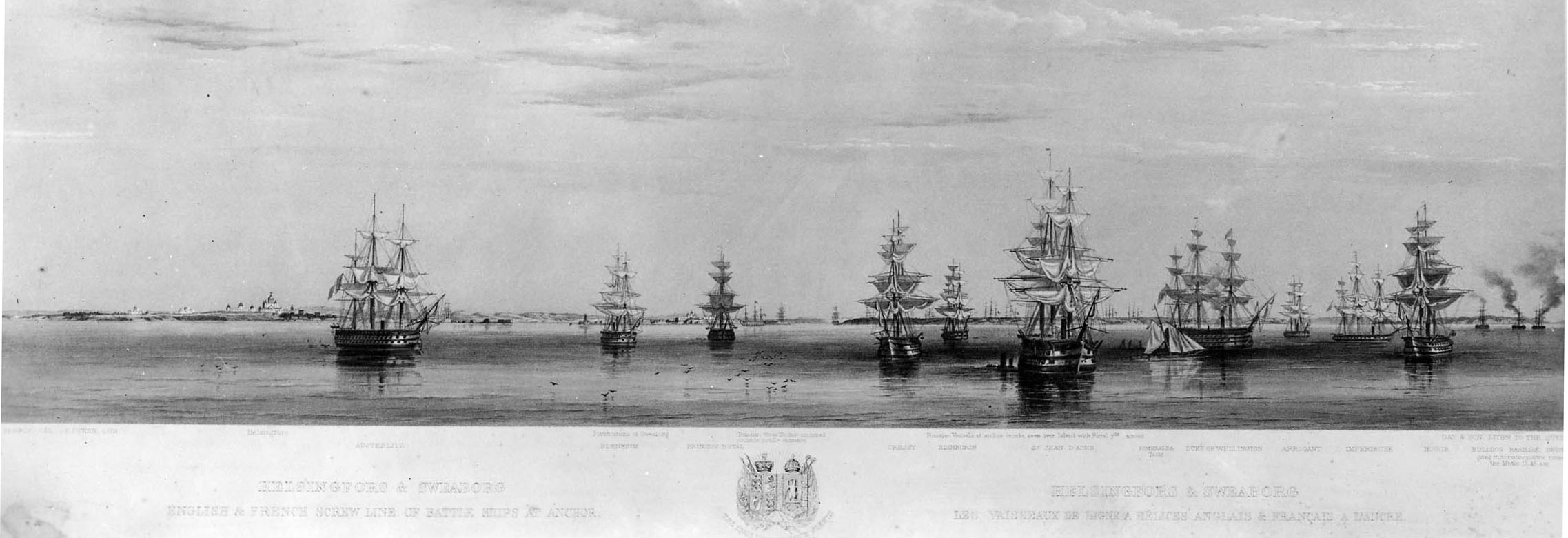
The fleet in the Baltic, 1854

In February 1854 Rear-Admiral Sir Charles Napier was appointed to command the Baltic Fleet. It sailed on 11 March for an expedition to the Baltic to attack the fortresses at Kronstadt and Sveaborg. Napier reported back to the Admiralty that despite his attempts the fortresses were impregnable – he was relieved of his command in December 1854.

On 20 March 1854, Vice-Admiral James Dundas taking command of the fleet stationed at Spithead, Hampshire, it proceeded to the Baltic Sea where it was employed on blockading duties to prevent Russia from receiving supplies at its Baltic ports until 13 August 1854.

On 27 June 1855 the fleet was stationed at Spithead under the command of Rear-Admiral Richard Dundas. The very large force consisted of some 93 naval units in total, as reported in the Melbourne Argus newspaper at the time.

== In command ==
Post holders included:

Commander-in-Chief, Baltic Fleet
rank	name	date/s	notes	ref
Vice-Admiral	Sir William Goodsonn	1658-1659		
Admiral	Edward Montagu, 1st Earl of Sandwich	1659	in command as General at Sea	
Admiral	Sir John Norris	1715–1716		
Admiral	Sir George Byng	1717		
Admiral	Sir John Norris	1718-1725	second appointment	
Vice-Admiral	Sir Charles Wager	1726		
Admiral	Sir John Norris	1727	third appointment	
Admiral	Sir Hyde Parker	1801		
Vice-Admiral	James Saumarez	1808-1812		
Vice-Admiral	Charles Napier	February – March, 1854		
Vice-Admiral	James Dundas	March, – August, 1854		
Rear-Admiral	Richard Dundas	February, 1855 – April 1856		

== Composition of the fleet 1855 ==
As of 27 June 1855:

Composition of the Baltic Fleet June 1855
#	rate	ships	notes	ref
1.	First-rate	HMS Duke of Wellington	Flag Ship, 131 guns	
2.	First-rate	HMS Royal George	120 guns newspaper report gives 102 guns	
3.	Second-rate	HMS Exmouth	91 guns	
4.	Second-rate	HMS James Watt	steam- and sail-powered, 91 guns	
5.	Second-rate	HMS Orion	91 guns	
6.	Second-rate	HMS Caesar	launched 1853, 91 guns	
7.	Second-rate	HMS Nile	90 guns	
8.	Second-rate	HMS Majestic	81 guns	
9.	Second-rate	HMS Colossus	80 guns	
10.	Second-rate	HMS Sans Pareil	70 guns	
11.	Third-rate	HMS Cressy (1853)	launched 1853, screw propelled, 80 guns	
12.	Third-rate	HMS Blenheim	74 guns	
13.	Third-rate	HMS La Hogue	74 guns source gives 60 guns	
14.	Third-rate	HMS Ajax	ditto	
15.	Third-rate	HMS Hastings	ditto	
16.	Third-rate	HMS Pembroke	60 guns	
17.	Third-rate	HMS Cornwallis	60 guns	
18.	Third-rate	HMS Hawke	60 guns	
19.	Third-rate	HMS Russell	74 guns, source gives 60 guns	
20.	Third-rate	HMS Edinburgh	74 guns, source gives 58 guns	
21.	Fourth-rate	HMS Euryalus	screw frigate, 51 guns	
22.	Steam frigate	HMS Imperieuse	51 guns	
23.	Frigate	HMS Arrogant	46 guns	
24.	Frigate	HMS Amphion	36 guns, source gives 34 guns	
25.	Frigate	HMS Horatio	steam frigate, 24 guns	
26.	Sloop-of-war	HMS Malacca	17 guns	
27.	Corvette	HMS Cossack	wooden screw, 20 guns	
28.	Corvette	HMS Tartar	20 guns	
29.	Corvette	HMS Pylades	wooden screw, 20 guns	
30.	Corvette	HMS Esk	21 guns source gives 20 guns	
31.	Screw sloop	HMS Archer	15 guns	
32.	Paddle frigate	HMS Magicienne	steam powered, 16 guns	
33.	Paddle frigate	HMS Odin	ditto	
34.	Paddle frigate	HMS Vulture	6 guns	
35.	Paddle frigate	HMS Centaur	6 guns	
36.	Paddle frigate	HMS Dragon	6 guns	
37.	Paddle sloop	HMS Bulldog	6 guns	
38.	Paddle steamer	HMS Lightning	3 guns	
39.	Screw sloop	HMS Desperate	8 guns	
40.	Screw sloop	HMS Conflict	8 guns	
41.	Screw sloop	HMS Cruizer	17 guns, source gives 15 guns as HMS Cruiser	
42.	Screw sloop	HMS Harrier	17 guns, source gives 15 guns	
43.	Screw sloop	HMS Falcon	ditto	
44.	Screw sloop	HMS Ariel	9 guns	
45.	Paddle sloop	HMS Basilisk	6 guns	
46.	Steam sloop	HMS Rosamond	6 guns	
47.	Paddle sloop	HMS Driver	6 guns	
48.	Paddle sloop	HMS Geyser	6 guns	
49	Paddle sloop	HMS Gorgon	6 guns	
Ironclad floating batteries total 5
1.	Aetna-class	HMS Glatton	16 guns	
2.	Aetna-class	HMS Meteor	16 guns	
3.	Aetna-class	HMS Aetna	16 guns	
4.	Aetna-class	HMS Thunder	16 guns	
5.	Aetna-class	HMS Trusty	16 guns	
Mortar vessels total 28
8	Bomb vessels	Blazer, Firm, Manly, Mastiff, Hardy, Havock, Porcupine, Porpoise.	All built between 1854 and 1855, 1 gun each	
10	Gunboats	Gleaner, Pelter, Ruby, Pincher, Teazer, Badger, Snaper, Biter, Boxer, Clinker	Between 2 and 3 guns each	
10	Gunboats	Cracker, Dapper, Fancy, Grinder, Snap, Jackdaw, Jasper, Jack, Magpie, Redwing	Between 2 and 3 guns each	
Gunboats total 8
8	Gunboats	Skylark, Hind, Starling, Stork, Twinger, Thistle, Weasel, Pigmy	Between 2 and 3 guns each	
Other vessels/units total 3
1.	Hospital ship	HMS Belleisle		
1.	Shell magazine	Aeolus		
1.	Powder magazine	Volage		
The fleet consisted of 93 naval units of all types

== Bibliography ==
1. Callo, Joseph F.; Wilson, Alastair (2004). Who's Who in Naval History: From 1550 to the present. Cambridge, London: Routledge. ISBN 9781134395408.
2. Campbell, John; Kent, John (1785). Biographia Nautica: Or, Memoirs of Those Illustrious Seamen, to Whose Intrepidity and Conduct the English are Indebted, for the Victories of Their Fleets, the Increase of Their Dominions, the Extension of Their Commerce, and Their Preeminence on the Ocean. Interspersed with the Most Material Circumstances of Naval History, from the Norman Invasion to the Year 1779. Embellished with Copper-plates. Dublin, Ireland: J. Williams.
3. Campbell, John (1814). Lives of the British Admirals: Containing Also a New and Accurate Naval History, from the Earliest Periods. London, England: C. J. Barrinton.
4. Grehan, John; Mace, Martin (2014). "VIII British Battles of the Crimean Wars 1854 to 1855". British Battles of the Crimean Wars 1854–1856: Despatches from the Front. Barnsley, England: Pen and Sword. ISBN 9781473831858.
5. Harrison, Simon (2010–2018). "Three Decks – Warships in the Age of Sail: Fleet lists 1553 to 1821". threedecks.org. S. Harrison.
6. Hore, Captain Peter (2015). "James Saumarez". Nelson's Band of Brothers. Barnsley, England: Seaforth Publishing. ISBN 9781848323568.
7. Grainger, John D. (2014). The British Navy in the Baltic. Woodbridge, England: Boydell & Brewer Ltd. ISBN 9781843839477.
8. Heathcoate, Tony (2002). British admirals of the fleet 1734–1995 : a biographical dictionary. Barnsley: Pen and Sword. ISBN 0850528356.
9. Heathcoate, Tony (2005). Nelson's Trafalgar captains and their battles. Barnsley, England: Pen & Sword Maritime. ISBN 1844151824.
10. Laughton, John Knox. "Byng George". Dictionary of National Biography, 1885–1900. London, England: Smith, Elder and Co.
11. Laughton, John Knox. (1885–1900). "Parker Hyde (1739–1807)". Dictionary of National Biography, London, England: Smith, Elder & Co.
12. Lavery, Brian (2015). Nelson's Victory: 250 Years of War and Peace. Barnsley, England: Seaforth Publishing. ISBN 9781848322325.
13. Richards, Donald (2006). Conflict in the Crimea: British Redcoats on Russian Soil. Barnsley, England: Pen and Sword. ISBN 9781844153435.
14. Williams, Chris (2006). A Companion to Nineteenth-Century Britain. Hoboken, New Jersey, United States: John Wiley & Sons. ISBN 9781405156790.

== Danish source ==
- (in Danish)T. A. Topsøe-Jensen og Emil Marquard (1935) “Officerer i den dansk-norske Søetat 1660–1814 og den danske Søetat 1814–1932" (Danish Naval Officers). Two volumes (downloadable here).
