= List of ship launches in 1842 =

The list of ship launches in 1842 includes a chronological list of some ships launched in 1842.

Date	Ship	Class	Builder	Location	Country	Notes
3 January	Brahmin	East Indiaman	John Scott & Sons	Greenock	United Kingdom	For private owner.
11 January	Nairns	Brig	J. W. Wilkinson	Newcastle upon Tyne	United Kingdom	For Messrs. Henry & Philip Nairn.
13 January	Thunderbolt	Driver-class sloop		Portsmouth Dockyard	United Kingdom	For Royal Navy.
17 January	Bentinck	Steamship		Liverpool	United Kingdom	For P&O.
25 January	Prince of Wales	Steamship		Neath Abbey	United Kingdom	For private owner.
28 January	Avon	Steamship	Messrs. Aeramann, Morgan, and Co.	Bristol	United Kingdom	For West India Royal Mail Steam Packet Company.
29 January	Glentanar	Clipper	A. Hall & Co.	Aberdeen	United Kingdom	For Yule & Co.
29 January	Newcastle	Schooner	Messrs. Duthie	Aberdeen	United Kingdom	For Mr. Leslie.
29 January	Seaton	Barque	Walter Hood & Co.	Aberdeen	United Kingdom	For private owners.
31 January	Queen of the Isles	Barque	A. Hall & Co.	Aberdeen	United Kingdom	For private owners.
31 January	Topaz	Schooner	John Scott & Sons	Greenock	United Kingdom	For private owner.
January	Bowling	Barque		Bowling	United Kingdom	For private owner.
January	Prince of Wales	Merchantman	Johnson	Bideford	United Kingdom	For private owner.
January	Yar	Merchantman	E. Dixon	Sunderland	United Kingdom	For Squires & Co.
10 February	King Orry	Paddle steamer	J.Winram.	Douglas	Isle of Man	For Isle of Man Steam Packet Company.
26 February	Ellenborough	Merchantman	Messrs. Smith's	Newcastle upon Tyne	United Kingdom	For private owner.
26 February	Semiramis	Frigate		Bombay	India	For British East India Company.
26 February	Viscount Sandon	Full-rigged ship	Joseph Steel	Liverpool	United Kingdom	For Messrs. Taylor, Potter & Co.
28 February	Bee	Paddle steamer		Chatham Dockyard	United Kingdom	For Royal Navy.
5 March	Zoe	Merchantman	Goldie	Singapore	(United Kingdom of Great Britain and Ireland) Straits Settlements	For private owner.
24 March	Spiteful	Driver-class sloop		Pembroke Dockyard	United Kingdom	For Royal Navy.
28 March	Philomel	Alert-class brig		Devonport Dockyard	United Kingdom	For Royal Navy.
28 March	Severn	Steamship	Aeramann, Morgan & Co.	Bedminster	United Kingdom	For private owner.
29 March	Albatross	Acorn-class brig-sloop		Portsmouth Dockyard	United Kingdom	For Royal Navy.
29 March	Cormorant	Driver-class sloop		Sheerness Dockyard	United Kingdom	For Royal Navy.
March	Glide	Snow	T. Stothard	Sunderland	United Kingdom	For John Meldrum & Sherinton Foster.
March	William Packet	Snow	John Ray & John Riseborough	Sunderland	United Kingdom	For Barber & Co.
9 April	Rose	Steamship	Messrs. George Lunnell & Company	Hotwells	United Kingdom	For private owner.
11 April	Laura Ann	Schooner	William Bayley & Co.	Ipswich	United Kingdom	For Isiah Richmond.
12 April	Guadeloupe	Paddle frigate	Johnathan Laird	Birkenhead	United Kingdom	For Mexican Navy.
12 April	Zephyr	Schooner	Samuel Hall	East Boston, Massachusetts	United States	For Russell & Company.
16 April	Somers	Brig		New York Navy Yard	United States	For United States Navy.
16 April	Truxtun	Brig		Gosport Navy Yard	United States	For United States Navy.
25 April	Eliza Brindley	Schooner	William Jones	Aihfawr	United Kingdom	For private owner.
26 April	Bainbridge	Brig		Boston Navy Yard	United States	For United States Navy.
26 April	Betsey	Schooner	Messrs. M. & D. Cherry	Hull	United Kingdom	For Messrs. Robert Kiddey & Co.
26 April	Gwen Evans	Barque	Robert Evans	Gadlys	United Kingdom	For private owner.
26 April	Hindostan	Steamship	Messrs. Wilson & Co.	Liverpool	United Kingdom	For P&O.
26 April	John Thomas	Schooner	Richard A. Pritchard	Glan-y-don	United Kingdom	For private owner.
26 April	Oriental Queen	East Indiaman	Hickson	Cork	United Kingdom	For private owner.
5 May	Savannah	Frigate		New York Navy Yard	United States	For United States Navy.
11 May	John Gibson	Brig	John Gibson	Hull	United Kingdom	For private owner.
11 May	Lady Buller	Schooner	William Bonker	Salcombe	United Kingdom	For Beer & Co.
14 May	Berwick Castle	Barque	Gowan	Berwick upon Tweed	United Kingdom	For private owner.
24 May	Cumberland	Raritan-class frigate		Boston Navy Yard	United States	For United States Navy.
24 May	Ingermanland	Iezekiil‘-class ship of the line	Solombalskaya Shipyard	Arkhangelsk	United Kingdom	For Imperial Russian Navy.
25 May	Mercure	Brig	Hippolyte Louis Edouard Prétot	Brest	France	For French Navy.
May	Ann	Brigantine	J. H. Robson	Sunderland	United Kingdom	For J. H. Robson.
8 June	Taleisin	Steamship			United Kingdom	For private owner.
23 June	Génie	Génie-class brig		Brest	France	For French Navy.
June	Protemelia	Merchantman	T. Young	South Shields	United Kingdom	For private owner.
7 July	Labrador	Steamship		Toulon	France	For private owner.
9 July	Prince of Wales	East Indiaman	Messrs. Green, Wigram & Green	Blackwall	United Kingdom	For private owner.
11 July	Jane and Esther	Brig	Speakman	Marsh End	United Kingdom	For Messrs. William and John Humber.
21 July	Queen	East Indiaman	Messrs. Green, Wigram & Green	Blackwall	United Kingdom	For private owner.
23 July	Great Northern	Steamship	Coppin	Londonderry	United Kingdom	For private owner.
23 July	Estafette	Iris-class schooner		Brest	France	For French Navy.
25 July	Goliath	Vanguard-class ship of the line		Chatham Dockyard	United Kingdom	For Royal Navy.
25 July	Virago	Driver-class sloop		Chatham Dockyard	United Kingdom	For Royal Navy.
26 July	Saratoga	Sloop-of-war		Portsmouth Navy Yard	United States	For United States Navy.
26 July	Varna	Sultan Makhmud-class ship of the line	I. D. Vorobyov	Nicholaieff	Russia	For Imperial Russian Navy.
July	Bulwark	Brigantine		Londonderry	(United Kingdom of Great Britain and Ireland) Colony of Nova Scotia	For private owner.
July	China	Merchantman	H. & G. Barrick	Whitby	United Kingdom	For private owner.
July	Ruby	Paddle steamer / target ship	Acramans, Morgan & Co.	Bristol	United Kingdom	For Admiralty.
10 August	Ulloa	Steam frigate		Cherbourg	France	For French Navy.
23 August	Frolic	Frolic-class brig		Portsmouth Dockyard	United Kingdom	For Royal Navy.
29 August	Lady Anne Wynne	Brig		Sligo	United Kingdom	For William Kernaghan.
August	Cambridge	Merchantman	J. Storey	Sunderland	United Kingdom	For J. Storey.
August	Ceylon	Barque		Saint John	(United Kingdom of Great Britain and Ireland) Colony of New Brunswick	For private owner.
4 September	Diamond	Barque		Prince Edward Islands	(United Kingdom of Great Britain and Ireland) Colony of Prince Edward Island	For private owner.
5 September	Cuvier	Steamship		Lorient	France	For French Navy.
6 September	Albion	Albion-class ship of the line		Plymouth Dockyard	United Kingdom	For Royal Navy.
6 September	Firebrand	Cyclops-class frigate		Portsmouth Dockyard	United Kingdom	For Royal Navy.
6 September	Superb	Vanguard-class ship of the line		Pembroke Dockyard	United Kingdom	For Royal Navy.
8 September	Hibernia	Steamship	Messrs. R. Steele & Co.	Greenock	United Kingdom	For British and North American Royal Mail Steam Packet Company.
22 September	Cherokee	Paddle steamer			(United Kingdom of Great Britain and Ireland) Province of Canada	For Royal Navy.
23 September	John Cunningham	Brig	Charles Connell & Sons.	Belfast	United Kingdom	For private owner.
23 September	Prince Albert	Steamship	Coutts	Walker	United Kingdom	For private owner.
September	Ashburton	Merchantman	Grinnell & Minturn	New York	United States	For private owner.
5 October	Lady Sale	East Indiaman	Messrs. Humprey's	Wilcolmlee	United Kingdom	For private owner.
6 October	Castle Eden	Full-rigged ship	Watson	Pallion	United Kingdom	For Messrs. Greenwell & Packer.
6 October	Dahlia	Sloop	William Coulson	Hull	United Kingdom	For private owner.
19 October	Problem	Sailboat	Messrs. J. Brown & Co.	Kirkcaldy	United Kingdom	For Mr. Dempster.
21 October	Cumberland	Third rate		Chatham Dockyard	United Kingdom	For Royal Navy.
24 October	Martello	Paddle steamer	Messrs. Thomas Wingate & Co.	Broomielaw	United Kingdom	For Hull and Leith Steam Packet Company.
29 October	Hannah Codner	Schooner	Hocking	Stonehouse	United Kingdom	For private owner.
31 October	Gazelle	Iris-class schooner		Brest	France	For French Navy.
October	Jane	Snow	Rodham & Todd	Sunderland	United Kingdom	For Potts & Co.
October	Maria	Brig		Prince Edward Island	(United Kingdom of Great Britain and Ireland) Colony of Prince Edward Island	For private owner.
3 November	Grace Darling	Schooner	Messrs. Wright, Plummer & Co.	Hull	United Kingdom	For private owner.
4 November	Alice	Barque	Robert Innes	Leith	United Kingdom	For R. F. Davidson.
5 November	Joseph Alexander	Sloop	Messrs. Wake, Sissons & Sons	Goole	United Kingdom	For William Briggs.
24 November	Felice	Man-of-war		Ramsgate	United Kingdom	For Royal Sicilian Navy.
25 November	Father Mathew	Schooner		Galway	United Kingdom	For private owner.
November	Enoch Turley	Pilot boat		Baltimore, Maryland	United States	For Gus Clampitt, George Conwell, William Edwards, James R. Kelley, John H. Kelley, John S. Kelly, Harry Long, John Maull, James A. Orton, Harry M. Parker, George W. Pride, Morgan B. Saunders, Charles D. Schellenger, Luster D. Schellenger, Peter R. Schellenger, George Wallace, Lew Wallace, Samuel West, and John West.
3 December	Guide	Brig	Laird	North Birkenhead	United Kingdom	For British East India Company.
3 December	The Prince	Lightship	Laird	North Birkenhead	United Kingdom	For Liverpool Dock Trust.
6 December	Napoléon	Steamship	Chantiers Augustin Normand	Havre de Grâce	France	For Frédéric Sauvage.
29 December	Arciduca Federico	Steamship	Acramans, Morgan & Co.	Bristol	United Kingdom	For Österreichischer Lloyd.
December	Pandora	Barque	Messrs. W. & J. Lawton	Saint John	(United Kingdom of Great Britain and Ireland) Colony of New Brunswick	For private owner.
Spring	Atalante	Steamship	Messrs. Gordons & Co	Deptford	United Kingdom	For private owner.
Spring	James Campbell	Barque		River Clyde	United Kingdom	For private owner.
Unknown date	Adele	Merchantman		Sunderland	United Kingdom	For Petchell & Co.
Unknown date	Alert	Schooner	Nicholas Butson	Polruan	United Kingdom	For private owner.
Unknown date	Alexandrina	Merchantman		Sunderland	United Kingdom	For Blair & Co.
Unknown date	Ann	Schooner	Austin & Mills	Sunderland	United Kingdom	For Ogle & Co.
Unknown date	Ann and Mary	Schooner	J. Teasdale	Sunderland	United Kingdom	For B. Green.
Unknown date	Anna Robertson	Barque		Sunderland	United Kingdom	For Mr. Robertson.
Unknown date	Arrietta	Merchantman	Laing & Simey	Sunderland	United Kingdom	For Laing & Co.
Unknown date	Briton	Merchantman			(United Kingdom of Great Britain and Ireland) "Canada"	For private owner.
Unknown date	Brunswick	Paddle steamer	Ditchburn & Mare	Blackwall, London	United Kingdom	For London and Blackwall Railway.
Unknown date	Callao	Brig	T. & J. Brocklebank	Whitehaven	United Kingdom	For Thomas & John Brocklebank.
Unknown date	Cassandra	Merchantman	Lightfoot	Sunderland	United Kingdom	For T. Potter.
Unknown date	Colaba	Lightship		Bombay	India	For British East India Company.
Unknown date	Commodore	Merchantman	W. Wilkinson	Sunderland	United Kingdom	For Hay & Co.
Unknown date	Croxdale	Merchantman	Hull & Sikes	Sunderland	United Kingdom	For H. Dixon.
Unknown date	Diadem	Merchantman		Sunderland	United Kingdom	For T. Brown.
Unknown date	Dublin	Barque		Sunderland	United Kingdom	For Deaker & Edmonds.
Unknown date	Elizabeth	Barque		Sunderland	United Kingdom	For Lawson & Co.
Unknown date	Elizabeth Thompson	Barque		Sunderland	United Kingdom	For Mr. Thompson.
Unknown date	Excavator	Schooner	J. Haswell	Sunderland	United Kingdom	For W. Cowan.
Unknown date	Favori	Cutter		Cherbourg	France	For French Navy
Unknown date	Fortitude	Barque	Tindall	Scarborough	United Kingdom	For Mr. Tindall.
Unknown date	Forward	Cutter	William Easby	Washington, Virginia	United States	For United States Revenue Marine.
Unknown date	Girl I Love	Schooner	W. & H. Browne	Passage West	United Kingdom	For private owner.
Unknown date	Goddess	Schooner	William Bayley	Ipswich	United Kingdom	For private owner.
Unknown date	Grace	Schooner	T. S. Dixon	Sunderland	United Kingdom	For T. Dixon.
Unknown date	Haal	Full-rigged ship		Rotterdam	Netherlands	For Royal Netherlands Navy.
Unknown date	Heldin	Sixth rate		Vlissingen	Netherlands	For Royal Netherlands Navy.
Unknown date	Hewson	Snow		Sunderland	United Kingdom	For Mr. Hewson.
Unknown date	Hugh Lupus	Schooner	Bridgewater Trustees, or Bridgewater Navigation Company	Runcorn	United Kingdom	For private owner.
Unknown date	Isabella	Merchantman	Peter Austin	Sunderland	United Kingdom	For Palmer & Co.
Unknown date	Jacob Bell	Paddle steamer	Brown & Bell	New York	United States	For private owner.
Unknown date	Judith Allan	Full-rigged ship	Austin & Mills	Sunderland	United Kingdom	For John Allan.
Unknown date	Kirtons	Brig		Hylton	United Kingdom	For C. S. Kirton.
Unknown date	Libya	Schooner	Bridge Foundry Company	Warrington	United Kingdom	For private owner.
Unknown date	Lynx	Full-rigged ship		Vlissingen	Netherlands	For Royal Netherlands Navy.
Unknown date	Maid of Iowa	Sternwheeler	Dan Jones and Levi Moffitt	Mississippi River	United Kingdom	For Dan Jones and Levi Moffitt.
Unknown date	Mary	Schooner		Sunderland	United Kingdom	For Mr. Buchanan.
Unknown date	Marys and Anns	Snow	Bowman and Drummond	Blyth	United Kingdom	For Gibson & Co.
Unknown date	Medusa	Paddle steamer			United Kingdom	For British East India Company.
Unknown date	Montezuma	Paddle frigate	Green, Wigram's & Green	Blackwall	United Kingdom	For Mexican Navy.
Unknown date	Nemesis	Paddle steamer		Liverpool	United Kingdom	For Indian Navy.
Unknown date	New Zealand	Barque	T. Gales	Sunderland	United Kingdom	For P. Laing.
Unknown date	Norval	Merchantman		Sunderland	United Kingdom	For Mr. Greenwell.
Unknown date	Ørnen	Brig	Andreas Schifter	Orlogsværftet	Denmark	For Royal Danish Navy.
Unknown date	Orus	Paddle steamer	Bishop & Simonson	New York	United Kingdom	For James P. Allaire.
Unknown date	Pansy	Merchantman		Sunderland	United Kingdom	For J. Allcock.
Unknown date	Paragon	Snow		Sunderland	United Kingdom	For Mr. Hodgson.
Unknown date	Philip	Schooner	Brundrit & Whiteway	Runcorn	United Kingdom	For Brundrit & Whiteway.
Unknown date	Prince of Wales	Merchantman	Thompson & Pearson	Sunderland	United Kingdom	For White & Co.
Unknown date	Prince of Wales	Schooner		Cemaes	United Kingdom	For private owner.
Unknown date	Prince Oscar	Snow	J. Mackey	Sunderland	United Kingdom	For Mr. Lawsons.
Unknown date	Princess	Brigantine		Sunderland	United Kingdom	For W. Briggs.
Unknown date	Railway	Paddle steamer	Ditchburn & Mare	Blackwall	United Kingdom	For London and Blackwall Railway.
Unknown date	Rajasthan	full-rigged ship		Cochin	India	For private owner.
Unknown date	Rambler	Brig		Hylton	United Kingdom	For private owner.
Unknown date	Renown	Barque	R. & H. Green	Blackwall Yard	United Kingdom	For private owner.
Unknown date	Revenge	Brig		Seaham	United Kingdom	For private owner.
Unknown date	Robinson	Brig	R. Robinson	Sunderland	United Kingdom	For Mr. Robinson.
Unknown date	Sabina	Barque	R. Hutchinson	Sunderland	United Kingdom	For private owner.
Unknown date	Saint Helena	Snow	T. Rountree	Sunderland	United Kingdom	For Mr. Rountree.
Unknown date	Sir James Rivett Carnac	Steamship		Bombay	India	For private owner.
Unknown date	Stag	Merchantman		Sunderland	United Kingdom	For R. Green.
Unknown date	Star of Oregon	Schooner	Felix Hathaway	Willamette River	(United States) Oregon Country	For Felix Hathaway.
Unknown date	Sylph	Snow		Sunderland	United Kingdom	For private owner.
Unknown date	Templar	Full-rigged ship	Francis Oliver	Sunderland	United Kingdom	For Ingleby & Co.
Unknown date	Tir-i Sevket	Second rate		Constantinople	Ottoman Empire	For Ottoman Navy.
Unknown date	Underley	Barque	Laing & Simey	Sunderland	United Kingdom	For Laing & Co.
Unknown date	Union	Steamship		Norfolk Navy Yard	United States	For United States Navy.
Unknown date	Utility	Brig	Cuthbert Potts & brothers	Sunderland	United Kingdom	For private owner.
Unknown date	Vanderbilt	Schooner			United States	For United States Coast Survey.
Unknown date	Venus	schooner		Sunderland	United Kingdom	For Mr. Page.
Unknown date	Verbena	Snow	J. Barkes	Sunderland	United Kingdom	For Mr. Anderson.
Unknown date	Victory	Barque	Benjamin Brown	Sunderland	United Kingdom	For Brown & Co.
Unknown date	Vouga	Schooner			Portugal	For Portuguese Navy.
Unknown date	Watson	Schooner	Benjamin Hodgson	Sunderland	United Kingdom	For private owner.
