= HMS Scourge (1844) =

Sloop of the Royal Navy

History

United Kingdom
- Name: HMS Scourge
- Ordered: 18 March 1841
- Builder: Royal Dockyard, Portsmouth
- Cost: £55,002
- Laid down: February 1844
- Launched: 9 November 1844
- Completed: 13 May 1846
- Commissioned: 26 November 1845
- Fate: Broken in 1865

General characteristics
- Type: Steam Vessels (SV2); First Class Sloop
- Tons burthen: 1123 62/94 bm
- Length: 190 ft 0 in (57.9 m) gundeck; 166 ft 0.75 in (50.6 m) keel for tonnage
- Beam: 36 ft 0 in (11.0 m) maximum; 35 ft 8 in (10.9 m) for tonnage
- Draught: 7 ft 9.75 in (2.4 m) forward; 8 ft 4 in (2.5 m) aft
- Depth of hold: 21 ft 0 in (6.4 m)
- Installed power: 378 NHP
- Propulsion: 2-cylinder VSE direct acting steam engine; Paddles
- Armament: 1 × 13-inch mortar; 2 × 68-pdr (95 cwt) MLSB guns on broadside trucks; armament change 1853; 2 × 42-pdr (84 cwt) MLSB guns on pivot mounts; 2 × 68-pdr (64 cwt) MLSB guns on broadside trucks; 2 × 42-pdr (22 cwt) carronades

HMS Scourge was a Bulldog-class sloop designed by Sir William Symonds, Surveyor of the Navy. Originally she was ordered as a Driver-class sloop, however, under Admiralty Order of 26 December 1843 she was directed to be built to a new specification. She was initially commissioned for service with the Channel Squadron before moving to the North America and West Indies Station. She then served in the Mediterranean then the west coast of Africa. Her final service was in the Mediterranean. She was broken in 1865.

Scourge was the sixth named vessel since it was used for a 14-gun brig-sloop, launched by Allin of Dover on 26 October 1779, purchased on the stocks and foundered off the Dutch coast on 7 November 1795.

== Construction ==
She was ordered on 18 March 1841 from Portsmouth Dockyard though her keel was not laid until February 1844. She was launched on 9 November 1844. Following her launch she was towed to the East India Docks to have her boilers and machinery fitted. She was then towed back to Portsmouth and was completed for sea on 13 May 1846 at an initial cost of £55,002 including the hull at £21,328, machinery at £20,390 and fitting at £13,284. (Note: A total cost accounting for inflation of approximately £5,543,800 in today's money.)

== Commissioned service ==
=== First commission ===
She was commissioned on 26 November 1845 under Commander Jamea Crawford Caffin, RN for service with the Channel Squadron at Portsmouth. The 13-inch mortar was removed while with the Channel Squadron. On 1 October 1847 Commander Henry Edward Wingrove, RN took command for service on the North America and West Indies Station. Then in October 1849 Commander Lord Frederick Herbert Kerr, RN took command for service in the Mediterranean. She returned to Home Waters and paid off on 27 November 1852. While in steam reserve her armament was increased to six guns.

=== Second commission ===
She was commissioned in April 1854 under Commander John Adams, RN for the West Coast of Africa as Flag Ship of the Squadron. She returned to pay off on 28 November 1857.

=== Third commission ===
She was commissioned for the last time on 28 June 1858 under Commander H.S.H. Prince Victor of Hohenlobe-Langenberg for service in the Mediterranean. Commander William Gore Jones, RN took command on 13 December 1859. She returned and paid off on 8 February 1862.

== Disposition ==
She was broken in 1865.
