= HMS Bulldog (1845) =

Sloop of the Royal Navy

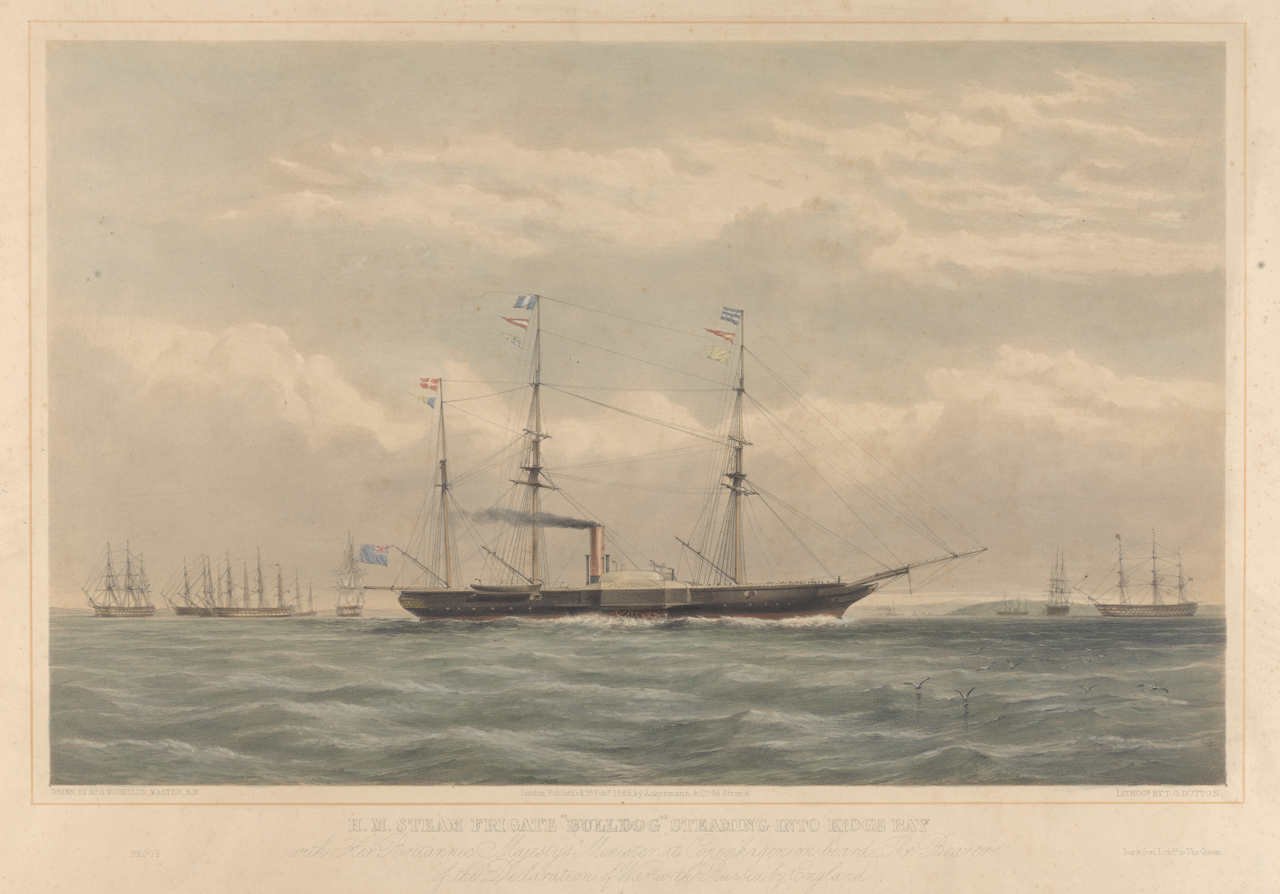
- H.M. Steam Frigate Bulldog steaming into Kioge Bay with Her Britannic Majesty's Minister at Copenhagen on board - The Bearer of the Declaration of War with Russia by Britain in 1854, lithograph by Dutton

History

United Kingdom
- Name: Bulldog
- Ordered: 18 March 1841
- Builder: Royal Dockyard, Chatham
- Laid down: 7 July 1844
- Launched: 2 October 1845
- Completed: 7 September 1846
- Commissioned: 25 June 1846
- Honours and awards: Baltic 1854-1855
- Fate: Ran aground and blown up, 23 October 1865

General characteristics
- Type: Steam Vessels (SV2); First Class Sloop
- Tons burthen: 1125 71/94 bm
- Length: 190 ft 0 in (57.9 m) gundeck; 166 ft 2.125 in (50.7 m) keel for tonnage
- Beam: 36 ft 0.75 in (11.0 m) maximum; 35 ft 8.25 in (10.9 m) for tonnage
- Draught: 7 ft 11.5 in (2.4 m) forward; 8 ft 5 in (2.6 m) aft
- Depth of hold: 21 ft 0 in (6.4 m)
- Installed power: 500 NHP
- Propulsion: 2-cylinder VSE direct acting steam engine; Paddles
- Armament: 2 × 42-pdr (84 cwt) MLSB guns on pivot mounts; 2 × 68-pdr (64 cwt) MLSB guns on broadside trucks; 2 × 42-pdr (22 cwt) carronades; 1862 Armament change; 1 × 68-pdr 95 cwt or 110=pdr 82 cwt on pivot mount; 4 × 8-inch 52 cwt shell guns on broadside trucks

HMS Bulldog was a Bulldog-class sloop designed by Sir William Symonds, Surveyor of the Navy. Originally she was ordered as a Driver-class sloop, however, under Admiralty Order of 26 December 1843 she was directed to be built to a new specification. After commissioning she sailed for the Cape of Good Hope. She then was in the Baltic Sea for the Crimean War. She carried out ocean sounding for the Atlantic telegraph. She was lost while in action with the Haitians in 1865.

== Construction ==
She was ordered on 18 March 1841 from Chatham Dockyard though her keel was not laid until 7 July 1844. She was launched on 2 October 1845. Following her launch she was towed to the East India Dock to have her boilers and machinery fitted. She was then towed to Chatham and was completed for sea on 7 September 1846 at an initial cost of £58,122 including the hull at £23,342, machinery at £24,892 and fitting at £8,338. (Note: A total cost accounting for inflation of approximately £5,858,200 in today's money.)

== Commissioned service ==
=== First commission ===
She was commissioned at Devonport under Commander George Evans Davis, RN on 25 June 1846 for service on the Cape of Good Hope Station. By December she was back in Devonport. Commander Astley Cooper Key, RN took command on 4 May 1847 and assigned to the Mediterranean. She returned paying off on 16 April 1850.

=== Second commission ===
She commissioned on 23 January 1854 under the command of Commander William King Hall, RN for service in the Baltic Sea during the Crimean War. She was the flagship of Sir Robert Napier during the bombardment of Bomarsund on 16 August 1854.

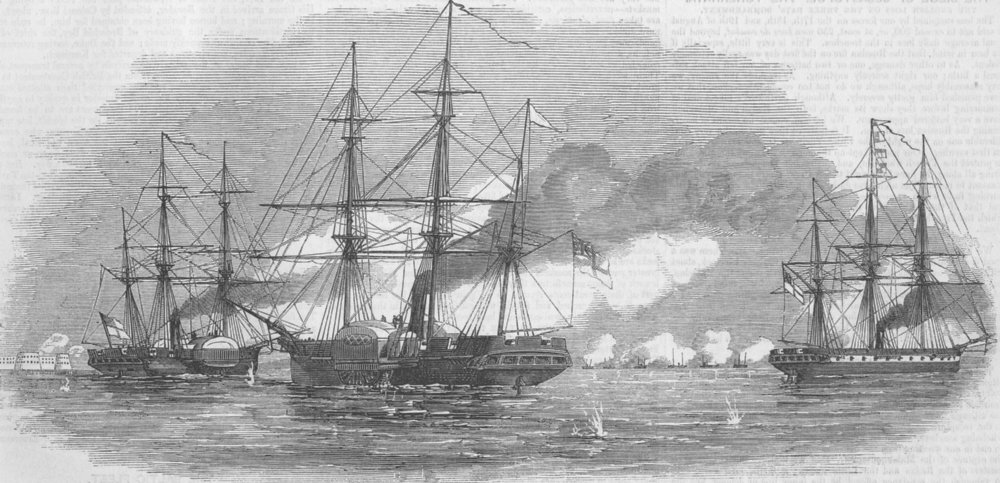
HMS Centaur, Bulldog, and Imperieuse, engaged with Six Russian Gun-Boats, off Cronstadt, Illustrated Times, 1855

In February 1855 her new commander was Commander Alexander Crombie Gordon, RN for her return to the Baltic. By December 1856 she had been assigned to particular service. She was paid off into steam reserve on 25 March 1857.

=== Third commission ===
On 2 June 1860 she was commissioned under Sir Francis Leopold McClintock for ocean sounding for the Atlantic Telegraph. Commander Henry Frederick McKillop, RN took command on 3 December 1860. During 1861 she was fitted with Armstrong guns before proceeding to the North America and West Indies Station.

=== Fourth commission ===
In March 1864 she was commissioned for service on the North American and West Indies Station under the command of Captain Charles Wake, RN.

== Loss ==
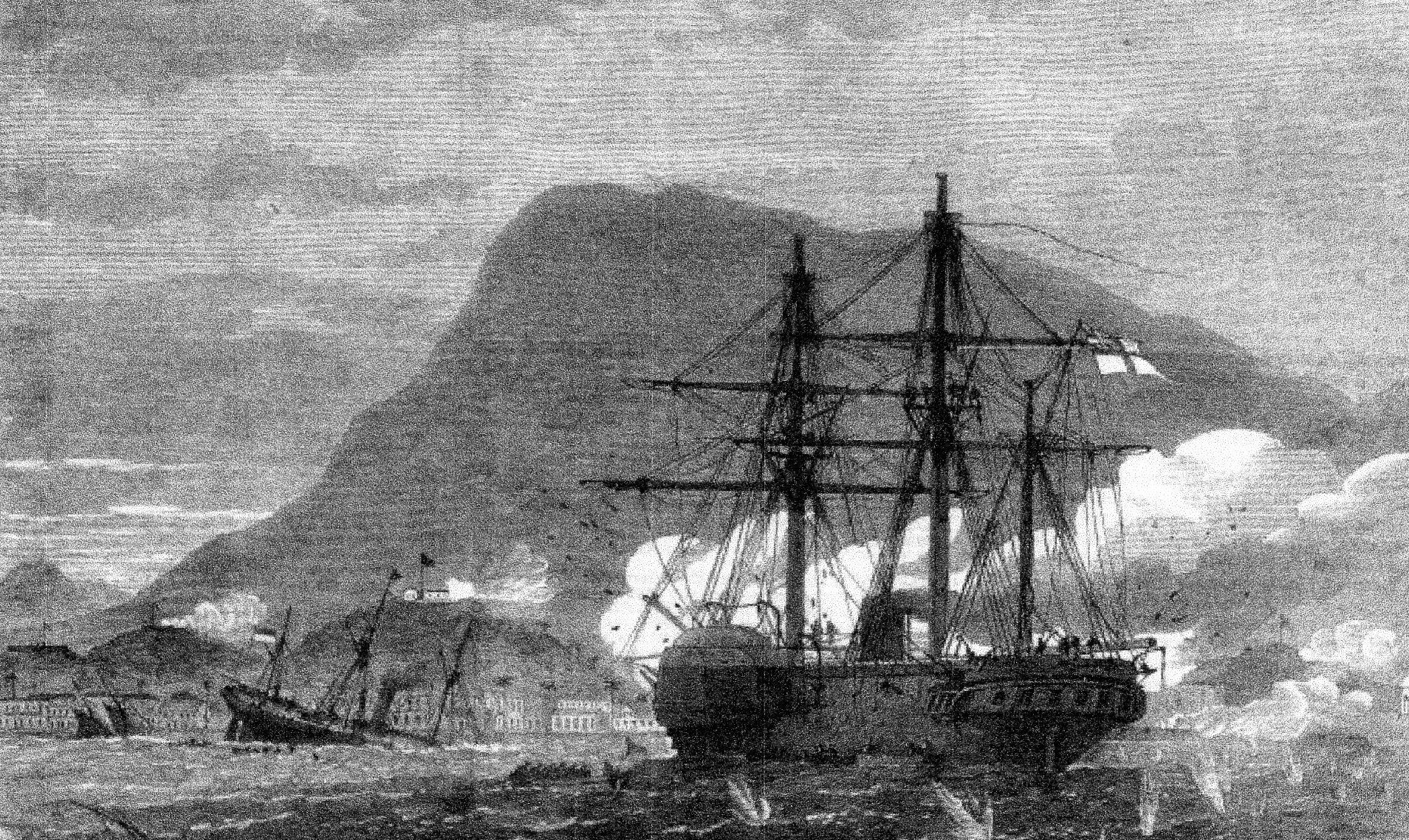
Bulldog in Conflict with the Flotilla and Forts at Cape Haytien, on the Coast of Hayti, Illustrated London News, 1865

She was in action at Cape Haytien with Haitian ships and forts on 23 October 1865. She sank the Haitian ships Valorogue and a schooner before she was run aground then deliberately blown up.
