= Claude Buckle (Royal Navy officer, born 1803) =

Royal Navy Admiral (1803–1894)

Admiral Sir Claude Buckle KCB
- Born: 13 December 1803; Blackheath, Kent, England
- Died: 10 March 1894 (aged 90); London, England
- Military career
- Allegiance: United Kingdom
- Branch: Royal Navy
- Rank: Admiral
- Commands: HMS Growler; HMS Centaur; HMS Valorous; Royal William Victualling Yard; Queenstown
- Conflicts: Crimean War
- Awards: Knight Commander of the Order of the Bath

Admiral Sir Claude Henry Mason Buckle KCB (13 December 1803 – 10 March 1894) was an English naval officer.

== Life ==
Claude Buckle was the grandson of Admiral Matthew Buckle (1716–1784) and second son of Admiral Matthew Buckle (1770–1855). He entered the Royal Naval College at Portsmouth in August 1817.

In March 1819 he passed out, and after serving for a few months in the Channel was appointed to the Leander, going out to the East Indies. In her and in her boats he was actively employed during the First Anglo-Burmese War and at the capture of Rangoon in May 1824. Returning to England in January 1826, he was appointed in April to the Ganges, going out to the South American station as flagship of Sir Robert Waller Otway, and in her was promoted to be lieutenant on 17 April 1827.

He afterwards (1829–33) served in the sixth-rate HMS North Star and the sixth-rate HMS Tweed, on the West Indian station; from 1833 to 1836 was flag-lieutenant to Sir William Hargood at Plymouth; and on 4 May 1836 was promoted to the rank of commander.

From December 1841 to October 1845, he commanded the gunboat HMS Growler, on the coast of Brazil and afterwards on the west coast of Africa, and in February 1845 led the boats of the squadron under the command of Commodore William Gore Jones at the destruction of several barracoons up the Gallinas river.

On returning to England he was advanced to post rank, 6 November 1845.

In January 1849, he was appointed to the frigate HMS Centaur as flag-captain to Commodore Arthur Fanshawe, going out as commander-in-chief on the west coast of Africa, where, in December 1849, being detached in command of the boats of the squadron, together with the steamer HMS Teazer and the French steamer Rubis, he 'administered condign punishment' to a horde of pirates who had established themselves in the river Geba and had made prizes of some small trading vessels.

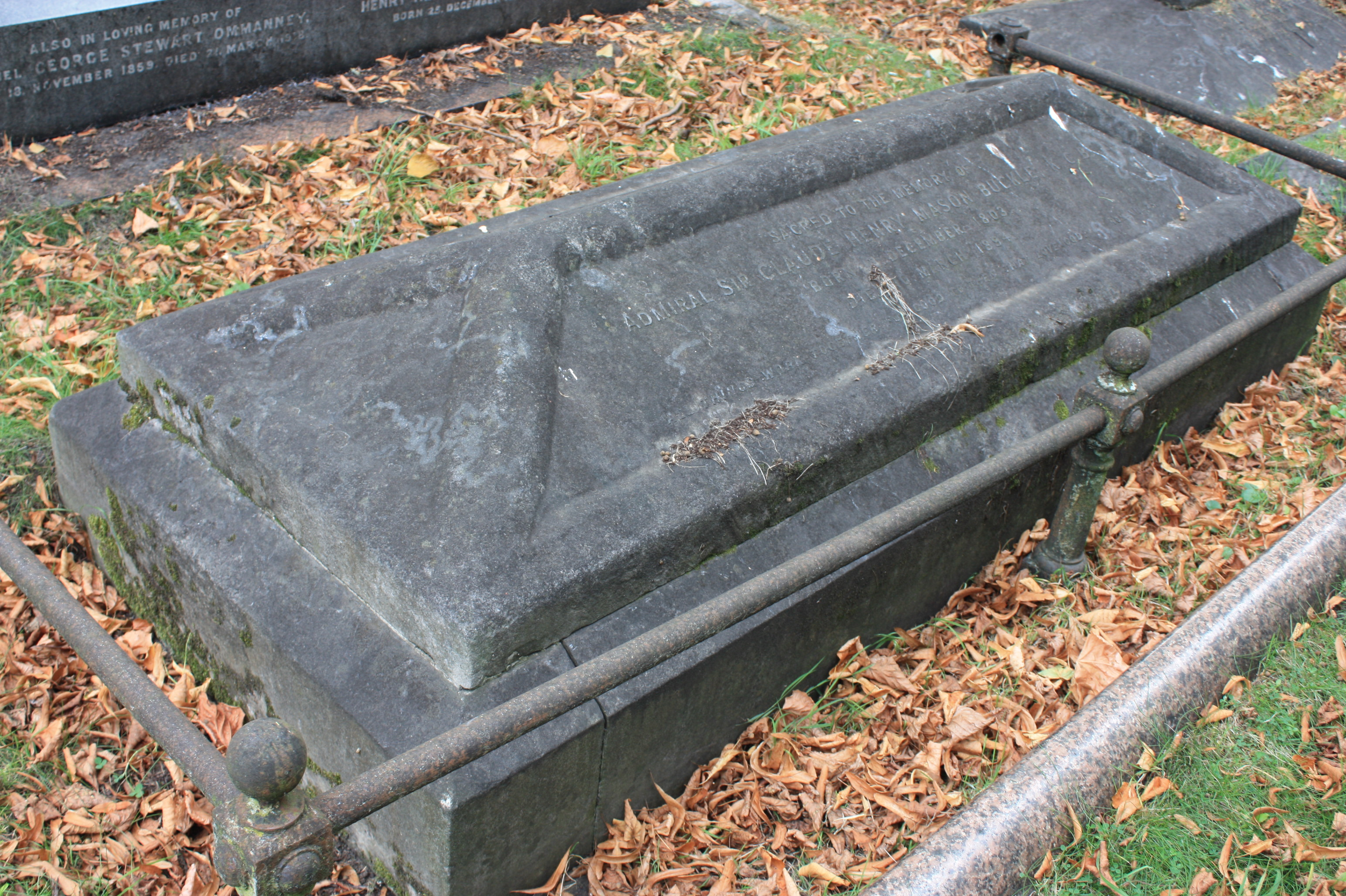
The grave of Admiral Claude Buckle, Brompton Cemetery

Towards the end of 1850, Buckle was compelled by failing health to return to England; and in December 1852 he was appointed to the frigate HMS Valorous, attached during 1853 to the Channel squadron, and in 1854 to the fleet up the Baltic under Sir Charles Napier, and more particularly to the flying squadron under Rear-admiral (Sir) James Hanway Plumridge in the operations in the Gulf of Bothnia. In the end of 1854, the Valorous was sent out to the Black Sea, where she carried the flag of (Sir) Houston Stewart at the reduction of Kinburn.

On 5 July 1855, Buckle was nominated a C.B. From 1857 to 1863 he was superintendent of Deptford dockyard, and on 14 November 1863 was promoted to the rank of rear-admiral.

In November 1867, he was appointed Commander-in-Chief, Queenstown, where he remained until he retired, under Mr. Childers's scheme, in 1870.

He was made a vice-admiral on 1 April 1870, K.C.B. on 29 May 1875, admiral on 22 Jan. 1877, and was granted a good-service pension on 30 October 1885.

He died on 10 March 1894. He is buried at Brompton Cemetery.

== Family ==
He married in 1847 Harriet Margaret, eldest daughter of Thomas Deane Shute of Bramshaw, Hampshire, and they had one son.

== Notes ==
Military offices
Preceded by Charles Frederick	Commander-in-Chief, Queenstown; 1867–1869	Succeeded by Frederick Warden
