= HMS Duke of Wellington (1852) =

Ship of the line of the Royal Navy

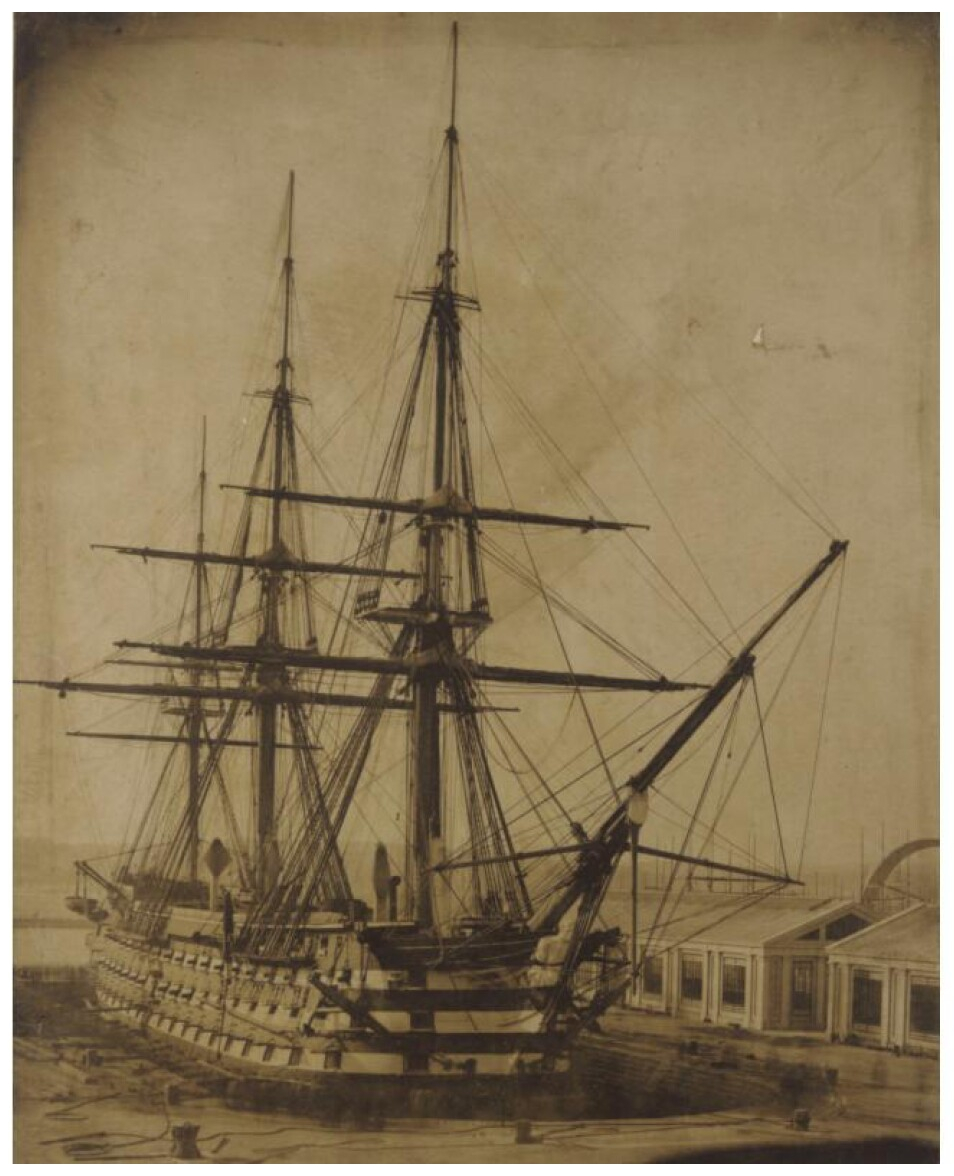
- Duke of Wellington in drydock at Keyham, Devonport Dockyard, 5 March 1854

History

United Kingdom
- Name: Duke of Wellington
- Namesake: Arthur Wellesley, 1st Duke of Wellington
- Ordered: 19 February 1844
- Builder: Pembroke Dockyard
- Laid down: May 1849
- Launched: 14 September 1852
- Completed: 27 November 1853
- Commissioned: 2 February 1853
- Renamed: From Windsor Castle, 1 October 1852
- Fate: Sold for scrap, 12 April 1904

General characteristics (as completed)
- Class & type: Modified Queen-class ship of the line
- Displacement: 6,071 long tons (6,168 t)
- Tons burthen: 3,771 19/94 (bm)
- Length: 240 ft 7 in (73.3 m) (gun deck)
- Beam: 60 ft 1 in (18.3 m)
- Draught: 20 ft 3 in (6.2 m) (light)
- Depth of hold: 24 ft 8 in (7.5 m)
- Installed power: Boilers; 1,979 ihp (1,476 kW)
- Propulsion: 1 shaft; 1 single-expansion steam engine
- Sail plan: Full-rigged ship
- Speed: 10.2 knots (18.9 km/h; 11.7 mph)
- Complement: 1,100
- Armament: 131 muzzle-loading, smoothbore guns: Lower deck: 10 × 8 in (203 mm) shell guns + 24 32 pdr guns; Middle gun deck: 6 × 8 in shell guns + 30 × 32 pdr guns; Upper gun deck: 38 × 32 pdr guns; Quarterdeck & Forecastle: 20 × 32 pdr gunnades + 1 × 68 pdr gun

HMS Duke of Wellington was a 131-gun, first-rate, modified Queen-class ship of the line built for the Royal Navy (RN) during the 1850s. She was converted to screw-propulsion while still under construction. Completed in 1853, the ship served as the flagship of the Baltic Fleet during the Crimean War of 1854–1856 against the Russian Empire. Afterwards, Duke of Wellington was assigned to the Mediterranean Fleet until she was paid off in 1857. She briefly served as a depot ship and then became a training and receiving ship throughout most of the 1860s. In 1869, the ship became the flagship of the Commander-in-Chief, Portsmouth, and served in that role until 1888. Duke of Wellington was then hulked to serve as an accommodation ship from 1900 until 1903. She was sold for scrap the following year.

== Background and description ==
Initially named HMS Windsor Castle after the royal castle, she was originally ordered on 19 February 1844 as a sister ship of the Surveyor of the Navy, Sir William Symonds's, 110-gun, first rate Queen, but work was suspended on 9 December. After Symonds's resignation in 1847, her design was modified by the Assistant Surveyor John Edye into a 120-gun ship and she was reordered to the modified design on 29 June 1848. She was intended to measure 210 feet (64 m) at the gun deck and 171 feet 1 inch (52.1 m) at the keel. The ship would have had a beam of 60 feet (18.3 m), a depth of hold of 24 feet 8 inches (7.5 m) and had a tonnage of 3,185 61/94 tons burthen. Her crew would have numbered 970 officers and ratings. The ship had the usual three-masted full-ship rig.

Windsor Castle was intended to be armed with 120 muzzle-loading, smoothbore guns that consisted of thirty 8 in (203 mm) (65 cwt), 68-pounder shell guns (Note: "Cwt" is the abbreviation for hundredweight, 65 cwt referring to the weight of the gun.) on her lower gun deck, thirty 32-pounder (56 cwt) guns on her middle gun deck and thirty 32-pounders (42 cwt) on her upper gun deck. Her forecastle and quarterdeck would have carried a total of six 32-pounders (42 cwt) and fourteen short 32-pounder (25 cwt) guns between them. Four 18-pounder carronades would have been positioned on her poop deck.

=== Conversion ===
In response to the revolutionary French 90-gun, screw-powered ship of the line, Napoléon, the new Surveyor, Captain Baldwin Wake Walker, had already ordered the 101-gun, second rate St Jean d'Acre, but he wanted a first rate as soon as possible. He send Edye to HM Dockyard, Pembroke in December 1851 to determine Windsor Castle's suitability for conversion to screw power as she was already well advanced on the stocks. Receiving a favorable report, he reordered the ship as a 131-gun steam ship on 19 January 1852. She needed to be cut in into two parts to add 23 feet (7 m) amidships to accommodate the engines and boilers and 8 feet (2.4 m) at the stern to improve the flow of water to the screw. This was done on 7 February 1852 by launching the stern section and then reattaching it after the new amidships section had been built.

Windsor Castle's length at the gun deck increased to 240 feet 7 inches (73.3 m) and 201 feet 11 inches (61.5 m) on the keel. She had a beam of 60 feet 1 inch (18.3 m) and her depth of hold did not increase. The ship had a deep draught of 24 feet 5 inches (7.4 m), a tonnage of 3,771 19/94, and displaced 6,071 long tons (6,168 t). Her crew numbered 1,100 officers and ratings. The ship received the 700 nominal horsepower engine that had been built by Robert Napier and Sons for the iron frigate Simoom, which had surrendered it on conversion to a troopship. The two-cylinder, geared, single-expansion steam engine drove a single propeller shaft. To reduce drag and improve performance under sail, the ship could hoist her propeller into the hull and retract the telescoping funnel. During her sea trials on 11 April 1853 in Stokes Bay, the ship's boilers provided enough steam for the engine to produce 1,979 indicated horsepower (1,476 kW) that was good for a speed of 10.2 knots (18.9 km/h; 11.7 mph). In service her engine proved unsatisfactory.

The ship was armed with 131 guns that consisted of twenty-six 32-pounder (56 cwt) guns and ten 8-inch (65 cwt), 68-pounder shell guns on her lower gun deck, thirty 56-cwt 32-pounder guns and six 8-inch shell guns on her middle gun deck and thirty-eight 32-pounders (42 cwt) on her upper gun deck. Between her forecastle and quarterdeck, she carried twenty 32-pounder gunnades and a single 68-pounder gun that was positioned on the forecastle as a pivot gun so that it could serve as a bow chaser.

== Construction and career ==
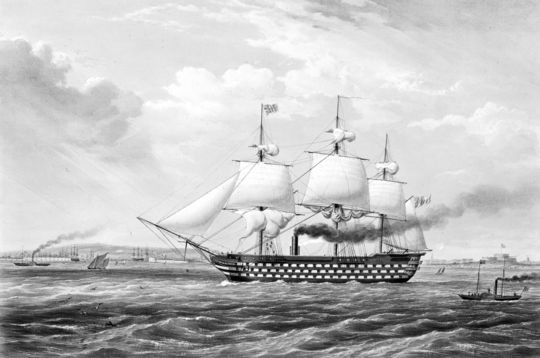
Duke of Wellington in 1853, running under steam and sail

Windsor Castle, the third ship of her name in the RN, was laid down in May 1849 and was launched on 14 September 1852. The Duke of Wellington died that same day and the ship was renamed in his honour on 1 October. She was the first ship of her name to serve in the RN. The ship departed for the installation of her engine on 9 October for HM Dockyard, Portsmouth, under tow by the paddle sloop Inflexible. Her original lion figurehead was replaced by an image of the Duke in February 1853 that was carved by Hellyer & Sons. She was commissioned by Commodore Henry Byam Martin on 2 February for service with the Western Squadron.

The decisive Russian victory in the Battle of Sinop over the Ottoman Navy on 30 November alarmed politicians in both Britain and France. They decided to intervene on the side of the Ottomans and the British began forming a Baltic Fleet in February 1854 in anticipation of war. The Russians did not withdraw their forces in the Balkans as demanded by the British and French governments on 27 February and declarations of war by both governments followed a month later. Admiral Sir Charles Napier, commander-in-chief of the Baltic Fleet, was charged to blockade the exit from the Baltic Sea and all of the Russian ports therein. Napier hoisted his flag aboard Duke of Wellington, departing Spithead on 11 March and proceeded towards the mouth of the Gulf of Finland in mid-April with his initial forces. The ship did not participate in any action in 1854 and was part of the force based near Nargen Island (now Naissaar) blockading Reval (now Tallinn) and the southern coast of the Gulf of Finland by late 1854. By 19 October, bad weather had forced the ships to withdraw to Kiel, Germany, where they blockaded the entrance to the Baltic Sea until December when they were ordered home.

The ship returned to the Baltic the following year as the flagship of Napier’s successor in the command, Rear-Admiral Sir Richard Saunders Dundas. While departing Spithead in poor visibility on 4 April 1855, she collided with a large American merchantman off Beachy Head and had to return to Portsmouth for repairs. There was an outbreak of smallpox aboard her in May and she sailed to Fårösund, Sweden, to offload her sick for further treatment. Duke of Wellington was present at the Bombardment of Sveaborg in August, but did not participate in the bombardment. The flagship did not depart Nargen until mid-November and then proceeded home.

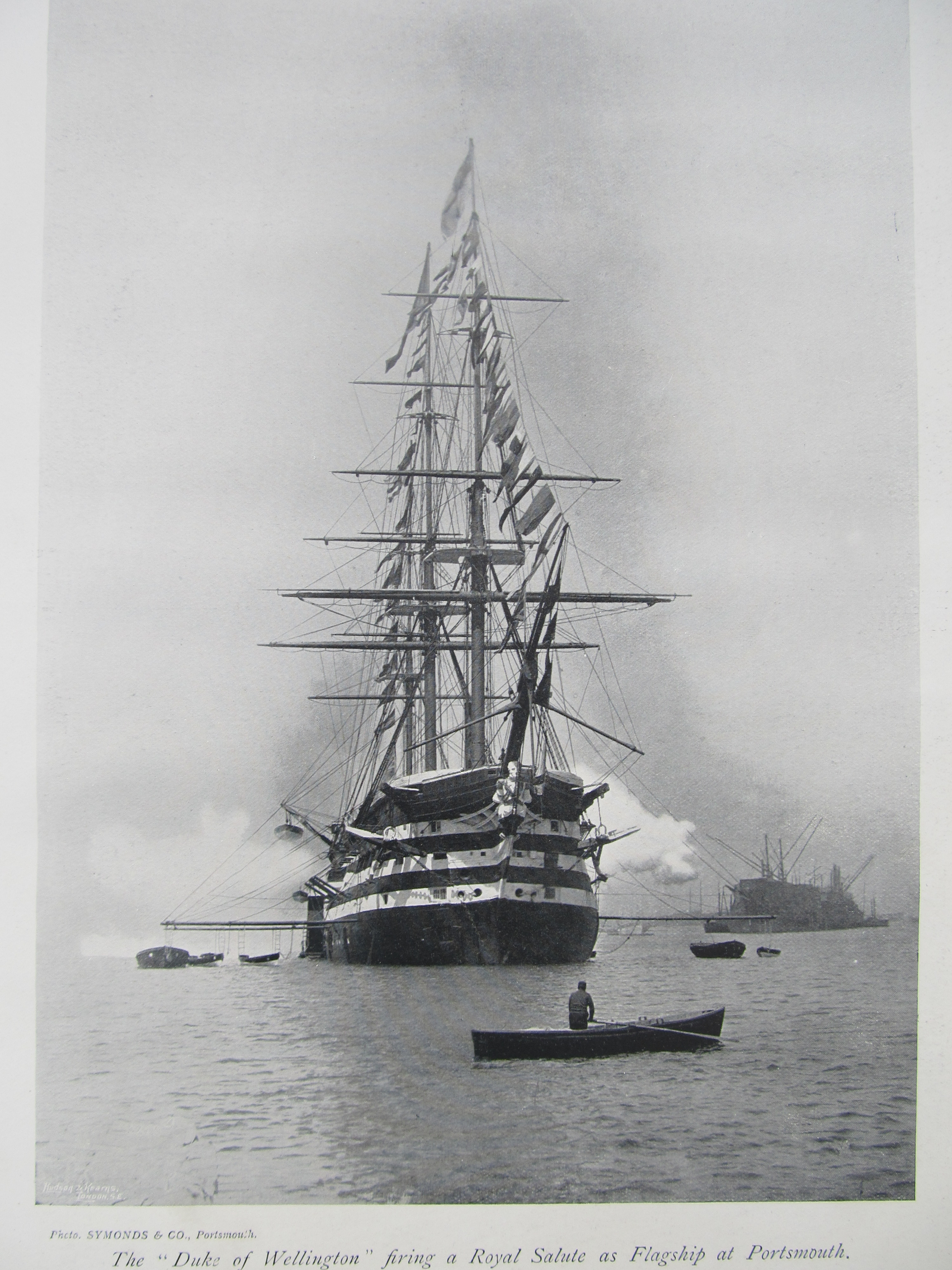
Duke of Wellington firing a gun salute in Portsmouth Harbour during her time as flagship there.

Her second-hand engines turned out distinctly unsatisfactory, and the hurried conversion had compromised her structural strength; after a stint with the Mediterranean Fleet in 1856–1857, she thus saw no active service and was paid off on 4 April 1857 into the 1st Division of the Steam Reserve. Duke of Wellington was briefly recommissioned by Captain Harry Eyres as a depot ship on 2 March 1858 in Portsmouth before being paid off on 30 June. The ship was recommissioned by Captain John Secombe on 1 May 1863 as a receiving and training ship at Portsmouth and Captain Charles Fellowes relieved Secombe on 12 July. During the visit of the French fleet to Portsmouth in August 1865, Duke of Wellington hosted the French officers to a dinner on 24 August. Fellows was relieved in his turn by Captain George Hancock on 10 September 1867.

She replaced HMS Victory as flagship of the port admiral and Commander-in-Chief, Portsmouth, on 20 December 1869 and continued as such until she was paid off on 31 March 1888. On 4 February 1879, a fire broke out at the fore of the ship. It was extinguished with the assistance of two tugs. Duke of Wellington was recommissioned in April 1900 by Captain William Hamilton to serve as an accommodation ship. The personnel stationed on her eventually moved into RN Barracks, Portsmouth, on 30 September 1903 and she was sold to Henry Castle & Sons to be broken up on 12 April 1904. Ship's timbers discovered on the Thames foreshore at Charlton have been identified as being from the Duke of Wellington.

== Bibliography ==
- Clowes, William Laird (1901). The Royal Navy: A History from the Earliest Times to the Present. Vol. VI. Sampson Low, Marston.
- Colledge, J. J.; Warlow, Ben & Bush, Steve (2020). Ships of the Royal Navy: The Complete Record of all Fighting Ships of the Royal Navy from the 15th Century to the Present (5th revised and updated ed.). Seaforth Publishing. ISBN 978-1-5267-9327-0.
- Duckers, Peter (2011). The Crimean War at Sea: Naval Campaigns against Russia, 1854-56. Pen & Sword Maritime. ISBN 978-1-84884-267-0.
- Jones, Colin (1996). "Entente Cordiale, 1865". In McLean, David & Preston, Antony (eds.). Warship 1996. Conway Maritime Press. pp. 31–40. ISBN 0-85177-685-X.
- Lambert, Andrew D. (1984). Battleships in Transition: The Creation of the Steam Battlefleet 1815-1860. Conway Maritime Press. ISBN 0-85177-315-X.
- Lambert, Andrew D. (1990). The Crimean War: British Grand Strategy, 1853–56. Manchester University Press. ISBN 0-7190-2978-3.
- Manning, T. D. & Walker, C. F. (1959). British Warship Names. Putnam. OCLC 838607.
- Phillips, Lawrie (2014). Pembroke Dockyard and the Old Navy: A Bicentennial History. The History Press. ISBN 978-0-7509-5214-9.
- Winfield, Rif (2014). British Warships in the Age of Sail 1817–1863: Design, Construction, Careers and Fates. Seaforth Publishing. ISBN 978-1-84832-169-4.
- Winfield, Rif (2010). First Rate: The Greatest Warships of the Age of Sail. Naval Institute Press. ISBN 978-1-59114-264-5.
