= HMS Caesar (1853) =

Royal Navy ship of the line launched in 1853

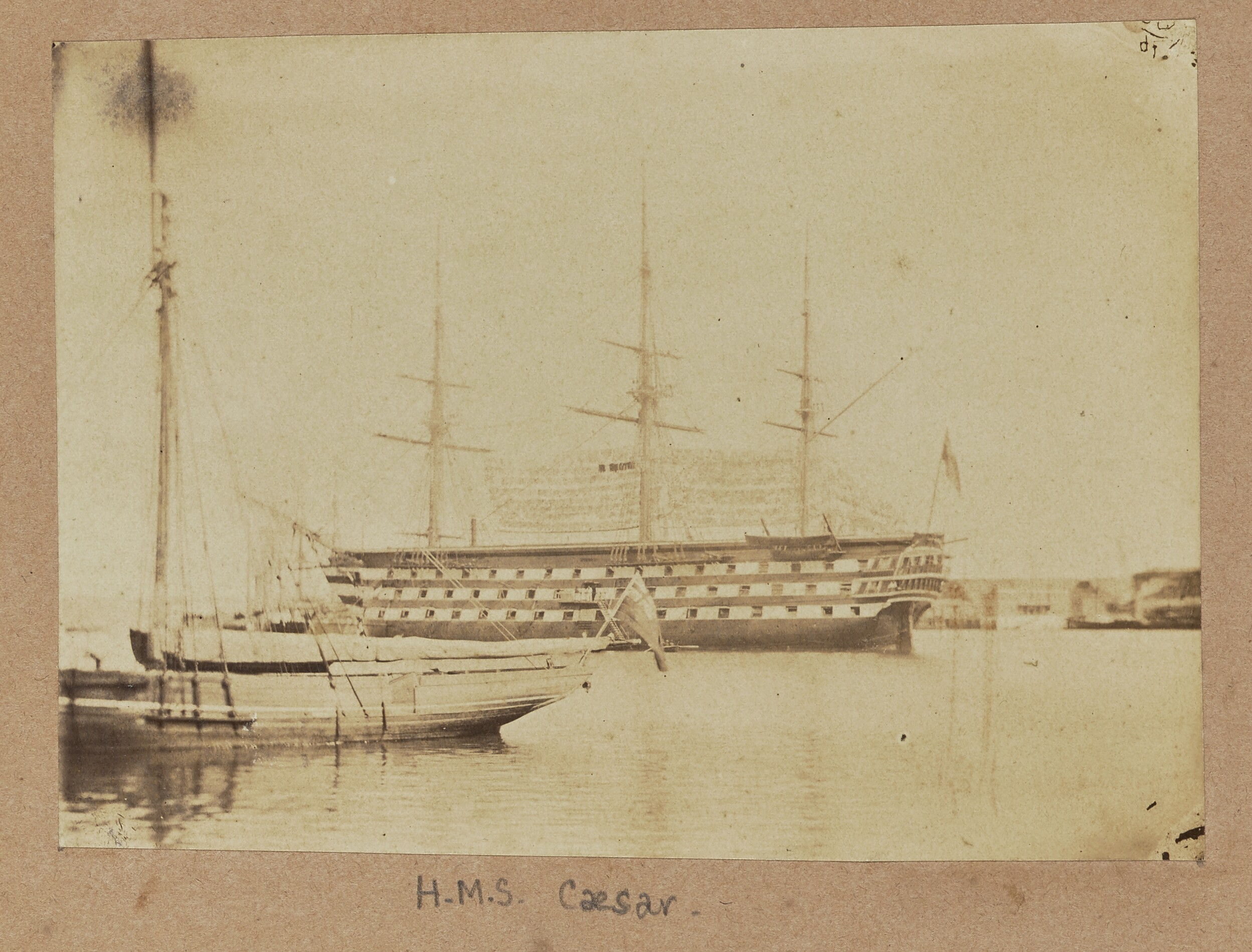
- Caesar photographed at anchor, c. 1858

Class overview
- Name: Caesar
- Operators: Royal Navy
- Preceded by: Princess Royal class
- Succeeded by: Conqueror class
- Built: 1847–1854
- In service: 1854–1862
- In commission: 1854–1862
- Completed: 1
- Scrapped: 1

History

United Kingdom
- Name: Caesar
- Ordered: 28 June 1847
- Builder: HM Dockyard, Pembroke
- Laid down: August 1848
- Launched: 7 August 1853
- Completed: 26 March 1854
- Commissioned: 21 January 1854
- Fate: Sold for scrap, 19 April 1870

General characteristics
- Type: 91-gun, second rate, ship of the line
- Displacement: 3,250 long tons (3,300 t)
- Tons burthen: 2,767 (bm)
- Length: 207 ft 4 in (63.2 m) (gun deck)
- Beam: 56 ft (17.1 m)
- Draught: 22 ft 8 in (6.9 m)
- Depth of hold: 23 ft 4 in (7.1 m)
- Installed power: Boilers; 1,420 ihp (1,060 kW)
- Propulsion: 1 shaft; 1 single-expansion steam engine
- Speed: 10.3 knots (19.1 km/h; 11.9 mph)
- Complement: 860
- Armament: 91 muzzle-loading, smoothbore guns; Lower gun deck: 32 × 8 in (203 mm) shell guns; Upper gun deck: 32 × 32 pdr guns; Forecastle & Quarterdeck: 26 × 32 pdr guns + 1 × 68 pdr gun

HMS Caesar was a 91-gun, second-rate, ship of the line built for the Royal Navy (RN) during the 1850s. She was converted to screw-propulsion whilst still under construction. The ship served in the Baltic during the Crimean War of 1854–1856 against the Russian Empire. After the war the ship was assigned to the Channel Squadron, the North America and West Indies Station, and the Mediterranean Fleet. Caesar was paid off in 1862 and was subsequently sold for scrap in 1870.

== Background and description ==
Caesar was initially ordered on 28 June 1847 from HM Dockyard, Portsmouth, to a modified Queen-class ship of the line design by the Chatham Committee of three graduates from the School of Naval Architecture as a sister to Algiers, but was reordered on 13 August from HM Dockyard, Pembroke, to a modified Rodney class design that was done by the Committee of Reference under Lord John Hay. The ship was intended to measure 207 feet 4 inches (63.2 m) at the gun deck and 170 feet 7 inches (52 m) at the keel. She would have had a beam of 56 feet (17.1 m), a depth of hold of 23 feet 4 inches (7.1 m) and had a tonnage of 2,761 24/94 tons burthen. The ship had the usual three-masted full-ship rig.

=== Screw conversion ===
Completion of the French fast steam-powered, second-rate Napoléon in early 1852 and the French preparations for building more like her caused an invasion scare that prompted the First Derby ministry to authorize a large programme of steam-powered ships of the line to maintain British naval superiority; thus initiating a naval arms race between France and Britain. Captain Baldwin Wake Walker, the Surveyor of the Navy, ordered Caesar to be converted in 1852 in response while she was still under construction. The ship's measurements did not significantly change. She had a deep draught of 22 feet 8 inches (6.91 m). Caesar displaced 3,250 long tons (3,300 t) and had a tonnage of 2,767 tons burthen. The ship was fitted with a two-cylinder, trunk steam engine built by John Penn and Sons. The engine was rated at 400 nominal horsepower and drove a single propeller shaft. Her boilers provided enough steam to give the engine 1,420 indicated horsepower (1,060 kW) that was good for a speed of 10.3 knots (19.1 km/h; 11.9 mph) during her sea trials in Stokes Bay on 3 March 1854. To reduce drag and improve performance under sail, the ship could hoist her propeller into the hull and retract the telescoping funnel. Her crew numbered 860 officers and ratings.

Caesar's muzzle-loading, smoothbore armament consisted of thirty-two 8-inch (203 mm) (65 cwt) shell guns (Note: "Cwt" is the abbreviation for hundredweight, 65 cwt referring to the weight of the gun.) on the lower gun deck. The upper gun deck had thirty-two 56 cwt, 32-pounder guns. Between her forecastle and quarterdeck, the ship carried twenty-six 42 cwt, 32-pounder guns and a single 95 cwt, 68-pounder gun on a pivot mount.

== Construction and career ==
Named to commemorate the Roman general and dictator Julius Caesar, Caesar was the fourth ship of her name to serve in the RN. Her design changed several times before she was laid down in August 1848 as a 90-gun second rate. The Admiralty ordered that she be fitted with screw propulsion while still under construction on 30 October 1852. The conversion began on 22 November and Caesar was launched on 7 August 1853. The ship was commissioned on 21 January 1854 by Captain John Robb and completed on 26 March.

The decisive Russian victory in the Battle of Sinop over the Ottoman Navy on 30 November 1853 alarmed politicians in both Britain and France. They decided to intervene on the side of the Ottomans and the British began forming a Baltic Fleet in February 1854 in anticipation of war. The Russians did not withdraw their forces in the Balkans as demanded by the British and French governments on 27 February and declarations of war by both governments followed a month later. Admiral Sir Charles Napier, commander-in-chief of the Baltic Fleet, was charged to blockade the exit from the Baltic Sea and all of the Russian ports therein. Caesar joined the Baltic Fleet in April. The ship collided with the first rate Royal George in mid-April, but neither ship was significantly damaged. A few days later, Robb was detached with several frigates to reconnoitre Sveaborg in the Aland Islands and Hangö, in the Grand Duchy of Finland. On 22 July Caesar was one of eight ships of the line transferred from the Sveaborg area to blockade the Gulf of Finland. The ship returned to the Baltic for the 1855 campaign season and based at Nargen (modern Naissaar) to blockade the Gulf of Finland by 13 May. The Baltic Fleet withdrew from Seskar on 26 October. Caesar broke her propeller shaft en route and was sent directly home. The ship was one of only two ships of the line to reach the Baltic in 1856 before the Treaty of Paris ended the war in March. She paid off on 7 March 1857.

Caesar was recommissioned at Portsmouth on 14 June 1858 by Captain Charles Frederick and was assigned to the Channel Squadron. The ship's log records Caesar at single anchor in Berehaven (modern Castletownbere), Ireland, on 13 September 1858, and steaming out of Bantry Bay on 18 September. A photograph of Caesar appears on a page in an album associated with Sir John Jocelyn Coghill. A handwritten annotation states that Coghill visited Spain in the autumn of 1858, when four photographs on the page were taken, and that his party reached Gibraltar by Christmas. The annotation does not identify the location of the photograph of Caesar. She subsequently returned to Plymouth and left with the steam frigate HMS Diadem for the West Indies on 21 October. The pair arrived at Port Royal, Jamaica, on 29 November. Casesar subsequently proceeded to Greytown, Nicaragua, and arrived there on 11 December. Diadem and Caesar arrived back in Plymouth on 25 June 1859.

Captain Thomas Henry Mason relieved Frederick on 2 July and Caesar was assigned to the Mediterranean Fleet in October. She returned home to be paid off on 1 February 1862 and was sold to C. J. Mare on 19 April 1870 for breaking up at Blackwall.

== Bibliography ==
- Clowes, William Laird (1901). The Royal Navy: A History from the Earliest Times to the Present. Vol. VI. Sampson Low, Marston.
- Colledge, J. J.; Warlow, Ben & Bush, Steve (2020). Ships of the Royal Navy: The Complete Record of all Fighting Ships of the Royal Navy from the 15th Century to the Present (5th revised and updated ed.). Seaforth Publishing. ISBN 978-1-5267-9327-0.
- Lambert, Andrew D. (1984). Battleships in Transition: The Creation of the Steam Battlefleet 1815-1860. Conway Maritime Press. ISBN 0-85177-315-X.
- Lambert, Andrew (2011) [1990]. The Crimean War: British Grand Strategy Against Russia, 1853–56 (Second ed.). Ashgate. ISBN 978-1-4094-1011-9.
- Lambert, Andrew D. (1991). The Last Sailing Battlefleet: Maintaining Naval Mastery 1815 - 1850. Conway Maritime Press. ISBN 0-85177-591-8.
- Manning, T. D. & Walker, C. F. (1959). British Warship Names. Putnam. OCLC 838607.
- Winfield, Rif (2014). British Warships in the Age of Sail 1817–1863: Design, Construction, Careers and Fates. Seaforth Publishing. ISBN 978-1-84832-169-4.
