= Charles Frederick (Royal Navy officer) =

British Royal Navy officer (1797–1875)

Admiral Charles Frederick
- Born: 7 May 1797
- Died: 23 December 1875 (aged 78)
- Military career
- Allegiance: United Kingdom
- Branch: Royal Navy
- Rank: Admiral
- Commands: HMS Apollo; HMS Amphitrite; HMS President; HMS Caesar; Queenstown
- Conflicts: First Opium War; Crimean War

Admiral Charles Frederick (7 May 1797 – 23 December 1875) was a Royal Navy officer who went on to be Third Naval Lord.

== Naval career ==
Frederick joined the Royal Navy in 1810 and then served in the First Opium War in command of HMS Apollo. Promoted to captain in 1842, he commanded HMS Amphitrite in the Pacific during the Crimean War. He later commanded HMS President and then HMS Caesar.

Promoted to rear-admiral, he was appointed Fourth Naval Lord in 1859 and Third Naval Lord in 1861. His last appointment was as Commander-in-Chief, Queenstown in 1865. Advanced to vice-admiral on 18 October 1867, he retired in 1875.

Although he was never knighted, he brought a lawsuit over the succession to the Frederick Baronetcy in 1873 following the death of the 6th Baronet.

Military offices
| Preceded by Sir Alexander Milne | Fourth Naval Lord; 1859–1861 | Succeeded by Sir James Drummond |
| Preceded by Sir Charles Eden | Third Naval Lord; 1861–1865 | Succeeded by Sir Edward Fanshawe |
| Preceded by Sir Lewis Jones | Commander-in-Chief, Queenstown; 1865–1867 | Succeeded by Claude Buckle |
