= Bulldog-class sloop =

Class overview
- Name: Bulldog-class sloop
- Builders: Chatham Dockyard; Sheerness Dockyard; Pembroke Dockyard; Portsmouth Dockyard
- Operators: Royal Navy
- Preceded by: Driver class
- Succeeded by: Trident class
- Built: 1844–1847
- In commission: 1846–1865
- Completed: 4
- Lost: 4
- Retired: 6

General characteristics
- Type: Steam Vessels (SV2); First Class Sloop
- Tons burthen: 1122 11/94 bm
- Length: 190 ft 0 in (57.9 m) gundeck; 166 ft 0.75 in (50.6 m) keel for tonnage
- Beam: 36 ft 0 in (11.0 m) maximum; 35 ft 8 in (10.9 m) for tonnage
- Depth of hold: 21 ft 0 in (6.4 m)
- Propulsion: 2-cylinder VSE direct acting steam engine; Paddles
- Armament: 2 × 42-pdr (84 cwt) MLSB guns on pivot mounts; 2 × 68-pdr (64 cwt) MLSB guns on broadside trucks; 2 × 42-pdr (22 cwt) carronades

The Bulldog-class steam vessels (SV2) later reclassed as First Class Sloops, were designed by Sir William Symonds, the Surveyor of the Navy. Designed from the Driver class by Admiralty Order of 26 December 1843, the design was approved in 1844. The changes included lengthening the bow by 10 feet to provide 6 feet of extra space in the engine room. Three vessels would have a single funnel whereas Scourge would have two and be completed as a bomb vessel. In July 1844 it was queried if Fury was to be completed as a screw vessel, however, since her construction was well along she would be completed as a paddle steamer. Four vessels were ordered and completed.

Inflexible was the third vessel to carry this name since it was used for an 18-gun sloop, launched by St John's at Lake Champlain on 1 October 1776 and whose fate is unknown.

Scourge was the sixth named vessel since it was used for a 14-gun brig-sloop, launched by Allin of Dover on 26 October 1779, purchased on the stocks and foundered off the Dutch coast on 7 November 1795.

Bulldog was the third vessel so named since it was used for a 16-gun sloop, launched by Ladd of Dover on 10 November 1782, made a bomb in 1798, converted to a powder hulk 1801 Breaking completed at Portsmouth in December 1829. The vessel had been in French hands from 27 February 1801 to 16 September 1801.

Fury was the eighth named vessel since it was used for a 14-gun sloop, launched by Lime & Mackenzie of Leith on 18 March 1779 and broken in April 1787.

== Design and specifications ==
The first three vessels were ordered on 18 March 1841 with the fourth vessel ordered on 19 February 1844. The ships were laid down as follows: Inflexible - January 1844 at Pembroke; Scourge February 1844 at Portsmouth; Bulldog July 1844 at Chatham; and Fury in June 1845 at Sheerness. The vessels were launched between November 1844 and December 1845. The gundeck was 190 feet 0 inches (57.91 metres) with the keel length of 166 feet 0.75 inches (50.62 metres) reported for tonnage. The maximum beam was 36 feet 0 inches (10.97 metres) with 35 feet 8 inches (10.87 metres) reported for tonnage. The depth of hold was 21 feet 0 inches (6.40 metres). The builder's measure calculated at 1122 11/94 tons.

The machinery was supplied by various suppliers. All had rectangular fire-tube boilers installed. The engine manufacturers were as follows:

- Inflexible – supplied by Fawcett, Preston & Company of Liverpool. The engine was a two-cylinder vertical single expansion (VSE) direct-acting steam engine rated at 378 nominal horsepower (NHP). When run on trials the engine generated 680 indicated horsepower (IHP) for a speed of 9.5 knots.
- Scourge – supplied by Maudslay, Sons & Field of Lambeth. The engine was a two-cylinder VSR direct-acting steam engine rated at 420 NHP.
- Bulldog – supplied by J. and G. Rennie of Greenwich. The engine was a two-cylinder VSR direct-acting steam engine rated at 420 NHP then rerated at 500 NHP and had a speed of 10.2 knots.
- Fury – supplied by Rigby of Liverpool. The engine was a two-cylinder VSR direct-acting steam engine rated at 515 NHP for a speed of 10.5 knots.

Their initial armament for Inflexible, Bulldog, and Fury was two 42-pounder 84 hundredweight (cwt) 10-foot muzzle-loading smooth bore (MLSB) guns on pivot mounts with two 68-pounder 64 cwt 9-foot MLSB guns and two 42-pounder 22 cwt carronades on broadside trucks. (Note: "cwt", or "hundredweight" refers to the weight of the gun itself. "68-pounder" refers to the weight of the ball fired) In 1862 the armament was changed to either one 68-pounder 84 cwt 10-foot MLSB gun or one Armstrong 7-inch (110-pounder) rifled breech-loading (RBL) gun on a pivot mount with four 32-pounder 42 cwt MLSB guns on broadside trucks. Scourge being completed as a bomb was armed with one 13-inch mortar with two 68-pounder 95 cwt 10-foot MLSB guns on broadside trucks on the upper deck.

== Initial cost of vessels ==
- Inflexible: Total cost £50,114 (Hull - £22,338; Machinery - £18,458; fitting - £9,418) (Note: A total cost accounting for inflation of approximately £6,129,900 in today's money for Inflexible.)
- Scourge: Total cost £55,002 (Hull - £21,328; Machinery - £20,390; Fitting - £13,284) (Note: A total cost accounting for inflation of approximately £6,727,800 in today's money for Scourge.)
- Bulldog: Total cost £58,122 (including Hull - 23,342; Machinery - £24,892; Fitting - £8,338) (Note: A total cost accounting for inflation of approximately £7,109,400 in today's money for Bulldog.)
- Fury: Total cost £51,688 (Hull - £24,764; Machinery - £22,142; Fitting - £4,782) (Note: A total cost accounting for inflation of approximately £5,966,400 in today's money for Fury.)

Bulldog Class
Name	Builder	Launch date	Remarks
Inflexible	Pembroke Dockyard	22 May 1845	Sold for breaking July 1864
Scourge	Portsmouth Dockyard	9 November 1844	Broken in 1865
Bulldog	Chatham Dockyard	2 October 1845	Blown up 23 October 1865
Fury	Sheerness Dockyard	31 December 1845	Sold in July 1864
