= HMS Inflexible (1845) =

Sloop of the Royal Navy

History

United Kingdom
- Name: HMS Inflexible
- Ordered: 18 March 1841
- Builder: Royal Dockyard, Pembroke
- Cost: £50,114
- Laid down: January 1844
- Launched: 22 May 1845
- Completed: 9 August 1846
- Commissioned: 10 June 1846
- Honours and awards: New Zealand 1847; Crimea/Black Sea 1855; China 1856-1860
- Fate: Sold for breaking July 1864

General characteristics
- Type: Steam Vessels (SV2); First Class Sloop
- Tons burthen: 1122 11/94 bm
- Length: 190 ft 0 in (57.9 m) gundeck; 165 ft 10 in (50.5 m) keel for tonnage
- Beam: 36 ft 0 in (11.0 m) maximum; 35 ft 8 in (10.9 m) for tonnage
- Draught: 7 ft 8 in (2.3 m) forward; 8 ft 1 in (2.5 m) aft
- Depth of hold: 21 ft 0 in (6.4 m)
- Installed power: 378 NHP
- Propulsion: 2-cylinder VSE direct acting steam engine; Paddles
- Armament: 2 × 42-pdr (84 cwt) MLSB guns on pivot mounts; 2 × 68-pdr (64 cwt) MLSB guns on broadside trucks; 2 × 42-pdr (22 cwt) carronades; 1862 Armament change; 1 × 68-pdr 95 cwt or 110=pdr 82 cwt on pivot mount; 4 × 8-inch 52 cwt shell guns on broadside trucks

HMS Inflexible was a Bulldog-class sloop designed by Sir William Symonds, Surveyor of the Navy. Originally she was ordered as a Driver-class sloop, however, under Admiralty Order of 26 December 1843 she was directed to be built to a new specification. After commissioning she sailed for the East Indies and participated in the last year of the New Zealand War of 1845 to 1847. She then was in the Black Sea for the Crimean War followed by the Second Opium War with China. She was sold for breaking in July 1864.

Inflexible was the third vessel to carry this name since it was used for an 18-gun sloop, launched by St John's at Lake Champlain on 1 October 1776 and whose fate is unknown.

== Construction ==
She was ordered on 18 March 1841 from Pembroke Dockyard though her keel was not laid until January 1844. She was launched on 22 May 1845. Following her launch she was towed to Liverpool to have her boilers and machinery fitted. She was then towed to Devonport and was completed for sea on 9 August 1846 at an initial cost of £50,114 including the hull at £22,338, machinery at £18,458 and fitting at £9,418. (Note: A total cost accounting for inflation of approximately £5,051,100 in today's money.)

== Commissioned service ==
=== First commission ===
She was commissioned on 10 June 1846 under the command of Commander John Cochrane Hoseason, RN for service on the East Indies and China Station. She took part in the final year of the New Zealand War of 1845 to 1847. On 30 May 1849 she was in action against Chinese pirate junks at Lemma Island. On 12 July 1850 Commander Peche Hart Dyke, RN took command. By December 1851 she was on the North America and West Indies Station and in June 1852 had joined the Channel Squadron. On 13 July she had been assigned to particular service under the command of Commander George Rhodes Wolridge, RN. By June 1853 she had been assigned to the Mediterranean.

=== Second commission ===
She recommissioned in July 1853 under the command of Commander George Otway Popplewell, RN for service in the Mediterranean and the Black Sea. She was involved in the attack on Fort Nicoaiev on 4 October 1854. She was paid off on 15 August 1855.

=== Third commission ===
She was commissioned on 28 July 1856 for service on the East Indies and China Station under the command of Commander John Corbett, RN. she was in action with boats at Fatshan on 1 June 1857. on 15 August she came under the command of Commander George Augustus Cooke Brooker, RN. She participated in the destruction of pirate junks at Coulan in August and September 1858. She returned to home waters and paid off on 27 April 1861.

== Disposition ==
She was sold to Castle & Beech in July 1864 then towed from Portsmouth on 8 September 1864 to Charlton for breaking.
