= HMS Cormorant (1842) =

Sloop of the Royal Navy

- The "Cormorant" at anchor, destroying the slave-brigs "Serea" and "Donna Anna" (The Illustrated London News, 1850)

History

United Kingdom
- Name: HMS Cormorant
- Ordered: 18 March 1841
- Builder: Sheerness Dockyard
- Cost: £44,898
- Laid down: 17 May 1841
- Launched: 13 January 1842
- Commissioned: 8 February 1843
- Fate: Broken up on 17 August 1853

General characteristics
- Class & type: Driver-class wooden paddle sloop
- Displacement: 1,590 tons
- Tons burthen: 1,055 62/94 bm
- Length: 180 ft (54.9 m)
- Beam: 36 ft (11.0 m)
- Depth of hold: 21 ft (6.4 m)
- Installed power: 280 nhp
- Propulsion: William Fairbairn 2-cylinder direct-acting steam engine; Paddles
- Sail plan: Brig-rigged
- Complement: 149 (later 160)
- Armament: 2 × 10-inch/42-pounder (84 cwt) pivot guns; 2 × 68-pounder guns (64 cwt); 2 × 42-pounder (22 cwt) guns

HMS Cormorant was a Driver-class wooden paddle sloop of the Royal Navy that operated from 1843 to 1853.
