= HMS Geyser =

Sloop of the Royal Navy

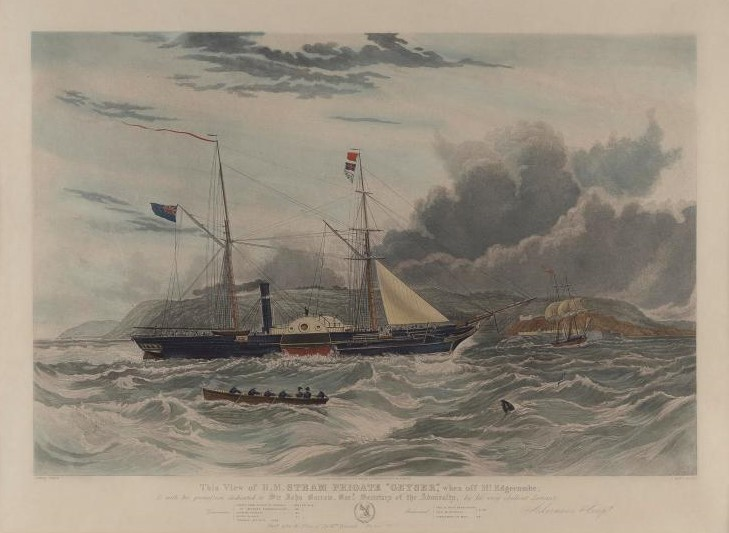
- Geyser, when off Mount Edgecombe, by Charles Hunt

History

United Kingdom
- Name: HMS Geyser
- Ordered: 12 March 1840
- Builder: Pembroke Dockyard
- Laid down: Aug 1840
- Launched: 6 April 1841
- Commissioned: 8 March 1842
- Fate: Broken up 1866

General characteristics
- Class & type: Driver-class wooden paddle sloop
- Displacement: 1,590 tons
- Tons burthen: 1,055 62/94 bm
- Length: 180 ft (54.9 m) (gundeck)
- Beam: 36 ft (11.0 m)
- Depth of hold: 21 ft (6.4 m)
- Installed power: 280 nhp
- Propulsion: Seaward & Capel 2-cylinder direct-acting steam engine; Paddles
- Sail plan: Brig-rigged
- Complement: 149 (later 160)
- Armament: As built: 2 × 10-inch/42-pounder (84 cwt) pivot guns; 2 × 68-pounder guns (64 cwt); 2 × 42-pounder (22 cwt) guns; After 1856: 1 × 110 pdr Armstrong gun; 1 × 68-pounder (95 cwt) gun; 4 × 32-pounder (42 cwt) guns

HMS Geyser was a Driver-class wooden paddle sloop of the Royal Navy constructed in 1841 and broken up in 1866.

== Design and construction ==
Geyser was ordered on 12 March 1840 as the fourth of a class of six second-class steam vessels. (Note: A further 10 were ordered in May 1840, and eventually 12 in total were finished as Driver-class sloops; Rattler became a screw sloop and Bulldog, Inflexible and Scourge were lengthened to become the Bulldog class.) She was laid down in August 1840 and launched on 6 April 1841. She was 180 feet (54.9 m) long on the gundeck and displaced 1,590 tons. Power for her paddles came from a Seaward & Capel 2-cylinder direct-acting steam engine developing 280 nominal horsepower, which was fitted at Woolwich in May 1841. (Note: Driver and Geyser arrived at Woolwich on 6 May 1841 together to have their engines fitted at the Limehouse yard of Seaward and Capel.) Having conducted engine trials in the River Thames, she left Woolwich for Sheerness on 31 October 1841 to be coppered and made ready for sea. She was commissioned for the first time at Sheerness on 8 March 1842.

== Service history ==
She served in the Mediterranean and the Levant in 1846. By December 1848 she was at the Cape of Good Hope. On 16 February 1850 she rescued the survivors of the barque Childe Harold, a passenger ship homeward bound from Australia. Childe Harold had struck the south east point of Dassen Island on the West Coast of South Africa. The only fatality was the Master, James Byres, who drowned while attempting to swim ashore with a line.

She spent much of 1851 conducting anti-slavery patrols off the coast of Brazil. On 11 February 1851 she captured the slave brig Mangano in the vicinity of Rio de Janeiro. The slaver was sent for adjudication to the Vice-Admiralty Court at St. Helena, and in June 1851 she was sentenced to be restored to her master without costs.

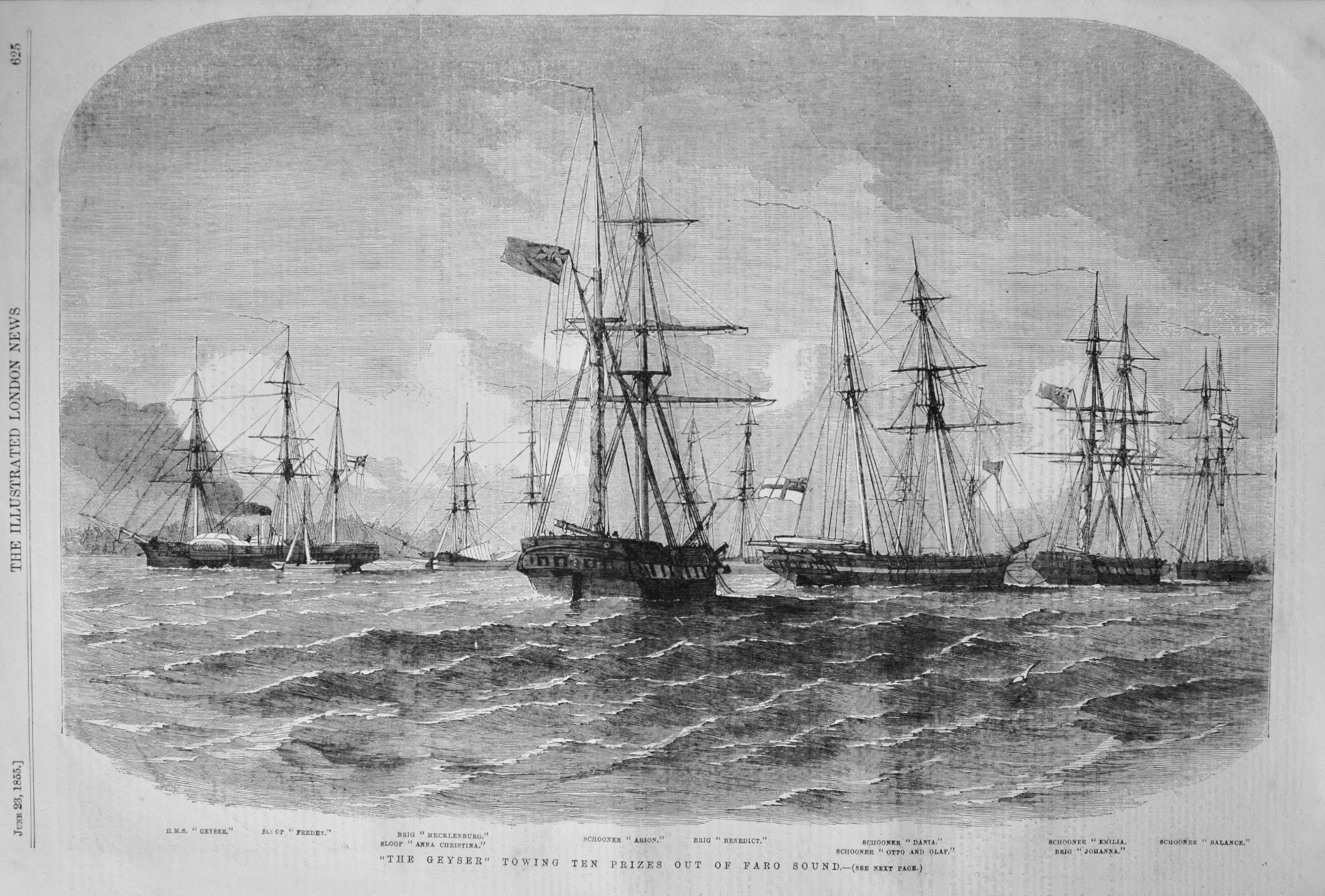
The Geyser towing Ten Prizes out of Faro Sound in 1855. The Illustrated London News.

She was present at the Fleet Review at Spithead on 23 April 1856, and in 1857 was at Simon's Town in South Africa for patrols off the East Coast of Africa. On 23 June 1860 she was recommissioned at Devonport for service on the Home Station as a storeship. She was driven against the quayside in a gale at Plymouth on 14 January 1865 and was damaged.

== Fate ==
Geyser was broken up in 1866.
