= HMS Growler (1841) =

Sloop of the Royal Navy

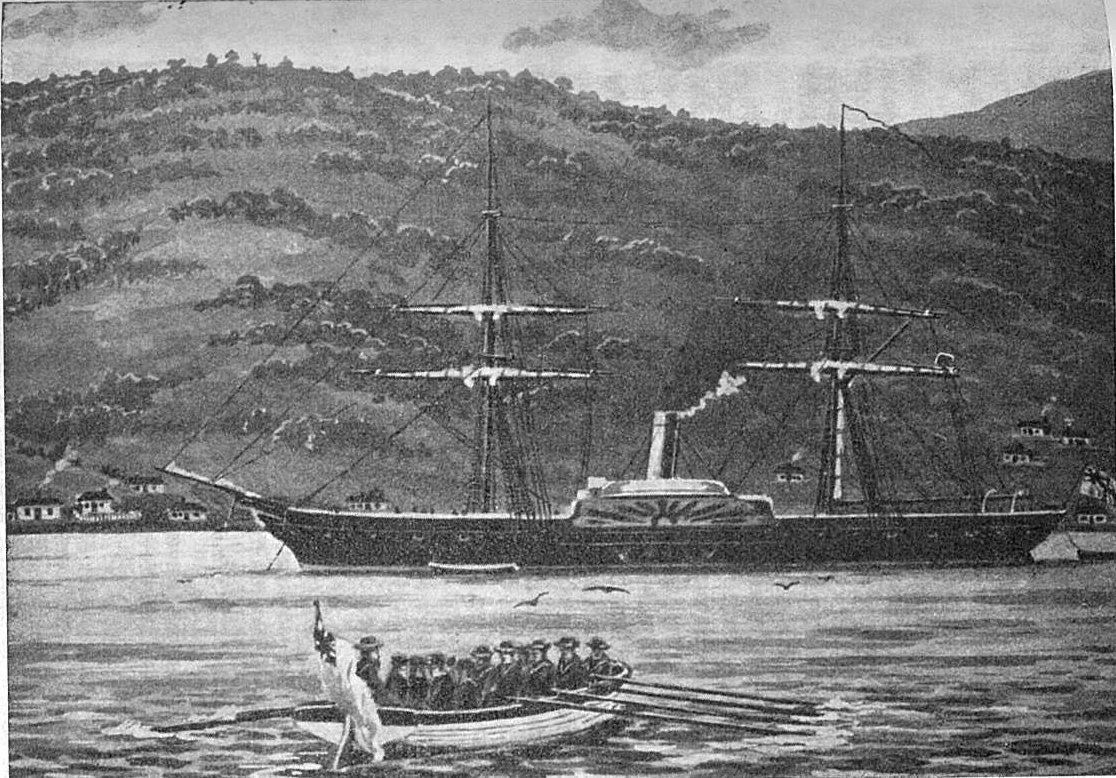
- Sister-ship, HMS Driver

History

United Kingdom
- Name: HMS Growler
- Builder: Chatham Dockyard
- Cost: £39,461
- Laid down: January 1841
- Launched: 20 July 1841
- Commissioned: 9 March 1842
- Fate: Broken up at Portsmouth by January 1854

General characteristics
- Class & type: Driver-class wooden paddle sloop
- Displacement: 1,590 tons
- Tons burthen: 1,05562/94 bm
- Length: 180 ft (54.9 m) (gundeck)
- Beam: 36 ft (11.0 m)
- Depth of hold: 21 ft (6.4 m)
- Installed power: 280 nhp
- Propulsion: Seaward & Capel 2-cylinder direct-acting steam engine; Paddles
- Sail plan: Brig-rigged
- Complement: 149 (later 160)
- Armament: As built: 2 × 10-inch/42-pounder (84 cwt) pivot guns; 2 × 68-pounder guns (64 cwt); 2 × 42-pounder (22 cwt) guns; After 1856: 1 × 110 pdr Armstrong gun; 1 × 68-pounder (95 cwt) gun; 4 × 32-pounder (42 cwt) guns

HMS Growler was a paddle-driven Driver-class sloop, built in 1841 and broken up in 1854. In 1847 she carried liberated Africans to Sierra Leone for resettlement.

== Construction and commissioning ==
Growler was ordered under PW1840 along with other Driver-class paddle sloops, laid down at Chatham Dockyard and launched on 20 July 1841. She was completed at Chatham and commissioned on 9 March 1842.

== Service history ==
On 31 March 1842, Growler was assigned to the South East Coast of America Station to combat the slave trade. She was reassigned to the West Africa Squadron in September 1844.

On 21 July 1844 Growler captured the Spanish brigantine Veterano. Then on 23 September 1844 Growler captured the Spanish slave schooner Concepcion. (Note: A first class share of the bounty money for Veterano was worth £59 1s 0½d; a sixth-class share was worth £3 18s 8½d. For Concepcion a first-class share was worth £6 17s 11d; a sixth-class share was worth 9s 2d.)

In February 1845 she took part in Commodore William Jones's destruction of several barracoons at Dombocorro and elsewhere.

The ship was involved in a scheme to relocate liberated Africans from Sierra Leone to the Caribbean, arriving in Trinidad in December 1847. One hundred and fifty men, 37 women and 254 children former captives survived the journey, although 45 Africans died on the journey.

== Fate ==
Growler was broken up at Portsmouth, which was completed by 17 January 1854.
