= HMS Driver (1840) =

Sloop of the Royal Navy

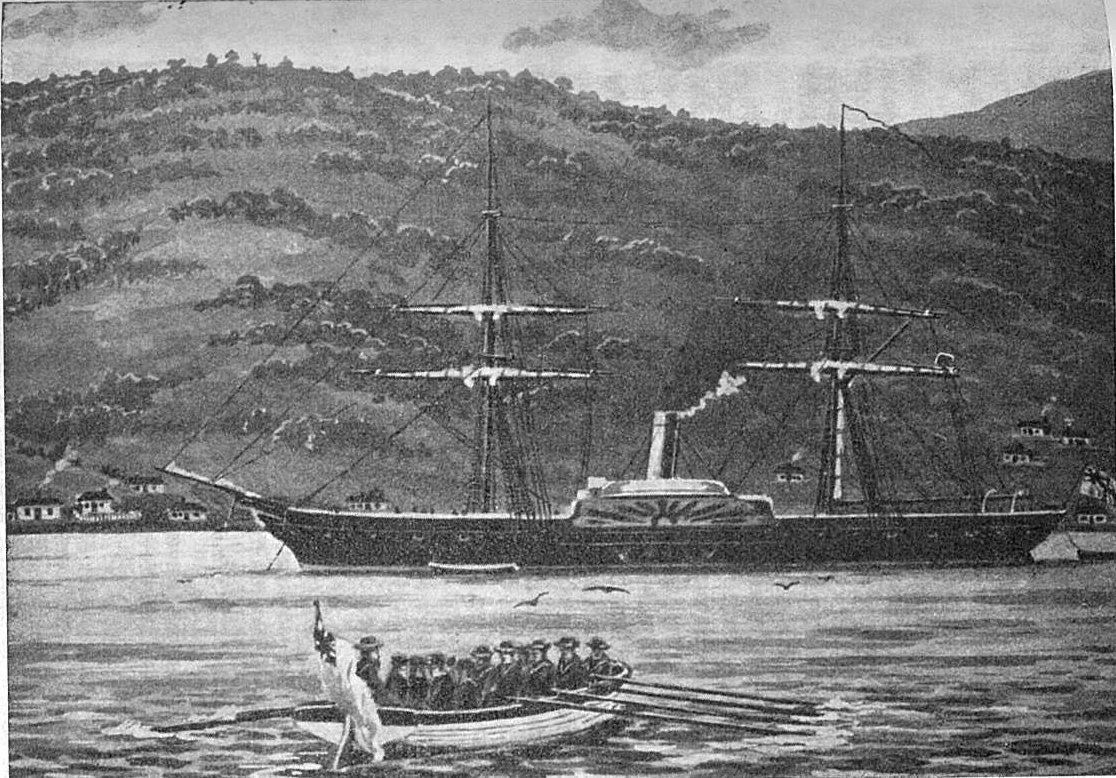
- HMS Driver

History

United Kingdom
- Name: HMS Driver
- Ordered: 12 March 1840
- Builder: Portsmouth Dockyard
- Cost: £39,707
- Laid down: June 1840
- Launched: 24 December 1840
- Commissioned: 5 November 1841
- Fate: Wrecked on 3 August 1861

General characteristics
- Class & type: Driver-class wooden paddle sloop
- Displacement: 1,590 tons
- Tons burthen: 1,055 62/94 bm
- Length: 180 ft (54.9 m) (gundeck)
- Beam: 36 ft (11.0 m)
- Depth of hold: 21 ft (6.4 m)
- Installed power: 280 nhp
- Propulsion: Seaward & Capel 2-cylinder direct-acting steam engine; Paddles
- Sail plan: Brig-rigged
- Complement: 149 (later 160)
- Armament: As built: 2 × 10-inch/42-pounder (84 cwt) pivot guns; 2 × 68-pounder guns (64 cwt); 2 × 42-pounder (22 cwt) guns; After 1856: 1 × 110 pdr Armstrong gun; 1 × 68-pounder (95 cwt) gun; 4 × 32-pounder (42 cwt) guns

HMS Driver was a Driver-class wooden paddle sloop of the Royal Navy. She is credited with the first global circumnavigation by a steamship when she arrived back in England on 14 May 1847.

== Construction and commissioning ==
Driver was ordered on 12 March 1840 from Portsmouth Dockyard to a design by Sir William Symonds. She was laid down in June 1840 and launched on 24 December 1840, with her machinery being supplied by Seaward & Capel of Limehouse, Woolwich. Her hull cost £19,433, with the machinery costing another £13,866. After she had completed fitting out, at a further cost of £6,408, she was commissioned on 5 November 1841.

== Career ==
Driver was driven ashore at Steel Point, Yorkshire, on 28 November 1841, and was later refloated. She embarked for the East Indies and China in March 1842. She served some time in China (losing her original commanding officer) before being ordered to New Zealand in September 1845. She was damaged by a storm en route, necessitating repairs to her engine and boiler and other parts of the ship.

During her circumnavigation Driver became the first steamship to visit New Zealand, arriving on 20 January 1846, and was involved in the Hutt Valley Campaign, which was part of the New Zealand Wars. At the time of her visit she was described as a brig-rigged 6-gun warship displacing 1,058 tons with engines rated 280 horsepower.

Driver set off east from New Zealand for her return journey to England via Cape Horn on 28 January 1847. She stopped for six days in Argentina to pick up more coal, finally arriving in Portsmouth, England on Friday 14 May 1847, 105 days after starting from New Zealand. Of the ship's original officers, the second in command Lieutenant Thomas Kisbee, the master, purser, surgeon and assistant surgeon completed the entire circumnavigation.

On 11 March 1850 she was docked in Victoria Harbour to witness Richard Blanshard assume the Governorship of the newly formed Colony of Vancouver Island, and issued a seventeen-gun salute.

== Fate ==
She was wrecked on 3 August 1861 on Mayaguana Island, the most easterly of the Bahamas, in the West Indies, during a voyage from Bermuda to Jamaica.
