= USCS Vanderbilt =

History

United States
- Name: Vanderbilt
- Completed: 1842
- Commissioned: 1842
- Decommissioned: 1855

General characteristics
- Type: Schooner; Survey ship
- Length: 47.6 ft (14.5 m)
- Beam: 15.4 ft (4.7 m)
- Draft: 3.6 ft (1.1 m)
- Propulsion: Sails
- Sail plan: Schooner-rigged

USCS Vanderbilt was a schooner that served as a survey ship in the United States Coast Survey from 1842 to 1855.

Vanderbilt was built in 1842 and entered service with the Coast Survey that year. She spent her career along the United States East Coast.

Vanderbilt was retired in 1855.
