= HMS Imperieuse (1852) =

Frigate of the Royal Navy

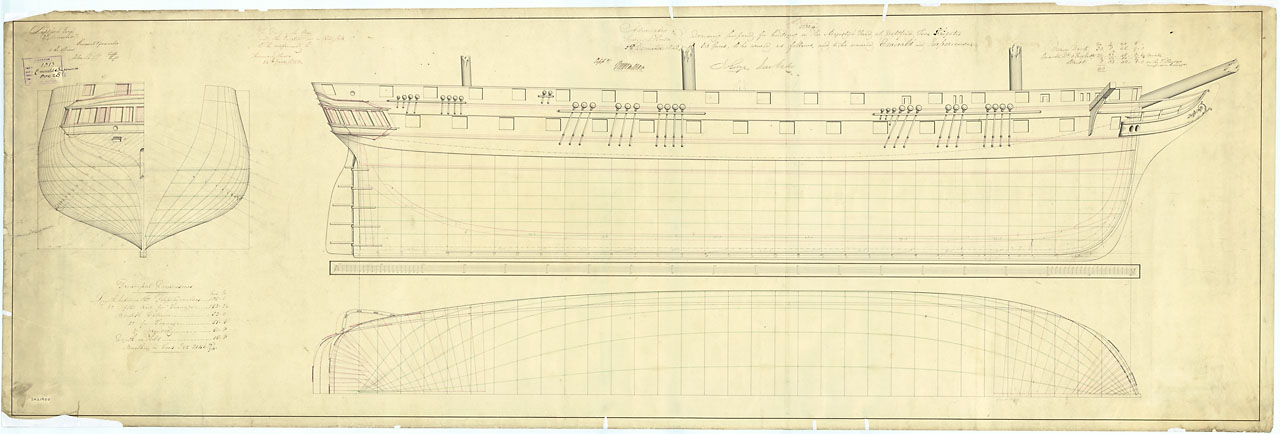
- Imperieuse

History

United Kingdom
- Name: Imperieuse
- Builder: Deptford Dockyard
- Launched: 15 September 1852
- Honours and awards: Baltic 1854–1855; China 1860
- Fate: Sold, March 1867

General characteristics
- Type: Steam frigate
- Tons burthen: 2,358 tons bm
- Length: 148 ft 6 in (45.26 m)
- Beam: 39 ft 6 in (12.04 m)
- Armament: 10 × 8 in (200 mm) guns; 1 × 68-pounder gun; 40 × 32-pounder guns

HMS Imperieuse was a wooden screw steam frigate launched in 1852.

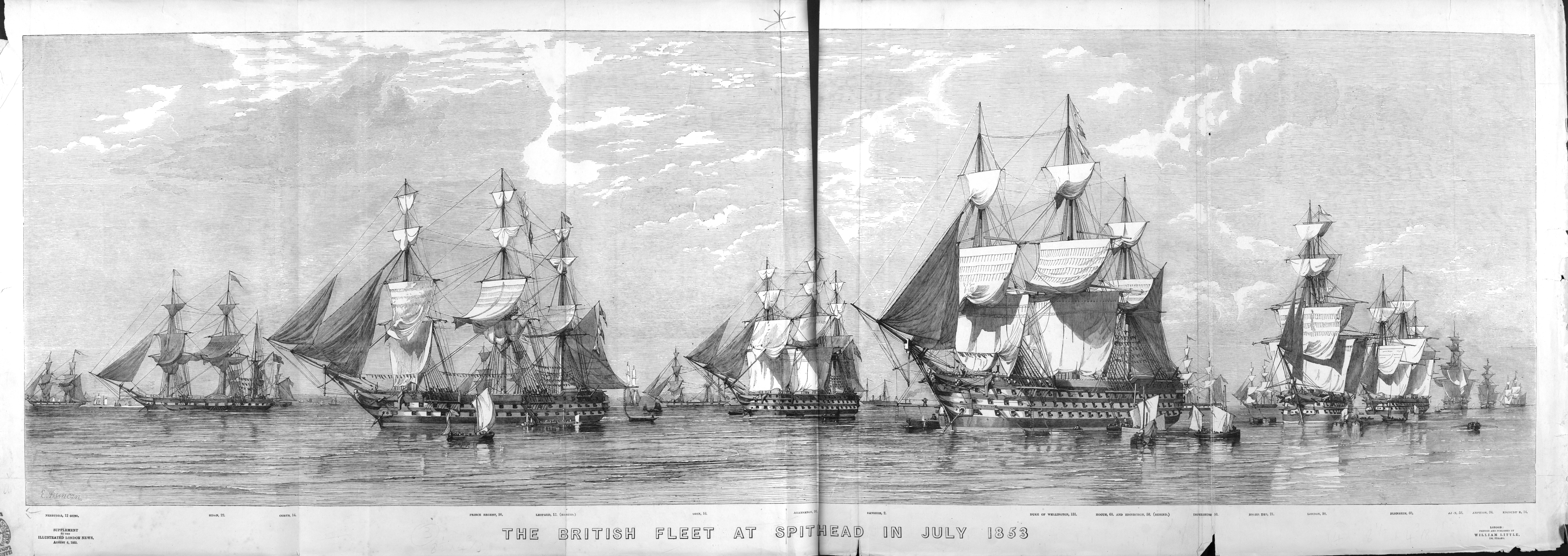
Imperieuse at the Spithead Fleet Review on 15 July 1853

From 1854 the ship served in the Baltic Sea during the Crimean War.

On 1 April 1855, Imperieuse ran aground off the Reefness Lighthouse (Røsnæs lighthouse), in Kalundborg, Denmark. She was refloated the next day with assistance from HMS Euryalus. In August 1855 Captain Watson was in charge when she was present at Cronstadt, the Russian Baltic naval base; along with James Watt, Centaur and Bulldog The fleet was involved in a minor long-range Crimean War engagement near the Tolbukhin lighthouse with the port's batteries and gun-boats on 16 August 1855.

In January 1860 she arrived at Hong Kong on the East Indies and China Station, where she remained for the next two years, operating off the coast of China during the Second Anglo-Chinese War of 1856–1860.

In August 1861, she ran aground on a rock 140 nautical miles (260 km) from Jeddo, Japan. She was refloated three days later with assistance from HMS Ringdove. The ship was sold in March 1867.

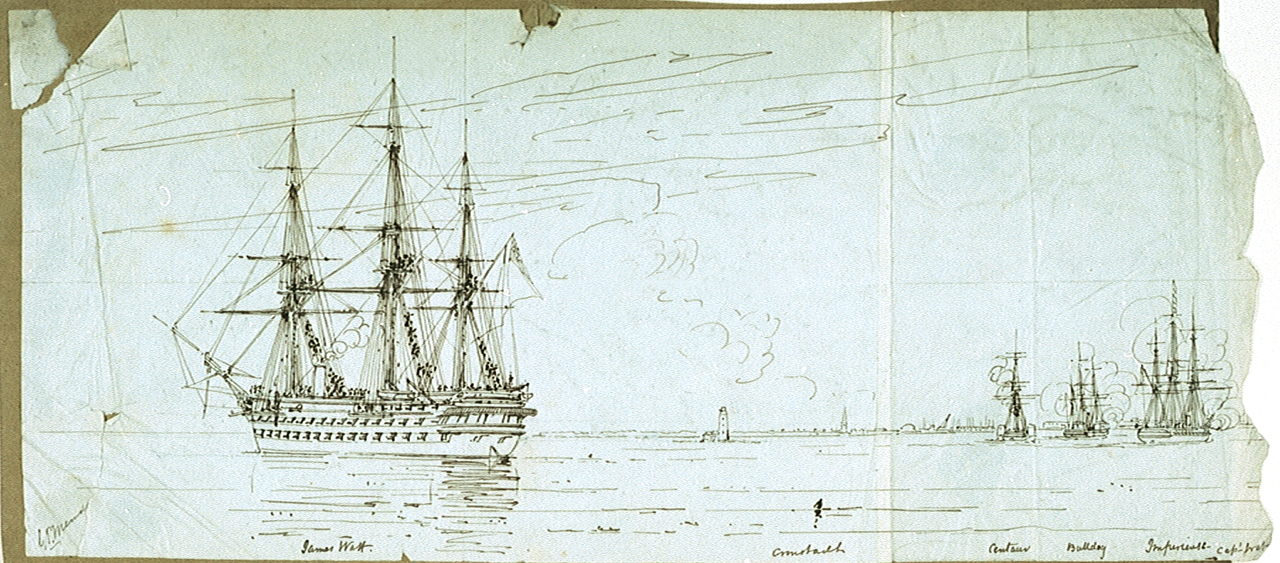
HMS James Watt off Kronstadt, with Centaur, Bulldog and Imperieuse in action near the Tolbukhin lighthouse, August 1855
