= Driver-class sloop =

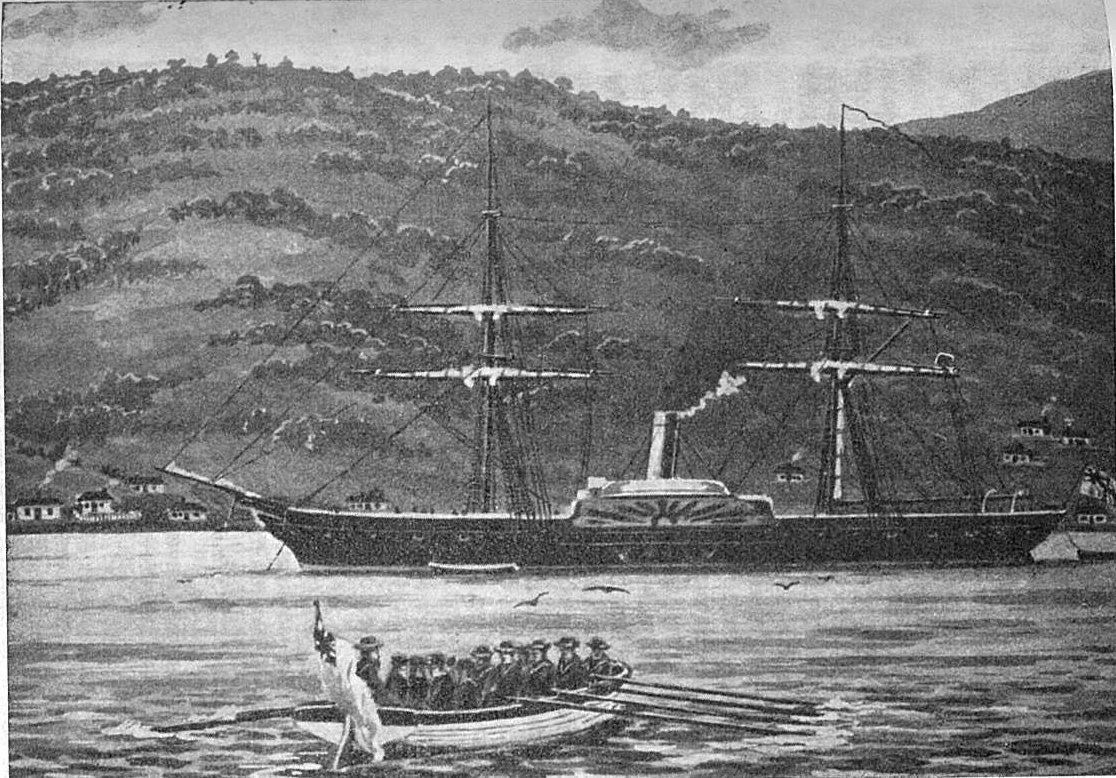
- HMS Driver

Class overview
- Name: Driver-class paddle sloop
- Operators: Royal Navy
- Preceded by: Alecto class
- Succeeded by: Bulldog class
- Cost: Driver: £39,707 (Note: A total cost accounting for inflation of approximately £4,515,800 in today's money.)
- Built: 1840-1846
- In commission: 1841–1870s
- Completed: 12
- Retired: 12

General characteristics
- Type: Wooden paddle sloop
- Displacement: 1,590 tons
- Tons burthen: 1,055 62/94 bm
- Length: 180 ft (54.9 m) (gundeck)
- Beam: 36 ft (11.0 m)
- Depth of hold: 21 ft (6.4 m)
- Installed power: 280–300 nhp (except Devastation and Sphinx)
- Propulsion: 2-cylinder direct-acting steam engine (except Spiteful, Devastation and Sphinx); Paddles
- Sail plan: Brig-rigged
- Complement: 149 (later 160)
- Armament: As built: 2 × 10-inch/42-pounder (84 cwt) pivot guns; 2 × 68-pounder (64 cwt) guns; 2 × 42-pounder (22 cwt) carronades; After 1856: 1 × 10-inch/42-pounder (84 cwt) pivot guns; 1 × 68-pounder (95 cwt) gun; 4 × 32-pounder (42 cwt) guns; Later: 1 × 10-inch/42-pounder (84 cwt) pivot guns; 1 × 110 pdr Armstrong gun; 4 × 32-pounder (42 cwt) guns

The Driver class were a class of paddlewheel steam sloops of the British Royal Navy. Six Driver-class ships were ordered in 1840 and a further ten in March 1841, although only six were built. Five were ordered in 1847, but all were either built as paddle frigates or cancelled. Two wrecked in service, while the rest served until being retired and were either broken up or sold.

== Design ==
The ships were designed by Sir William Symonds. They were built of wood, displaced 1,590 tons and had a length on the gundeck of 180 feet (54.9 m).

=== Propulsion ===
Power was provided by a two-cylinder direct-acting steam engine driving paddle wheels. Spiteful had a side-lever steam engine, Devastation had a 4-cylinder 'Siamese' steam engine and Sphinx had a 2-cylinder oscillating steam engine. The engines developed between 280 and 300 nominal horsepower, apart from Devastation (400 nhp) and Sphinx (500 nhp). All the ships were capable of about 9 knots (17 km/h) under steam, with the more powerful Devastation and Sphinx making 10 or 12 knots. A brig rig was fitted for operating under sail.

=== Armament ===
All three ships were armed with two 10 in (250 mm) (84 cwt) guns on pivot mounts, two 68-pounder (64 cwt) guns and two 42-pounder (22 cwt) carronades. (Note: "cwt", or "hundredweight" refers to the weight of the gun itself. "42-pounder" refers to the weight of the ball fired.) In 1856 the armament was changed to a single 10-inch pivot gun, a 68-pounder (95 cwt) gun and four 32-pounder (42 cwt) guns. Later, the 68-pounder was replaced by a 110 pdr Armstrong gun breech-loading gun.

=== Crew ===
They had a complement of approximately 149 men, increasing later to 160.

=== Construction ===
Six Driver-class ships were ordered in 1840 and a further ten in March 1841, although only six were built. Five were ordered in 1847, but all were either built as paddle frigates or cancelled.

== Ships ==
Name	Ship builder	Laid down	Launched	Commissioned	Fate
Driver	Portsmouth Dockyard	June 1840	24 December 1840	5 November 1841	Wrecked on Mayaguana Island in the Bahamas on 3 August 1861
Styx	Sheerness Dockyard	22 June 1840	26 January 1841	4 October 1841	Broken up 1866
Vixen	Pembroke Dockyard	June 1840	4 February 1841	28 December 1841	Broken up 12 November 1862
Devastation	Woolwich Dockyard	27 July 1840	3 July 1841	30 November 1841	Broken up September 1866
Geyser	Pembroke Dockyard	August 1840	6 April 1841	8 March 1842	Broken up 1866
Growler	Chatham Dockyard	January 1841	20 July 1841	9 March 1842	Broken up at Portsmouth by January 1854
Thunderbolt	Portsmouth Dockyard	April 1841	13 January 1842	8 February 1843	Wrecked on Cape Recife, Algoa Bay, South Africa 3 February 1847
Cormorant	Sheerness Dockyard	17 May 1841	29 March 1842	28 June 1843	Broken up at Deptford by August 1853
Spiteful	Pembroke Dockyard	August 1841	24 March 1842	24 March 1843	Sold September 1883
Eclair	Woolwich Dockyard	August 1841	31 May 1843	9 September 1844	Originally Infernal (renamed 26 August 1844 before commissioning. Renamed Rosamund 14 October 1846. Floating factory 1863. Broken up 1865
Virago	Chatham Dockyard	15 November 1841	25 July 1842	29 July 1843	Broken up at Chatham November 1876
Sphinx	Woolwich Dockyard	May 1844	17 February 1845	3 November 1846	Broken up at Devonport September 1881
Rattler	-	-	-	-	Ordered 1841, but changed to Alecto-class sloop, then re-ordered as the screw sloop Rattler
Bulldog	-	-	-	-	Design lengthened, becoming the first ship of the Bulldog class
Inflexible	-	-	-	-	Built as Bulldog class
Scourge	-	-	-	-	Built as Bulldog class
Furious	-	-	-	-	Ordered in 1847 but then re-ordered as a paddle frigate
Magicienne	-	-	-	-	Ordered in 1847 but then re-ordered as a paddle frigate
Resolute	-	-	-	-	Ordered in 1847 but then re-ordered as a paddle frigate and finally cancelled in 1850
Tiger	-	-	-	-	Ordered in 1847 but then re-ordered as a paddle frigate
Valorous	-	-	-	-	Ordered in 1847 but then re-ordered as a paddle frigate
