= Early naval vessels of New Zealand =

A range of naval vessels were used in New Zealand from its early settlement years to the formation of the New Zealand Naval Forces in 1913. In the mid-19th century, these vessels included frigates, sloops, schooners, and steam-driven paddlewheel boats. In 1846, five years after New Zealand was first proclaimed a colony, it bought its first gunboat. In the 1840s and 1850s, steam boats were used to survey the ports and the coastline. In the 1860s, New Zealand established the Waikato flotilla, its first de facto navy.

By the late 19th century, New Zealand was using cruisers and torpedo boats. In the 1880s, in response to the Russian scares, coastal defences were established, a mine-laying steamer was ordered, and spar torpedo boats began patrolling the main ports. In 1911, New Zealand funded the construction of a battlecruiser, and in 1913, the New Zealand Naval Forces were created as a separate division within the Royal Navy.

== Early settlers ==
=== Polynesian settlers ===
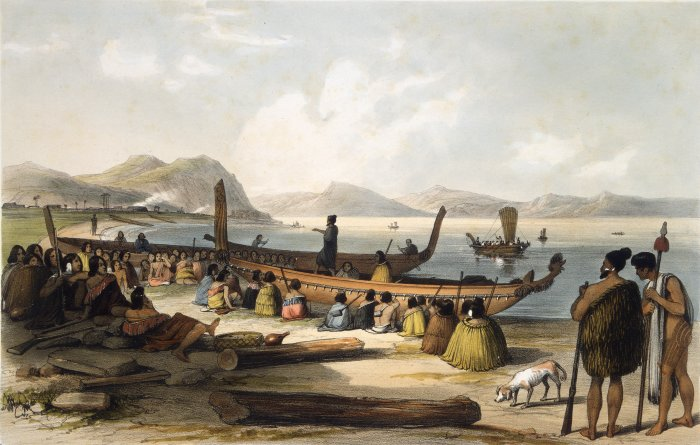
Waka taua (war canoes) at the Bay of Islands, 1827-8

The initial settlement of New Zealand occurred around 1280 CE when it was discovered by Polynesians who arrived in oceangoing canoes, or waka. The descendants of these settlers became known as the Māori, forming a distinct culture centred on kinship links and land. The earliest war boats to operate in New Zealand were the large decorated war canoes or waka taua of the Māori. These could be over 30 metres long and were manned by up to 100 paddlers. It was a double hulled waka that rammed the ship's boat of Abel Tasman enabling Māori to board and kill 4 sailors. Waka taua were used to transport warriors to and from battle especially during the Musket War period 1805 to 1843. Less often battles were fought at sea. In late 1863 many waka on the Waikato River were destroyed by New Zealand militia to prevent rebelling Māori from attacking Auckland. Settlers were annoyed that the waka had not been destroyed earlier in the war. This had allowed rebelling Kingitanga Māori from the Waikato to cross into Auckland and murder a total of 18 settlers living on the outskirts of Auckland. Waka taua are no longer used in warfare, but they are still built and used for ceremonial purposes. Replica waka taua are built in traditional wood, fibreglass and plastic.

=== European settlers ===
The first European known to reach New Zealand was the Dutch explorer Abel Tasman, who arrived with his ships Heemskerck and Zeehaen in 1642. Over 100 years later, in 1769, the British naval captain James Cook of HM Bark Endeavour made the first of his three visits. From the late 18th century, the country was increasingly visited by British, French and American whaling, sealing and trading ships. In 1841 New Zealand became a British colony followed by a period of wars. New Zealand gradually became more self-governing and achieved the relative independence of a dominion in 1907.

In 1788 the colony of New South Wales was founded with a commission that technically included responsibility for New Zealand. In practice this had little consequence, since the New South Wales administration was not really interested in New Zealand. From the 1790s the New Zealand coast was increasingly visited by explorers, traders and adventurers. They traded European goods, including guns and metal tools, for food, water, wood, flax and sex. European settlement increased through the early decades of the 19th century, establishing trading stations and buying land from the Māori. However different concepts of land ownership led to increasing conflict and bitterness. Missionaries were also settling, attempting to convert Māori to Christianity and control European lawlessness.

In 1839, the New Zealand Company announced plans to establish colonies in New Zealand. This alarmed the missionaries, who called for more British control. Captain William Hobson was sent to New Zealand to persuade Māori to cede their sovereignty to the British Crown. On 6 February 1840, Hobson and Māori chiefs signed the Treaty of Waitangi at Waitangi in the Bay of Islands.

== Surveying the coast ==
The first general charting of the New Zealand coast was done with great competence by Cook on his first visit in 1769. The chart was published in 1772 and remained current for 66 years.

By 1840 several Royal Navy ships were engaged in hydrographic surveys directed by the Admiralty. Captain Owen Stanley, on HMS Britomart, drew up an Admiralty chart of the Waitematā Harbour. The Britomart was a Cherokee-class brig-sloop of the Royal Navy. In this survey, he named Britomart Point after his ship. Stanley was a talented painter, but he seemed to suffer from a temporary lack of invention when he named another prominent point the Second Point. Today this is called Stanley Point.

A detailed survey of the New Zealand coast was essential for economic development and in 1848 HMS Acheron, a steam paddle sloop, began the "Great Survey". HMS Pandora took over and continued until 1856, when the harbours and most of the coast had been freshly surveyed. In the 1890s until 1905, HMS Penguin updated the surveys.

== New Zealand Wars ==
From 1840 immigration, mainly from the United Kingdom, increased markedly. New Zealand became a colony of Britain in its own right on 3 May 1841, and the New Zealand Constitution Act 1852 established central and provincial governments.

As more European immigrants (Pākehā) arrived, the pressure on the indigenous Māori to sell land increased. Māori initially welcomed Pākehā for the trading opportunities and the opportunity to learn new technologies, but by the late 1850s some Māori began to resent the loss of their autonomy. The Hapū (sub-tribes) who willingly sold their land by the late 1850s were refusing to sell and putting pressure on other Māori to do the same. Some tribes such at Ngāi Tahu in the South Island sold vast areas of land. For Māori, land (whenua) was not just an economic resource but the basis of their identity and a connection with their ancestors. Land was normally in the control of the chiefs of hapū. Land sale records show that hapū and their leaders still willingly sold land to the government. Pākehā, especially from 1860, were keen to buy more land. This clashed with the decision of the militant Kingitanga Māori in the Waikato to refuse to sell.

This refusal to sell land and an attempt to set up an independent Kingitanga state was seen as rebellion by the government and was the primary cause of the New Zealand Wars in the 1860s, when the Taranaki and Waikato regions were scenes of conflict between the New Zealand government supported by British troops, colonial troops, local militia and loyal (kupapa) Māori fighting against the rebelling Kingite Māori. On their defeat in 1864 the Māori rebels forfeited some of their land. 3% of New Zealand's land was taken, although large areas of this were reserved for Māori and some of the land was never surveyed or occupied and subsequently returned to Māori. Defeat of the rebels was aided by the large flotilla of vessels brought to New Zealand by General Cameron in 1863 to operate in the Waikato River. The flotilla comprised shallow draught boats, including gunboats and barges for transporting troops and supplies, as the front line moved progressively south. Many of these vessels were sourced from Australia and captained by experienced Australian officers. Cameron also opened a second maritime link by bringing troops and supplies over the Raglan bar and building a redoubt at Raglan. Troops were marched over an old Māori trail that was widened by the Forest Rangers to allow access to the area north of Pirongia.

=== Royal Navy ===
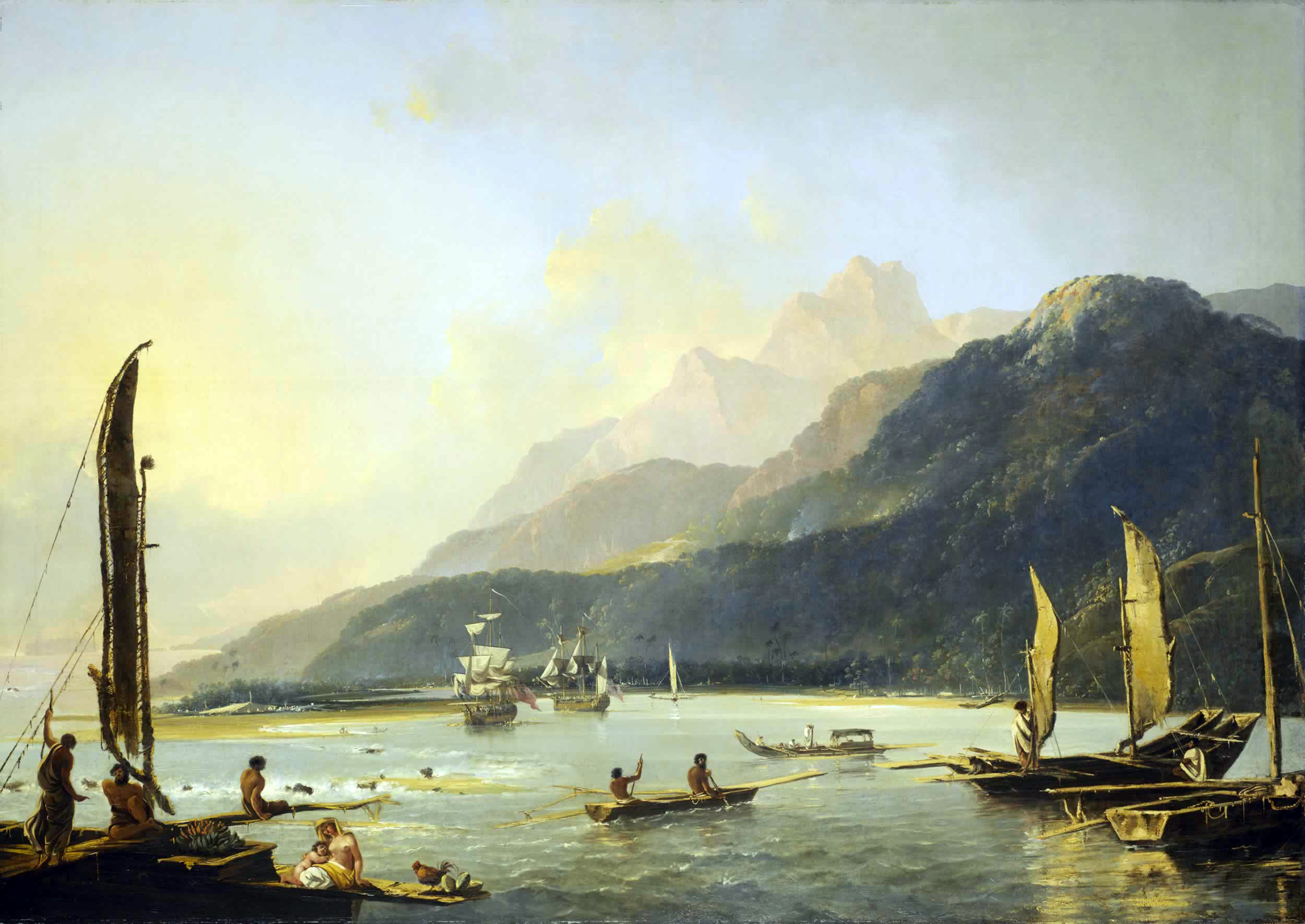
Resolution and Adventure at Tahiti in 1773

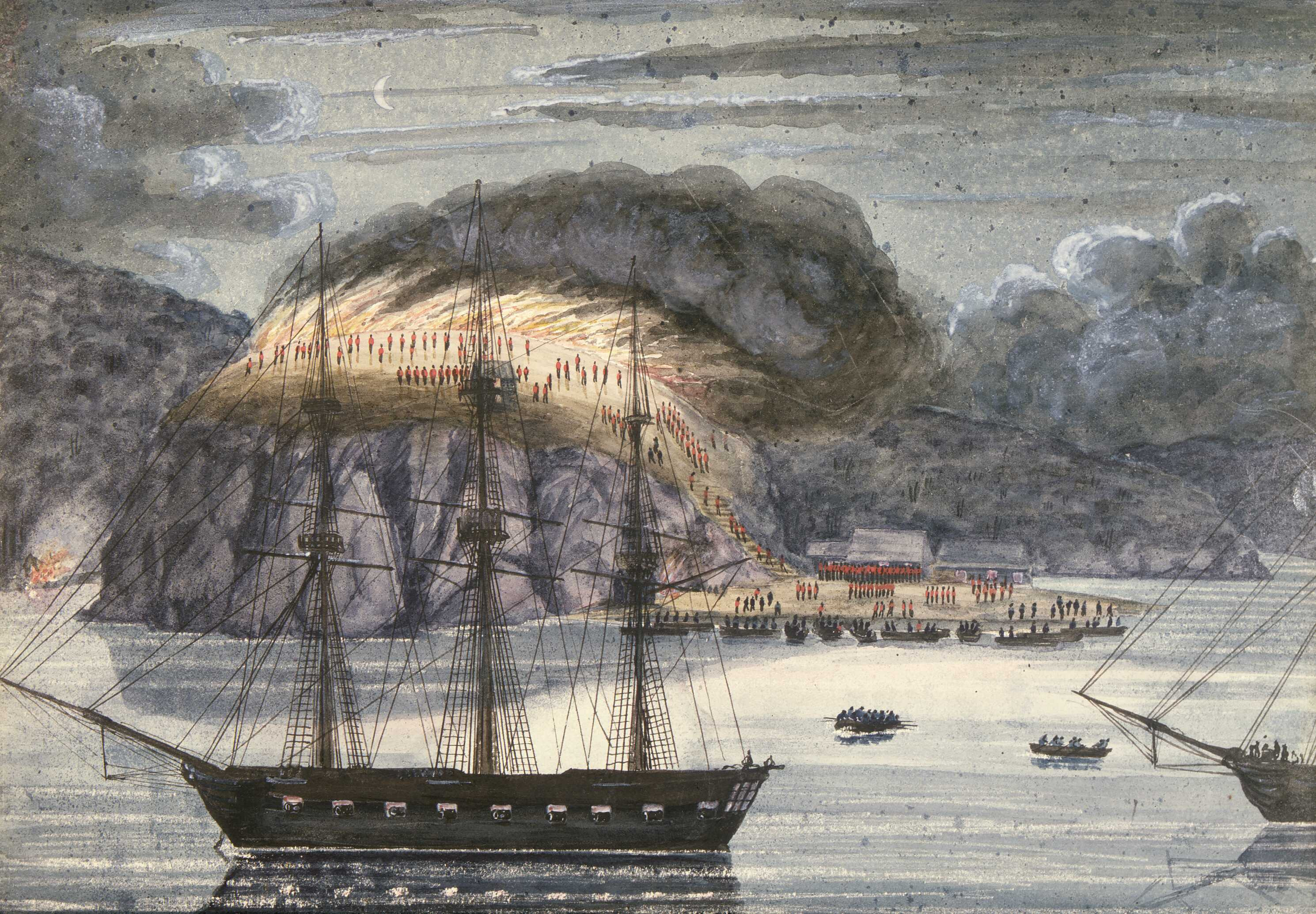
HMS North Star, 6th rate frigate

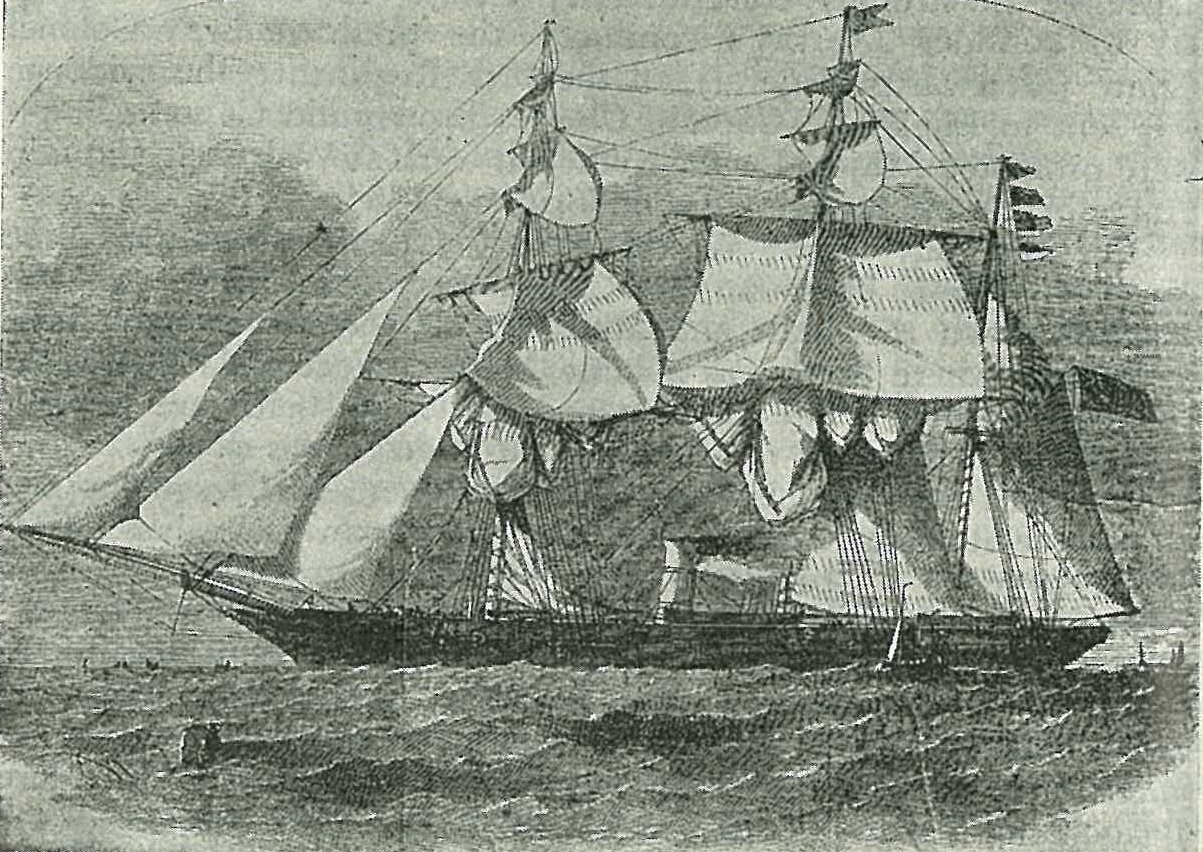
The steam sloop HMCSS Victoria

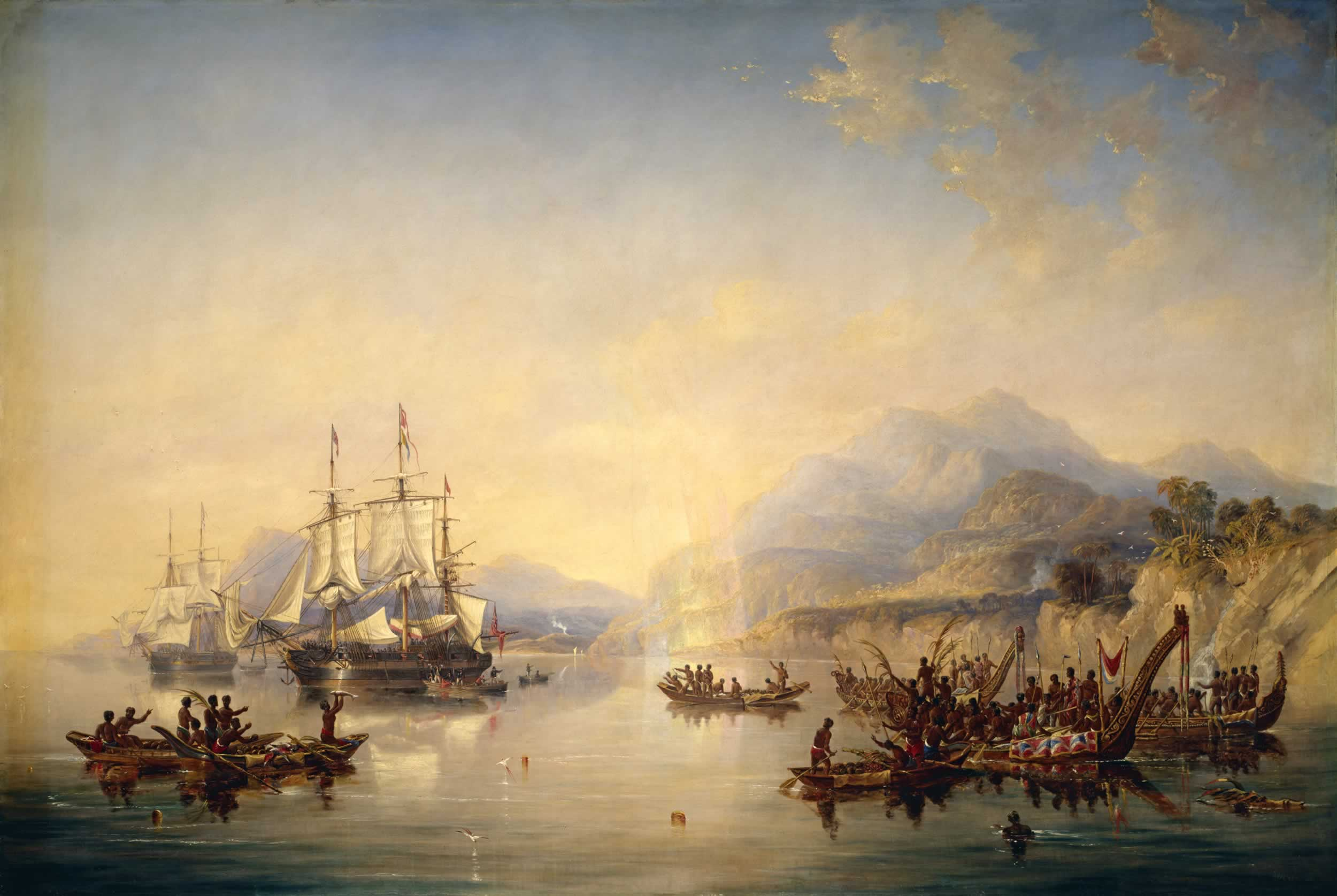
HMS Erebus and Terror of the Ross expedition visit New Zealand in August 1841 on their way to the Antarctic

In the early years of European settlement, New Zealand's naval defence consisted of occasional visits by ships of the Royal Navy based on New South Wales. There was no base in New Zealand.

In the quarter century from 1845, some twenty Royal Navy ships took part in actions between Māori and Pākehā, with the colonial government taking up some commercial ships in supporting roles. Another contribution came on loan from Australia, in the form of the Victorian naval screw steam sloop Victoria, in the first Taranaki conflict of 1860–61. They and the HEICS Elphinstone, East Indiaman, provided gun and crew, to form militia units for fighting ashore. The ships served mainly as communication, transport and supply links between places of conflict but, more importantly perhaps, also served as real symbols of British authority in areas where conflict was close to breaking out, or already had.

Royal Navy ships involved in the first New Zealand Wars
Name	Type	Armament	Built	Notes
Calliope	6th rate frigate	28 guns	1837	
Castor	5th rate frigate	36 guns	1832	
Daphne	Daphne-class corvette	18 guns	1838	Arrived Auckland from Valparaíso, 12 August 1845. Transported Colonel Henry Despard and troops to the Bay of Islands.
Driver	Driver-class sloop	6 guns	1840	Hutt Valley; First steam powered ship in New Zealand waters
Hazard	Favorite-class sloop	18 guns	1837	
Inflexible	Bulldog-class sloop	6 guns	1845	Wanganui
North Star	6th rate frigate	28 guns	1824	
Osprey	Brig	12 guns	1844	Arrived Bay of Islands and Auckland from Anyer, September 1845, with freight (mail, specie) for New Zealand from HMS Dædalus Wrecked at Herekino (False Hokianga), north of Hokianga, 11 April 1846.
Racehorse	sloop	18 guns	1830	

Royal Navy ships involved in the second New Zealand Wars
Name	Type	Armament	Built	Notes
Cordelia	screw sloop	30 guns	1856	
Curacoa	screw frigate	31 guns	1854	
Eclipse	screw sloop	4 guns	1860	
Esk	screw corvette	21 guns	1860	Sold 1903
Falcon	screw sloop	17 guns	1854	Sold 1920
Fawn	screw sloop	17 guns	1856	Sold 1884
Harrier	screw sloop	17 guns	1854	
Miranda	screw corvette	14 guns	1851	
Niger	screw sloop	14 guns	1846	
Orpheus	screw corvette	22 guns	1861	Wrecked 1863 on the Manukau Harbour sandbars
Pelorus	screw corvette	20 guns	1857	
Victoria	steam sloop	8 guns	1855	

Since roads were few and poorly formed, the sea, with all its hazards was often the only practical means of communication. Royal Navy ships and their well-trained and disciplined crews were the mainstays of battles and skirmishes.

=== First gunboat ===
In 1846 the Colonial Records of Revenue and Expenditure listed the purchase of a gunboat for Porirua Harbour for 100 pounds 17 shillings and 6 pence. This modest acquisition was the first boat purchased by a governing authority in New Zealand for use as a vessel of war.

The boat was a longboat which had been recovered from the wreck of the barque Tyne, near Sinclair Head, Wellington on 4 July 1845. No name for the boat is mentioned in any sources. Carpenters from HMS Calliope converted her into a gunboat. She was lengthened, fitted with a 12 pdr carronade at the bow, and equipped also with a small brass gun as protection against musket shot.

The Calliope took the boat to Porirua in July 1846. The gunboat was used for some time at Porirua on patrol duty, manned mainly by crew from the Calliope. In December it was transferred to Wanganui, again aboard Calliope. At Wanganui a young midshipman severely wounded a minor Putiki chief with an accidental pistol shot. Māori wanted the surrender of the young officer, which declined, led a small party of Māori to take on utu by the Gilfillan murders. The gunboat saw more action in Wanganui until, damaged by its own gun recoil, it was disarmed in late 1847.

=== Assistance from Australia ===
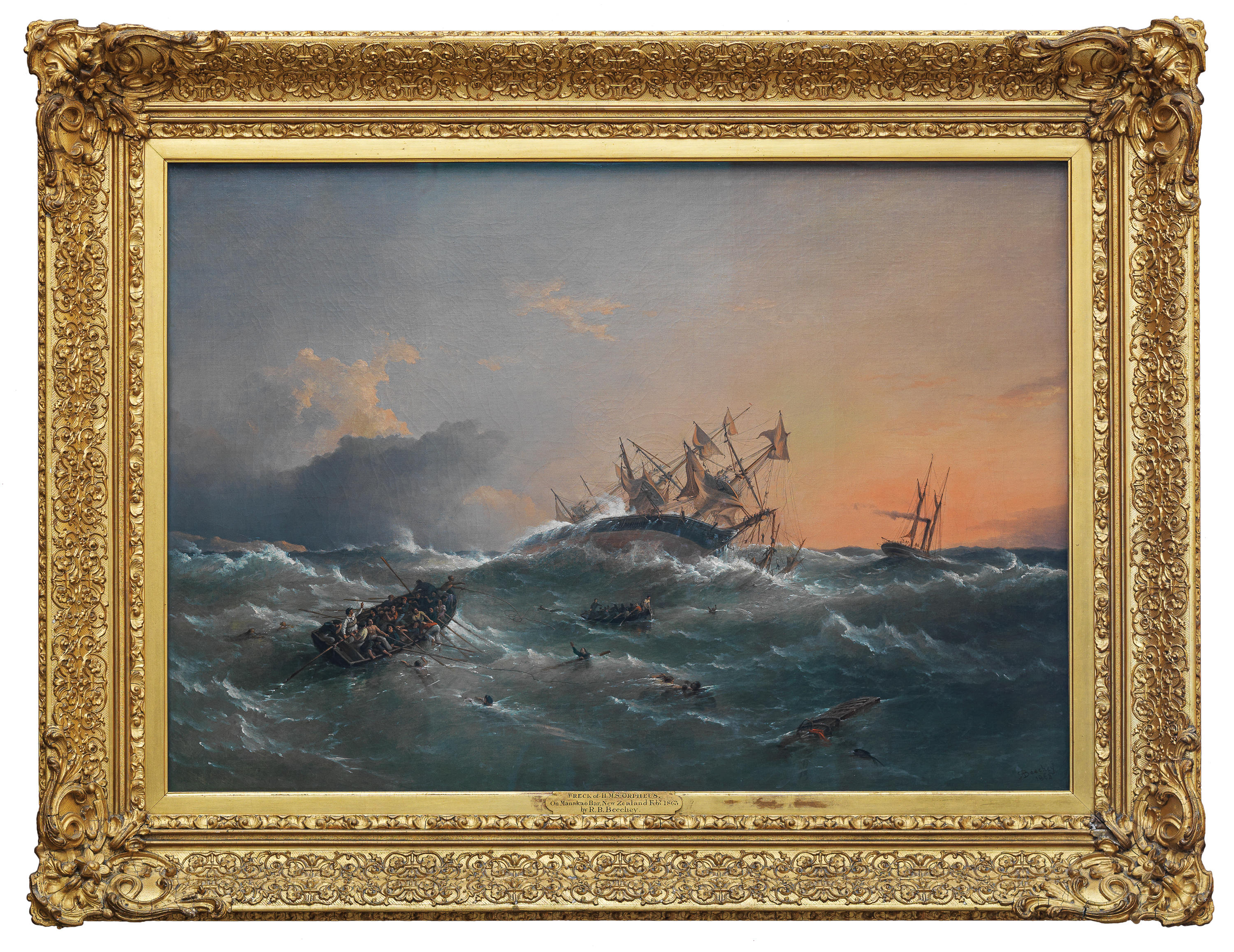
Richard Beechey's 1863 painting of the wrecking of HMS Orpheus.

In March 1860 the First Taranaki War started, and the colonial government requested help from Royal Navy and other ships based in Australia. In June 1860, HMS Pelorus, the flagship of the Australian Squadron of the Royal Navy, participated in the attack on Puketakauere pā during the First Taranaki War. Later that year, the crew landed at Kairau to support British troops under attack from Māori and in January 1861 a gun crew from the ship helped defend the British redoubt at Huirangi against the Māori.

In 1862, HMS Orpheus replaced Pelorus as flagship of the Australian Squadron. In February 1863, while delivering naval supplies and troop reinforcements to Auckland, Orpheus was wrecked on the sandbars at the entrance to Manukau Harbour. Of the ship's complement of 259, 189 died in the disaster. It was New Zealand's worst maritime tragedy.

In 1856, the Australian Colony of Victoria had received its own naval vessel, HMCSS Victoria. In 1860 Victoria deployed also to assist the New Zealand colonial government. When Victoria returned to Australia the vessel had suffered one fatality and taken part in several minor actions.

=== Waikato Flotilla ===
The following tables cover the ships (seagoing and river gunboats) which were purchased, requisitioned or purpose built for the New Zealand Colonial Government, for duties connected with the New Zealand Wars in the Waikato, Bay of Plenty and Taranaki, during the decade from 1860.

In addition, the Royal Navy operated HMS Curacoa, Esk, Fawn and Miranda out of Auckland, plus Eclipse and Harrier on the Manukau. This maintained a Royal Navy presence in these regions during the 1863–64 Waikato conflict, both as warships and in providing personnel for the fighting on land (the Naval Brigade) and for operating the Waikato flotilla.

Though there was no official New Zealand navy the ships were run as a naval force and transport service, and in that sense constitute the first New Zealand navy. However the flotilla was largely manned by Royal Navy personnel.

==== River boats ====
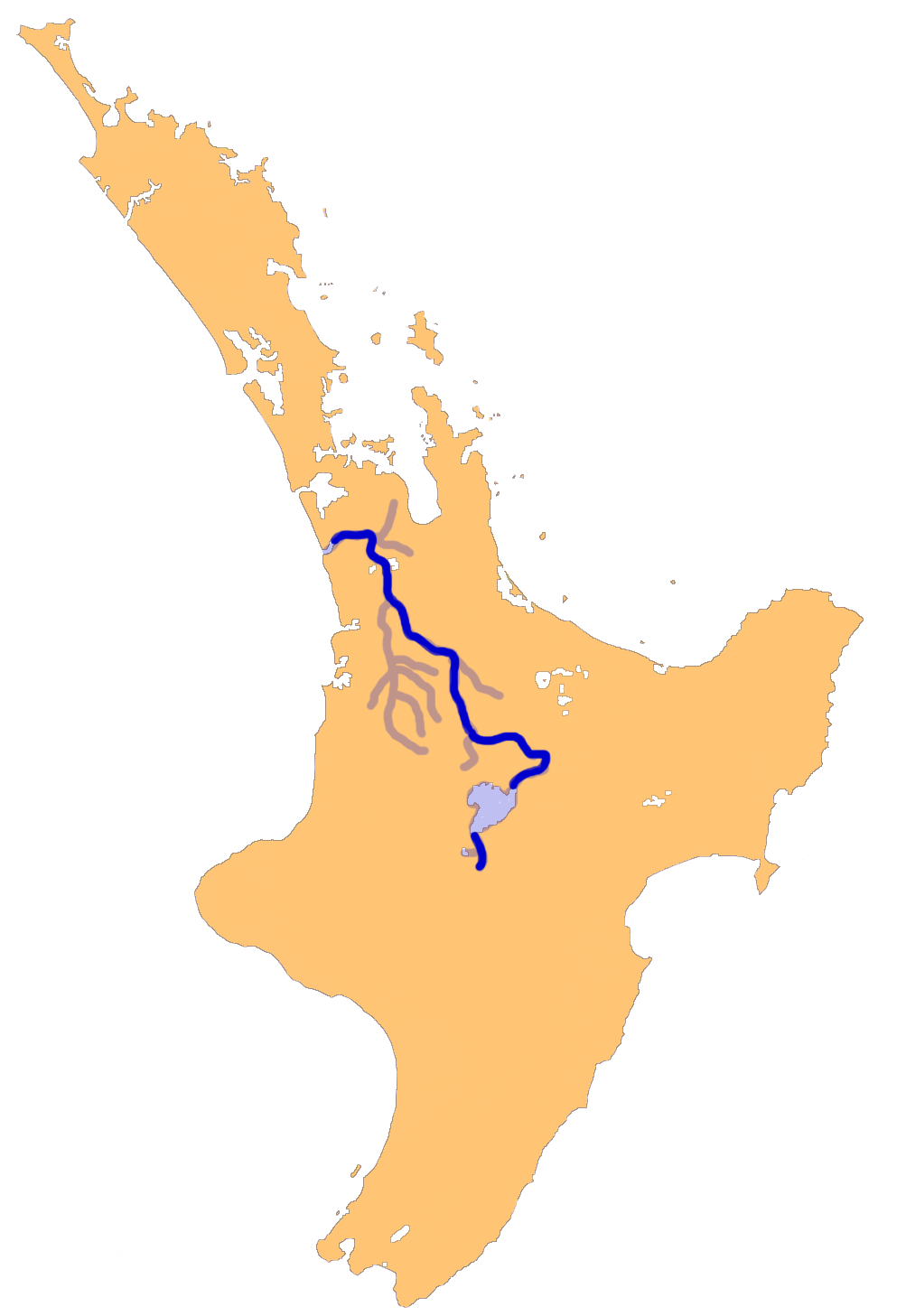
The Waikato River system It is to be hoped that the Calliope's gunboat, the schooner Caroline, the paddle-steamers Avon and Sandfly, and the river-steamers Pioneer, Koheroa, and Rangiriri, and the men of the British Navy who manned them, will not be forgotten in our histories — Sydney Waters

External images
- The river gunboat Pioneer
- Pioneer at Meremere

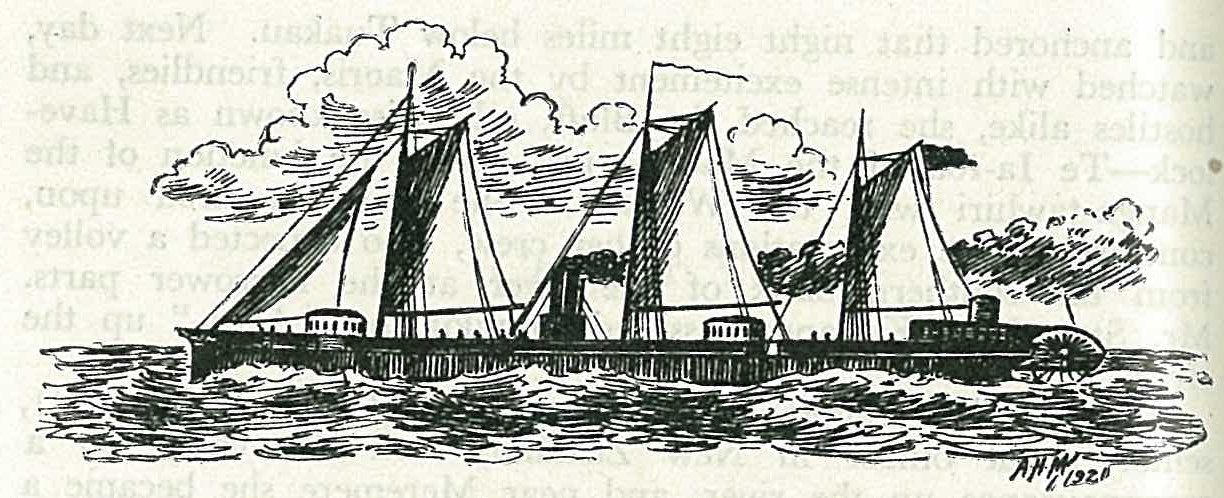
The 300 ton, stern wheel gunboat Pioneer, 1863–1866, was New Zealand's first purpose-built warship

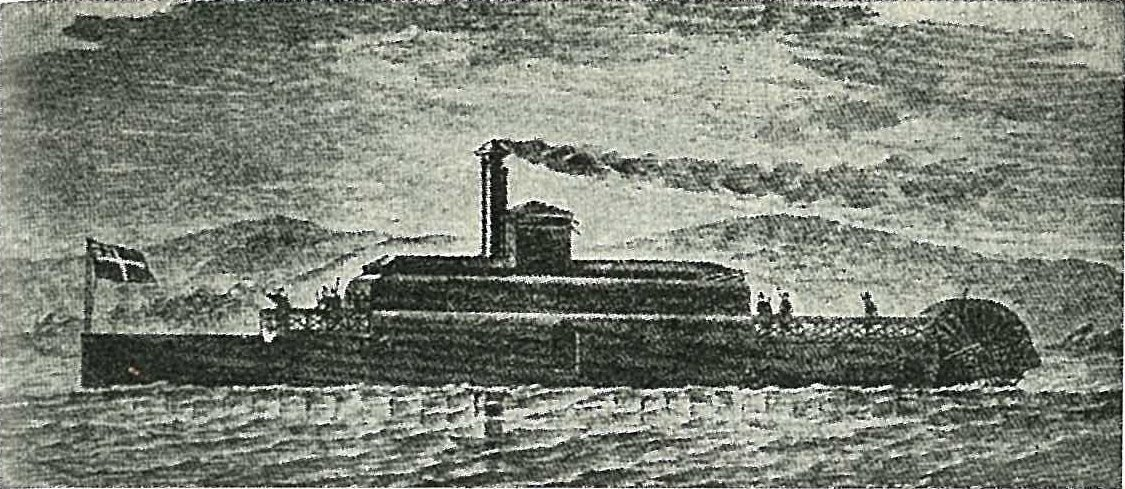
The river gunboat Rangiriri, 1864–70

The Waikato River rises in the eastern slopes of Mount Ruapehu and flows through the Tongariro River system and Lake Taupō, New Zealand's largest lake, before running 400 kilometres though the Waikato Plains until it empties into the sea at Port Waikato. The river and its tributary Waipā River, joining at Ngāruawāhia, took the British forces right into the heart of the war. Some of the river ships went up as far as (now) Cambridge on the Waikato and almost to Pirongia on the Waipa (using present place names).

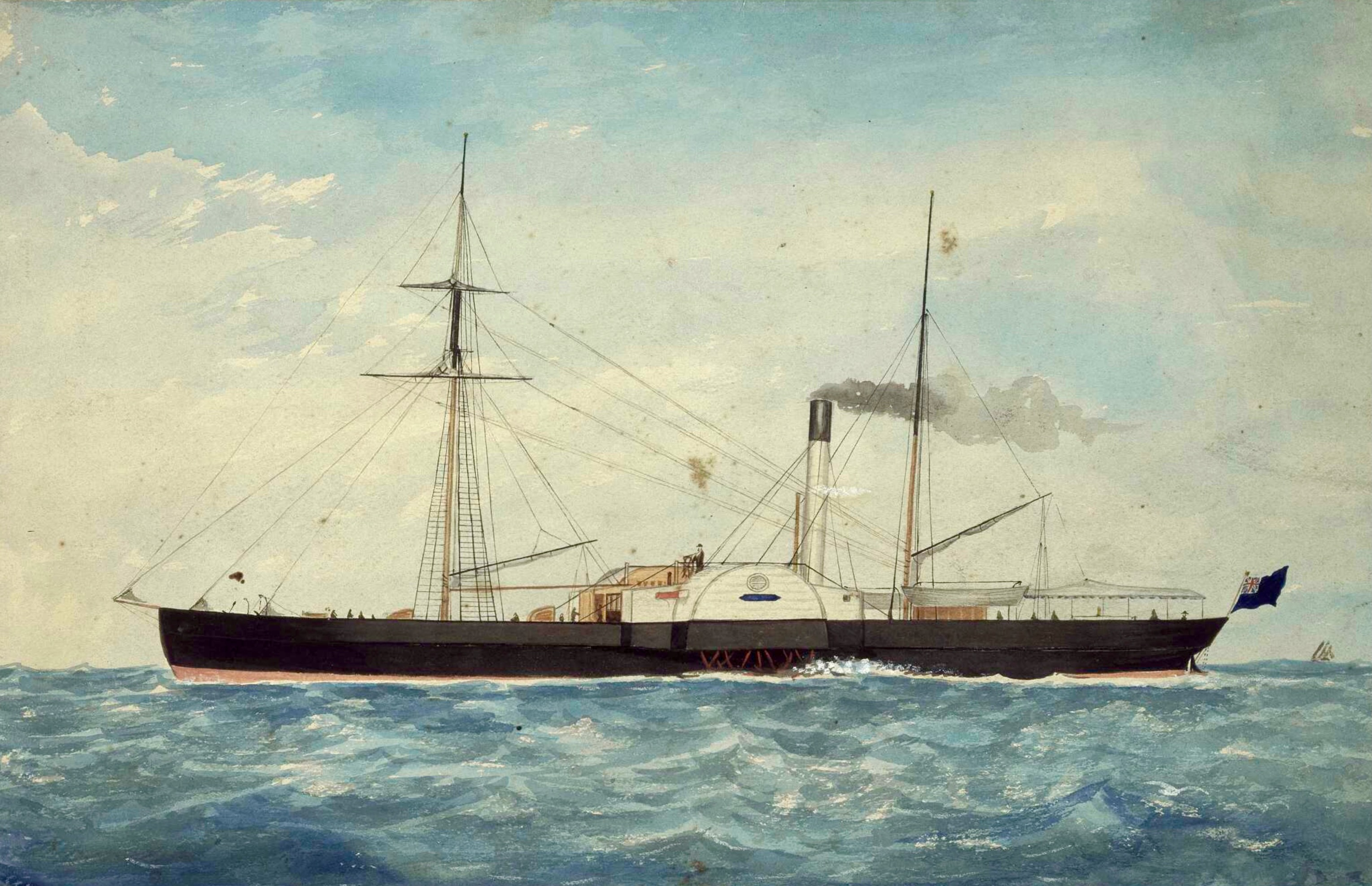
PS Sturt in 1867

Eight ships were built, of which only the Avon and the Pioneer saw extensive action.

Name	Type	Armament	Service	Grt	Dimensions	Built / Fate
Avon	paddle steamer	1 × 12-pdr 1 rocket tube	1862–68	43	17.7 × 4.7 m 58.2 × 15.4 ft	Built 1860 at Lyttelton of iron Wrecked 1886 in Blind Bay
Gundagai	Supply and troop ship.		1864–66	139	36.6 × 4.9 m 120 × 16 ft	Built 1855 at Goolwa of iron Wrecked 1886 Pātea bar
Koheroa	stern wheel gunboat	2 × 12-pdr in embrasures 1 rocket tube	1864–67		27.6 × 6.1 m 90.6 × 20 ft	Built 1864 at Sydney of iron and reassembled at Port Waikato; Wrecked 1868 off Cape Palliser
Moutoa			1865–68	79	30.6 × 4.3 m 100 × 14.2 ft	Built 1865 at Port Waikato of wood Reported in 1897 as having been re-engineered.
Pioneer	stern wheel gunboat	2 × 12-pdr in cupolas 1 rocket tube	1863–66	300	46.6 × 6.1 m 153 × 20 ft	Built 1863 at Sydney of iron Wrecked 1866 on the Manukau Harbour bar
Prince Alfred			1864–65	163	36 × 6.6 m 118 × 21.6 ft	Built 1861 at Adelaide of wood Burnt out (arson) late 1880s, beached at Rocky Point, Port Chalmers
Rangiriri	stern wheel gunboat	2 × 12-pdr in embrasures 1 rocket tube	1864–70		27.6 × 6.1 m 90.6 × 20 ft	Built 1864 at Sydney of iron and reassembled at Port Waikato; Abandoned c1890 in Waikato River. Raised 1982 and incorporated as historic monument in riverbank park at Parana Park in 2009.
Sturt			1864–70	157	41.8 × 7 m 137 × 23 ft	Built 1856 in Adelaide of iron Originally shipped to India in 1851. Bought by Nelson & Marlborough Steam Navigation Co in 1863. Able to steam at 10.5 mph (16.9 km/h). 137 ft (42 m) x 23 ft (7.0 m) A lead cannonball fired by Sturt is in Mōkau Museum. Wrecked on 21 September 1870 Waimakariri River bar, when she hit the bottom and the engine was damaged, leaving her to drift onto the beach.

==== Coastal boats ====
Most of the seagoing ships served first on the Waikato ( e.g. Gundagai, Lady Barkly, Sturt) and were later used for troop and stores transport between coastal ports. A substantial naval dockyard with workshops was set up at Putataka (now Port Waikato) where the gunboats and barges were built and repaired. The dockyard and other depots were closed down and the flotilla dispersed after the New Zealand Wars ended in 1867.

Name	Type	Armament	Service	Grt	Dimensions	Built / Fate
Alexandra	Screw steamer		1863–65	349	49.4 × 7.4m 162 × 24.3 ft	Built 1863 in Renfrew of iron Sank 1865 off Pukearuhe
Caroline	schooner	1 × 32-pdr	1860–63	25	17.1 × 4.4 m 56.2 × 14.5 ft	Built 1860 in Omaha of wood Wrecked 1879 Marlborough Sounds
Lady Barkly	Screw steamer		1863–67	49	28 × 3.7 m 91.9 × 12 ft	Built 1861 in Melbourne of wood Broken up 1934.
Midnight	schooner	1 × 4-pdr	1863–70	26	13.9 × 4.2 m 45.7 × 13.7 ft	Built 1863 in Auckland of wood
Sandfly	paddle steamer	2 × 12-pdr	1863–65	82	32.2 × 4.8 m 108.9 × 15.7 ft	Built 1856 in York of iron. Wrecked 1868 near New Plymouth

== Fears of Russian invasion ==
A long-standing fear of invasion by the Imperial Russian Navy, symbolised by the hoax Russian warship Kaskowiski raid on Auckland, 1875, led to the arming of New Zealand ports with heavy guns in the decade from about 1880. A further hoax Russian warship attack, this time in Wellington in 1885, was spurred by fears over French, German and Russian policies in the South Pacific, late in 1883.

=== Mine-laying steamers ===
As a contribution to port defences the government ordered a small "submining" steamer from Scotland. It was shipped to Wellington for assembly in sections, fitted with a locally made engine, named Ellen Ballance, and went into service about 1884. She was put under the responsibility of army engineers, who gained Engineer Corp status in May 1887.

Submarine mining was the laying of defensive mines on the seabed about port entrances. In 1898 the New Zealand forces commander advised the government that Ellen Ballance was dangerous for laying out mines in anything approaching bad weather. He recommended that two "proper" submarine minelaying steamers should be acquired, one for Auckland and one for Wellington. This was approved, and in October 1900 the construction of two enlarged Napier of Magdala type vessels were ordered. These were named Janie Seddon and Lady Roberts.

Ellen Ballance went to Lyttelton soon after being replaced by Janie Seddon, and then to Otago Harbour in October 1905 as transport to RNZ Artillery gun emplacements such as Ripapa Island and Taiaroa Head.

Name	Service	Grt	Propulsion	Length	Width	Builder	Notes
Ellen Ballance	1884–1907		One shaft, steam reciprocating compound engine	21.3 m 70 ft	4.3 m 14 ft	William Dennt & Bros, Dumbarton	
Janie Seddon	1902–39	126	Two shaft, steam reciprocating compound engine, 320 ihp (240 kW), 7 knots (13 km/h)	27.4 m 90 ft	5.5 m 18 ft	Fleming & Ferguson Ltd, Paisley	
Lady Roberts	1902–23	126	Two shaft, steam reciprocating compound engine, 320 ihp (240 kW), 7 knots (13 km/h)	27.4 m 90 ft	5.5 m 18 ft	Fleming & Ferguson Ltd, Paisley	

=== Spar torpedo boats ===
A further consequence of the Russian scares was that four standard design second-class spar torpedo boats were ordered, one for each of the main ports. These were built in 1883 by John Thornycroft & Co, London. They displaced 12 tons and measured 18.2 × 2.3 × 1 m (63 × 7.5 × 3.2 feet). They were powered from a single shaft with a steam locomotive engine generating 173 hp (130 kW), which give a speed of 17 knots (31 km/h). Their main weapon was an 11 m (36 ft) spar, projecting well forward over the bow, armed at its tip with an explosive device. A Nordenfelt gun was also fitted.

Boat	Name	Port	Service
No. 168	Defender (pictured)	Lyttelton	1884–1902
No. 169	Taiaroa	Port Chalmers	1884–1902
No. 170	Waitemata	Auckland	1885–1902
No. 171	Poneke	Wellington	1885–1902

The idea was that the boat would proceed at high speed towards the side of an enemy warship, where it would detonate the explosive at the end of its spar. The spar boats were constructed for speed, so they were narrow and shallow, and were armoured with plating only 1.6 mm thick. They could not operate in anything like rough water, and using them as attack vessels may well have been as hazardous for the crew as the target. They were obsolete before they were completed, and only the last two had the up-to-date Whitehead "fish" torpedo fitted when built.

In 1884 torpedo boat units were formed to operate them. They were organised in a similar way to the artillery "Navals" with appropriate naval uniforms. They were at first called the Torpedo Branch of the Armed Constabulary. Then in June 1887 they were gazetted as a permanent militia and given the formal, but more manageable title, Torpedo Corps. The torpedo boats had galvanized plating, which meant they could not stay in the water and had to be kept on slipways. Each Torpedo Corps had its own quarters and boatshed. Their main role soon became training, and by 1900 they were well out of date.

== Late 1880s – early 1900s ==
=== Calliope Dock ===
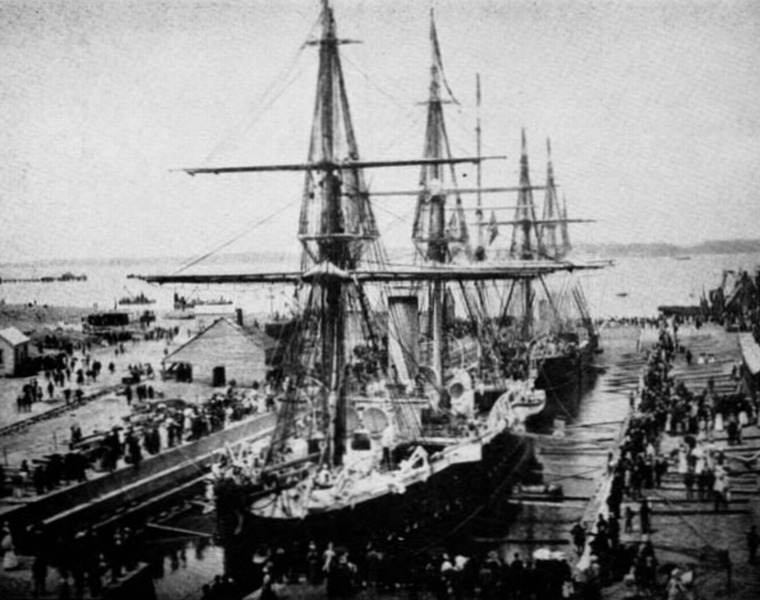
HMS Calliope and HMS Diamond in the dock during opening ceremonies 1888

An event that was to have an important bearing on New Zealand naval policy in later years was the official opening on 16 February 1888 of the Calliope graving dock. This was constructed over three years by the Auckland Harbour Board at Calliope Point on the Devonport shore.

Designed to take vessels up to 500 feet (150 m), the dock was the largest in the southern hemisphere. In 1892 the Admiralty acquired from the Harbour Board 4 acres (16,000 m^{2}) of reclaimed land adjacent to the dock so they could develop naval workshops.

=== Subsidies to the Royal Navy ===
For years the Royal Navy operated an imperial squadron in Australia called the "Australian Squadron". The 1887 Imperial Conference in London lead to a naval agreement that the Australian Squadron would be supplemented by another squadron, a joint Australian and New Zealand naval force of five cruisers and two torpedo gunboats. These ships would be based in Sydney and called the "Australasian Auxiliary Squadron". Two ships, one from the Imperial squadron and one from the new squadron, would be stationed in New Zealand waters. An annual subsidy of £120,000 was to be paid to London by Australia and New Zealand, of which New Zealand's share was £20,000.

This policy of subsidising Imperial navy forces allowed the Admiralty to retain central control over the navies, yet for New Zealand it guaranteed a cruiser presence in their waters. It also allowed New Zealanders direct entry into the Royal Navy. This arrangement suited both parties and remained in force for the next twenty years. The 1902 Imperial Conference modified the Naval Agreement and New Zealand's annual subsidy increased to £40,000. The subsidy was further increased in 1908 to £100,000.

=== A training ship ===
In 1907 the Marine Department acquired an 805-ton gun boat and converted her to New Zealand's first training ship NZS Amokura. Over the next 14 years, 527 boys trained in her, 25 of them going on to naval service and most of the others into the merchant marine.

The boat was originally a three masted auxiliary barquentine, square rigged on the foremast, fore-and-aft on the after masts. Her hull was composite; carvel teak planking on steel frames.

=== Gift of battlecruiser ===
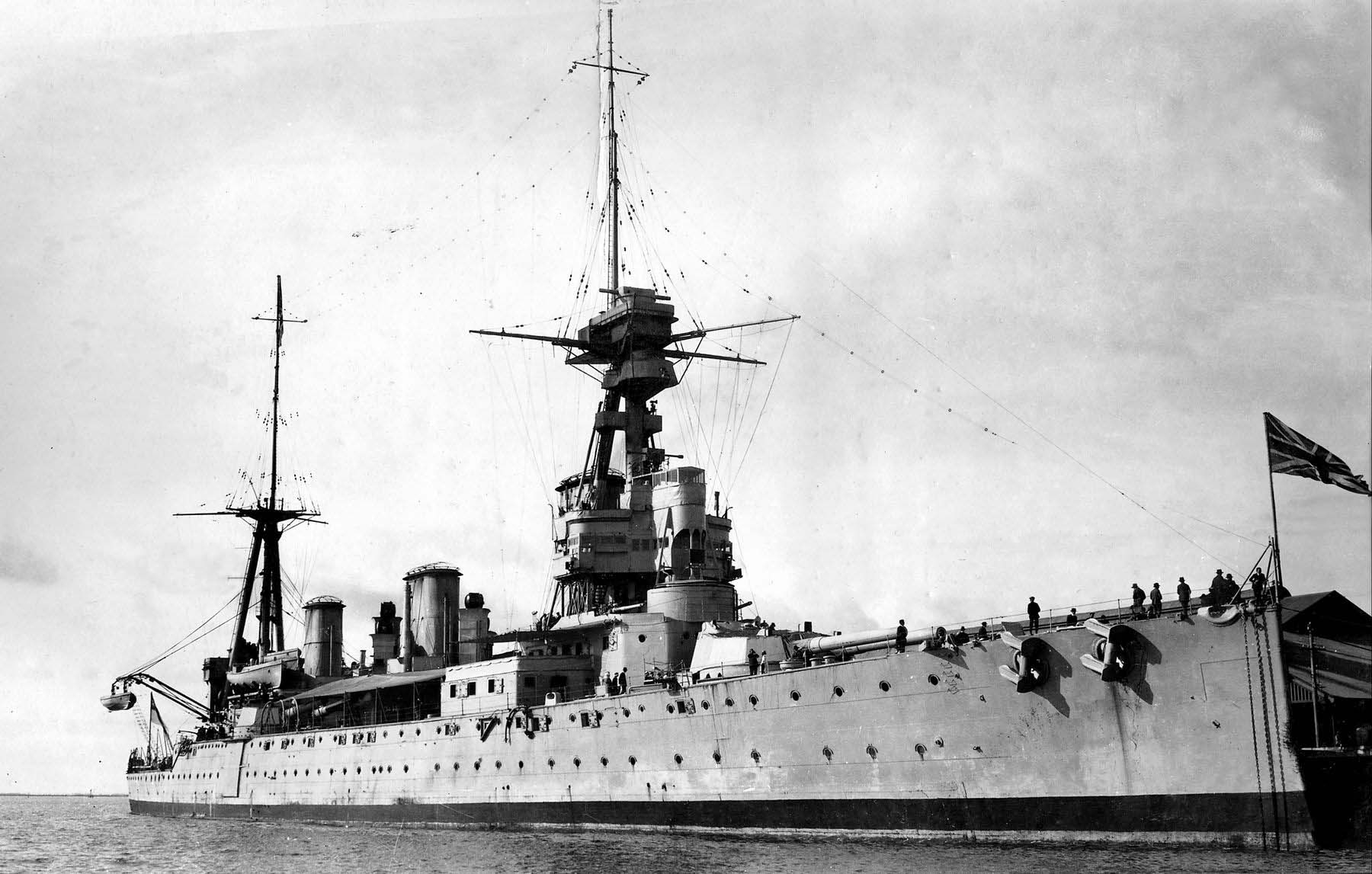
HMS New Zealand at Port Adelaide, May 1919

In 1909, Great Britain was in the middle of a naval and political crisis; Germany had expanded her naval programme and was speeding up the building of ships of all classes. On 22 March 1909 the Prime Minister of New Zealand, Sir Joseph Ward, made an offer to fund "one first-class battleship, and if need be, two" as a gift to the Royal Navy. This offer was accepted by the British Government and the battlecruiser HMS New Zealand was built by Fairfield for £1,783,190.

The New Zealand was commissioned on 23 November 1912 with three New Zealand officers. After being inspected by the King, she sailed on a ten-month world cruise, arriving in Wellington in April 1913. For ten weeks she called at every port and was inspected by an estimated half a million people, nearly half the population of the country.

She was 590 feet (180 m) long, weighed 19,000 tons, and had four propellers connected to turbine engines of 44,000 hp (33,000 kW) which drove her at 26 knots (48 km/h). New Zealand took part in all three major naval actions in the North Sea: at Heligoland Bight, Dogger Bank and Jutland. She also contributed to the sinking of two cruisers.

Throughout these battles the captain wore a Māori piupiu (a warrior's skirt of rolled flax) and a greenstone hei-tiki, given to the ship by an old chieftain in 1913 with the injunction that they were always to be worn by the captain of the New Zealand when she was fighting. The seamen showed much faith in these Māori mascots. According to lower deck legend, the gift included the prophecy that the ship would one day be in action and be hit in three places, but her casualties would not be heavy (this turned out to be true).

The New Zealand was scrapped in 1923. Her 4-inch (100 mm) guns came to New Zealand and were used at Fort Dorset and Godley Head. The piupiu also came back to New Zealand and is now in the possession of the Royal New Zealand Naval Museum.

== Timeline ==
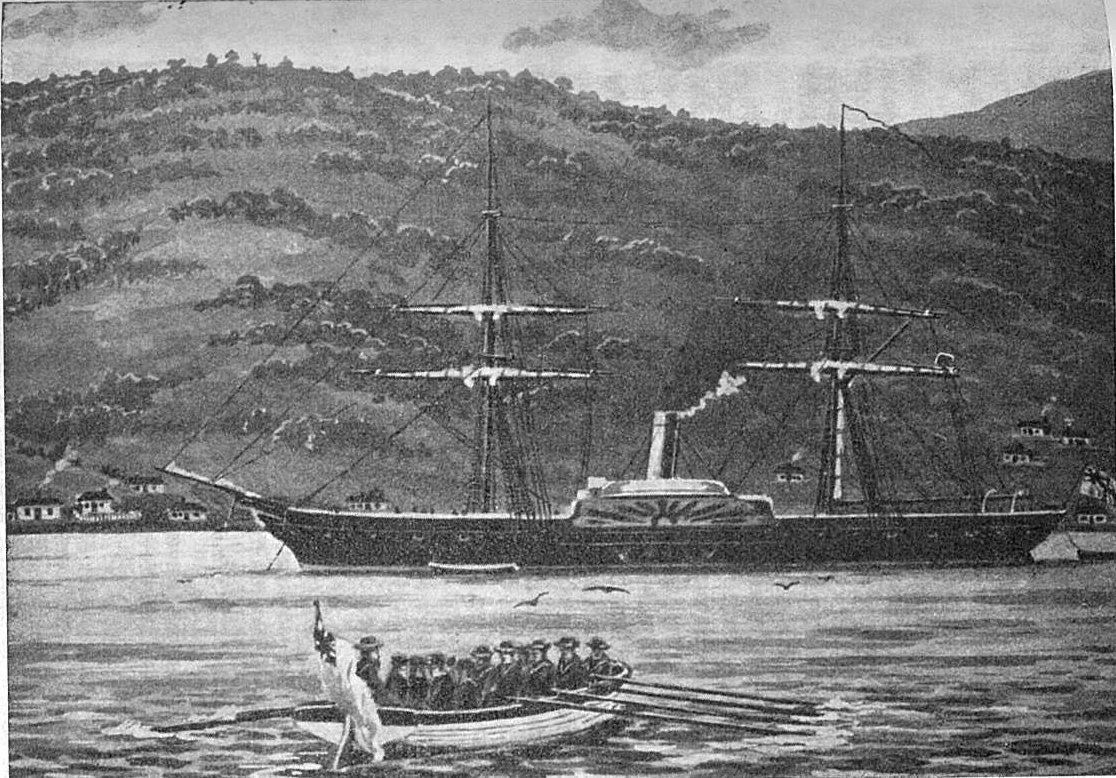
HMS Driver, first steam warship to visit New Zealand, 1846

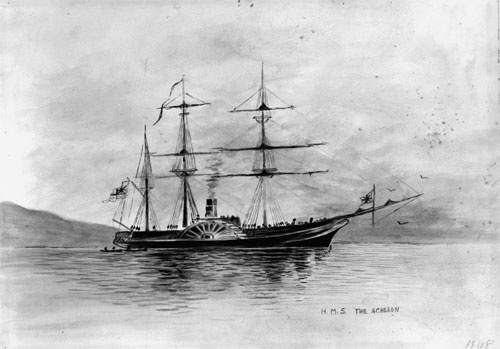
HMS Acheron, a steam paddle sloop, began the "Great Survey" of the New Zealand coast in 1848

- c. 1300: War canoes or waka taua of the Māori
- 1642: Abel Tasman visits in his ships Heemskerck and Zeehaen
- 1769: James Cook visits in his barque HM Bark Endeavour
- 1788: The colony of New South Wales is founded with a technical responsibility for New Zealand. In practice they had little interest and the responsibility was withdrawn in 1841
- 1790s: British, French and American whaling, sealing and trading ships start arriving in numbers.
- 1840: The Treaty of Waitangi is signed bringing New Zealand into the British Empire and giving Māori equal rights with British citizens.
- 1840: Auckland becomes the capital
- 1840: Captain Owen Stanley on HMS Britomart draws up an Admiralty Chart of the Waitematā Harbour
- 1840s: The rate of European settlement, primarily from the United Kingdom, becomes considerable.
- 1841: New Zealand is proclaimed a colony, independent of New South Wales, and divided into provinces.
- 1846: First steam warship to visit New Zealand, HMS Driver, 20 Jan 1846
- 1846: First gunboat purchased by a governing authority in New Zealand
- 1848: HMS Acheron, a steam paddle sloop, begins the "Great Survey" of the New Zealand coast
- 1852: The New Zealand Constitution Act is passed establishing a colonial government.
- 1856: First detailed hydrographic survey of New Zealand ports and the coastline completed.
- 1859: The number of white settlers (Pākehā) exceeds the number of Māori.
- 1860: Naval help is sought from Australia as land wars escalate.
- 1862–1870: To assist in the land wars a temporary navy is established. This is the Waikato flotilla, New Zealand's first de facto navy, comprising eight river boats, four armoured barges, five coastal boats and a naval dockyard.
- 1863: The 300 ton stern wheel gunboat Pioneer, built in Sydney, is the first warship purpose-built for the New Zealand Government. She is followed by two sister ships, Koheroa and Rangiriri.
- 1880s: In response to Russian scares coastal defences are established in the main ports.
- 1882: The first submarine mining steamer is ordered.
- 1884: A spar torpedo boat is attached to each of the main ports.
- 1885–88: Calliope Dock, 500 feet (150 m) long, is constructed. It is the largest in the southern hemisphere.
- 1887: The Imperial Conference in London establishes the Australasian Auxiliary Squadron. New Zealand agrees to pay an annual subsidy of £20,000.
- 1904: The Imperial Conference in London increases the annual subsidy to £40,000.
- 1907: New Zealand changes from being a colony to a separate dominion within the commonwealth.
- 1907: The Marine Department acquires an 800-ton gun boat and converts her to the New Zealand's first training ship, NZS Amokura.
- 1908: The dreadnought battleship race with Germany starts and the Imperial Conference in London increases the annual subsidy to £100,000.
- 1908: Construction of a naval wharf and workshops at Calliope Point begins, funded by the Admiralty.
- 1911: New Zealand gives the battlecruiser, HMS New Zealand, to Britain.
- 1911: The number of white settlers (Pākehā) reaches one million
- 1913: New Zealand Naval Forces are created as a separate division within the Royal Navy and the history of the naval forces of New Zealand is continued in that article.

== See also ==
- History of the Royal New Zealand Navy
- Coastal fortifications of New Zealand
