= History of the Royal New Zealand Navy =

The history of the Royal New Zealand Navy leads back to early New Zealand-based gunboats used in controlling the British interests in the new colony, as well as to the strong linkages to the British Navy itself.

== Origins ==
Originally the British Royal Navy provided security for the colony of New Zealand, but in 1846, the settlers bought their first gunboat. Later, the so-named Waikato Flotilla operated from 1860 to 1865, and at the same time a Naval Artillery Volunteer corps was established to provide harbour defence. In 1884, the government purchased four new spar torpedo boats, and starting in 1887 it funded ships of the Australasian Auxiliary Squadron.

Before establishment of the navy, the people of New Zealand paid for the building of the battlecruiser HMS New Zealand, which was at the Battle of Jutland and which served the Royal Navy with distinction.

The Naval Defence Act 1913 formally established the New Zealand Naval Forces, and the old RN cruiser HMS Philomel was the first to be commissioned into it. From 1921, the forces were known as the New Zealand Division of the Royal Navy, operating two cruisers and a minesweeper.

== World War II ==
When Britain went to war against Germany in 1939, New Zealand immediately also declared war. In recognition of the fact that the naval force was now largely self-sufficient and independent of the Royal Navy, the New Zealand Division of the Royal Navy became the Royal New Zealand Navy (RNZN), the prefix "royal" being granted by King George VI (as King in right of New Zealand) on 1 October 1941. Ships thereafter were prefixed with HMNZS (His/Her Majesty's New Zealand Ship).

The light cruiser HMS Achilles participated in the first major naval battle of World War II, the Battle of the River Plate off the River Plate estuary between Argentina and Uruguay, in December 1939. Achilles and two other cruisers, HMS Ajax and HMS Exeter, were in an operation that forced the crew of the German pocket battleship Admiral Graf Spee to scuttle their ship rather than face the loss of many more German seamen's lives. This decision apparently infuriated Adolf Hitler. Achilles moved to the Pacific and was working with the US Navy when damaged by a Japanese bomb off New Georgia. Following repair, she served alongside the British Pacific Fleet until the war's end.

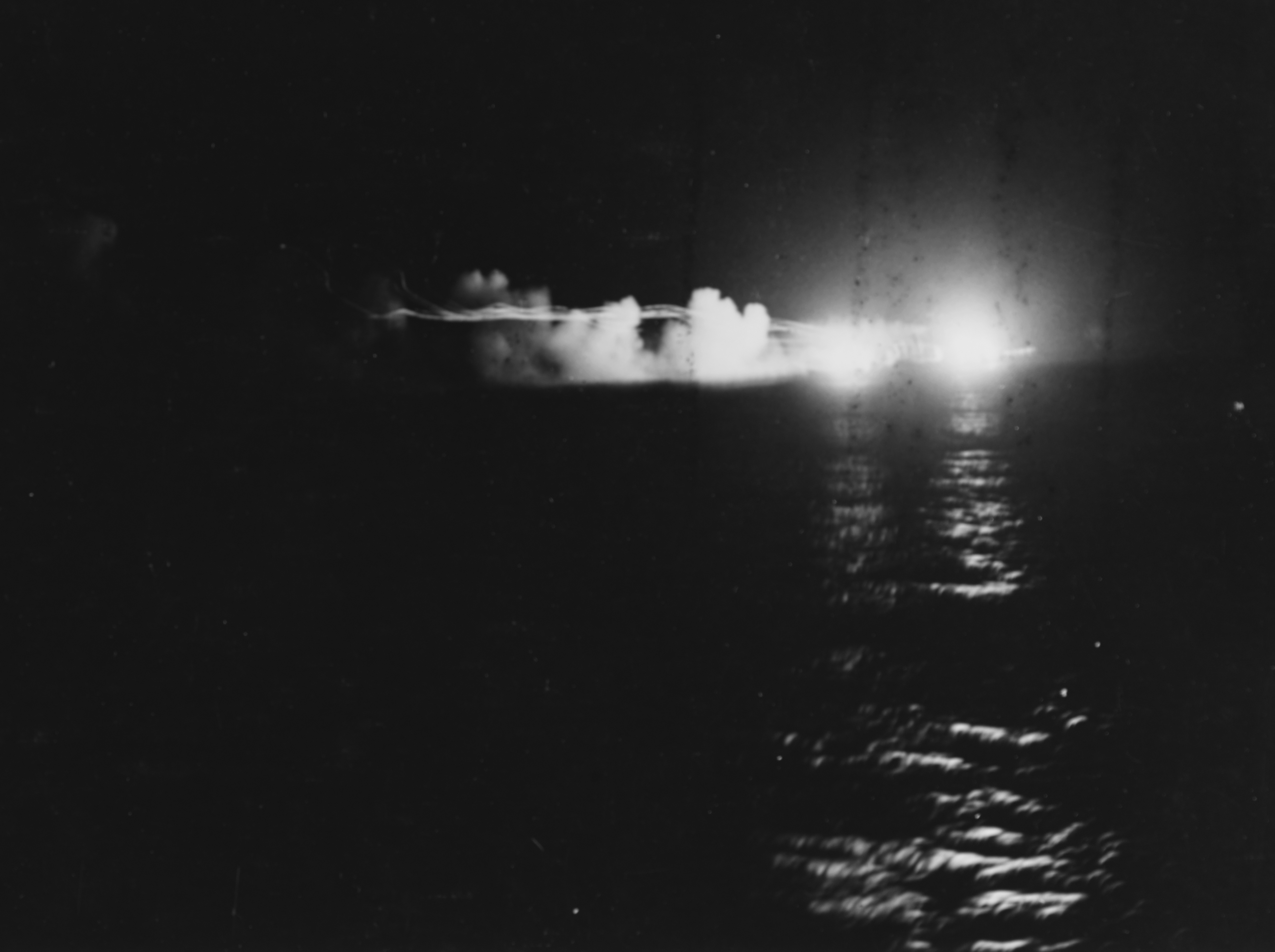
HMNZS Leander and USS St. Louis fire on Jintsu.

Achilles sister ship, HMS Leander, escorted the New Zealand Expeditionary Force to the Middle East in 1940, and was then deployed in the Mediterranean Sea, the Red Sea, and the Indian Ocean, where she was subjected to air and naval attack from Axis forces, conducted bombardments and escorted convoys, and sank the Italian auxiliary cruiser Ramb I. After serving in the Mediterranean she returned to the Pacific in 1943, assisting in the destruction of the Japanese cruiser Jintsu and being seriously damaged by torpedoes during the Battle of Kolombangara.

There was a plan in 1941 for HMS Neptune to become New Zealand's third light cruiser. To that end, it was partially crewed with New Zealanders. On 19 December, New Zealand's worst naval loss occurred when 150 of the New Zealand crew died after the ship hit mines and sank off the coast of Libya.

As the war progressed, the size of the RNZN greatly increased, and by the end of the war, there were over 60 ships in commission. These ships participated as part of the British and Commonwealth effort against the Axis in Europe, and against the Japanese in the Pacific. They also played an important role in the defence of New Zealand, from German raiders, especially when the threat of invasion from Japan appeared imminent in 1942. Many merchant boats were requisitioned and armed for help in defence. One of these was HMNZS Monowai, which saw action against a Japanese submarine off Fiji in 1942. In 1941–1942, it was decided in an agreement between the New Zealand and United States governments that the best role for the RNZN in the Pacific was as part of the United States Navy, so operational control of the RNZN was transferred to the South West Pacific Area command, and its ships joined United States 7th Fleet taskforces.

In 1943, the light cruiser HMS Gambia was transferred to the RNZN as HMNZS Gambia. In November 1944, the British Pacific Fleet (BPF), a joint British Commonwealth taskforce, was formed, based in Sydney, Australia. Most RNZN ships were transferred to the BPF, including Gambia and Achilles. They took part in the Battle of Okinawa and operations in the Sakishima Islands, near Japan. In August 1945, Gambia was New Zealand's representative at Japan's surrender.

Altogether, 561 New Zealanders died during World War II while in naval service. The end of the war saw massive cutbacks.

== Mutinies ==
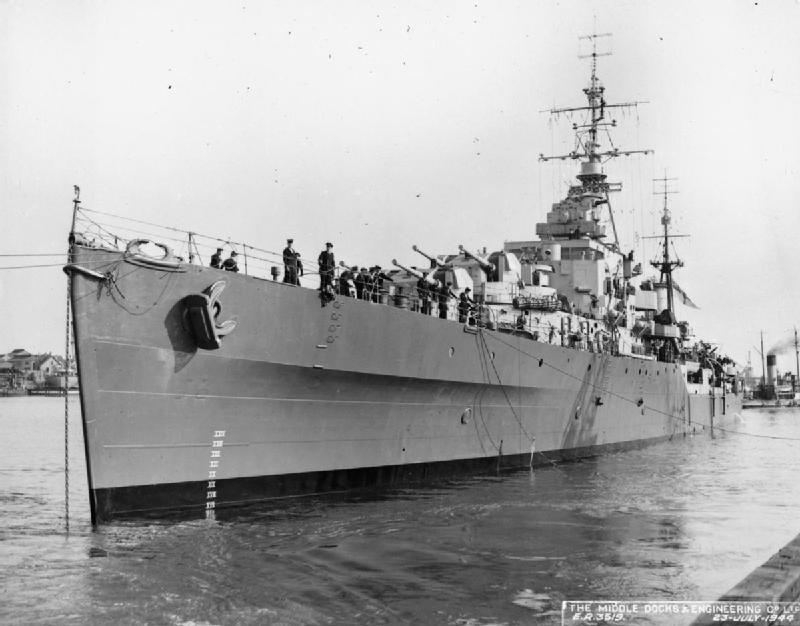
The light cruiser HMNZS Black Prince

During April 1947 a series of non-violent mutinies occurred amongst the sailors and non-commissioned officers of four RNZN ships and two shore bases. Overall, up to 20% of the sailors in the RNZN were involved in the mutinies. The resulting manpower shortage forced the RNZN to remove Black Prince, one of their most powerful warships, from service and set the navy's development and expansion back by a decade. Despite this impact, the size and scope of the events have been downplayed over time.

== Korean War ==
Six Loch-class frigates were deployed during the Korean War; HMNZ Ships Hawea, Kaniere, Pukaki, Rotoiti, Taupo, and Tutira. RNZN crews in Korea went ashore in several "Nelsonian" night raids against coastal targets and took several prisoners for intelligence gathering.

== Vietnam War ==
RNZN medical personnel were members of the 1st New Zealand Services Medical Team (NZSMT) in Vietnam, a 19-strong detachment of medical personnel from the Royal New Zealand Navy, Royal New Zealand Air Force, and Royal New Zealand Army Medical Corps deployed in April 1967. The team's role was to provide medical and surgical assistance to South Vietnamese civilians and developing local knowledge in this field. The New Zealanders relieved a United States Army medical team at Bong Son in Binh Dinh province. They also treated military casualties who were brought to the Bong Son Dispensary, including Army of the Republic of Vietnam personnel and Viet Cong prisoners. In June 1969 the team moved to the new 100-bed Bong Son Impact Hospital. The average bed-state was 92 and approximately 46,000 outpatients (mostly civilians) were treated annually before the team's withdrawal in December 1971.

Two RNZN personnel served with the second New Zealand Army Training Team Vietnam (2NZATTV), an 18-man team deployed in February 1972 based at Dong Ba Thin Base Camp, near Cam Ranh Bay. It assisted with the training of Cambodian infantry battalions. This team also provided first aid instruction and specialist medical instruction at Dong Ba Thin's 50-bed hospital.

== Political fallout with the United States ==
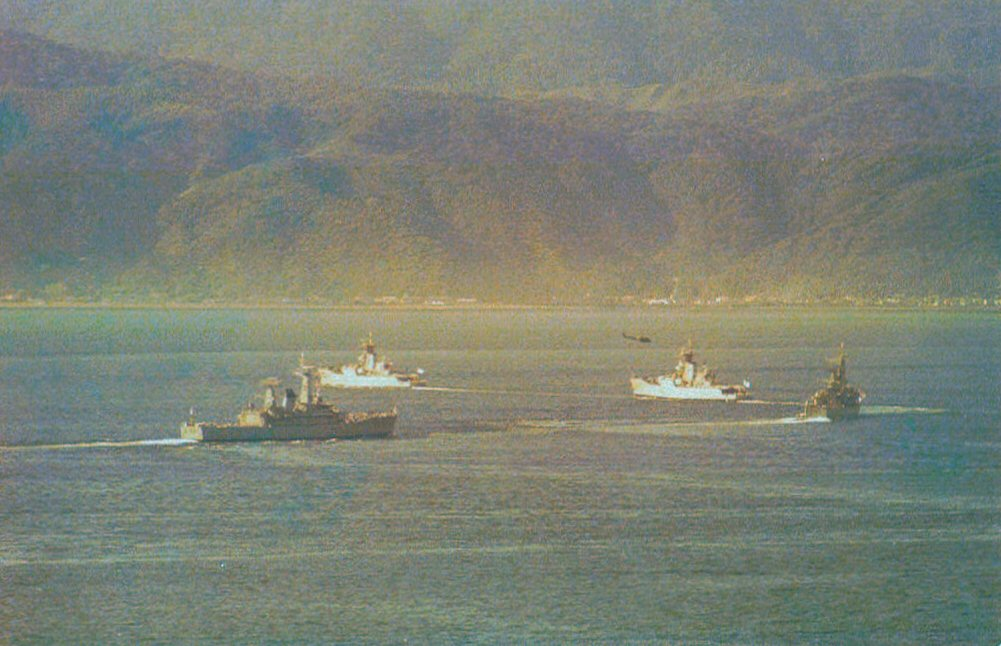
Four RNZN frigates in Wellington Harbour during 1980

Throughout the 1960s to 1984, the Royal New Zealand Navy operated with SEATO, before its dissolution, and ANZUS treaty nations. In 1984, the relationship began to break down over the issue of nuclear-powered ship visits and nuclear weapons access to New Zealand. On several occasions, New Zealand dispatched RNZN vessels to monitor environmental damage caused by French nuclear testing in the Pacific.

== East Timor ==
The RNZN supported INTERFET landings with the deployment of frigate HMNZS Te Kaha and the tanker HMNZS Endeavour. Te Kaha was later replaced by the Leander-class frigate HMNZS Canterbury, which escorted the Australian landing ship HMAS Tobruk to Suai, with elements of the New Zealand Army's 1st Battalion, Royal New Zealand Infantry Regiment aboard. A further three battalion groups, with attached naval personnel, were deployed to East Timor with INTERFET and as part of the UN peacekeeping force.

== See also ==
- New Zealand Naval Forces (1913–1921)
- New Zealand Division of the Royal Navy (1921–1941)
- Coastal Forces of the Royal New Zealand Navy
- Minesweepers of the Royal New Zealand Navy
