= Philomel =

Philomel is another name for Philomela, a character from Greek mythology. It may refer to:

== Nature ==
- A nightingale

== Arts and Letters ==
- An abbreviated form of the name Philomela, a figure in Greek mythology often invoked as a symbol in literature.
- Philomel (musical instrument), similar to the violin
- Philomel Books, an American publishing imprint of Penguin Group
- "Philomel Cottage", a successful short story written by Agatha Christie, part of The Listerdale Mystery collection, subject of a number of adaptions
- Philomèle, a lost opera written in 1690 by French composer Marc-Antoine Charpentier
- Philomèle, an opera written in 1705 by French composer Louis de La Coste
- Philomel (Babbitt), a 1964 musical composition by American composer Milton Babbitt
- Philomel, the literary magazine of the Philomathean Society of the University of Pennsylvania

== Military ==
- Philomel-class gunvessel, a class of wooden-hulled ships built for the Royal Navy between 1859 and 1867
- HMS Philomel, the name bestowed on six Royal Navy (UK) ships, including:
  - HMS Philomel (1806), an 18-gun Cruizer-class brig-sloop launched in 1806 and sold in 1817
  - HMS Philomel (1823), a 10-gun Cherokee-class brig-sloop launched in 1823 and sold in 1833
  - HMS Philomel (1842), an 8-gun brig launched in 1842
  - HMS Philomel (1860), a Philomel-class gunvessel launched in 1860 and sold in 1865
  - HMS Philomel (1867), a wooden screw gun vessel launched in 1867 and sold in 1886
  - HMS Philomel (1890), a Pearl-class cruiser launched in 1890
- HMNZS Philomel, the main administrative naval base of the Royal New Zealand Navy.

== Miscellaneous ==
- Jessica Philomele/Philomel Hartung, character in the video game Mana Khemia: Alchemists of Al-Revis
