= Basil Brooke (Royal Navy officer, born 1895) =

Royal Navy Vice Admiral and cricketer (1895–1983)

Vice-Admiral Basil Brooke CB CBE DL JP
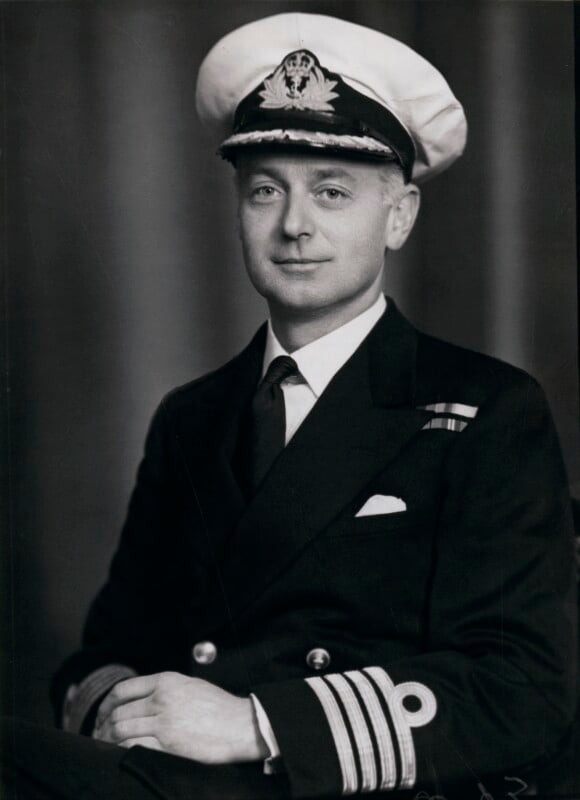
- Brooke in 1953
- Born: 6 April 1895; Boddington House, Byfield, England
- Died: 20 January 1983 (aged 87); Saffron Walden, England
- Military career
- Allegiance: United Kingdom
- Branch: Royal Navy
- Service years: 1913–1949
- Rank: Vice-Admiral
- Commands: HMS Vivid (shore base); HMS Philomel; HMS Orion; HMS Curlew; HMS Southampton; Mobile Naval Base Defence Organisation 1 HMS Renown
- Conflicts: World War I World War II
- Awards: Companion of the Order of the Bath; Commander of the Order of the British Empire
- Other work: Deputy lieutenant, Justice of the Peace, East Lothian

Basil Brooke
Domestic team information
- Years: Team
- 1919–1926: Royal Navy
- FC debut: 9 June 1919 Royal Navy v Cambridge University
- Last FC: 17 July 1926 Royal Navy v Army

Career statistics
Competition	First-class
Matches	2
Runs scored	61
Batting average	15.25
100s/50s	0/0
Top score	28
Balls bowled	90
Wickets	3
Bowling average	19.66
5 wickets in innings	0
10 wickets in match	0
Best bowling	2/48
Catches/stumpings	3/–
- Source: CricketArchive, 10 August 2008

Vice-Admiral Basil Charles Barrington Brooke CB CBE DL JP (6 April 1895 – 20 January 1983) was an English admiral and cricketer, who also played for the Singapore national cricket team. He played twice for the Royal Navy Cricket Club in first-class cricket. A member of the Brooke family which ruled the Kingdom of Sarawak from 1841 to 1946, he commanded the battle cruiser HMS Renown during the Second World War.

== Early life and family ==
Brooke was born at Boddington House, Byfield in Northamptonshire, England, the eldest son of John Charles Evelyn Hope Brooke (13 November 1858 – 19 June 1934), who was the grand-nephew of Sir James Brooke, the first White Rajah of Sarawak and who had been born there, and of The Hon. Violet Mary Barrington (9 May 1872 – 10 December 1938), who was the second daughter of the ninth Viscount Barrington. His grandfather, John Brooke Johnson-Brooke (1823–1868), the elder brother of Charles Brooke, the second White Rajah, had been the heir apparent to the Sarawak throne from 1848 until 1863, when his uncle, the first Rajah, had banished him from Sarawak and disinherited him.

Brooke had nine other siblings: Anne Violet (1893–1950), Beryl Mary (1894–1969), Alaric (1897–1962), John (b. 1899), Rupert (b. 1900), Joan (b. 1902), Mollie Laura (b. 1903), Ruth (b. 1904) and Bruce (b. 1906)

== Naval career ==
Educated at Malvern College, Brooke joined the Royal Navy as a cadet in 1913, seeing service during the First World War. He received a promotion to lieutenant in March 1918 and was promoted to lieutenant-commander in March 1926, after which he undertook the staff course at the Royal Naval College, Greenwich.

On 16 April 1925, he married Nora Evelyn Toppin (d. 1981); the couple had four children: Peter Barrington (1926–1998), Isabel Ann (1929–), Julian Hope (1930–) and Jennifer (1932–).

Brooke was promoted to commander in 1931. From November 1933 until February 1936, he commanded the cruiser HMS Philomel, also serving as naval officer-in-charge at Auckland. He then commanded the new cruiser HMS Orion on the America and West Indies station from August 1936 until June 1938, when he received a promotion to captain.

Just prior to the outbreak of hostilities in September 1939, Brooke was assigned to the cruiser HMS Curlew, which he commanded until it was sunk by the Luftwaffe off Narvik on 26 May 1940. He then became the captain of the light cruiser HMS Southampton from August of that year until it was also sunk of Malta by the Luftwaffe on 11 January 1941. He was promoted to commodore in February 1943, commanding Mobile Naval Base Defence Organisation 1 until that October.

In November, Brooke was given command of the battle cruiser HMS Renown, and held this command until July 1945. After the war, he served as commodore of the naval barracks at Chatham from January to April 1946. He was appointed a CBE in June 1946., and then was naval aide-de-camp to George VI from January to July 1947; in that month, he was promoted to rear-admiral. His last command was the shore establishment HMS Hawke at Exbury, Hampshire in 1948. Brooke was appointed a CB in the 1949 Birthday Honours, retiring in November. He was promoted to vice admiral on the retired list in December 1950.

== Later life ==
Brooke subsequently served as a Deputy lieutenant and JP for East Lothian. He died at Saffron Walden, Essex, on 20 January 1983, aged 87.

Many documents relating to the history of the Brooke family in Sarawak which had been passed down by his father were donated to the Bodleian Library in Oxford - initially at Rhodes House, subsequently the Weston Library - as the 'Basil Brooke Papers' (Mss.Pac.s.90). These have been digitised and made available online via the Brooke Trust.

== Cricket career ==
He made his first-class debut in 1919 against Cambridge University, taking the wicket of future England Test player George Wood. He played one more first-class match, also for the Royal Navy, against the British Army cricket team in 1926. In 1927, he played twice for Singapore against WAS Oldfield's XI.
