= Pioneer (1863 paddle steamer) =

New Zealand paddle-steamer gunboat

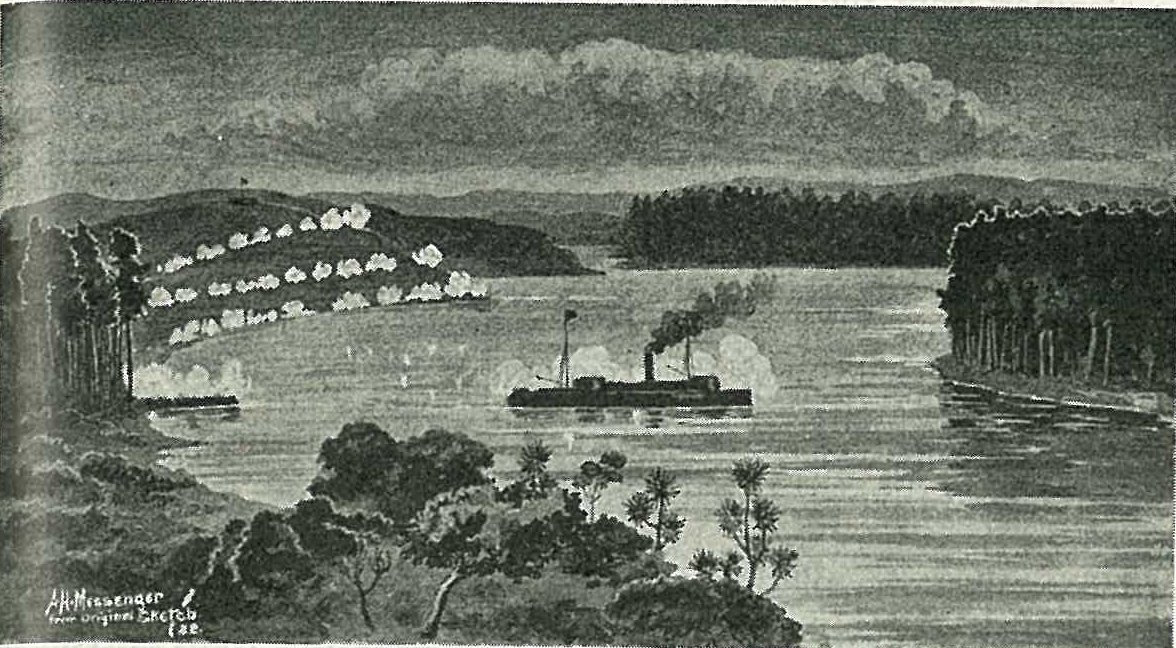
The gunboat Pioneer at Meremere during the Invasion of the Waikato.

Pioneer was a 19th-century paddle-steamer gunboat used in New Zealand for the invasion of the Waikato, able to carry up to 300 and with watertight compartments and forward and aft sliding keels. Built in Pyrmont shipyard, Sydney, in about 17 weeks, to the order of the New Zealand colonial government by the Australian Steam Navigation Company, she cost £9,500. Launched on 16 July 1863, she was towed across the Tasman Sea by HMS Eclipse, leaving Sydney on 22 September and arriving at Onehunga on 3 October 1863.

She was a flat-bottomed, stern-wheel paddle-steamer of 304 tons, made of 3/8 inch (9.5 mm) iron. She was 42.6 m (or 140 ft (43 m), or 153 ft (47 m)) long, 6 m (or 20 ft (6.1 m)) beam, and drew only 0.9 m (or 2.5 ft (0.76 m)) fully laden for travel on the Waikato River. With twin 30 hp (22 kW) engines and a 3.7 m (12 foot) diameter, 7 ft (2.1 m) wide, stern wheel, she had a trial speed of 10.5 knots (19.4 km/h; 12.1 mph). She had two iron cupolas or turrets, which were pierced for 14 rifles and 3 x 24 lb (11 kg) howitzers. The cupolas were 2.4 m (7.9 ft) high and 3.6 m (12 ft) in diameter.

She was manned by officers and men of the Royal Navy, two companies from HMS Curacoa; and flew the pendant of Commodore Sir William Wiseman of Curacoa. She proved of immense service in the skirmishing on the Waikato River in 1863 during the Waikato Campaign of the New Zealand Wars. On 24 October 1863 Eclipse towed her and 4 armoured barges, with 2 companies of seamen from HMS Curaçoa, to the Waikato. On 29 October shots were exchanged at Whangamarino, but there was no damage. On 31 October she landed 661 men and 2 x 12 lb (5.4 kg) Armstrong guns at Rangiriri. On 20 November 300 were landed to attack the rear of the Māori trenches.

On 24 December 1866, whilst awaiting repair, she broke her mooring at Port Waikato, drifted out to sea and, during an attempt to steam her into Manukau Harbour, was wrecked on the Manukau bar.

The two turrets are on display in Mercer (as part of the war memorial) and Ngāruawāhia. There are two engravings of her in action on the Waikato River in Ross and Howard, from the Illustrated London News.

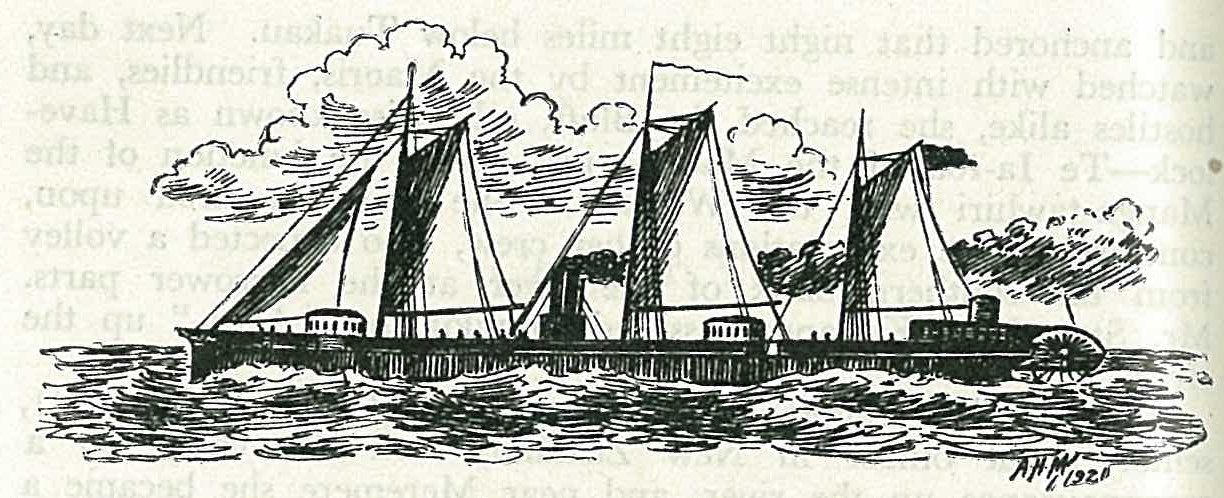
Pioneer, 1863–1866, was New Zealand's first purpose-built warship

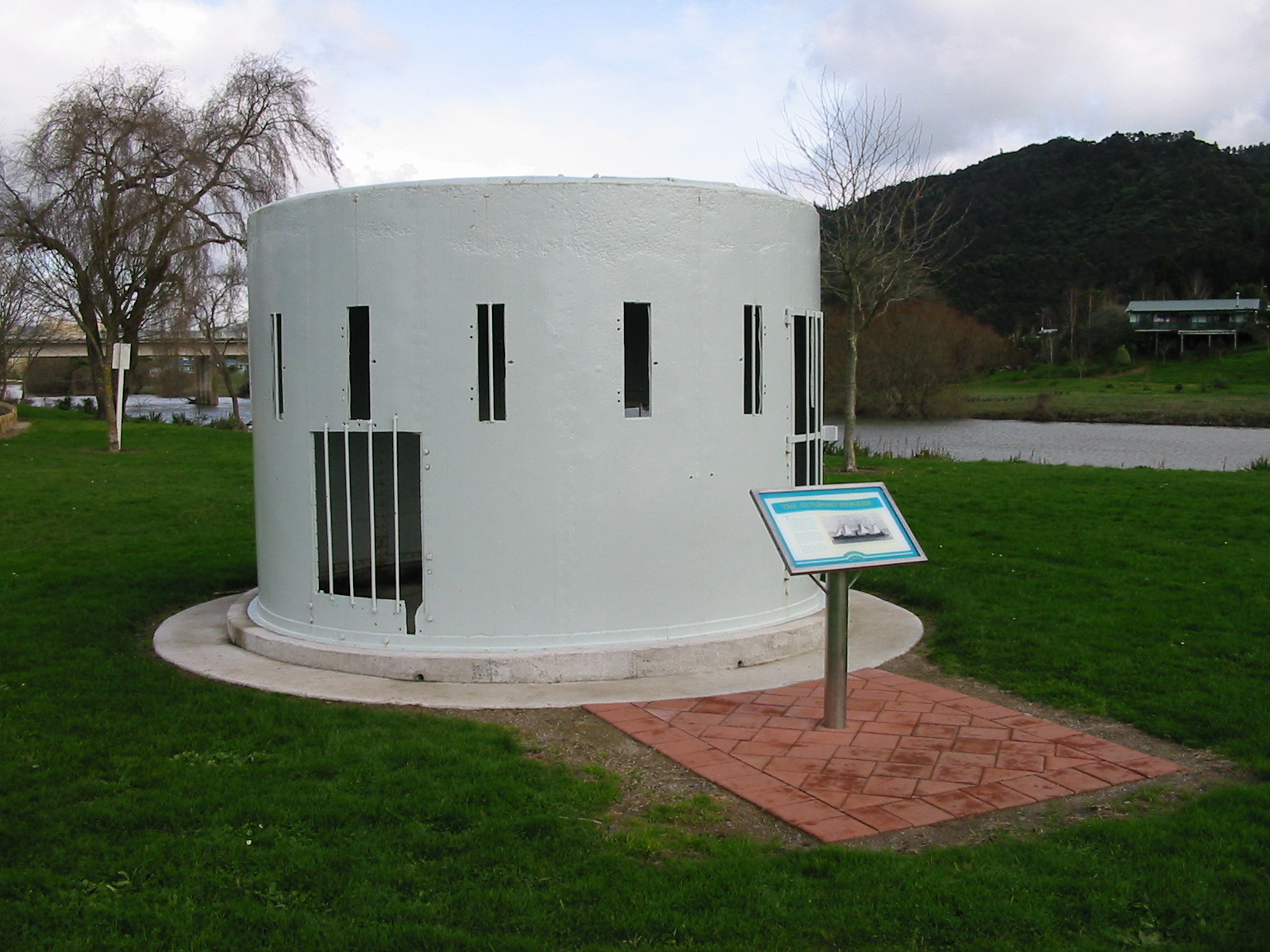
A turret on display at Ngāruawāhia

== See also ==
- Early naval vessels of New Zealand

== Bibliography ==
- Howard, Grant (1981): The Navy in New Zealand pages 11–12 (Reed, Wellington) ISBN 0-589-01355-6
- Ingram, C. W. N., and Wheatley, P. O., (1936) Shipwrecks: New Zealand disasters 1795–1936. Dunedin, NZ: Dunedin Book Publishing Association.
- Ross, J O’C (1967): The White Ensign in New Zealand pages 87–88 (Reed, Wellington)
- Taylor, T D (1948): New Zealand’s Naval Story pages 108-109 (Reed, Wellington)
- Entry in the Miramar Index
