= Admiral Brooke =

Admiral Brooke may refer to:

- Basil Brooke (Royal Navy officer, born 1895) (1895–1983), British Royal Navy vice admiral
- Richard Brooke (Norton) (died 1569), Vice-Admiral of England
- George Brooke-Pechell (1789–1860), British Royal Navy vice-admiral
