= Rangiriri (disambiguation) =

Rangiriri is a rural community in Waikato, New Zealand.

Rangiriri may refer to:

- Battle of Rangiriri, which took place there in 1863
- Rangiriri railway station, which operated from 1877 to 1957
- Rangiriri (paddle steamer), which operated from 1864 to 1889
- Rangiriri (New Zealand electorate), which existed from 1978 to 1984
