= Philomela (disambiguation) =

The name Philomela (Greek: Φιλομήλα, lover of song/music) of is derived from a figure in Greek mythology.

Philomela may refer to:

== Greek mythology ==
- Philomela (mythology), several mythological women

== Arts and letters ==
- Elizabeth Singer Rowe (1674–1737), an English poet, who published works under the name "Philomela"
- "Philomela" is a poem written in 1853 by English poet Matthew Arnold
- Philomela is a 2004 opera written by Scottish composer James Dillon

== Science ==
- 196 Philomela, an S-type asteroid located in the main asteroid belt between Mars and Jupiter
- Ypthima philomela is the scientific name of the baby fivering, a Satyrinae butterfly found in Asia
- Microcerculus philomela is the scientific name of the northern nightingale-wren, a passerine bird found in Central America

== See also ==
- Philomel (disambiguation) (another form of the name)
- The dictionary definition of Philomela at Wiktionary
