= Percival Hall-Thompson =

Royal Navy Admiral (1874-1950)

Admiral Percival Hall-Thompson CB CMG
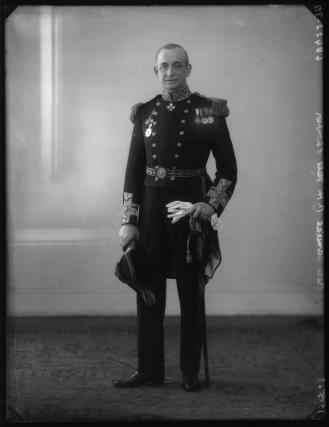
- Rear Admiral Percival Hall-Thompson c. mid-1920s
- Born: 5 May 1874; Totton and Eling, Hampshire
- Died: 6 July 1950 (aged 76)
- Military career
- Allegiance: United Kingdom
- Branch: Royal Navy
- Service years: 1887–1932
- Rank: Admiral
- Commands: Reserve Fleet (1929–30); 3rd Battle Squadron (1927–28); Chief of the Australian Naval Staff (1924–26); HMS Erin (1919–21); HMS Philomel (1914–19); HMS Medea (1909–12)
- Conflicts: First World War
- Awards: Companion of the Order of the Bath; Companion of the Order of St Michael and St George; Order of the Rising Sun, 3rd Class (Japan)

Admiral Percival Henry Hall-Thompson, CB, CMG (5 May 1874 – 6 July 1950) was a Royal Navy officer who played a key role in the development of the New Zealand Naval Forces and also served in the First World War as commander of HMS Philomel. He went on to be First Naval Member and Chief of the Australian Naval Staff.

== Early life ==
Hall-Thompson was born Percival Henry Hall Thompson, the son of Henry Hall Thompson and his wife, Agnes Spooner, on 5 May 1874 in Eling, Hampshire. Educated at a private school, he joined the Royal Navy in 1887 as a midshipman. He was posted to the training ship HMS Britannia as a cadet.

== Naval career ==
Hall Thompson served in a series of overseas postings, including a period in Australia as Inspector of War-like Stores at Garden Island, but by 1905 was based in London. He was promoted to post-captain in June 1913.

In 1913, through the passage of the Naval Defence Act 1913, the New Zealand government formed the New Zealand Naval Forces. This was in response to the desire of the New Zealand Minister of Defence at the time, James Allen, who wanted to establish a local naval force which would co-operate with the fledgling Royal Australian Navy. An approach was made to the British Admiralty for assistance and Hall-Thompson, who had hyphenated his name after his marriage to Helen Sidney Deacon in 1899, was accordingly appointed naval advisor to New Zealand. He commenced a three-year term on 1 May 1914, which also included command of HMS Philomel, a Pearl-class cruiser, loaned to New Zealand as a seagoing training cruiser. He arrived in New Zealand with his family on 24 June 1914 and settled in Wellington to begin implementing a training program for New Zealand cadets. He took Philomel on its first cruise in New Zealand service at the end of the following month but was almost immediately recalled to Wellington when it became apparent that war was to break out in Europe.

=== First World War ===
After Philomel was hastily refitted for war service, Hall-Thompson took her into the South Pacific as an escort to the Samoan Expeditionary Force that captured German Samoa in September 1914. She then escorted the main body of the New Zealand Expeditionary Force (NZEF) to Australia where it joined a convoy of troopships carrying men of the Australian Imperial Force (AIF) destined for Egypt. Philomel continued with the convoy as an escort and once it reached the Middle East, was detached for operations in the Persian Gulf.

By 1917, Philomel was worn out and returned to New Zealand. Despite his own desire to continue on operational service, Hall-Thompson's active participation in the war ended. Now back in New Zealand, he continued to advise the government on the development of the country's naval service. Late in 1917, the German raider ship SMS Wolf laid mines in New Zealand waters. Initially considering it implausible that a minefield was responsible for sunk shipping, Hall-Thompson organised the minesweeping operations of 1918 to clear them. For his services during the war, he was made a Companion of the Order of St Michael and St George and awarded the Order of the Rising Sun, 3rd Class, by Emperor Taishō of Japan.

=== Postwar period ===
In 1919, much to his disappointment as he enjoyed living in New Zealand, Hall-Thompson was recalled to England. The New Zealand defence minister at the time, James Allen, was also disappointed as he had established a good working relationship with Hall-Thompson.

In 1920 Hall-Thompson was given command of the battleship HMS Erin and two years later became Aide-de-Camp to the King. He contributed a chapter to a volume of the Official History of New Zealand's Effort in the Great War, writing about the work of Philomel and this was published in 1923. He was appointed First Naval Member & Chief of the Australian Naval Staff with effect from January 1924 and later that year was made a Companion of the Order of the Bath. He completed his term with the Australian Navy in 1926 and went on to command the 3rd Battle Squadron of the Atlantic Fleet from 1927 to 1928. He then led the Reserve Fleet for two years.

== Later life ==
Hall-Thompson retired in 1932 with the rank of admiral. He lived in Kent until he died on 6 July 1950, survived by his wife and four children. A son, Derrick, was also a career officer in the Royal Navy and ended his career as a rear admiral. A daughter, Mary (later Mary Austin), was awarded the DBE for community service in Australia.

== Notes ==
Military offices
Preceded by Sir Allan Everett	Chief of the Australian Naval Staff; 1924–1926	Succeeded by William Napier
Preceded by Sir William Boyle	Commander-in-Chief, Reserve Fleet; 1929–1930	Succeeded by Sir Frank Larken
