= Mary V. Austin =

Australian activist and community worker

Dame Mary V. Austin DBE
- Born: Mary Valentine Hall-Thompson; 29 July 1900
- Died: 10 September 1986 (aged 86)
- Occupations: Community worker and political activist

Dame Mary Valentine Austin DBE (née Hall-Thompson; 29 July 1900 – 10 September 1986) was an Australian community worker and political activist. The daughter of Admiral Percival Hall-Thompson and his wife, Helen (née Deacon), she was educated in New Zealand at Marsden College, Wellington.

== Affiliations ==
- Red Cross Society (Superintendent Regional Commandant, Victorian Division)
- Australian Liberal Party, Vice President, and later National Vice-president (1947–76)
- Victoria League, honorary life membership

== Damehood ==
She was appointed Dame Commander of the Order of the British Empire (DBE) in the 1979 Birthday Honours (16 June 1979) for community and welfare services.

== Family ==
She married Ronald Albert Austin (1893–1965) on 9 June 1925. The couple had one child, Derrick Albert Austin, who was born in 1926.

== Sources ==
- Draper, W J (ed.), Who's who in Australia, 1983, 14th edn, The Herald and Weekly Times, Melbourne, 1983
- Draper, W J (ed.), Who's who in Australia, 1980, 23rd edn, The Herald and Weekly Times, Melbourne, 1980, vol 928, page 68
