= New Zealand Naval Forces =

- Active: 1913–1921
- Country: United Kingdom
- Branch: Royal Navy
- Type: Fleet

Commanders
- Notable commanders: Captain, Percival Henry Hall-Thompson

New Zealand Naval Forces was the name given to a division of the Royal Navy. The division was formed in 1913 and it operated under this name until 1921, when it became the New Zealand Division of the Royal Navy.

== History ==
Originally the British Royal Navy provided total security for the colony of New Zealand, but in 1846 the settlers bought a gunboat. The Waikato Flotilla operated from 1860, and at the same time a Naval Artillery Volunteer corps was established to provide harbour defence. In 1884 the government purchased four spar torpedo boats, and starting in 1887 it funded ships of the Australasian Auxiliary Squadron.

Before establishment of the navy, the people of New Zealand paid for the building of the battlecruiser HMS New Zealand, which was at the Battle of Jutland.

In 1912 the then New Zealand Minister of Defence, James Allen, argued in London for the creation of a New Zealand division of the Royal Navy. Though this was opposed by the First Lord of the Admiralty, Winston Churchill, the Naval Defence Act 1913 (4 Geo V No 45) brought the division into existence. The Naval Defence Act authorised the Government to establish a naval force organisation which would pass to the control of the Admiralty in the event of war. The division was to be funded by the New Zealand government.

The light cruiser HMS Philomel was purchased from the Royal Navy to function as a training ship. In 1913 it became the first boat to be commissioned, under the command of Percival Hall-Thompson, into the New Zealand navy. Philomel escorted New Zealand land forces to occupy the German colony of Samoa in 1914 and saw further action under the command of the Royal Navy in the Mediterranean Sea, the Red Sea, and the Persian Gulf.

In 1919 Commodore, Alan Hotham was appointed commander-in-chief until 1921 when the New Zealand Naval Forces was renamed as the New Zealand Division of the Royal Navy.

== Commanders in chief ==
Included:

- Captain, Percival Henry Hall-Thompson, 1913-1919
- Commodore, Alan Hotham, 1919–1921.

== Sources ==
- Grant, H. (1981). The Navy in New Zealand : an illustrated history. Reed Publishing.
- Walters, Sydney David (1956) The Royal New Zealand Navy: Official History of World War II, 1939–1945, Department of Internal Affairs, Wellington Chapter 1: Genesis of the Royal New Zealand Navy
