= HMS Philomel =

Six ships of the Royal Navy have borne the name HMS Philomel, after Philomela, a figure in Greek mythology:

- HMS Philomel (1806) was an 18-gun Cruizer-class brig-sloop launched in 1806 and sold in 1817.
- HMS Philomel (1823) was a 10-gun Cherokee-class brig-sloop launched in 1823 and sold in 1833.
- HMS Philomel (1842) was an 8-gun brig launched in 1842. She was transferred to the Coastguard as a watchvessel in 1857 and was renamed WV23 in 1863. She foundered in 1869 and was sold in 1870 to be salvaged and broken up.
- HMS Philomel (1860) was a Philomel-class wooden screw gunvessel launched in 1860 and sold in 1865.
- HMS Philomel (1867) was a wooden screw gunvessel launched in 1867 and sold in 1886.
- HMS Philomel (1890) was a Pearl-class cruiser launched in 1890. She became a base ship in 1921, was sold in 1947 and scuttled in 1949.
