= HMS Esk =

HMS Esk may refer to one of the following Royal Navy ships named Esk after a Celtic word meaning a river:

- HMS Esk (1813), a 20-gun post ship launched in 1813. She was sold in 1829 and became the whaler Matilda, which between 1829 and 1845 made four voyages to the British southern whale fishery.
- HMS Esk (1854), a wood screw corvette launched in 1854. She was broken up in 1870.
- HMS Esk (1877), an iron screw gunboat launched in 1877. She was sold in 1903.
- HMS Esk (1905), a tender transferred from the War Department in 1905. She was sold in 1920.
- HMS Esk (H15), an E-class destroyer launched in 1934. She was sunk by a mine in 1940 north west of Texel.
