= Rangiriri (paddle steamer) =

Coordinates: 37°47′19″S 175°17′17″E

The Rangiriri was a 19th-century paddle-steamer gunboat used on the Waikato River in New Zealand. It brought the first Pākehā settlers to Hamilton in 1864 and served as a riverboat until it was wrecked in 1889. It is now located on the shore in Memorial Park, Hamilton East. It is the oldest surviving iron-hulled boat in new Zealand.

== Description and commissioning ==
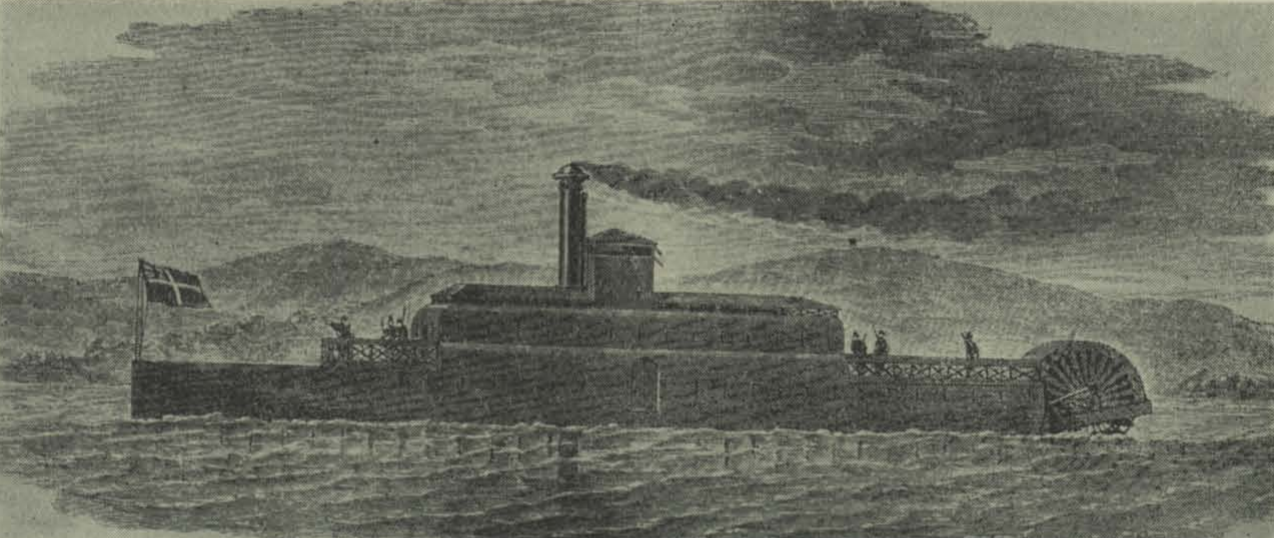
Illustration of the Rangiriri

The Rangiriri was a 30 ton, 30 hp (22 kW), stern wheel gunboat with two twelve-pounder in embrasures and one rocket tube. Her length was 90 ft 6 in (27.58 m), breadth 20 ft (6.1 m) and speed 6 knots (11 km/h; 6.9 mph). It had high bulwarks with 20–30 piercings for rifles on each side. The steamer had a tight turning circle which allowed it to navigate the twists and turns of the Waikato River with greater ease.

To prosecute the Invasion of the Waikato, the New Zealand colonial government required a fleet of river boats to transport troops and supplies upriver and provide artillery support. This Waikato Flotilla was characterised by historian Herbert Baillie as "the first New Zealand navy," but they were mostly crewed by Royal Navy personnel. These ships were ordered in October 1863 and the first of them, the Avon and the Pioneer, arrived in July and October 1863 respectively and saw action at various points in the campaign. The Rangiriri and her sister ship the Koheroa were designed by James Stewart, a Scottish civil engineer who had emigrated to New Zealand in 1859. He later described the Rangiriri as "hideously bluff at the bows, straight in the sides, and square in the stern." Stewart supervised the construction of both ships at the P.N. Russell & Co. foundry in Sydney. They were brought across the Tasman Sea in pieces on the Beautiful Star and reassembled by Stewart and James Bramwell Steedman at Port Waikato in April 1864 and launched on the 22nd. The Rangiriri was named after site of the decisive victory won by the colonial government the previous year.

== Service, wreck, and restoration ==
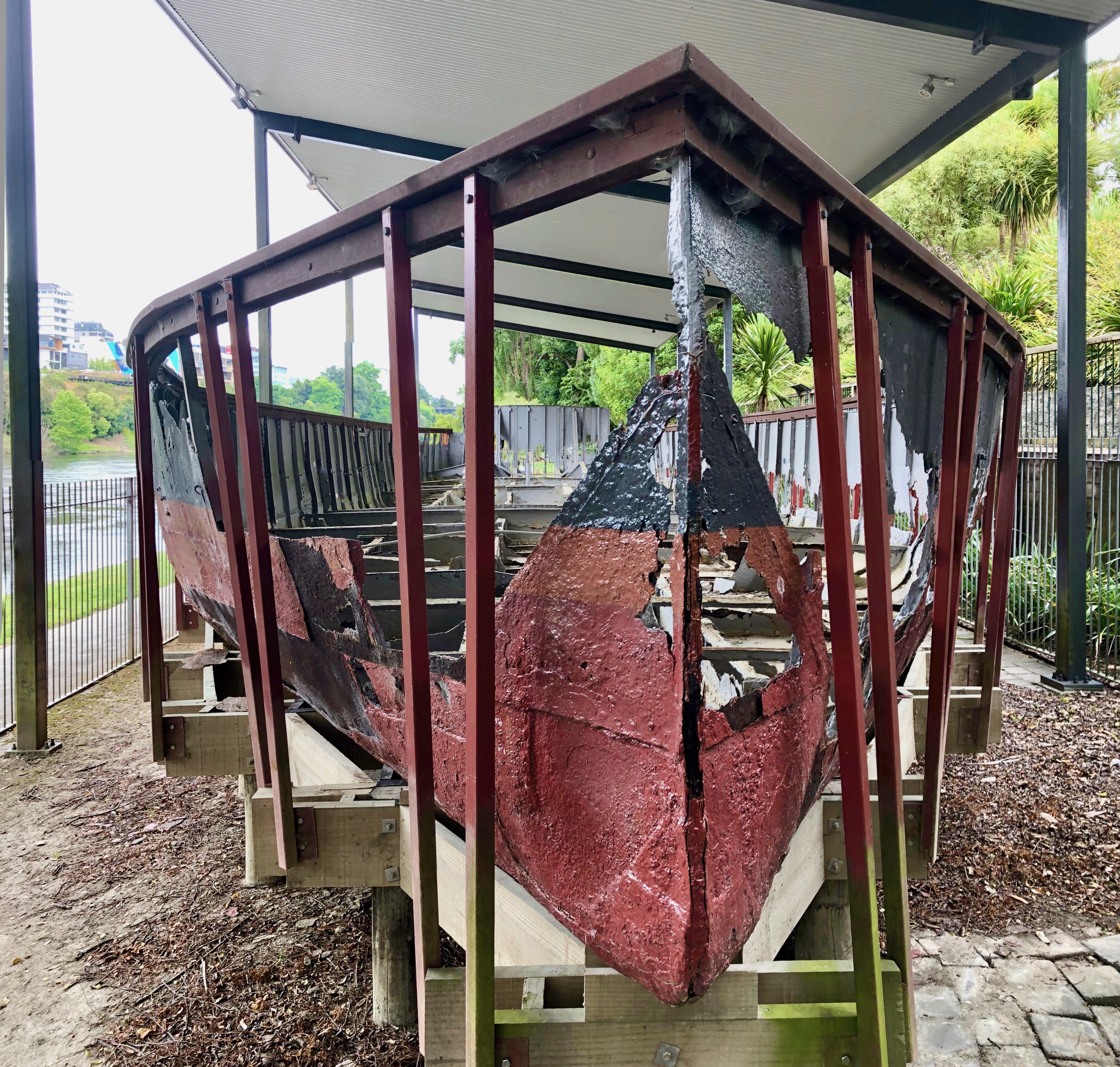
The Rangiriri in its protective structure at Memorial Park.

The Rangiriri arrived too late to participate in the fighting, but was used for transporting supplies and people. She brought the first military settlers to Hamilton on 24 August 1864. The settlers were the 4th Waikato Regiment Militia, led by Captain William Steele. The captain of the ship at this time was Captain William Turner, who subsequently operated Hamilton's first hotel. Māori of the local Ngāti Wairere tribe assembled on the banks of the river as she arrived and threw peaches at her. One of the passengers, Teresa Vowless, passed her baby to another passenger and leapt overboard in order to be the first settler ashore.

Along with the other steamers, the Rangiriri was sold to the Waikato Steam Navigation Company in 1870. WSN valued her at £1,800 in 1878. By 1885 WSN was losing money due to railway competition and had been wound up by 1886. Rangiriri was still a WSN asset when the company was liquidated in 1889,

She ran aground in 1889 and the engines were stripped for use in another steamer. The wreck was left on the east side of the river about 200 yards north of the Traffic Bridge, where it was used by local children as a swimming platform and became a minor local landmark. A committee was formed to raise the wreck in 1932, but came to nothing. In 1981 and 1982, the wreck was lifted from the riverbed and placed on the shore in Memorial Park. The wreck was left unprotected and suffered further degradation, rusting extensively. In 2004, Waikato Museum recommended that further restoration work be undertaken.

After a campaign led by city councillor Peter Bos, this restoration work was undertaken between 2007 and 2010. The Rangiriri was restored, desilted, and the hull was repainted in order to protect it from rust. A protective shelter was built for the wreck at its new site in Memorial Park, near the old jetty. The process cost the City Council NZ$ 243,000, plus an additional $181,000 from the New Zealand Lottery Grants Board. Mighty River Power and Environment Waikato also provided support. The new location was officially opened on 7 March 2010. William Puke of Ngati Wairere threw peaches at the boat as part of a historical re-enactment.

== Bibliography ==
- Akoorlie, Natalie (5 March 2010). "All hands on deck: gunboat restored". Stuff, Waikato Times.
- Baillie, Herbert (1921). "The First New Zealand Navy; with some Episodes of the Maori War in connection with the British Navy". Transactions and Proceedings of the Royal Society of New Zealand. 53: 29–36.
- Cowan, James (1955). The New Zealand Wars: A History of the Maori Campaigns and the Pioneering Period: Volume I: 1845–1864. Wellington: R. E. Owen. p. 311.
- Stewart Ball, Anne (1 October 2014). "s.s Rangiriri, P.N. Russell & Co. and Hamilton - 150 year Milestones". partofpastnzhistory.blogspot.co.nz.
- Swarbrick, Nancy (2015). "The Rangiriri paddle steamer". Te Ara: The Encyclopedia of New Zealand.
- Walker, Richard (23 February 2024). "A river, a boat and the current of history". The Waikato Times.
