= HMS Curacoa (1854) =

Frigate of the Royal Navy

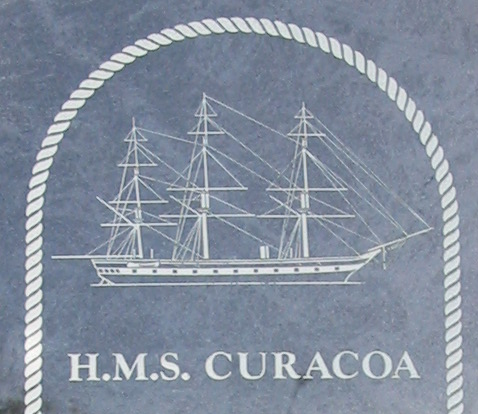

History

United Kingdom
- Name: HMS Curacoa
- Ordered: 4 April 1851; Reordered on 18 July 1851
- Builder: Pembroke Dockyard; Engines by Maudslay, Sons & Field
- Laid down: January 1852
- Launched: 13 April 1854
- Completed: By 14 November 1854
- Decommissioned: 1869
- Fate: Broken up by 17 July 1869

General characteristics
- Type: Tribune-class screw frigate
- Tons burthen: 1,569 24/94 bm
- Length: 192 ft (59 m) (overall); 163 ft 4 in (49.8 m) (keel)
- Beam: 43 ft (13 m)
- Depth of hold: 12 ft 11 in (3.94 m)
- Propulsion: Sails; 2-cyl. horizontal single expansion; Single screw; 350 nhp; 1,354 ihp
- Speed: 10.75 knots (19.91 km/h) (under steam)
- Complement: 300
- Armament: Middle deck: 20 x 32 pdrs (56cwt/9ft 6in); Upper deck: 10 x 32 pdrs (42cwt/8ft 0in) + 1 x 10in (85cwt/9ft 4in) on pivot

HMS Curacoa was a 31-gun Tribune-class screw frigate launched on 13 April 1854 from Pembroke Dockyard. She was the second Royal Navy ship to be named after the island of Curaçao, at that time still commonly known as "Curacoa" by English speakers.

She served in the Mediterranean Station between 1854 until 1857 and was in the Black Sea during the Crimean War. She was part of the Channel Squadron between 1857 until 1859. On 24 October 1858, Curacoa ran aground on the Pelican Reef, off Smyrna, Ottoman Empire. All on board were rescued. She was refloated on 26 October with assistance from USS Macedonian and taken into Smyrna on 28 October. On 4 February 1859, Curacoa collided with the British merchant ship Fleta in the English Channel. She then was sent to North America and West Indies Station and served between 1859 until 1862. Afterward, she went to the Australia Station, where she remained until 1866. She was the flagship of the Australia Station from 20 April 1863 until May 1866, having had her armament reduced to 23 guns in 1863.

Curacoa Island, off the Queensland coast, is named after HMS Curacoa.

During the invasion of Waikato, her company provided reinforcements for the Naval Brigade at Auckland, New Zealand on 2 October 1863. She was sent back to Britain in 1866 and was broken up in 1869.

== See also ==
- European and American voyages of scientific exploration
