= HMS Philomel (1842) =

History

United Kingdom
- Name: HMS Philomel
- Ordered: 24 May 1840
- Laid down: April 1840
- Launched: 28 March 1842
- Commissioned: 16 July 1842
- Renamed: CGWV.23 on 25 May 1863
- Fate: Foundered in the Swale, 1869. Wreck sold and broken up 26 February 1870.

General characteristics
- Class & type: Alert-class packet brig
- Propulsion: Sails
- Complement: 44
- Armament: 8 x 16 pdrs

HMS Philomel was an eight-gun Alert-class packet brig of the Royal Navy, built between 1840 and 1842. Ships of this class were designed by William Symonds in 1834, and the Philomel was built at Plymouth.

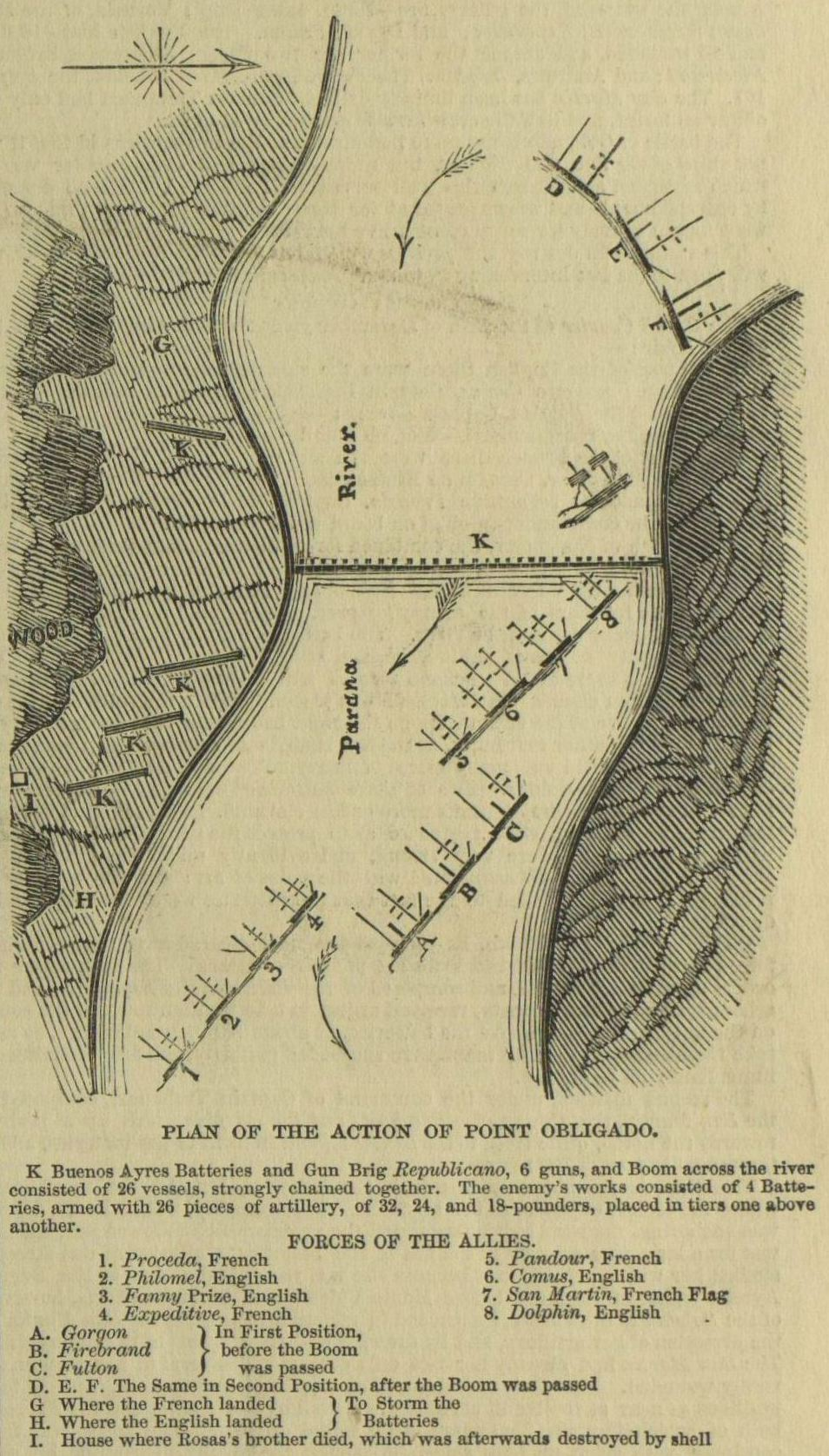
Philomel in action at the Battle of Vuelta de Obligado in 1846

The vessel launched in 1842 as a surveying vessel, and by 1857 was given over to the coastguard and renamed CGWV.23.

It foundered in The Swale in 1869, and the wreck was sold to Hayhurst & Clasper as salvage. It was finally broken up on 26 February 1870.

The Falkland Islands issued a set of stamps in 1985 for "Early Cartographers maps", the ship is featured on the fourth in set, 54p stamp along with Admiral Sir B. J. Sulivan K.C.B.
