= HMS Philomel (1890) =

Pearl-class cruiser

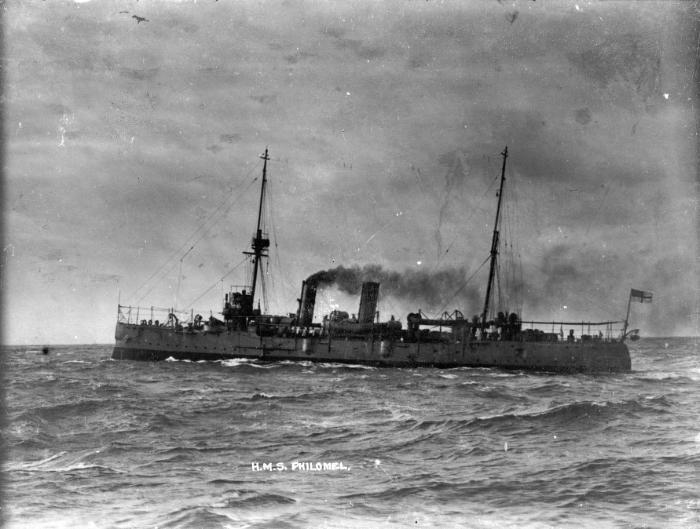
- HMS Philomel in New Zealand service

History

United Kingdom
- Name: Philomel
- Builder: HM Naval Dockyard, Plymouth
- Launched: 28 August 1890
- Commissioned: 1890
- Decommissioned: 1941
- Fate: Formally transferred to Royal New Zealand Navy

New Zealand
- Commissioned: 1941
- Decommissioned: 1947
- Fate: Sunk at Coromandel 6 August 1949

General characteristics
- Class & type: Pearl-class cruiser
- Displacement: 2,575 long tons (2,616 t)
- Length: 278 ft (84.7 m)
- Beam: 41 ft (12.5 m)
- Draught: 17 ft 6 in (5.33 m)
- Installed power: 7,500 ihp (5,600 kW) on forced draught
- Propulsion: 2 × 3-cylinder triple-expansion steam engines; 4 × double-ended cylindrical boilers; 2 screws
- Speed: 19 knots (35 km/h; 22 mph)
- Complement: 220
- Armament: 8 × QF 4.7-inch (120 mm) guns; 8 × 3-pounder (1.4 kg) guns; 4 × machine-guns; 2 × 14-inch (356 mm) torpedo tubes

HMS Philomel, later HMNZS Philomel, was a Pearl-class cruiser. She was the fifth ship of that name and served with the Royal Navy. After her commissioning in 1890, she served on the Cape of Good Hope Station and later with the Mediterranean Fleet.

In 1914, she was loaned to New Zealand for service with what would later become the Royal New Zealand Navy. During the early stages of the First World War she performed convoy escort duties and then carried out operations in the Mediterranean against the Turks. She later conducted patrols in the Red Sea and Persian Gulf.

By 1917, she was worn out and dispatched back to New Zealand where she served as a depot ship in Wellington Harbour for minesweepers. In 1921 she was transferred to the Devonport Naval Base in Auckland for service as a training ship. Decommissioned and sold for scrap in 1947, her hulk was scuttled in 1949.

== Design and description ==
HMS Philomel was laid down on 9 May 1889 at HM Naval Dockyard in Devonport, Plymouth. Her name is derived from Philomela, in Greek mythology the daughter of Pandion I, King of Athens, and was the fifth ship to be so named.

The ship had an overall length of 278 feet (84.7 m), a beam of 41 feet (12.5 m) and a draught of 17 feet 6 inches (5.3 m). She displaced 2,575 long tons (2,616 t). Propulsion was through 3-cylinder triple-expansion steam engines, driving two shafts, which produced a total of 7,500 indicated horsepower (5,600 kW) and gave a maximum speed of 19 knots (35 km/h; 22 mph). She was also rigged for sail and when installing the foremast, workmen noticed it was stamped "Devonport Dockyard 1757". Her main armament consisted of eight QF 4.7-inch (120 mm) guns with a secondary armament of eight 3-pounders. As well as four machine guns, the ship also mounted two submerged 14-inch (360 mm) torpedo tubes.

Philomel was launched on 28 August 1890, and completed the following March. After completing sea trials, she was commissioned in the Royal Navy on 10 November 1891. Commanded by Captain Charles Campbell, she was assigned to the Cape of Good Hope Station although fitting work and working up trials meant that Philomel did not arrive in South Africa until June 1892.

== Operational history ==
For six years, Philomel served on station, intercepting slave traders along the coast of Africa. In 1896, she participated in the Anglo-Zanzibar War, during which rebels murdered the Sultan of Zanzibar and seized his palace. Along with the three gunboats and HMS St George, she bombarded the palace fortress and the only ship of the Zanzibar Navy, HHS Glasgow. This action lasted less than an hour and resulted in the routing of the rebels. The following year, Philomel was transferred to the West Africa component of the Cape of Good Hope Station and participated in the Benin Expedition.

A refit was completed in 1898 after which Philomel returned to Cape of Good Hope Station. She served throughout the Second Boer War. Some of her complement of 220 men served in the field with the Naval Brigade. Two of her 4.7-inch guns were disembarked and used in the Battle of Colenso. After the war, she returned to Devonport and was paid off on 22 March 1902. She was laid up in the Firth of Forth for several years before a refit was carried out in 1907 at Haulbowline Dock in Ireland. During her tow to Ireland she went adrift for a night in the North Sea when the rope to the towing vessel, HMS Hampshire, broke.

Philomel was recommissioned in February 1908 for service with the Mediterranean Fleet under the command of Captain John Seagrave. She provided assistance in the wake of the earthquake at Messina in Sicily. The following year she served with the East Indies Station, running patrols from Aden in the Persian Gulf for two years and served in operations off Somaliland, 1908–1910.

=== Transfer to New Zealand ===
In 1913 the Admiralty agreed to lend Philomel to New Zealand as a seagoing training cruiser to form the nucleus of the newly established New Zealand Naval Forces, which was a new division of the Royal Navy. This was in response to the desire of the New Zealand Minister of Defence at the time, James Allen, who wanted to establish a local naval force which would co-operate with the fledgling Royal Australian Navy.

Philomel was recommissioned in October 1913 in Singapore and later sailed for New Zealand to join HMAS Psyche and HMAS Pyramus, both Pelorus-class cruisers serving in New Zealand waters. Philomel was commissioned for New Zealand service on 15 July 1914, under the command of Captain Percival Hall-Thompson. Although mainly crewed by Englishmen, she was the country's first warship.

=== First World War ===
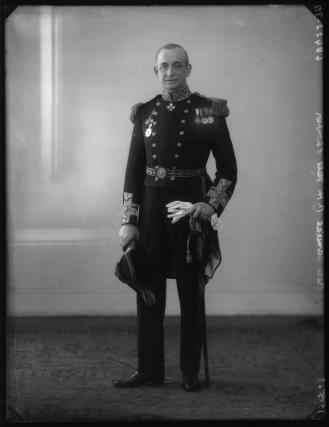
Captain P. Hall-Thompson, who commanded HMS Philomel for most of the First World War

Philomel was on a short shakedown voyage to Picton on 30 July 1914, prior to taking on its first complement of New Zealand cadets, when it was recalled to Wellington Harbour in anticipation of the outbreak of war. Largely crewed by personnel from the Royal Navy, volunteers were brought on board to bring the ship up to full strength and after stocking up with supplies, she departed for Auckland to await further instructions. On 15 August 1914 she formed part of the ocean escort for the New Zealand forces that were dispatched to occupy German Samoa (now Samoa). The escort would have been unlikely to offer much resistance to the German cruisers SMS Scharnhorst and SMS Gneisenau that were known to be in the area. Fortunately, the convoy did not encounter the German ships. Philomel then steamed for the Kingdom of Tonga to deliver news of the hostilities with Imperial Germany before returning to New Zealand.

By now the main body of the New Zealand Expeditionary Force, formed for service overseas, were ready to embark from Wellington on a convoy for the Middle East. Philomel escorted the convoy as far as Western Australia. Then, along with Pyramus, she sailed northeastwards for Singapore in search of the German cruiser SMS Emden, which was then carrying out raids in the Indian Ocean. The two ships, which would have been outgunned by the more modern Emden, had reached Christmas Island when they received news of Emden's sinking by HMAS Sydney. They arrived in Singapore on 12 November from where Philomel continued onto Port Said, escorting three French troopships.

From late 1914, Philomel, needing maintenance and an update of equipment, was berthed at Malta and underwent an overhaul. This was completed by late January 1915 and she then started operations in the Mediterranean against the Turks. On 8 February she landed an armed party in Southern Turkey where a large force of Turkish soldiers were encountered, resulting in three seamen being killed and three wounded. This action marked the first deaths in the war of New Zealanders serving with a New Zealand formation.

Subsequently, Philomel was deployed in the Red Sea and in the Persian Gulf for much of the remainder of the year. In December 1915 she sailed to Bombay for maintenance work but was back in the Persian Gulf in January 1916, continuing her patrolling. By the end of the year, her engines were giving trouble and her stern glands were worn out. A lengthy and costly refit was required and rather than incur this cost for a ship which was nearly at the end of her operational life, the Admiralty decided to give her to New Zealand and dispatched her home to be paid off. She duly arrived in Wellington Harbour in March 1917. A large portion of her Royal Navy crew were returned to England to be assigned to other berths. Armament removed, Philomel was recommissioned as a depot ship in Wellington, supporting minesweeping operations until May 1919.

=== Postwar service ===
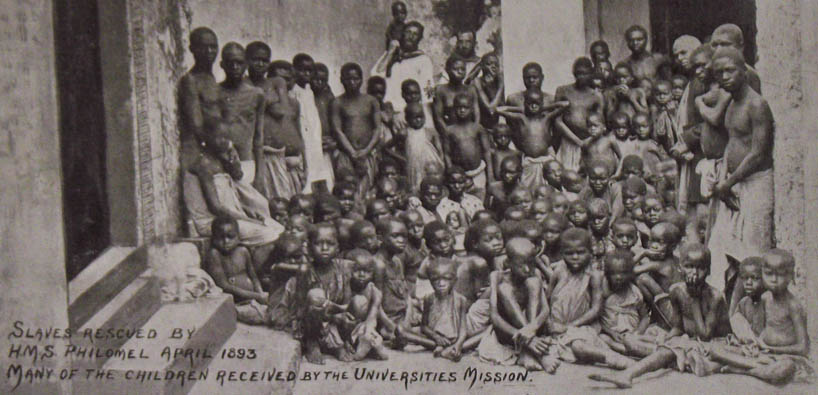
Slaves rescued by HMS 'Philomel', April 1893, Many of the children received by the Universities Mission.

In March 1921, on the creation of the New Zealand Division of the Royal Navy, Philomel was recommissioned as a training base. She steamed from her berth at Wellington to the dockyard at the Devonport Naval Base in Auckland. Moored alongside the training jetty, she was operated as a training facility for new recruits to the naval service, under the command of a series of officers from the Royal Navy including, for nearly six months in 1923, Commander Augustus Agar VC. Training armament was installed and in 1925, her boilers and engines were removed to create more accommodation space. Further accommodation, in the form of wooden cabins, was later constructed on her deck. In October 1941, on the creation of the Royal New Zealand Navy, Philomel was recommissioned as the training base HMNZS Philomel.

=== Fate ===
Philomel was paid off and decommissioned on 17 January 1947 and her name transferred to the Devonport Naval Shore Establishment. The training function was taken over by HMNZS Tamaki, a shore station on Motuihe Island in the Hauraki Gulf. On the day of her decommissioning, the New Zealand Naval Board sent a signal to Philomel which stated:

"...their regret at the passing from the service of the first of His Majesty's New Zealand Ships, a ship that has meant so much to all who served in her. She goes as many good ships have gone before her, but when HMNZS Philomel's colours are hauled down at sunset this evening, the tradition which she has established during her long career will live on in the depot to which she has given her name."

The hulk of Philomel was sold to Strongman Shipping Company, based in Coromandel. She was towed and deliberately run aground in Coromandel harbour, near the wharf. After her fittings and parts were removed, she was towed out to sea and sunk in 100 fathoms near Cuvier Island on 6 August 1949, when sunk she was just 22 days shy of 59 years afloat. Much of the teak timber and some fittings went into a newly built coaster named Coromel, an amalgamation of Coromandel and Philomel, while the mainmast used at HMNZS Tamaki. Her crest is mounted to the gate of the Devonport Naval Base and her builders plate is on display in the William Sanders building which serves as the administrative Headquarters of the shore establishment.
