= Lake baronets of Middle Temple (1711) =

The Lake baronetcy of the Middle Temple, was created in the Baronetage of Great Britain on 17 October 1711 for Bibye Lake, Sub-Governor of the African Company. He was the great-nephew and heir of Sir Edward Lake, 1st Baronet of Carnow.

Initially the baronetcy was passed down to eldest sons. The 6th Baronet died in 1897 without issue. The title passed to his nephew St Vincent Atwell Lake, the 7th Baronet. The 8th Baronetcy was his uncle, Arthur Johnstone Lake, a son of Capt. Edward Lake. In due course, Atwell Henry Lake, a grandson of Sir Henry Atwell Lake, was 9th Baronet. He was succeeded by his son, Sir (Atwell) Graham Lake, 10th Baronet (1923–2013).

== Lake baronets, of Middle Temple (1711) ==
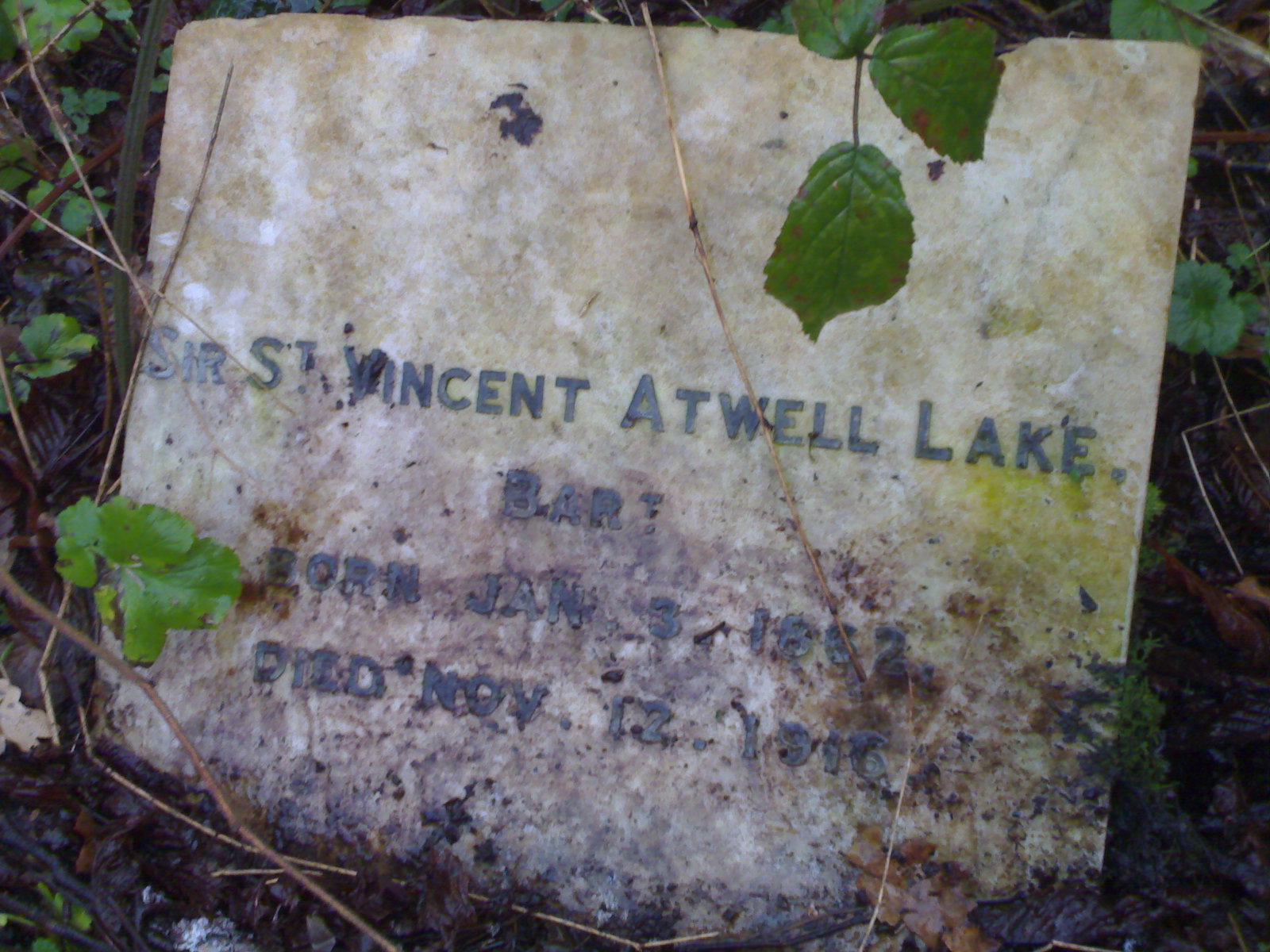
Gravestone of Sir St Vincent Atwell Lake, 7th Baronet

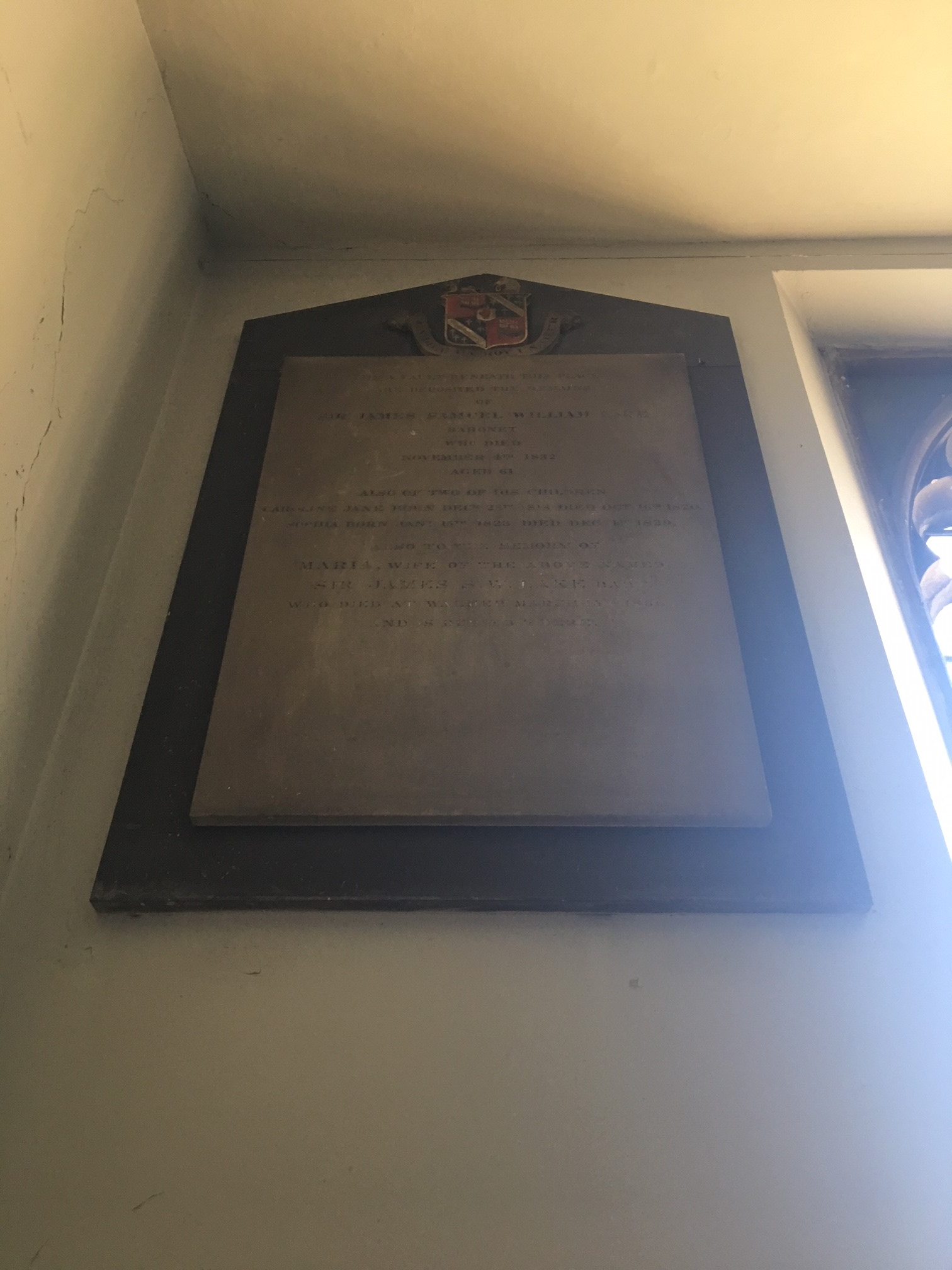
Memorial to Sir James Samuel William Lake, 4th Baronet, St George's Church, Ramsgate

- Sir Bibye Lake, 1st Baronet (1684–1744)
- Sir Atwell Lake, 2nd Baronet (1713–1760)
- Sir James Winter Lake, 3rd Baronet (c. 1745–1807)
- Sir James Samuel William Lake, 4th Baronet (c. 1772–1832)
- Sir James Samuel Lake, 5th Baronet (1805–1846)
- Sir Atwell King Lake, 6th Baronet (1834–1897)
- Sir St Vincent Atwell Lake, 7th Baronet (1862–1916)
- Sir Arthur Johnstone Lake, 8th Baronet (1849–1924)
- Sir Atwell Henry Lake, 9th Baronet (1891–1972)
- Sir (Atwell) Graham Lake, 10th Baronet (1923–2013)
- Sir Edward Geoffrey Lake, 11th Baronet (1928–2023)
- Sir Mark Winter Lake, 12th Baronet (born 1968)

The heir presumptive to the title is the present baronet's fourth cousin Andrew Winter Lake (born 1962). He has a son, Daniel James (born 1997), who is next in remainder.

== Notes ==
Baronetage of Great Britain
| Preceded by Lambert baronets | Lake baronets of Middle Temple; 17 October 1711 | Succeeded by Calverley baronets |
