= Admiral Paget =

Admiral Paget may refer to:

- Alfred Paget (Royal Navy officer) (1852–1918), British Royal Navy admiral
- Charles Paget (Royal Navy officer) (1778–1839), British Royal Navy vice admiral
- Lord Clarence Paget (1811–1895), British Royal Navy admiral
