= Admiral Forbes =

Admiral Forbes may refer to:

- Arthur Forbes (Royal Navy officer) (died 1891), British Royal Navy admiral
- Charles Forbes (Royal Navy officer) (1880–1960), British Royal Navy admiral
- George Forbes, 3rd Earl of Granard (1685–1765), British Royal Navy vice admiral
- Ian Forbes (born 1946), British Royal Navy admiral
- John Forbes (Royal Navy officer) (1714–1796), British Royal Navy admiral
- John Morrison Forbes (1925–2021), British Royal Navy vice admiral

== See also ==
- Arthur Forbes-Sempill (1877–1962), British Royal Navy rear admiral
