= Frederick Warden =

Rear-Admiral Frederick Warden CB
- Born: 18 November 1807
- Died: 11 November 1869 (aged 62)
- Military career
- Allegiance: United Kingdom
- Branch: Royal Navy
- Service years: 1820–1869
- Rank: Rear-Admiral
- Commands: HMS Retribution; HMS Ajax; HMS Hibernia; HMS Redpole; Channel Fleet
- Conflicts: Oriental Crisis; Crimean War
- Awards: Companion of the Order of the Bath

Rear-Admiral Frederick Warden CB (18 November 1807 – 11 November 1869) was a Royal Navy officer who went on to be Commander-in-Chief, Channel Squadron.

== Naval career ==
Warden joined the Royal Navy as a cadet in 1820. He served off the coast of Syria during the Oriental Crisis in 1840. Promoted to captain in 1845, he was given command of HMS Retribution in 1850 and then HMS Ajax which was used as mobile maritime battery in the Baltic Sea during the Crimean War. He later commanded HMS Hibernia and then HMS Redpole.

He was appointed Commander-in-Chief, Channel Squadron in 1867 and Commander-in-Chief, Queenstown in December 1868. He arrived from Lisbon to take command at Queenstown aboard HMS Helicon, despatch vessel, on 28 December 1868. He died in office in Queenstown on 11 November 1869.

He lived at Barham Lodge in Weybridge.

== See also ==
- O'Byrne, William Richard (1849). "Warden, Frederick" . A Naval Biographical Dictionary . John Murray – via Wikisource.

Military offices
Preceded by Sir Hastings Yelverton	Commander-in-Chief, Channel Fleet; 1867–1868	Succeeded by Sir Thomas Symonds
Preceded by Claude Buckle	Commander-in-Chief, Queenstown; 1868–1869	Succeeded by Arthur Forbes
