= Admiral Buckle =

Admiral Buckle may refer to:

- Claude Buckle (Royal Navy officer, born 1803) (1803–1894), British Royal Navy admiral
- Claude Buckle (Royal Navy officer, born 1839) (1839–1930), British Royal Navy admiral
- Matthew Buckle (1716–1784), British Royal Navy admiral
