= Admiral Hillyar =

Admiral Hillyar may refer to:

- Charles Hillyar (1817–1888), British Royal Navy admiral
- Henry Hillyar (1819–1893), British Royal Navy admiral
- James Hillyar (1769–1843), British Royal Navy admiral
