= Edmund Heathcote =

Admiral Edmund Heathcote
- Born: 29 January 1814
- Died: 24 October 1881 (aged 67)
- Military career
- Allegiance: United Kingdom
- Branch: Royal Navy
- Rank: Admiral
- Commands: HMS Highflyer; HMS Archer; HMS Doris; HMS Ajax; HMS Hawke; HMS Frederick William; Commander-in-Chief, Queenstown

Admiral Edmund Heathcote (29 January 1814 – 24 October 1881) was a Royal Navy officer who became Commander-in-Chief, Queenstown.

== Early life ==
Heathcote was born in Hursley, Hampshire, England. He was the fourth son of Samuel Heathcote and Catherine Pickering.

On 14 July 1844, in St. John's, Newfoundland, Edmund married his first wife, Elizabeth Lucy Law with whom he had two sons. In 1850, Lucy bore a third child, whose father was not Edmund; the couple were divorced on 9 March 1851, and Lucy appears to have taken their elder son, William (1845-1884), as well as her young child, to Australia, where her child's father had been transported for seven years penal servitude; William and Lucy both died in Australia.

On 19 August 1852, Edmund married Jessie Hill, at St. Paul's Cathedral in Halifax, Nova Scotia. Very soon thereafter, the couple returned to England and settled in Fritham, Hampshire, where their three children were born.

== Naval career ==
Heathcote became commanding officer of the frigate HMS Highflyer in December 1852, commanding officer of the sloop HMS Archer in February 1854 and commanding officer of the frigate HMS Doris in March 1859. He went on to be commanding officer of the third-rate HMS Ajax in February 1861, commanding officer of the third-rate HMS Hawke in January 1864 and commanding officer of the first-rate HMS Frederick William in March 1865. His last appointment was as Commander-in-Chief, Queenstown in May 1871 before he retired in January 1874.

Heathcote died in Fritham, Hampshire in 1881.

Military offices
Preceded by Arthur Forbes	Commander-in-Chief, Queenstown; 1871–1874	Succeeded by Robert Coote
