= List of shipwrecks in June 1869 =

The list of shipwrecks in June 1869 includes ships sunk, foundered, grounded, or otherwise lost during June 1869.

== 1 June ==
List of shipwrecks: 1 June 1869
Ship	State	Description
Caspar Wildt	Norway	The brig ran aground at Carlisle Point, County Cork, United Kingdom. She was on a voyage from Queenstown, County Cork to Bristol, Gloucestershire, United Kingdom. She was refloated the next day and resumed her voyage.
Courier	United Kingdom	The schooner was damaged by an onboard explosion. She was on a voyage from Newport, Monmouthshire to Dublin. She was taken in to Dublin.
Herthina	Sweden	The cutter sprang a leak and was abandoned in the Atlantic Ocean 60 nautical miles (110 km) off Porto, Portugal. Her five crew were rescued by the brigantine Rose (Flag unknown). Herthina was on a voyage from Helsingborg to Figueira da Foz, Portugal.
Two Brothers	United Kingdom	The ship was driven ashore at Burnham Overy Staithe, Norfolk. She was on a voyage from Newcastle upon Tyne, Northumberland to Burnham Overy Staithe. She was refloated the next day.

== 2 June ==
List of shipwrecks: 2 June 1869
Ship	State	Description
Early Dawn	United Kingdom	The ship struck a rock off Cape São Roque, Brazil and was wrecked. She was on a voyage from London to Brisbane, Queensland.
Fanny	Portugal	The steamship was taken in to Holyhead, Anglesey, United Kingdom in a waterlogged condition by the steamship Christiania (Norway).
Resolution	United Kingdom	The fishing trawler was run down and sunk by the steamship City of Rio de Janeiro (United Kingdom). Her crew were rescued.
Sverige	Sweden	The steamship ran aground on the Schulhock Bank. She was on a voyage from Rotterdam, South Holland, Netherlands to Danzig. She was refloated.
Wigoline	United Kingdom	The schooner ran aground at Yarmouth, Isle of Wight. She was on a voyage from Llanelly, Glamorgan to Yarmouth. She was refloated and taken in to Yarmouth.

== 3 June ==
List of shipwrecks: 3 June 1869
Ship	State	Description
Alexius Acatos, and Milan	Austria-Hungary); United Kingdom	The steamship Alexius Acatos collided with the steamship Milan and foundered in the Atlantic Ocean off the coast of Portugal. Her crew were rescued by Milan. Alexius Acatos was on a voyage from Sulina, Ottoman Empire to Dunkirk, Nord, France. Milan was on a voyage from Liverpool, Lancashire to Alexandria, Egypt. She put in to Lisbon, Portugal in a severely damaged condition and was beached.
Findon	United Kingdom	The brig foundered in the North Sea off Scarborough, Yorkshire. Her seven crew survived.

== 4 June ==
List of shipwrecks: 4 June 1869
Ship	State	Description
Belmont	United Kingdom	The ship was driven ashore at Kamouraska, Quebec, Canada. She was on a voyage from Quebec City to Plymouth, Devon. she was refloated the next day and resumed her voyage.
Mary Lord	United Kingdom	The barque collided with the steamship RMS Macgregor Laird (United Kingdom) in the River Mersey and was severely damaged. She was taken in to Liverpool, Lancashire.
Sappho	United Kingdom	The barque was wrecked at Kilmore, County Wexford. She was on a voyage from Maceió, Brazil to Liverpool.
The Fisher	United Kingdom	The smack capsized off the Isle of Arran with the loss of three of the four people on board. She was towed in to Millport, Cumbrae, Argyllshire the next day.

== 5 June ==
List of shipwrecks: 5 June 1869
Ship	State	Description
Bucentaur	United Kingdom	The ship was wrecked on the Prongs, off Colaba, India. Her crew were rescued. She was on a voyage from Liverpool, Lancashire to Bombay, India.
HMS Cadmus	Royal Navy	The Pearl-class corvette struck rocks at Salcombe, Devon and was severely damaged. She was consequently beached. She was refloated the next day and taken in to Devonport, Devon.
Caroline	United Kingdom	The smack sprang a leak and foundered in the Irish Sea 25 nautical miles (46 km) south east by south of Douglas, Isle of Man. She was on a voyage from Garston, Lancashire to Douglas.
Dove	New Zealand	The schooner was holed on rocks and foundered at McIntosh Bay, Banks Peninsula.
Edith Maria	United Kingdom	The ship was driven ashore in Brixton Bay, Isle of Wight. She was on a voyage from Pará, Brazil to Hull, Yorkshire. She was refloated on 7 June and towed in to Cowes, Isle of Wight.
Great Northern	United Kingdom	The ship was wrecked at Bassein, India with the loss of fifteen of her crew. She was on a voyage from Liverpool to Bombay, India.

== 6 June ==
List of shipwrecks: 6 June 1869
Ship	State	Description
Abraham	Denmark	The schooner was driven ashore and wrecked near Lemvig. Her crew were rescued. She was on a voyage from Hartlepool, County Durham, United Kingdom to Copenhagen.
Henrietta	United Kingdom	The ship foundered in the North Sea off Cromer, Norfolk. Her crew were rescued. She was on a voyage from Honfleur, Manche to Boston, Lincolnshire.
Kalauno	United Kingdom	The brig was wrecked in Sandy Bay, Bahamas. She was on a voyage from Cárdenas, Cuba to Portland .

== 7 June ==
List of shipwrecks: 7 June 1869
Ship	State	Description
St. Andrew	Canada	The ship departed from Akyab, Burma for Queenstown, County Cork, United Kingdom. No further trace, presumed foundered with the loss of all hands.

== 8 June ==
List of shipwrecks: 8 June 1869
Ship	State	Description
Admiral Napier	United Kingdom	The ship foundered in the Irish Sea. She was on a voyage from Liverpool, Lancashire to Aberdeen. Her owner and captain were convicted of scuttling the ship in an attempted insurance fraud.
Aurora	Prussia	The schooner was destroyed by fire at Buenos Aires, Argentina.
Edmund Preston	United Kingdom	The ship was sighted off Cape Horn, Chile whilst on a voyage from Newcastle upon Tyne, Northumberland to Valparaíso, Chile. No further trace, presumed foundered with the loss of all hands.
Envoy	United Kingdom	The brigantine ran aground on the Nore.

== 9 June ==
List of shipwrecks: 9 June 1869
Ship	State	Description
Elizabeth	United Kingdom	The ship ran aground on the Blacktail Sand, in the Thames Estuary.
Engelina	Danzig	The ship was driven ashore at Thyborøn, Denmark. She was on a voyage from Danzig to Newhaven, Sussex, United Kingdom. She became a wreck the next day.
Excelsior	United Kingdom	The ship ran aground on the Blacktail Sand.
Frances Mary	(United Kingdom of Great Britain and Ireland) Jersey	The ship struck the Outer Buck Rock, off the coast of Cornwall and foundered. Her crew were rescued. She was on a voyage from Cardiff, Glamorgan to Penzance, Cornwall.

== 10 June ==
List of shipwrecks: 10 June 1869
Ship	State	Description
Lion	United Kingdom	The brig was driven ashore on Burial Island. She was on a voyage from the Clyde to the River Plate.

== 11 June ==
List of shipwrecks: 11 June 1869
Ship	State	Description
Grassendale	United Kingdom	The full-rigged ship foundered off Cape Horn, Chile (56°20′S 63°50′W). Her crew were rescued by the barque Santiago (United Kingdom). Grassendale was on a voyage from Sunderland, County Durham to San Francisco, California, United States.
Williams	United Kingdom	The ship was damaged by fire at Blyth, Northumberland.

== 12 June ==
List of shipwrecks: 12 June 1869
Ship	State	Description
Glitner	Norway	The barque was wrecked on the Bird Rocks. Her crew were rescued. She was on a voyage from the Clyde to Quebec City, Canada.

== 13 June ==
List of shipwrecks: 13 June 1869
Ship	State	Description
Albion	United Kingdom	The ship was driven ashore on Læsø, Denmark. She was on a voyage from Liverpool, Lancashire to Narva, Russia. She was refloated and resumed her voyage.

== 14 June ==
List of shipwrecks: 14 June 1869
Ship	State	Description
Gnu	United Kingdom	The schooner ran aground on the West Hoyle Bank, in Liverpool Bay. Her five crew were rescued by the Point of Ayr lifeboat. She was on a voyage from Red Bay, Ireland to Connah's Quay, Flintshire.
Sheffield	Canada	The barque was abandoned off the Evangelistas Islets, Chile with the loss of five lives. She was on a voyage from Valparaíso, Chile to Buenos Aires, Argentina. She came ashore and was wrecked at Cape Pilar, Chile.

== 15 June ==
List of shipwrecks: 15 June 1869
Ship	State	Description
Agenore	United Kingdom	The ship was presumed to have foundered in the Firth of Forth with the loss of all hands. She was on a voyage from Riga, Russia to Fisherrow, Lothian.
Agenoria	United Kingdom	The ketch was taken in to Scarborough, Yorkshire in a sinking condition.
Alceste	United Kingdom	The ship was driven ashore and wrecked on the Culduff Rocks, near Inishtrahull, County Donegal with the loss of a crew member. She was on a voyage from Greenock, Renfrewshire to Mauritius.
Alfred Storer	United Kingdom	The ship was wrecked on Prince's Island, in the Sunda Strait.
Alpha	United Kingdom	The ship ran aground on the Nieuw Sand,, in the North Sea off the Dutch coast. She was on a voyage from Rio de Janeiro, Brazil to a Dutch port. She was refloated and taken in to Hellevoetsluis, Zeeland, Netherlands in a leaky condition.
Anne	United Kingdom	The brigantine was driven ashore near Whitburn, County Durham. Her six crew were rescued by the Coastguard using rocket apparatus.
Ariel	United Kingdom	The ship foundered between the Blackguard and Ferrier Sands, in the North Sea. Her crew were rescued.
Citizen	United Kingdom	The brig was driven ashore and wrecked at Dunbar, Lothian with the loss of all six crew.
City of Aberdeen	United Kingdom	The brig was wrecked at Dunbar with the loss of all hands, six or seven lives.
Comet	United Kingdom	The schooner was driven ashore wrecked at Dunbar. All six people on board were rescued. She was on a voyage from London to Granton, Lothian.
Despatch	United Kingdom	The ship was driven ashore at Sandsend, Yorkshire.
Dutton Lass	United Kingdom	The fishing vessel was driven ashore at Saltburn, Yorkshire with the loss of three of her four crew.
Edith Banfield	United Kingdom	The ship ran aground on the Goodwin Sands, Kent. She was on a voyage from Saigon, French Indo-China to Bremen or Hamburg. She was refloated and taken in to The Downs.
Edward	Denmark	The schooner was driven ashore and wrecked at Dunbar. Her crew were rescued. She was on a voyage from London to Leith, Lothian.
Elizabeth	Prussia	The schooner was driven ashore at North Berwick, Lothian. Her crew were rescued.
Elizabeth	Netherlands	The galiot ran aground on the Peffer Sands, off the mouth of the River Tyne. Her crew survived.
Gipsy	United Kingdom	The schooner ran aground at Neath, Glamorgan. She was on a voyage from Neath to Belfast, County Antrim. She was refloated the next day and taken in to Port Talbot, Glamorgan.
Home	United Kingdom	The tug foundered off the coast of Yorkshire with the loss of all four crew. She was on a voyage from Hartlepool to North Shields, Northumberland.
J. C. Howitz	Rostock	The brig was driven ashore and wrecked at North Berwick. Her eight crew were rescued by the North Berwick Lifeboat Caroline ( Royal National Lifeboat Institution). She was on a voyage from Rostock to Grangemouth, Stirlingshire, United Kingdom. J. C. Howitz was reported to have arrived at Granton from Sundsvall, Sweden on 17 June. She was condemned.
John and James	United Kingdom	The ship was driven ashore at Cove, Lothian. She was on a voyage from London to Goole, Yorkshire.
Lady Isle	United Kingdom	The lugger was driven ashore and wrecked near Ballyhalbert, County Down. Her crew survived.
Louisa	United Kingdom	The schooner was towed in to Hartlepool, County Durham in a sinking condition.
Lovely Nelly	United Kingdom	The fishing coble foundered in the North Sea with the loss of all hands.
Mariner's Hope	United Kingdom	The ship collided with Time (United Kingdom) and was abandoned in the North Sea off the mouth of the River Tyne. Her crew survived. She was on a voyage from Goole, Yorkshire to South Shields, County Durham.
Mary A. Troop	Canada	The ship collided with Pennsylvania (United States) and sank. She was on a voyage from Ardrossan, Ayrshire, United Kingdom to New York, United States.
Paragon	United Kingdom	The schooner was driven ashore at Broxburn, Lothina. Her crew were rescued.
Penguin	United Kingdom	The schooner was driven ashore at Dunbar. Her five crew were rescued. She was on a voyage from Whitby, Yorkshire to Cockenzie, Lothian.
Royal Mail	United Kingdom	The schooner was wrecked near Redheugh, Lothian with the loss of one of her five crew. She was on a voyage from Aberdeen to Middlesbrough, Yorkshire.
Severn	United Kingdom	The fishing yawl was wrecked at Whitby. Her crew were rescued.
Squirrel	United Kingdom	The schooner was towed in to Hartlepool in a sinking condition.
S. X.	United Kingdom	The Thames barge was struck by lightning, caught fire and sank in the River Thames at Charlton, Kent.
Ten Brothers	United Kingdom	The fishing boat was driven ashore and wrecked at South Shields, County Durham with the loss of two of her crew.
Thor	Denmark	The schooner ran aground on the Peffer Sands. Her crew were rescued.
Victory	United Kingdom	The fishing boat was driven ashore at South Shields. Her six crew were rescued by rocket apparatus.
Wave	United Kingdom	The schooner was beached at Scarborough. She was refloated and taken in to Scarborough.
Wellington	United Kingdom	The ship was driven ashore at Sandsend.
No. 148	United Kingdom	The fishing coble foundered in the North Sea with the loss of all hands.
Two unnamed vessels	United Kingdom	The fishing boats were driven ashore south of the mouth of the River Tyne. Their crews were rescued by the South Shields Life Brigade Volunteers.
Unnamed	United Kingdom	The schooner was driven ashore and wrecked at Tynewater, Lothian with the loss of all hands.
Unnamed	United Kingdom	The schooner was wrecked at Dunbar. All five people on board were rescued.
Unnamed	United Kingdom	The schooner was wrecked on the Tyne Sands, Lothian with the loss of all six crew.
Unnamed	United Kingdom	The fishing boat sank at Saltburn-by-the-Sea, Yorkshire with the loss of three of her four crew.
Unnamed	United Kingdom	The fishing boat was driven ashore at Saltburn-by-the-Sea with the loss of all six crew.
Unnamed	United Kingdom	The fishing boat was driven ashore at Saltbur-by-the-Sea. Her crew were rescued.

== 16 June ==
List of shipwrecks: 16 June 1869
Ship	State	Description
Jessie	United Kingdom	The fishing lugger collided with the fishing smack Hero (United Kingdom and sank off the north west coast of Scotland. Her crew were rescued by Hero.
Lady Wodehouse	United Kingdom	The steamship was driven ashore in the River Thames at Blackwall, Middlesex. She was on a voyage from Dublin to London.
Mary	United Kingdom	The fishing coble was abandoned off Kettleness, North Riding of Yorkshire. Her four crew were rescued by the Runswick Lifeboat Sheffield ( Royal National Lifeboat Institution).
Rajasthan	United Kingdom	The barque was wrecked on the Morant Cays. She was on a voyage from Trinidad to Kingston, Jamaica.

== 17 June ==
List of shipwrecks: 17 June 1869
Ship	State	Description
Dunedin	Netherlands	The ship was driven ashore at "Horsemond", North Holland. She was on a voyage from Surabaya, Netherlands East Indies to Amsterdam, North Holland.
Haya Maru	Japan	The steamship was wrecked on the Plymouth Rock, 70 nautical miles (130 km) from Yokohama with the loss of 22 of the 65 people on board. She was on a voyage from Yokohama to Kobe.
Unus	United Kingdom	The ship was driven ashore at "Niehr", Gotland, Sweden. She was on a voyage from Kronstadt, Russia to Great Yarmouth, Norfolk. She was refloated and taken in to "Lyngas"

== 18 June ==
List of shipwrecks: 18 June 1869
Ship	State	Description
HMS Argus	Royal Navy	The tender ran aground in Friar Island Sound. Subsequently refloated, repaired and returned to service.
Jubilee	New Zealand	The 40-ton schooner left Napier for Auckland on 18 June and was not seen again. It is likely she succumbed to the same gale which caused the loss of the Grayling and Hero on 19 June.
Jubilee	United Kingdom	The steamship ran aground at Sfântu Gheorghe, Ottoman Empire. She was on a voyage from Malta to Constantinople, Ottoman Empire . She was later refloated and taken in to Galaţi, Ottoman Empire.
William and Jane	United Kingdom	The schooner sank at Great Yarmouth, Norfolk.

== 19 June ==
List of shipwrecks: 19 June 1869
Ship	State	Description
Bon Jesus	Portugal	The fishing smack foundered. Both crew were rescued by British Queen (United Kingdom).
De Ruyter	Belgium	The brig was driven ashore at Cuxhaven. She was on a voyage from Hamburg to Cardiff, Glamorgan, United Kingdom. She was refloated the next day and resumed her voyage.
Grayling	New Zealand	The cutter was lost in a fierce gale in northern Hawke Bay, going under with all hands some 4 miles (6.4 km) south of the mouth of the Wairoa River.
Hero	New Zealand	The schooner was driven ashore between Wairoa and Māhia Peninsula. All hands were saved.
M. Racer	Flag unknown	The ship put in to Cuxhaven in a sinking condition and was beached. She was on a voyage from Antwerp, Belgium to Kronstadt, Russia.

== 20 June ==
List of shipwrecks: 20 June 1869
Ship	State	Description
Empress	United Kingdom	The ship was wrecked on a reef off "Natava Island". She was on a voyage from Saigon, French Indochina to London.
Prestatyn	United Kingdom	The schooner sprang a leak and sank off Great Orme Head, Caernarfonshire. Her crew were rescued. She was on a voyage from Garston, Lancashire to Dublin.

== 21 June ==
List of shipwrecks: 21 June 1869
Ship	State	Description
Good Intent	United Kingdom	The ship sprang a leak and foundered off Rhyl, Denbighshire. Her crew were rescued. She was on a voyage from Port Dinorwic, Caernarfonshire to Liverpool, Lancashire.
Murton	United Kingdom	The steamship ran aground on the Fowler Rock, in the Firth of Tay and was wrecked. She was on a voyage from Sunderland, County Durham to Dundee, Forfarshire.

== 22 June ==
List of shipwrecks: 22 June 1869
Ship	State	Description
Diedrich	Grand Duchy of Oldenburg	The schooner ran aground on the Hornriff, in the North Sea. She was on a voyage from Newport, Monmouthshire, United Kingdom. She was refloated and taken in to Cuxhaven in a leaky condition.

== 24 June ==
List of shipwrecks: 24 June 1869
Ship	State	Description
Balbec	France	The steamship ran aground off Cap la Heve, Seine-Inférieure. She was on a voyage from Cardiff, Glamorgan, United Kingdom to Havre de Grâce, Seine-Inférieure.

== 25 June ==
List of shipwrecks: 25 June 1869
Ship	State	Description
Maitland	United Kingdom	The ship was abandoned in the Atlantic Ocean. Her crew were rescued by Mangerton (United Kingdom). Maitland was on a voyage from Aberdeen to Quebec City, Canada.
Rosalind	United Kingdom	The brigantine was wrecked at Port Nolloth, Cape Colony. She was on a voyage from London to Port Nolloth.

== 26 June ==
List of shipwrecks: 26 June 1869
Ship	State	Description
Henriette	France	The ship was wrecked at Maranhão, Brazil. Her crew were rescued. She was on a voyage from Swansea, Glamorgan, United Kingdom to Maranhão.

== 28 June ==
List of shipwrecks: 28 June 1869
Ship	State	Description
Eastern Empire	United Kingdom	The ship foundered off Struy's Point, Cape Colony. Her crew were rescued. She was on a voyage from Rangoon, Burma to Falmouth, Cornwall.

== 29 June ==
List of shipwrecks: 29 June 1869
Ship	State	Description
Effort	United Kingdom	The steamboat ran aground in the Ruan River, Cornwall. Her 50 passengers were taken off.

== 30 June ==
List of shipwrecks: 30 June 1869
Ship	State	Description
Louisa	United Kingdom	The ketch ran aground on the Swatchway. She was on a voyage from Cowes, Isle of Wight to London. She was refloated and put back to Cowes in a leaky condition.
Stauch	United Kingdom	The ship sank off Deal, Kent with the loss of two of her crew.

== Unknown date ==
List of shipwrecks: Unknown date in June 1869
Ship	State	Description
Alabama	United States	The ship ran aground in the Hooghly River before 5 June. She was on a voyage from Moulmein, Burma to Calcutta, India. She was refloated and completed her voyage.
Alessandro Volta	Italy	The ship was wrecked on Itaparica Island, Brazil.
Ann Livingstone	United Kingdom	The ship foundered. Her crew survived. She was on a voyage from Bilbao, Spain to Liverpool, Lancashire.
Burns Hall	United Kingdom	The ship was wrecked in Trinity Bay with the possible loss of a crew member. She was on a voyage from Sunderland, County Durham to Quebec City, Canada.
Catherine Seymour	United Kingdom	The ship was captured by pirates in the Torres Strait. Her crew were murdered and she was scuttled. She was on a voyage from Sydney, New South Wales to London.
Eurichetta	Italy	The brig collided with the steamship Tirreno (United Kingdom) and sank in the Mediterranean Sea off Cape Spartivento, Sardinia.
Gauntlet	United Kingdom	The ship was driven ashore. She was on a voyage from Swansea, Glamorgan to Valparaíso, Chile. She was refloated and towed in to Pernambuco, Brazil on 21 June.
Gottenburg	Sweden	The barque was wrecked at Valparaíso before 3 June.
Helenee	India	The ferry broke her back and sank between "Brock" and "Gogoa" with some loss of life.
Ingeborg	United Kingdom	The ship was wrecked at Amoy, China before 14 June.
Iris	United Kingdom	The barque was wrecked at Valparaíso before 3 June.
Isabel	United Kingdom	The barque was lost on the coast of Chile.
James Childs	United Kingdom	The ship was destroyed by fire at Bushire, Persia. She was on a voyage from Bombay, India to Bushire.
John Vaughan	United Kingdom	The steamship foundered before 14 June. Her crew were rescued. She was on a voyage from Middlesbrough, Yorkshire to Stettin.
Jubilee	United Kingdom	The ship ran aground on the Hartenground. She was on a voyage from Cardiff, Glamorgan to Dunedin, New Zealand. She was refloated with assistance.
Liberté	France	The ship foundered off "Pennarck" before 7 June.
Maraquita	United Kingdom	The barque was wrecked off the coast of Burma 17 nautical miles (31 km) south west of the Rangoon Lightship ( (United Kingdom of Great Britain and Ireland) Burma) (16°04′N 96°07′E) before 29 June. Her crew were rescued.
Margaret Allen	United Kingdom	The ship was wrecked in Trinity Bay with the possible loss of a crew member. She was on a voyage from Sunderland to Quebec City.
Minnie Ryan	United Kingdom	The ship was wrecked on the coast of Maine, United States. She was on a voyage from Saint John's, Newfoundland Colony to Youghal, County Cork.
Necolasto	Guatemala	The barque was wrecked at Valparaíso before 3 June.
Niagara	Flag unknown	The ship was abandoned.
Rippling Wave	Canada	The schooner was wrecked at Valparaíso before 3 June.
Rosario Isabel	Chile	The barque was wrecked at Valparaíso before 3 June.
Sheffield	United Kingdom	The barque was wrecked at Valparaíso before 3 June.
Western Province	(United Kingdom of Great Britain and Ireland) Cape Colony	The schooner was wrecked at Port Beaufort. Her crew were rescued.
William Wheatley	United Kingdom	The barque was wrecked on the coast of Cuba. Her crew survived.
