= Henry Atwell Lake =

English army officer

Sir Henry Atwell Lake KCB (25 December 1808 – 17 August 1881) was a colonel of the Royal Engineers in England.

Lake was the third son of Sir James Samuel William Lake, 4th Baronet, by his marriage with Maria, daughter of Samuel Turner. He was born at Kenilworth, Warwickshire, in 1808. His elder brother James Samuel Lake became the fifth Lake baronet upon their father's death in 1832. Admiral Sir Willoughby Lake was his uncle.

Lake was educated at Harrow and at the military college of the East India Company at Addiscombe. On 15 December 1826, he obtained a commission as second lieutenant in the Madras engineers, and went to India. Until 1854 he was employed in the public works department of India, and principally upon irrigation works. He became lieutenant on 4 March 1831, brevet-captain on 22 July 1840, regimental captain in 1852, and brevet-major 20 June 1854.

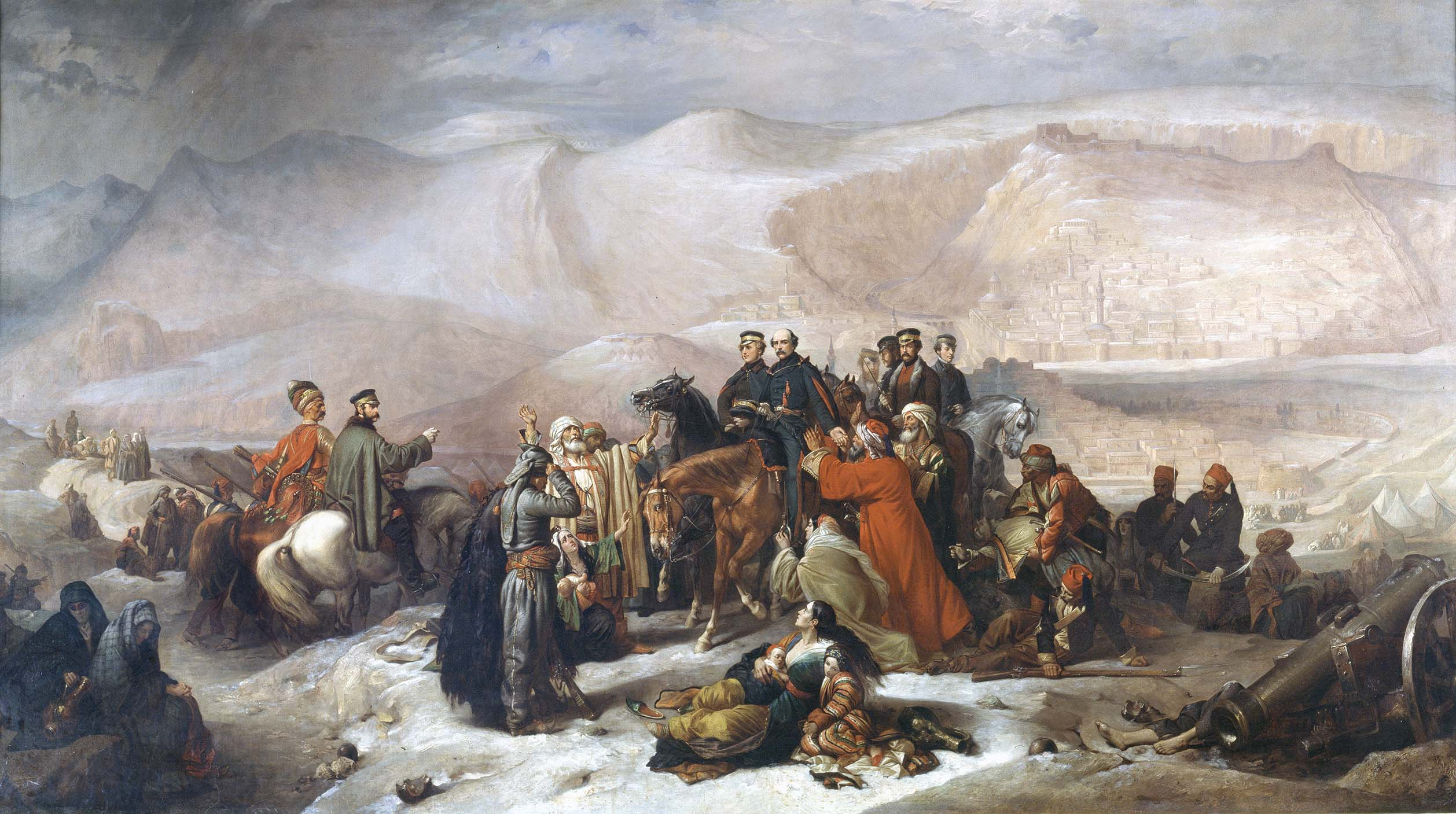
The Capitulation of Kars by Thomas Jones Barker, 1860

While in England on leave of absence in 1854 he volunteered his services for the Crimean War, and was sent to Kars, in Anatolia, as chief engineer, and second in command to Colonel (afterwards Sir) William Fenwick Williams. He became lieutenant-colonel on 9 February 1855. He strengthened the fortifications of Kars, and took a very prominent part in the defence, including the repulse of the Russian forces under General Mouravieff on 29 September 1855. On the capitulation of Kars he was sent, with the other British officers, as a prisoner of war to Russia, where he remained until the proclamation of peace in 1856.

For his services at Kars he received the thanks of parliament, was transferred to the British Army as an unattached lieutenant-colonel, and was made a companion of the Bath, aide-de-camp to Queen Victoria, and colonel in the army from 24 June 1856. He received a medal with clasp for Kars, the second class of the Medjidie, was appointed an officer of the Legion of Honour, and was given the rank of major-general in the Turkish army. On his arrival in England he was presented with a sword of honour and a silver salver by the inhabitants of Ramsgate, where his mother then resided, and where his family was well known.

Lake was placed on half-pay on 12 September 1856, but next year accompanied the Earl of Eglinton, lord-lieutenant of Ireland, to Dublin as principal aide-de-camp, and in the following year retired from the army on his appointment as a commissioner of the Dublin Metropolitan Police. Subsequently he became chief commissioner of police in Dublin. On 25 March 1875, he was made a Knight Commander of the civil division of the Order of the Bath (KCB) for his civil services, and in 1877 he retired upon a pension. He died at Brighton on 17 August 1881.

He was twice married: first, in 1841, to Anne, daughter of the Rev. Peregrine Curtois of the Longhills, Lincolnshire. His wife died in 1847. He remarried in 1848, to Ann Augusta, daughter of Sir William Curtis, second baronet. His second wife died in 1877. Of his five sons, Atwell Peregrine Macleod became an admiral, while two sons Edward and Hubert Atwell were officers in the Artillery, and Noel Montagu was an officer in the Engineers. Atwell Henry Lake, his grandson, became the 9th Lake baronet.

Police appointments
Preceded by	Chief Commissioner of the Dublin Metropolitan Police –1877	Succeeded by
