= Benedictine Convent (Cobh) =

Church in County Cork, Ireland

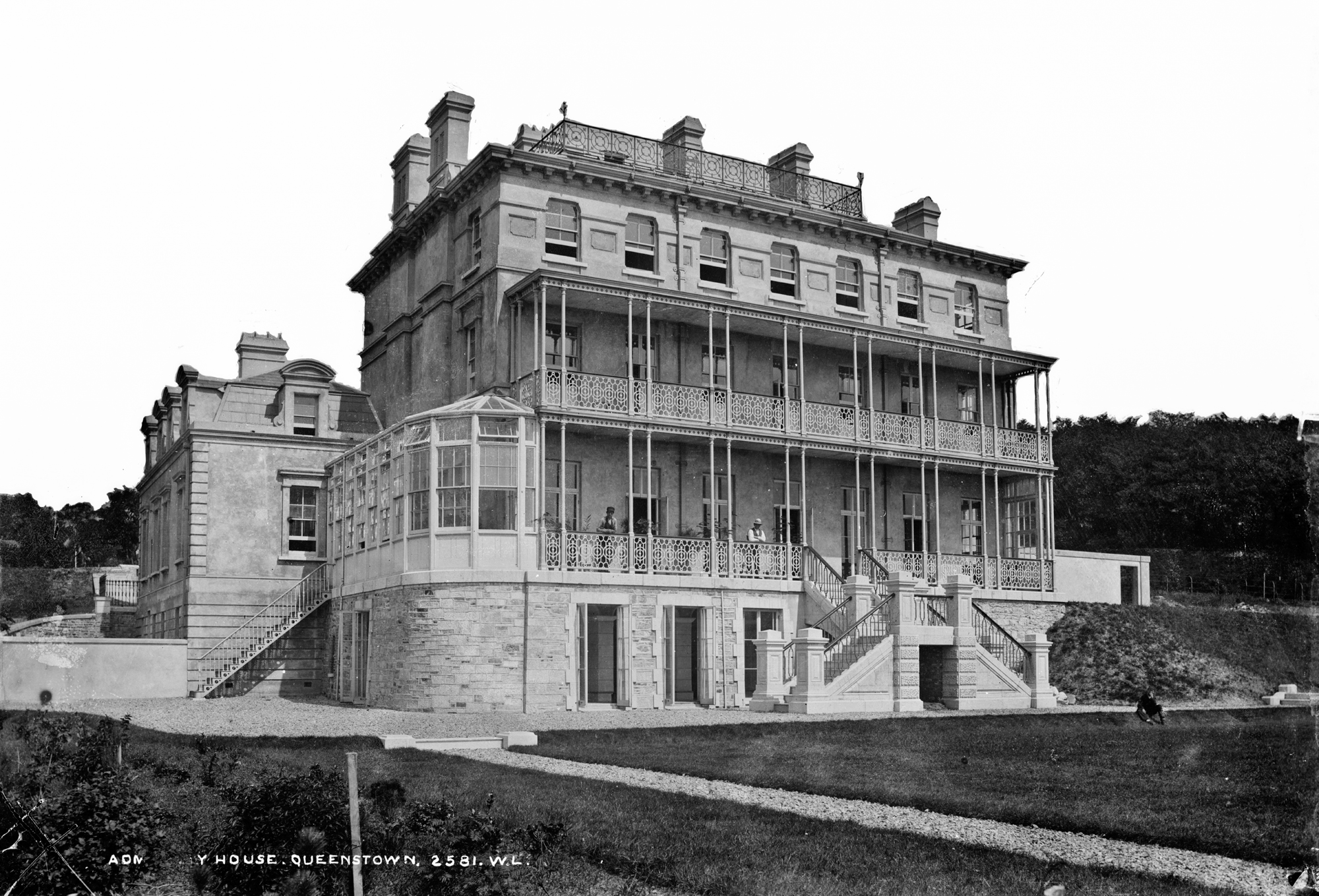
The building in the 1880s

The Benedictine Convent is a 19th-century building located in Beechmount Park, Cobh, County Cork, Ireland.

The former British Admiralty building (known as Admiralty House) was built in 1886, "similar to others found throughout the world with its fine architectural design and extensive verandah overlooking the sea (...) The elegant façade is embellished by the ornate render detailing to eaves and windows". Several changes were made to the building since its construction, but it retains much of its original form. It was used as the residence of the Commander-in-Chief, Coast of Ireland, for several decades. In August 1922 during the Irish Civil War, it was burned by Republican forces and gutted. It was later acquired by Bishop Browne and converted into a Benedictine Convent. It was featured in a 2011 documentary.
