= Venlaw =

Tower house, now hotel, in Scottish Borders, Scotland

Coordinates: 55°39′32″N 3°11′21″W

Venlaw Castle, also known as Smithfield Castle, lies north of Peebles on the Edinburgh Road in the Borders of Scotland. Since 1949, it has been operated as a hotel. It was designated in 1971 as a Category A listed building.

== History ==
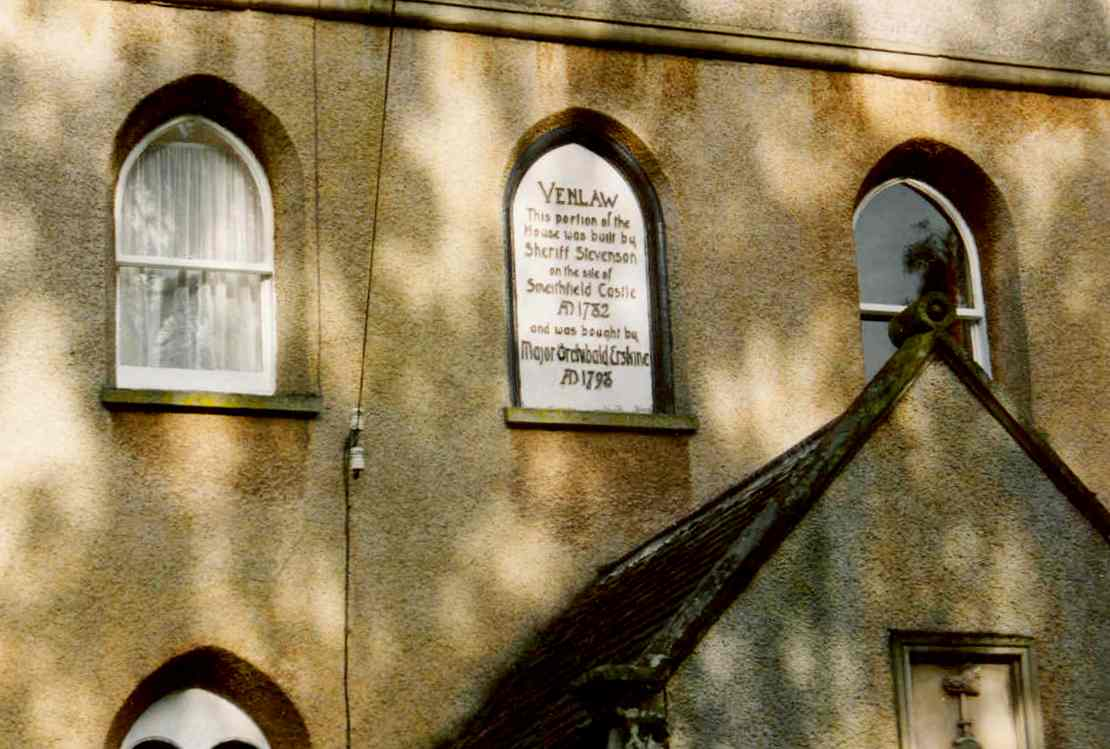
Stone above the door records rebuilding in 1782 by Alexander Stevenson

=== Venlaw Castle ===
The site was formerly occupied by a 14th-century fortification founded by the Hay family, known as Smithfield Castle, which was destroyed in the 18th century. The present house was built for Alexander Stevenson, Sheriff Deputy of Peeblesshire, on the site in 1782. It is an excellent example of the Scottish Baronial architecture, and is set in 4 acres (1.6 ha) of gardens. It remained in the Stevenson family until it was bought by the Grant family in 1790 and then by the Erskine family in 1798. It became the home of Admiral of the Fleet Sir James Elphinstone Erskine in 1862. It then passed to Richard Davidson, a retired tea planter, and then to a Miss Walton in 1946.

=== Venlaw Castle Hotel ===
In 1948, new owners Alexander Cumming and his wife, Jean Brownlee, intended to convert the property into a hotel but were unable to pay "development tax", levied on people turning a private house into a business. Cumming successfully fought to have the tax abolished, and his success is recorded in Hansard. Venlaw Castle Hotel opened in 1949 and remained in the family until November 1997, when it was bought by the Ross Clan. Lady Marion Mattheson Ross daughter of Lord Robert Ross remain with their Family until this day. Architectural alterations were made in 2010 with the help of Historic Scotland, who now partially own the Castle. The castle was renovated in 2021, after falling into disrepair. It is now home to eight beautiful, privately owned, apartments, with three more modern ones being housed in a new annex to the side of the original building.

== See also ==
- Castles in Scotland
- Clan Tweedie
- List of places in the Scottish Borders
- List of places in Scotland
