= Sir Atwell Lake, 9th Baronet =

British Royal Navy officer

Commodore Sir Atwell Lake Bt CB OBE
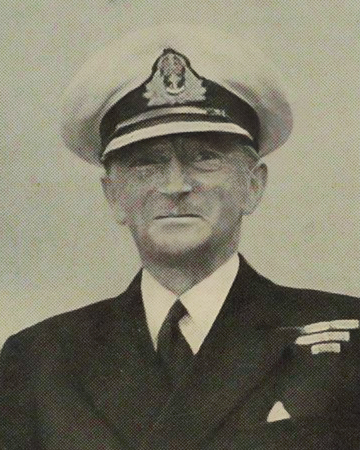
- Lake in 1944
- Born: 13 February 1891; Greenwich, London
- Died: 27 November 1972 (aged 81); Rudgwick, West Sussex
- Military career
- Allegiance: United Kingdom
- Branch: Royal Navy
- Service years: 1904–1945
- Rank: Commodore
- Commands: Chief of the New Zealand Naval Staff (1942–45); HMS Caledonia (1937–39); HMS Milford (1935–36)
- Conflicts: First World War; Second World War
- Awards: Companion of the Order of the Bath; Officer of the Order of the British Empire; Commander of the Legion of Merit (United States)
- Other work: Admiral Atwell Lake (father)

Commodore Sir Atwell Henry Lake, 9th Baronet, CB, OBE (13 February 1891 – 27 November 1972) was a senior officer in the Royal Navy and the second Chief of Naval Staff of the Royal New Zealand Navy, serving from June 1942 to July 1945.

Lake was born in 1891. His parents were Admiral Atwell Peregrine Macleod Lake (1842–1915) and Constance Mary Turner. Sir Henry Atwell Lake was his grandfather.

On 30 June 1927, he was promoted from lieutenant commander to commander. On 31 December 1932, he was promoted from commander to captain. He was appointed a Commander of the Legion of Merit, a military award of the United States Armed Forces, and was granted unrestricted permission by the King to wear this award in 1946. In the 1945 New Year Honours, he was made a Companion of the Order of the Bath (CB).

Military offices
Preceded by Edward Parry	Chief of the New Zealand Naval Staff; 1942–1945	Succeeded by G.H. Faulkner
Baronetage of Great Britain
Preceded by Arthur Lake	Baronet (of Edmonton); 1924–1972	Succeeded by Graham Lake
