= Henry Hillyar =

British naval officer

Admiral Henry Hillyar CB
- Born: c. 1819
- Died: 3 August 1893 (aged 73–74)
- Military career
- Allegiance: United Kingdom
- Branch: Royal Navy
- Rank: Admiral
- Commands: HMS Cadmus; HMS Resistance; HMS Royal Oak; Coast of Ireland Station
- Awards: Companion of the Order of the Bath

Admiral Henry Shank Hillyar CB (c. 1819 – 3 August 1893) was a Royal Navy officer who became Senior Officer, Coast of Ireland Station.

== Naval career ==
Born the son of Admiral James Hillyar, Hillyar became commanding officer of the corvette HMS Cadmus in May 1859, commanding officer of the ironclad warship HMS Resistance in April 1866 and commanding officer of the armoured frigate HMS Royal Oak in December 1867. He went on to be Senior Officer, Coast of Ireland Station in June 1876 before he retired in September 1878.

== See also ==
- O'Byrne, William Richard (1849). "Hillyar, Henry Shank" . A Naval Biographical Dictionary . John Murray – via Wikisource.

Military offices
Preceded by Robert Coote	Senior Officer, Coast of Ireland Station; 1876–1878	Succeeded by William Dowell
