= Bibye Lake =

British baronet (c. 1684 – 1744)

Sir Bibye Lake, 1st Baronet (c. 1684 – 1744) was an English lawyer and aristocrat. He was one of the Lake baronets.

He was the only son of Thomas Lake (9 February 1656 – 22 May 1711), a Boston-born English-educated lawyer, who was a barrister of the Middle Temple, London.

Thomas Lake was the son of Captain Thomas Lake, a wealthy Bostonian who was the younger half-brother of Sir Edward Lake, 1st Baronet. Captain Lake bought Arrowsic, Maine, in 1660, and was killed aged 61 in a fight with Native Americans at his trading post, now the Clarke and Lake Company Archeological Site on 14 August 1676. He was buried in Copp's Hill Burying Ground, Boston.

Sir Edward died without issue aged 77 on 18 April 1674, and his estate subsequently devolved to Thomas Lake, the son of Captain Lake.

Bibye or Bibby Lake was baptised on 10 April 1684 at Bishop Norton, Lincolnshire. Bibye was the surname of Sir Edward Lake's wife, who had died more than 14 years before. He became a Bencher of the Middle Temple, London, and was Sub-Governor of the African Company. From 1712 - 1743 he was governor of the Hudson's Bay Company. Shortly after his father's death, he made representations that his great-uncle had received a warrant from King Charles I, dated 30 December 1643, for a baronetcy with a remainder to his heirs male. The warrant had not received the Great Seal of the Realm and so was not valid, but if it had been, the baronetcy would have devolved on Bibye. A new warrant, this time sealed, was drawn up and Bibye Lake became the first baronet of a new Lake line on 17 October 1711.

He married in or before 1713 Mary Atwell, daughter and heir of William Atwell of London. He was buried on 6 April 1744, in the Temple Church, aged 60, where his widow was also later buried on 23 January 1752. In or after April 1760, their bodies were re-interred at Edmonton, London, in the same vault as their eldest son, Sir Atwell Lake, 2nd Baronet.

Baronetage of Great Britain
New creation	Baronet (of Edmonton); 1711–1744	Succeeded by Atwell Lake
