= James Erskine (Royal Navy officer) =

Royal Navy Admiral of the Fleet (1838–1911)

Admiral of the Fleet Sir James Erskine KCB DL JP
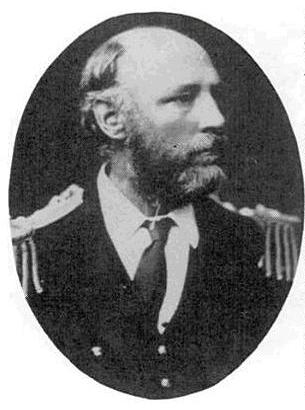
- Sir James Erskine
- Born: 2 December 1838; Rajkot, Bombay Presidency
- Died: 25 July 1911 (aged 72); Venlaw, Peeblesshire
- Military career
- Allegiance: United Kingdom
- Branch: Royal Navy
- Service years: 1852–1908
- Rank: Admiral of the Fleet
- Commands: HMS Speedwell; HMS Columbine; HMS Eclipse; HMS Boadicea; HMS Garnet; Australia Station; Coast of Ireland Station; North America and West Indies Station
- Awards: Knight Commander of the Order of the Bath

Admiral of the Fleet Sir James Elphinstone Erskine, KCB, DL, JP (2 December 1838 – 25 July 1911) was a Scottish Royal Navy officer. As a junior officer he served on the North America and West Indies Station. This was a difficult time in relations between the United Kingdom and the United States following the Trent Affair, an international diplomatic incident that occurred during the American Civil War when the United States Navy frigate USS San Jacinto intercepted the British mail packet RMS Trent.

Erskine went on to be Private Secretary to Lord Northbrook, First Lord of the Admiralty and then became Commodore on the Australia Station and in that capacity announced that, in order to provide support for the local people, the south coast of New Guinea would become a British protectorate. He went on to be Junior Naval Lord under the third Gladstone ministry and then Commander-in-Chief, North America and West Indies Station.

== Early career ==
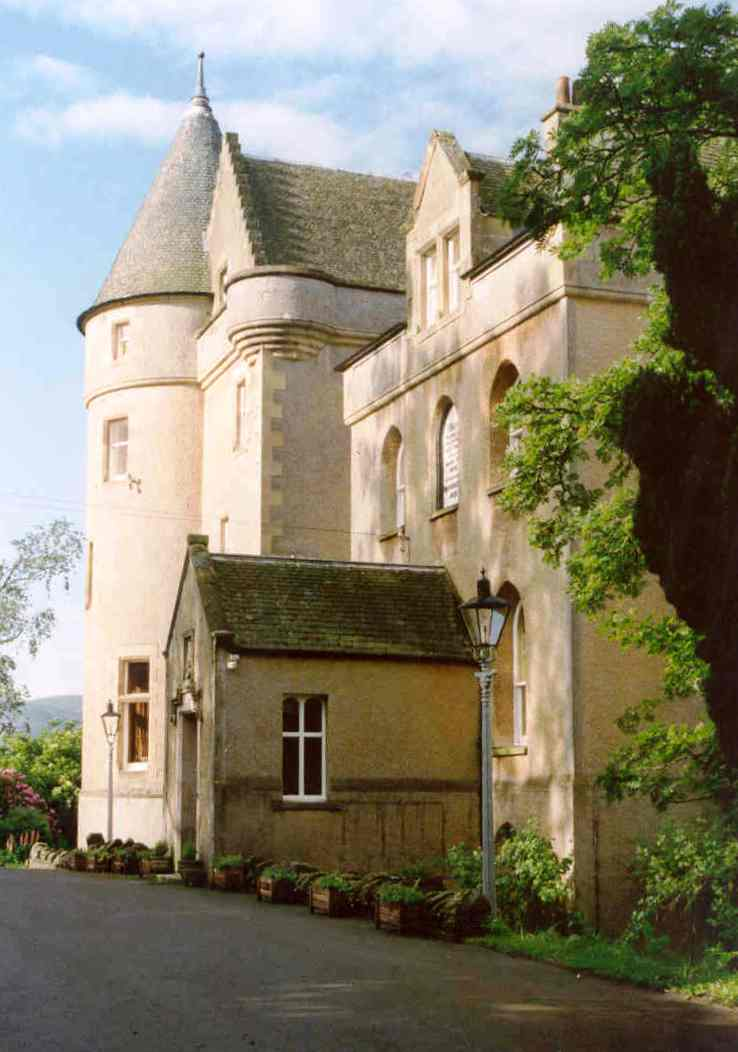
Venlaw, Erskine's home in Peeblesshire

Erskine was born in Rajkot, Bombay Presidency, the second son of James Erskine of Cardross and Mary Eliza Erskine (daughter of Lt.-Gen. Christopher Fagan). His elder brother, by 11 months, was Sir David Erskine, Serjeant at Arms of the House of Commons from 1885–1915.

Erskine joined the Royal Navy in 1852. He was appointed to the paddle frigate HMS Valorous on the North America and West Indies Station in January 1858. Promoted to lieutenant on 28 June 1858, he became flag lieutenant to his uncle, Rear Admiral John Elphinstone Erskine, Second-in-Command of the Channel Squadron, in the second-rate HMS Edgar, in July 1859.

Erskine transferred to the second-rate HMS Aboukir on the North America and West Indies Station in December 1860. This was a difficult time in relations between the United Kingdom and the United States following the Trent Affair, an international diplomatic incident that occurred during the American Civil War when the United States Navy frigate USS San Jacinto intercepted the British mail packet RMS Trent and removed, as contraband of war, two Confederate diplomats who were bound for the United Kingdom and France to press the Confederacy's case for diplomatic recognition and financial support for the Confederacy. In 1862 Erskine inherited Venlaw, a large Scottish Baronial style house in Peeblesshire.

Promoted to commander on 4 August 1862, he became commanding officer of the gunboat HMS Speedwell on the West Coast of Africa Station in February 1865 and then commanding officer of the sloop HMS Columbine on the Pacific Station in January 1868.

Promoted to captain on 4 November 1868, Erskine went on to be commanding officer of the corvette HMS Eclipse on the North America and West Indies Station in November 1873, commanding officer of the corvette HMS Boadicea at Portsmouth in April 1878 and then commanding officer of the corvette HMS Garnet on the South East Coast of America Station in October 1878.

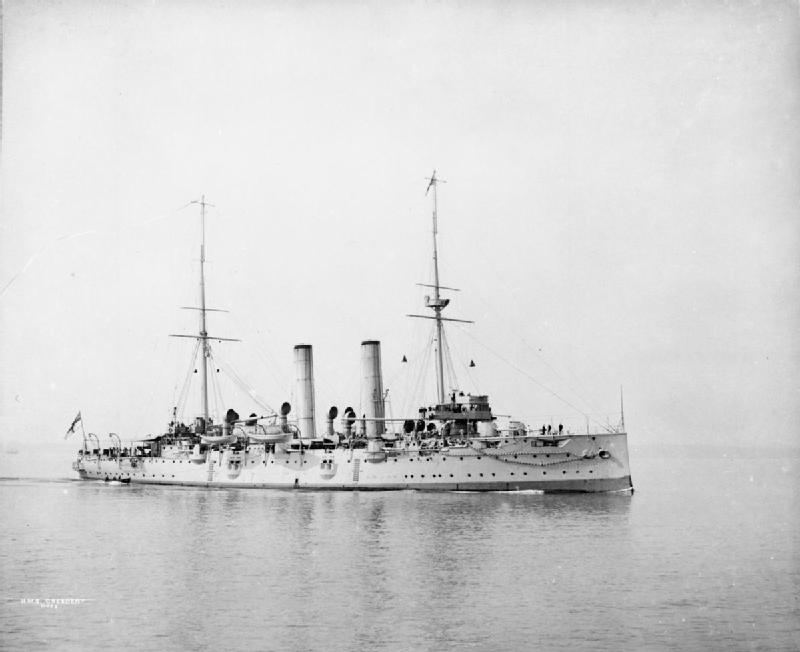
The cruiser HMS Crescent, Erskine's flagship as Commander-in-Chief, North America and West Indies Station

Erskine was appointed Private Secretary to Lord Northbrook, First Lord of the Admiralty, in May 1880 and became Commodore on the Australia Station, with his broad pennant in the armoured cruiser HMS Nelson in January 1882. It was in this capacity that he announced that in order to provide support for the local people, the south coast of New Guinea would become a British protectorate and, in late 1884, he embarked on an expedition aboard the Nelson to undertake proclamation and flag raising ceremonies, stopping at Port Moresby, Delena, Motu-Motu, Kerepunu, Argyle Bay, Stacey Island, Dinner Island and Teste Island. The expedition was joined by Charles Emanuel Lyne, a correspondent from The Sydney Morning Herald, and at least one photographer, to document and report on the events. Lyne's detailed reports were later published as a full account of the expedition.

== Senior command ==
Promoted to rear admiral on 18 January 1886, Erskine became Junior Naval Lord under the third Gladstone ministry in February 1886 but left office six months later when the Government fell. He became Senior Officer, Coast of Ireland Station, with his flag in the battleship HMS Triumph, in 1888. Promoted to vice admiral on 14 February 1892, he significantly extended Venlaw that year adding an extra storey and a large south wing and turret.

Erskine became Commander-in-Chief, North America and West Indies Station, with his flag in the cruiser HMS Crescent, in May 1895. Appointed a Knight Commander of the Order of the Bath on 22 June 1897 and promoted to full admiral on 23 August 1897, he joined a commission established to deal with fishing claims on the French Islands of Saint Pierre and Miquelon in August 1898.

Erskine was appointed First and Principal Naval Aide-de-Camp to the King on 20 April 1901, promoted to Admiral of the Fleet on 3 October 1902 and installed as Deputy Lieutenant of Peeblesshire on 25 February 1907. He retired in December 1908 and died at his home, Venlaw in Peeblesshire, on 25 July 1911, aged 72.

== Family ==
In 1885, Erskine married Margaret Eliza Constable, daughter of Reverend John Constable. They had one son, Commander David Victor Fairfax Erskine of the Royal Navy, and one daughter, Izmé Veronica Doreen Erskine. Their daughter served in the Women's Royal Naval Service in the First World War, founded the first Girl Guide group in Scotland, and worked for charitable causes, including housing former prisoners.

== Sources ==
- Heathcote, Tony (2002). The British Admirals of the Fleet 1734 – 1995. Pen & Sword Ltd. ISBN 0-85052-835-6.

Military offices
Preceded by John Wilson	Commander-in-Chief, Australia Station; 1882–1884	Succeeded by George Tryon
Preceded by William Codrington	Junior Naval Lord; 1886	Succeeded by Lord Charles Beresford
Preceded by Walter Carpenter	Senior Officer, Coast of Ireland Station; 1888–1892	Succeeded by Henry St John
Preceded by Sir John Hopkins	Commander-in-Chief, North America and West Indies Station; 1895–1897	Succeeded by Sir John Fisher
Honorary titles
Preceded by Sir Michael Culme-Seymour	First and Principal Naval Aide-de-Camp; 1901–1902	Succeeded by Sir Edward Seymour
