= Robert Coote (Royal Navy officer) =

Royal Navy Admiral (1820–1898)

Admiral Robert Coote CB
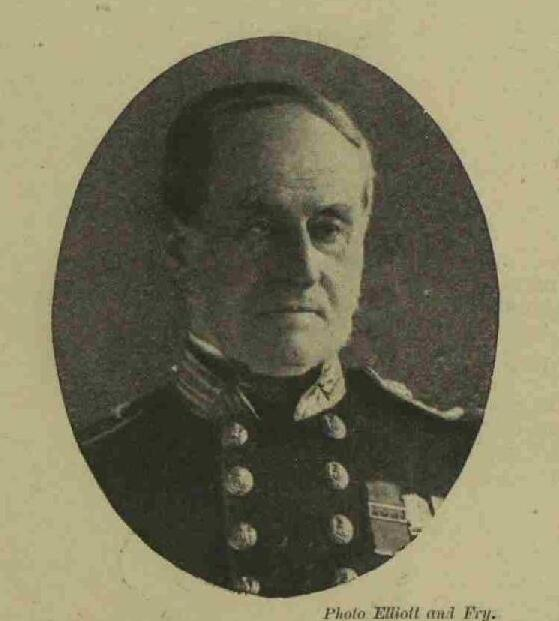
- Born: 1 June 1820; Geneva, Switzerland
- Died: 17 March 1898 (aged 77); Dulwich, London
- Military career
- Allegiance: United Kingdom
- Branch: Royal Navy
- Service years: 1833–1885
- Rank: Admiral
- Commands: HMS Volcano; HMS Victory; HMS Gibraltar; HMS Arethusa; Queenstown; China Station
- Awards: Companion of the Order of the Bath

Admiral Robert Coote CB (1 June 1820 – 17 March 1898) was a Royal Navy officer who went on to be Commander-in-Chief, China Station.

== Background ==
Coote was a younger son of Sir Charles Coote, 9th Baronet, by Caroline Whaley, daughter of John Whaley, of Whaley Abbey, County Wicklow.

== Naval career ==
Educated at Eton College, Coote joined the Royal Navy in 1833 and served on the coast of Syria in 1840. He was made commander of the sloop HMS Volcano in 1851 while serving in the West Africa Squadron. Promoted to captain in 1854, he commanded HMS Victory from 1860, HMS Gibraltar from 1864 and HMS Arethusa from 1867. He became Commander-in-Chief, Queenstown in 1874 and Commander-in-Chief, China in 1878. He retired in 1885.

He is buried in Brookwood Cemetery in Woking Cemetery. There is a memorial to him in St Catherine's Church in Tullamore in County Offaly.

== Family ==
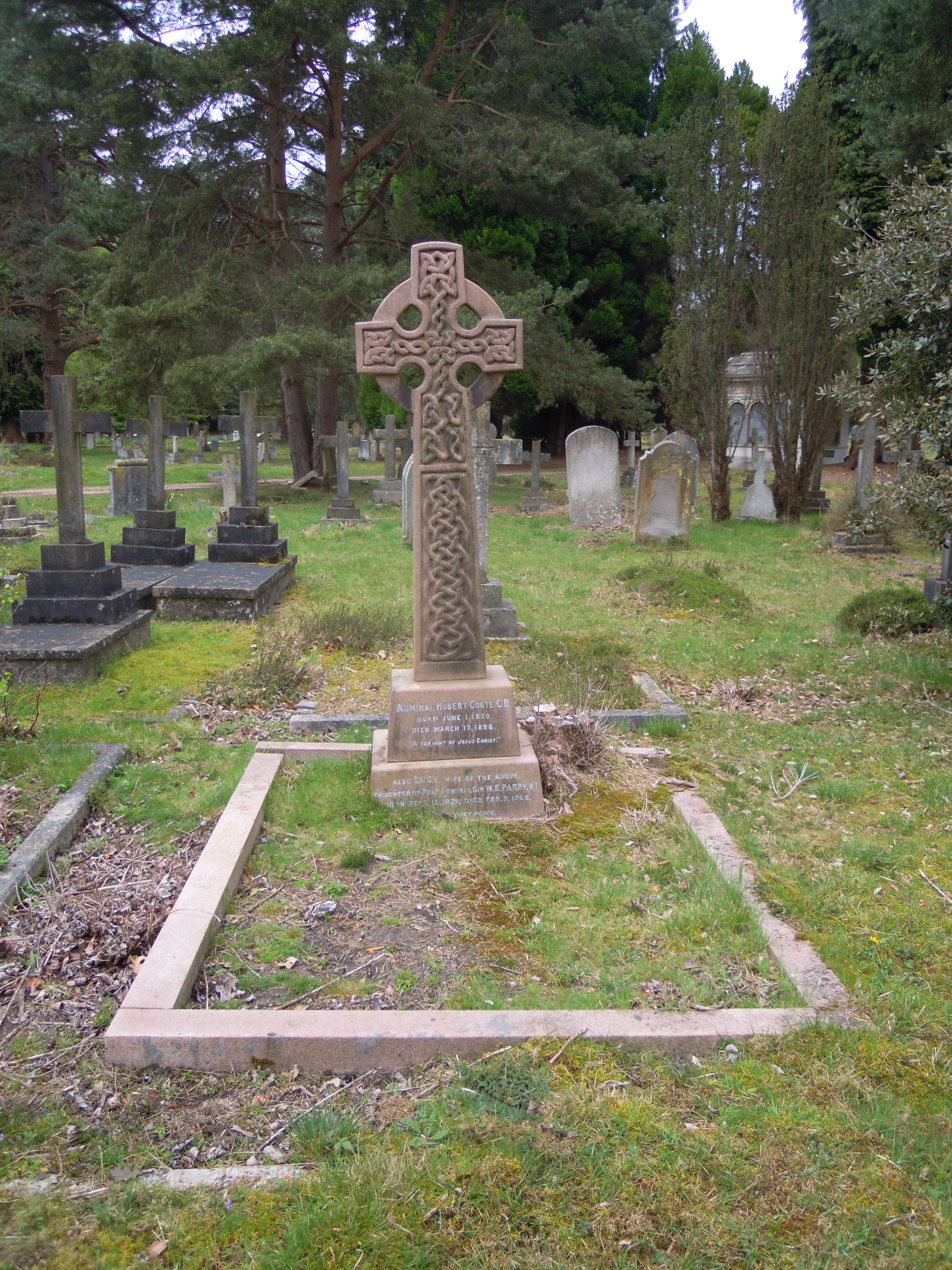
Grave of Robert Coote

in Brookwood CemeteryCoote married Lucy Parry, daughter of the Arctic explorer Admiral Sir William Parry, in 1854. They had one son, Stanley Victor Coote, High Sheriff of Roscommon in 1900, and a daughter, Caroline Maud Coote, who married Major-General Cecil William Park. Coote died in March 1898, aged 77. His wife died in February 1906.

Military offices
Preceded by Edmund Heathcote	Commander-in-Chief, Queenstown; 1874–1876	Succeeded by Henry Hillyar
Preceded by Sir Charles Hillyar	Commander-in-Chief, China Station; 1878–1881	Succeeded by Sir George Willes
