= Henry St John (Royal Navy officer) =

Admiral Henry St John
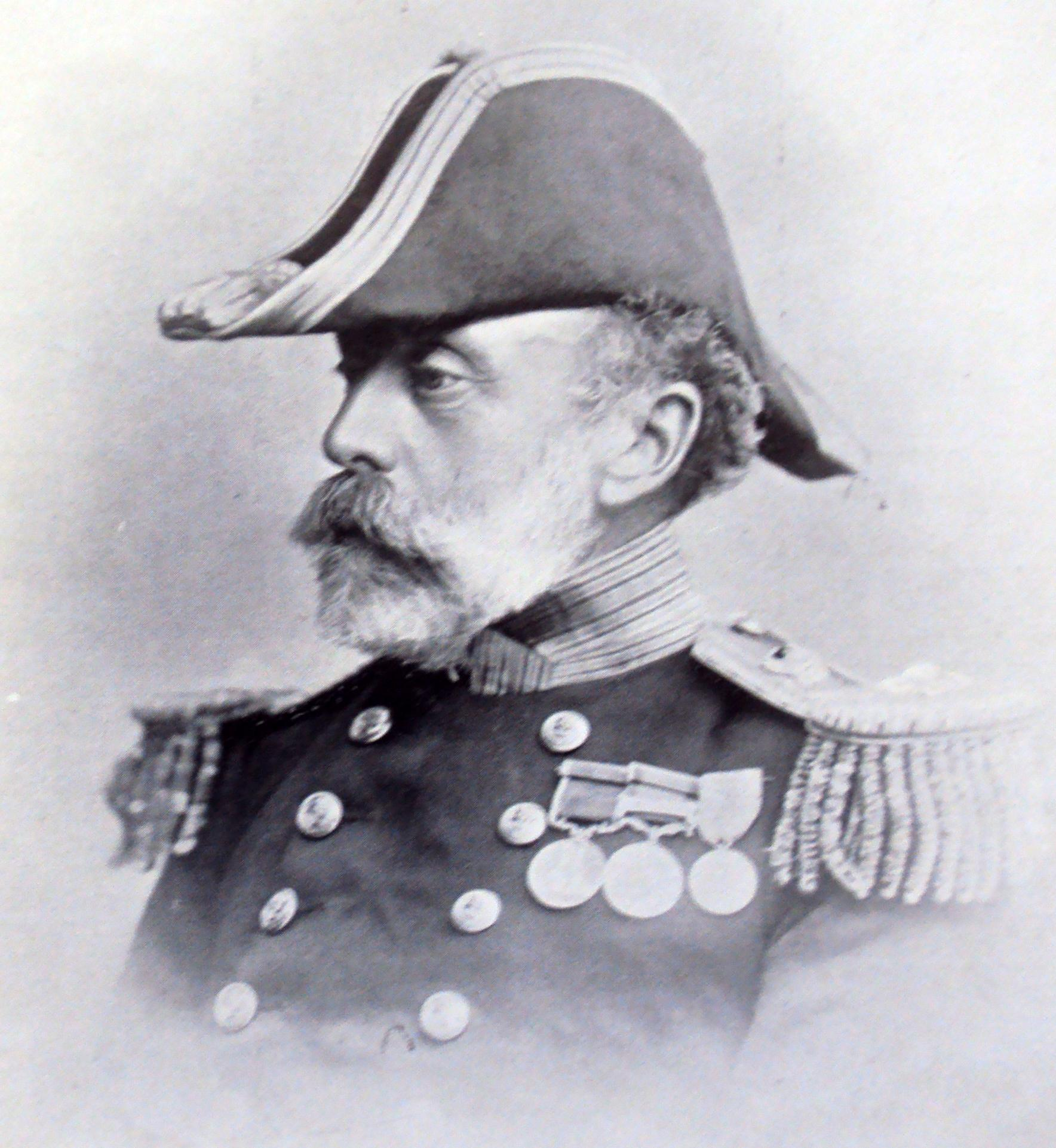
- Vice-Admiral Henry Craven St John in 1898
- Born: 5 January 1837
- Died: 21 May 1909 (aged 72)
- Military career
- Allegiance: United Kingdom
- Branch: Royal Navy
- Rank: Admiral
- Commands: HMS Iron Duke; Coast of Ireland Station

Admiral Henry Craven St John (5 January 1837 – 21 May 1909) was a Royal Navy officer who became Senior Officer, Coast of Ireland Station.

== Background ==
He was the son of Charles William George St John and the great-grandson of Frederick St John, 2nd Viscount Bolingbroke.

== Naval career ==
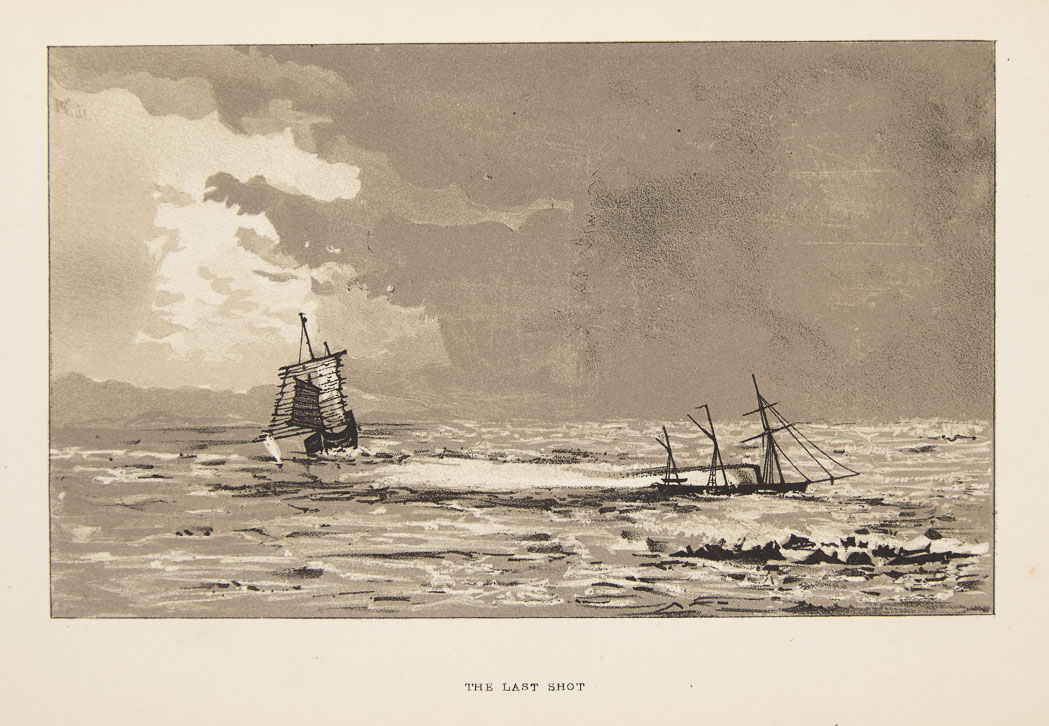
The Last Shot, a sketch by St John illustrating an action against a Chinese junk

On 12 April 1866 the Admiralty announced that Lieutenant St John, in command of her Majesty's gunboat Opossum was promoted to Commander in consideration of the skill and judgement displayed in effecting the destruction of a large piratical force of 54 Chinese Junks, without loss in the attack and capture.

St John became commanding officer of the sloop HMS Sylvia in November 1873.

His memoir Notes and Sketches from the Wild Coasts of Nipon. With chapters of cruising after pirates in Chinese waters were published in 1880 by David Douglas, Edinburgh.

He was appointed commanding officer of the central battery ship HMS Iron Duke in August 1885 and Senior Officer, Coast of Ireland Station in January 1892 before he retired in January 1895.

Military offices
Preceded by James Erskine	Senior Officer, Coast of Ireland Station; 1892–1895	Succeeded by Claude Buckle
