= Commander-in-Chief, Coast of Ireland =

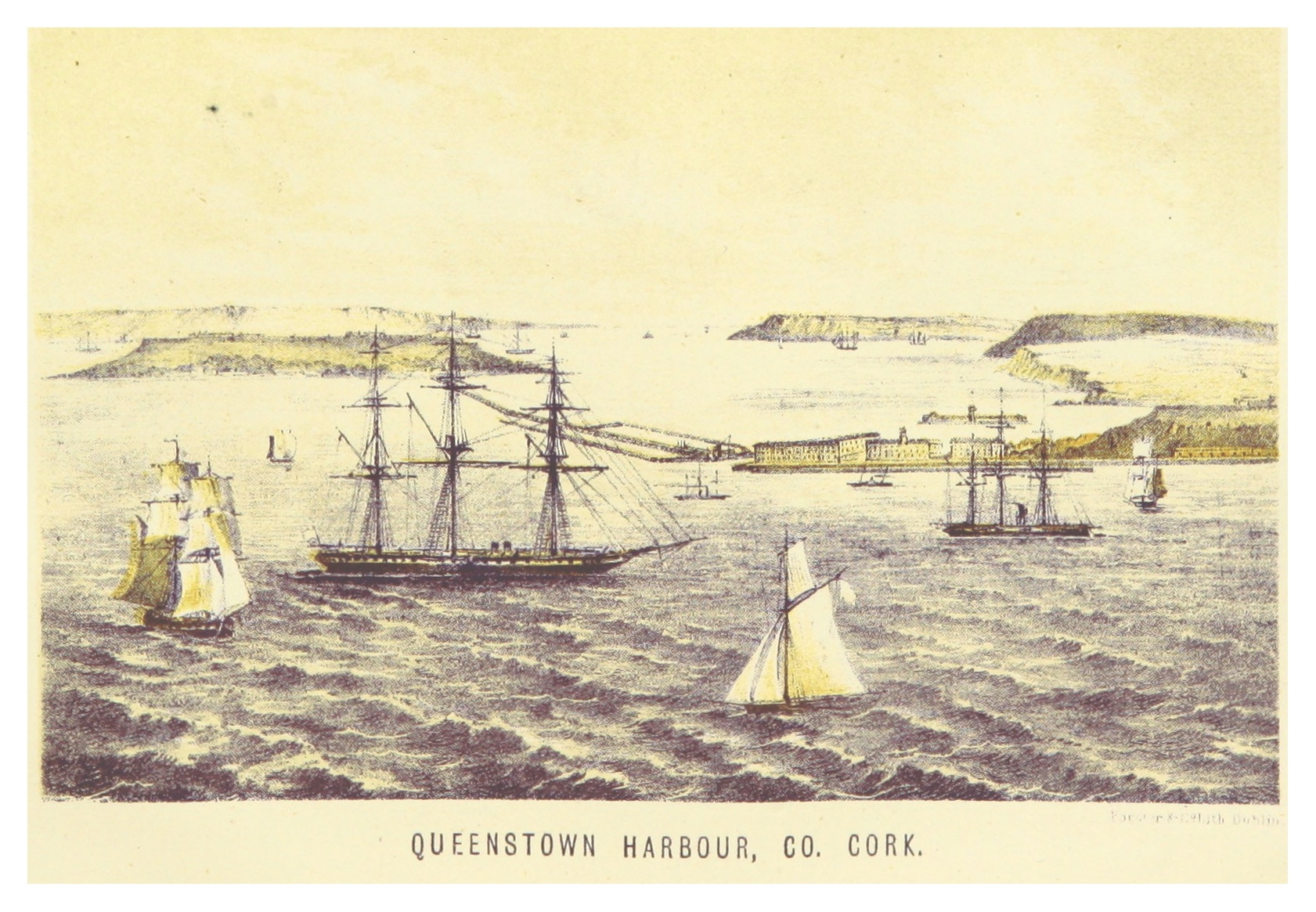
- Queenstown harbour in 1871
- Active: 1793–1922
- Allegiance: United Kingdom
- Branch: Royal Navy
- Garrison/HQ: Cobh (known as Queenstown between 1849 and 1922)

The Commander-in-Chief, Coast of Ireland was both an admiral's post and a naval formation of the Royal Navy. It was based at Queenstown, now Cobh, in Ireland from 1793 to 1919. The admiral's headquarters was at Admiralty House, Cobh.

== History ==
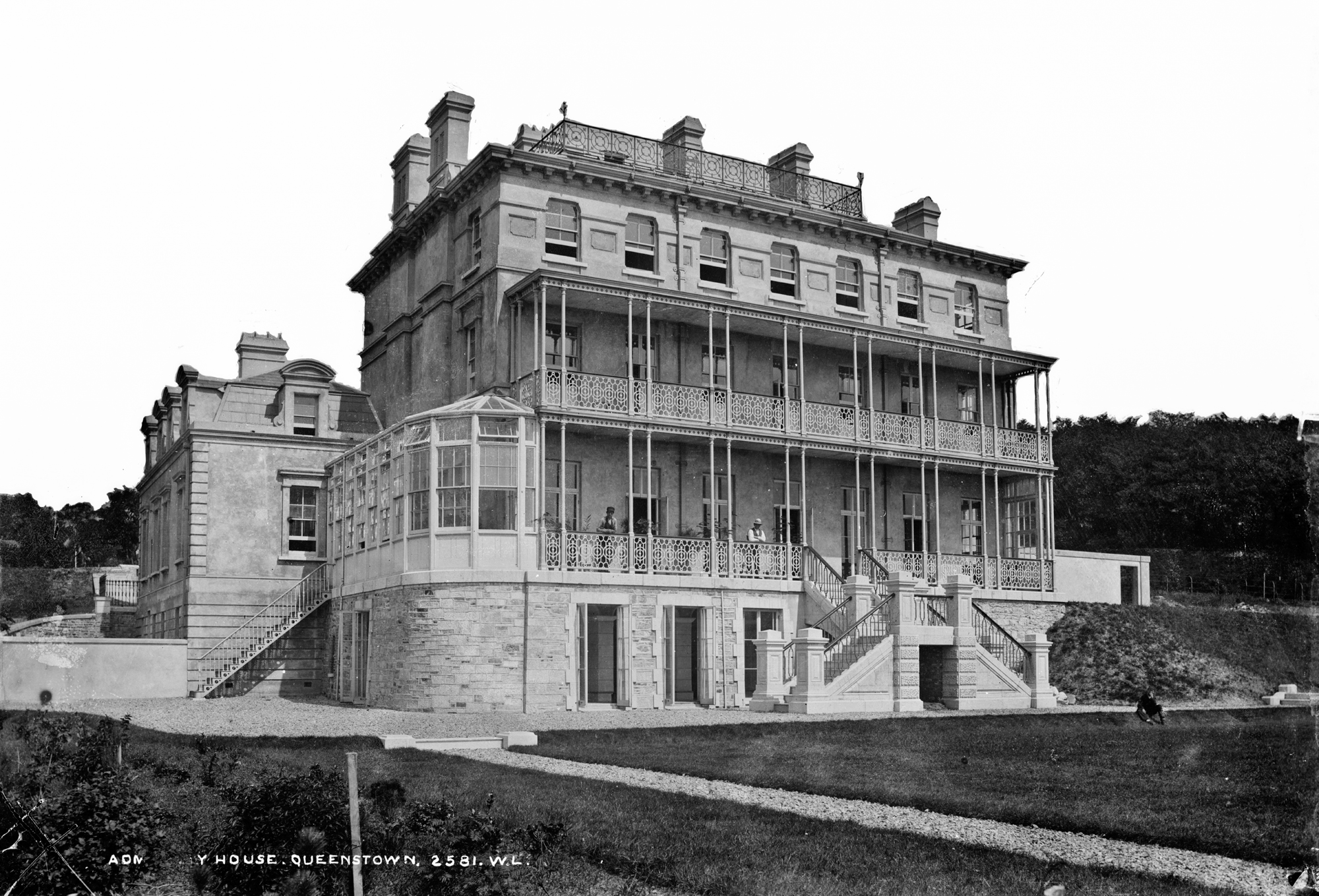
Admiralty House, Cobh, residence of the Commander-in-Chief, Coast of Ireland Station from 1886 to 1922

The French Revolutionary Wars led to Cobh, then usually known as Ballyvoloon or The Cove of Cork, being developed as a British naval port, and assigned an admiral. The first appointment of an "Admiral Commanding in Ireland" or "Commander-in-Chief, Cork" was in 1793. The post remained unfilled between 1831 and 1843. It was renamed "Commander-in-Chief, Queenstown" in 1849 following a visit by Queen Victoria during which she renamed the town of Cobh "Queenstown".

The post became "Senior Officer on the Coast of Ireland" in 1876. The full title of the incumbent following the establishment of the post of Admiral Commanding, Coastguard and Reserves in 1903 was Senior Officer on the Coast of Ireland and Deputy to the Admiral Commanding Coastguard and Reserves for Coastguard Duty in Ireland.

In July 1915, not without misgivings in some quarters, Vice-Admiral Lewis Bayly was appointed to the post. Bayly was tasked with keeping the approaches to Britain safe from U-boat attacks. In 1917, Bayly, promoted to admiral and given the title Commander-in-Chief, Coast of Ireland, was given command of a mixed British-American force defending the Western Approaches. He took as his chief of staff the American captain Joel R. P. Pringle. Bayly had a good working relation with his U.S. counterpart William Sims. He held this post until 1919.

The post became "Commander in Chief, Western Approaches" in 1919, and was disestablished in 1922 when the Irish Free State became independent under the 1921 Anglo-Irish Treaty. That year the town reverted to the name Cobh. Under the terms of the 1921 treaty, the Royal Navy was permitted to station ships at three places in the Free State—one of these "Treaty Ports" being in Cork Harbour, comprising Spike Island and some batteries on the mainland but not in Cobh. The Royal Navy presence generally consisted of two destroyers, one usually anchored in the Cobh roadstead, opposite Haulbowline, and another either on roving patrol, or moored at Berehaven. These 'guard ships' were withdrawn and the facilities at the Treaty Ports handed over to the Irish state in 1938.

== Commanders ==
Commanders included:
No = died in post

=== Commander-in-Chief, Cork ===
- Vice-Admiral Phillips Cosby (1790–1793)
- Vice-Admiral Robert Kingsmill (1793-1800)
- Vice-Admiral Lord Gardner (1800-1802)
- Commodore William Domett (1802–1803)
- Vice-Admiral Lord Gardner (1803–1805)
- Rear-Admiral William O'Bryen Drury (1805–1807)
- Vice-Admiral James Hawkins-Whitshed (1807-1810)
- Vice-Admiral Edward Thornbrough (1810-1813)
- Vice-Admiral Herbert Sawyer (1813-1815)
- Rear-Admiral Benjamin Hallowell (1816-1818)
- Rear-Admiral Josias Rowley (1818-1821)
- Rear-Admiral Lord Colville (1821-1825)
- Vice-Admiral Robert Plampin (1825-1828)

=== Commander-in-Chief on the coast of Ireland ===
- Rear-Admiral Charles Paget (March 1828 – 1831)
- Commodore Sir Edward Troubridge (1831–1832)

=== Commander-in-Chief, Cobh ===
- Rear-Admiral Hugh Pigot (1844-1847)
- Rear-Admiral Thomas Ussher (1847-1848) No

=== Commander-in-Chief, Queenstown ===
- Rear-Admiral Donald Mackay (1848-1850) No
- Rear-Admiral Manley Dixon (1850-1852)
- Rear-Admiral John Purvis (1852-1855)
- Rear-Admiral George Sartorius (1855-1856)
- Rear-Admiral Henry Chads (1856-1858)
- Rear-Admiral Charles Talbot (1858-1862)
- Rear-Admiral Sir Lewis Jones (1862-1865)
- Vice-Admiral Charles Frederick (1865-1867)
- Rear-Admiral Claude Buckle (1867-1868)
- Rear-Admiral Frederick Warden (1868-1869) No
- Rear-Admiral Arthur Forbes (1869-1871)
- Rear-Admiral Edmund Heathcote (1871-1874)
- Rear-Admiral Robert Coote (1874-1876)

=== Senior Officer on the Coast of Ireland ===
- Rear-Admiral Henry Hillyar (1876-1878)
- Vice-Admiral William Dowell (1878-1880)
- Rear-Admiral Richard Hamilton (1880-1883)
- Rear-Admiral Thomas Lethbridge (1883-1885)
- Rear-Admiral Henry Hickley (1885-1886)
- Rear-Admiral Walter Carpenter (1887-1888)
- Rear-Admiral James Erskine (1888-1892)
- Rear-Admiral Henry St John (1892-1895)
- Rear-Admiral Claude Buckle (1895-1898)
- Rear-Admiral Atwell Lake (1898-1901)
- Vice-Admiral Edmund Jeffreys (1901-1904)
- Vice-Admiral Angus MacLeod (1904-1906)
- Rear-Admiral Sir George King-Hall (1906-1908)
- Rear-Admiral Sir Alfred Paget (1908-1911)
- Vice-Admiral Sir Charles Coke (1911-1915)

=== Commander-in-Chief, Coast of Ireland ===
- Admiral Sir Lewis Bayly (1915-1919) (title changed from Senior Officer, Coast of Ireland, to Commander-in-Chief, Coast of Ireland on 4 June 1917)

=== Commander-in-Chief, Western Approaches ===
- Admiral Sir Reginald Tupper (1919-1921)
- Admiral Sir Ernest Gaunt (1921-1922)
