= Charles Coke =

Royal Navy Admiral (1854–1945)

Admiral Sir Charles Coke KCVO
- Born: 2 October 1854; Ropsley, Lincolnshire, England
- Died: 23 February 1945 (aged 90); Exmouth, Devon, England
- Military career
- Allegiance: United Kingdom
- Branch: Royal Navy
- Service years: 1868–1945
- Rank: Admiral
- Commands: HMS Sirius; HMS Talbot; HMS Terpsichore; HMS Scylla; HMS Cornwallis; Sheerness Gunnery School; Commander-in-Chief, Coast of Ireland; Newfoundland Patrol Service
- Conflicts: Third Anglo-Ashanti War; World War I
- Awards: Knight Commander of the Royal Victorian Order

Admiral Sir Charles Henry Coke KCVO (2 October 1854 – 23 February 1945) was a Royal Navy officer who served during the First World War.

== Early life ==
Coke was born on 2 October 1854 in the village of Ropsley in Lincolnshire where his father was the local rector.

== Naval career ==
Coke joined the Royal Navy on 7 April 1868 when he entered the training ship Britannia, in 1872 was appointed a midshipman on the corvette HMS Druid. Coke served during the Third Anglo-Ashanti War and was present during the attack on Elmina on 13 June 1873, he was awarded the Ashantee Medal. He was appointed lieutenant on HMY Victoria and Albert on 5 September 1877. In 1880 he served on the gun-vessel HMS Fly on the China Station, returning to England two years later to do a gunnery course. In 1889 he took command of the sailing brig HMS Pilot. Promoted to Commander in 1892 he moved to HMS Active before moving on to command HMS Ganges, a boys training ship at Falmouth. He became commanding officer of the cruiser HMS Sirius in July 1899, Divisional Transport Officer posted to HMS Eagle in March 1900, and commanding officer of the cruiser HMS Talbot in July 1900. In February 1901 he was appointed commanding officer of the cruiser HMS Terpsichore, serving at the Cape of Good Hope Station. He went on to be commanding officer of the cruiser HMS Scylla in April 1904 and of the battleship HMS Cornwallis in January 1905.

After that Coke became Captain, Sheerness Gunnery School in January 1907, Senior Officer on the Coast of Ireland in April 1911 and commander of the Newfoundland Patrol Service in March 1917.

== Family life ==
Coke married Anna Marie Madeleine Fergusson in 1883 and they had one son and a daughter. Coke died at Hughenden, Exmouth, Devon on 23 February 1945 aged 90.

Military offices
Preceded by Sir Alfred Paget	Senior Officer on the Coast of Ireland; 1911–1914	Succeeded by Robert Stokes
Preceded by Robert Stokes	Senior Officer on the Coast of Ireland; 1914–1915	Succeeded by Sir Lewis Bayly
