= HMS Endymion (1891) =

Edgar-class cruiser of the Royal Navy

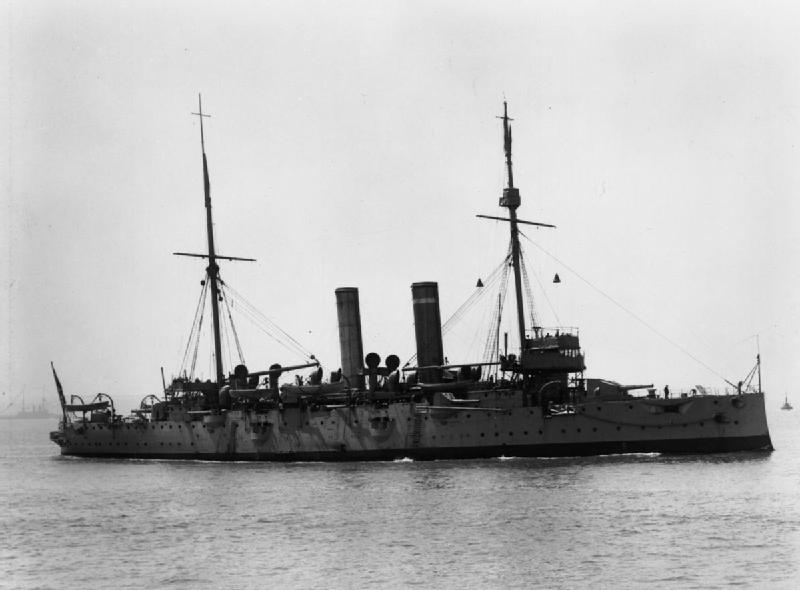
- HMS Endymion

History

United Kingdom
- Name: HMS Endymion
- Namesake: Endymion
- Builder: C & W Earle, Hull
- Laid down: 21 November 1889
- Launched: 22 July 1891
- Commissioned: 26 May 1894
- Fate: Sold for breaking up 16 March 1920

General characteristics
- Class & type: Edgar-class cruiser
- Displacement: 7,350 tons
- Length: 387.5 ft (118.1 m)
- Beam: 60 ft (18 m)
- Armament: 2 × BL 9.2-inch (233.7 mm) Mk VI guns; 10 × QF 6-inch (152.4 mm) guns; 12 × 6-pounder guns

HMS Endymion was a first-class protected cruiser of the Edgar class. She served in China during the Boxer Rebellion and later in the First World War, and was sold in 1920.

== Construction ==
Endymion had a length of 387 feet 6 inches (118.11 m) long overall and 360 feet (109.73 m) between perpendiculars, with a beam of 60 feet (18.29 m) and a draught of 23 feet 9 inches (7.24 m). She displaced 7,350 long tons (7,470 t). Armament consisted of two 9.2 inch guns, on the ships centreline, backed up by ten six-inch guns, of which four were in casemates on the main deck and the remainder behind open shields. Twelve 6-pounder and four 3-pounder guns provided anti-torpedo-boat defences, while four 18 inch torpedo tubes were fitted.

The Edgars were protected cruisers, with an arched, armoured deck 5–3 inches (127–76 mm) thick at about waterline level. The casemate armour was 6 inches (152 mm) thick, with 3 inches (76 mm) thick shields for the 9.2 inch guns and 10 inches (254 mm) armour on the ship's conning tower. It contained four double-ended cylindrical Fairfields boilers feeding steam at 150 pounds per square inch (1,000 kPa) to 2 three-cylinder triple expansion engines, which drove two shafts. This gave 12,000 indicated horsepower (8,900 kW) under forced draught, giving a speed of 20 knots (37 km/h; 23 mph).

== Service details ==
Endymion was launched on 22 July 1891.

Endymion took part in suppressing the Boxer Rebellion in China, during which time future rear admiral and VC recipient Eric Gascoigne Robinson served aboard her. Captain Alfred Paget was appointed in command in February 1901, and in December 1901 she visited Manila, where the Governor and US officers hosted the crew, including many with whom they had served together during the rebellion. She was ordered home in late May 1902, stopping in Singapore on 22 June, Colombo on 5 July, Suez on 22 July, Malta on 28 July, and Gibraltar on 1 August, before she returned to Portsmouth. She took part in the fleet review held at Spithead on 16 August 1902 for the coronation of King Edward VII, and paid off at Chatham on 4 September 1902 when she was placed in the C division of the Medway fleet reserve. In early 1903 she was sent to Harland & Wolff shipyard at Belfast to be refitted.

She was flag ship in Cork Harbour in 1914.

Endymion served in the First World War in the Gallipoli Campaign. On 30 August 1918, she was damaged at Stavros, Greece by the Imperial German Navy submarine SM UC-37; her crew survived.

Endymion was sold for breaking up at Cardiff on 16 March 1920.
