= Atwell Lake =

Royal Navy Admiral (1842–1915)

Admiral Atwell Lake
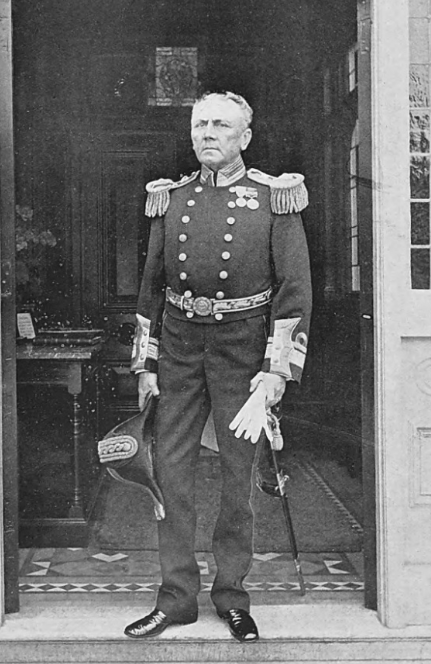
- Lake c.1898
- Born: 11 April 1842
- Died: 27 August 1915 (aged 73)
- Relatives: Sir Atwell Henry Lake, 9th Baronet (son); Henry Atwell Lake (father)
- Military career
- Allegiance: United Kingdom
- Branch: Royal Navy
- Rank: Admiral
- Commands: HMS Nelson; HMS Orlando; Flag Officer, Gibraltar; Coast of Ireland Station

Admiral Atwell Peregrine MacLeod Lake (11 April 1842 – 27 August 1915) was a Royal Navy officer who became Senior Officer, Coast of Ireland Station.

== Family ==
Lake was born in 1842. Henry Atwell Lake was his father and Sir James Samuel William Lake, 4th Baronet was his grandfather. Sir Atwell Henry Lake, 9th Baronet was his son.

== Naval career ==
Lake became commanding officer of the cruiser HMS Nelson in January 1885, commanding officer of the cruiser HMS Orlando in May 1888 and commanding officer of HMS Nelson again in August 1888. He went on to be Captain of the Royal Naval College, Greenwich in February 1889, Flag Officer, Gibraltar in January 1892, Captain, Fleet Reserve, Portsmouth in March 1895 and Senior Officer, Coast of Ireland Station from January 1898 until February 1901. He was promoted to vice admiral on 9 September 1901, and retired from the navy at his own request on 1 July 1902. He received promotion to Admiral on the Retired list on 24 May 1905.

Military offices
Preceded by Claude Buckle	Senior Officer, Coast of Ireland Station; 1898–1901	Succeeded by Edmund Jeffreys
