= HMS Archer (1849) =

Sloop of the Royal Navy

History

United Kingdom
- Name: HMS Archer
- Ordered: 26 March 1846; Re-ordered 25 April 1847
- Builder: Deptford dockyard
- Cost: £41,404
- Laid down: 18 October 1847
- Launched: 27 March 1849
- Commissioned: 2 April 1850
- Honours and awards: Baltic 1854 = 55
- Fate: Broken up 15 March 1866

General characteristics
- Type: Screw sloop
- Displacement: 1,337 tons
- Tons burthen: 97040/94 bm
- Length: 186 ft 4 in (56.8 m) gundeck; 162 ft 6 1/4 in (49.5 m) keel reported for tonnage
- Beam: 33 ft 10 in (10.3 m) maximum, 33 ft 6 in (10.2 m) reported for tonnage
- Draught: 14 ft 3/4 in (4.3 m) mean
- Depth of hold: 19 ft 0 in (5.8 m)
- Installed power: 202 nhp, 347 ihp (259 kW)
- Propulsion: 2-cylinder horizontal geared single-expansion steam engine; Single screw
- Sail plan: Full-rigged ship
- Complement: 170
- Armament: 2 × 68-pounder (87 cwt) guns; 10 × 32-pounder (42cwt) guns

HMS Archer was initially ordered as one of two Rifleman type gunvessels on 25 April 1846. With her construction suspended in September 1846, she was reordered as a sloop on 25 April 1847 to be constructed to a design of John Edye as approved on 25 August. With the exception of two years on Baltic service during the Russian War of 1854 to 1855 she spent the majority on the West Coast of Africa on the anti-slavery patrol. This service involved anti-slavery work on the coasts of the Bight of Benin, and was notoriously unhealthy, with tropical diseases taking a heavy toll of British seamen. One of her commanders died and three others were invalided. Archer was reclassified as a corvette in 1862. She finally returned to Home waters, being sold for breaking in January 1866

Archer was the second named vessel since its introduction for a 12-gun gun brig launched by Perry at Blackwall on 2 April 1801 and sold on 14 December 1815.

== Construction ==
She was laid down at Deptford Dockyard on 18 October 1847 and launched on 27 March 1849. She was completed for sea on 9 March 1850 at a cost of £41,404 (including hull of £20,785).

== Commissioned Service ==
=== First Commission ===
Her first commission was on 2 April 1850 at Plymouth under Commander James N. Strange, RN for service with the West Africa Squadron performing anti-slaving patrols. By December 1852 she had returned to Home Waters and was assigned to Fishery Protection Squadron at Leith, Scotland. On 15 November 1853 she was paid off at Woolwich.

=== Second Commission ===
She recommissioned for service in the Baltic Sea during the war with Russia on 25 February 1854 under Captain Edmund Heathcote, RN. She returned to Home Waters in December 1855 then was assigned to the North America and West Indies Station by June 1856. She returned to pay off at Woolwich on 11 June 1857.

=== Third Commission ===
On 21 May 1858 she commissioned under Captain John Sanderson, RN for service on the West Coast of Africa. Captain Sanderson died in 1859 being replaced by Commander Richard W. Courtenay, RN on 17 August 1859. Captain Frederick A.B. Crauford, RN took command on 4 April 1860 when Commander Courtenay was invalided. This service involved anti-slavery work on the coasts of the Bight of Benin, and was notoriously unhealthy, with tropical diseases taking a heavy toll of British seamen. She returned to Home Waters and paid off at Woolwich on 5 October 1861.

=== Fourth Commission ===
Her last commission started on 30 March 1863 under Captain John Bythesea, RN for service on the West Coast of Africa. When Captain Bythesea became invalided, Captain Francis Marten, RN took command on 11 April 1864. During 1865 Archer was in action against Congo River Pirates. She returned to Home Waters at the end of 1865.

=== Disposition ===
Upon her arrival in Home Waters, she paid off at Woolwich on 30 January 1866. She was sold to Henry Castle & Sons, arriving at Charlton on 15 March 1866.

HMS Archer was awarded the Battle Honour Baltic 1854 – 55.

Archer was reclassified as a corvette in 1862, although her sister officially remained a sloop.
