= Arthur Forbes (Royal Navy officer) =

Royal Navy Admiral (died 1891)

Admiral Arthur Forbes
- Died: 20 March 1891
- Military career
- Allegiance: United Kingdom
- Branch: Royal Navy
- Rank: Admiral
- Commands: HMS Calypso; HMS Curacoa; HMS Renown; Queenstown

Admiral Arthur Forbes (died 20 March 1891) was a Royal Navy officer who became Commander-in-Chief, Queenstown.

== Naval career ==
Forbes became commanding officer of the sixth-rate HMS Calypso in July 1851, commanding officer of the frigate HMS Curacoa in May 1857 and commanding officer of the second-rate HMS Renown in November 1857. His last appointment was as Commander-in-Chief, Queenstown in November 1869 before he retired in May 1871.

Military offices
Preceded by Frederick Warden	Commander-in-Chief, Queenstown; 1869–1871	Succeeded by Edmund Heathcote
