= HMS Redpole =

Several ships of the Royal Navy have been named HMS Redpole after the redpoll.

- HMS Redpole (1808), a Cherokee-class brig-sloop launched in 1808 that became a Post Office Packet Service packet, sailing out of Falmouth, Cornwall. She sailed from Rio de Janeiro for Falmouth on 10 August 1828, under the command of Lieutenant Bullocke, RN. She was reportedly sunk in August 1828 in action with Congress, an 18-gun pirate ship, or insurgent privateer of Buenos Aires, off Cape Frio after an engagement of an hour and a quarter.
- HMS Redpole (1855) a paddle tug, formerly HMS Racehorse. In service until 1872
- HMS Redpole (1889), a Redbreast-class gunboat on the China Station launched in 1889 and scrapped in 1906.
- HMS Redpole (1910) was an Acorn-class destroyer launched in 1910 and scrapped in 1921.
- HMS Redpole (U69) was a Black Swan-class sloop launched in 1943 and scrapped in 1960.
- HMS Redpole (P259) was initially the Royal Air Force Long Range Recovery and Support Craft Sea Otter, and from 1985 to 1994 served the Royal Navy as the Bird-class patrol vessel HMS Redpole.
