= Sir Edward Lake, 1st Baronet =

Sir Edward Lake, 1st Baronet (1600 – 18 July 1674) was a lawyer who became advocate general of Ireland. He was a Royalist, badly wounded in the Battle of Edgehill, and was the first of the Lake baronets. Sir Edward also became chancellor and vicar General of the diocese of Lincoln, England.

== Origins ==
Edward Lake was the oldest son of Richard Lake and his first wife Anne, (or Ann) née Wardall This surname was sometimes spelled as "Wardell". His parents were married on 18 May 1600 in Keelby, Lincolnshire. On the same day at Keelby, Anne's sister Margaret, married John Markham. Anne (Note: Ann's oldest sister, Ursula Wardall, was baptized in Killingholme, on the 24th of December 1573. Ann's other sister, Margaret who was married on the same day as Ann, was baptized in Killingholme, on the 19th of February 1576. No baptism specifically for an "Ann/Anne Wardall" can be found as a daughter of Edward Wardall for around this time. However, further down the same page in the Killingholme register that Margaret's baptism is recorded on there was an "Angnis Wardall, dowghter of Edward Wardall." This baptism occurred in February 1578 with the actual date being obscured. Angnis may have actually been Annis and shortened over time to Ann by 1600 at the time of her marriage to Richard Lake. Ann also had a younger sister named Katherine (transcribed Kattran), who was baptized in Killingholme on the 5th of June 1582. Katherine was buried in Habrough, Lincolnshire, on the 31st of May 1593. Ann became the youngest daughter of Edward Wardall after this date. She is described as the youngest daughter and co-heir of Edward Wardall of Keelby in the 1666 Visitation of Lincolnshire, among other sources. Habrough is 3.6 miles north from Keelby. This was the same village that Ann's oldest sister Ursula, married George Dean at on the 11th of November 1594. It was also the same village where Ann's mother was buried in 1595.) was a daughter of Edward Wardall, a yeoman, who was a Churchwarden of Keelby in 1600.His name is listed as a Churchwarden at the bottom of the same register page on which the marriages of his two daughters Ann, and Margaret were recorded at Keelby. Ann's mother, "Jannett Wardell" was buried in Habrough, on 15 May 1595. (Note: Edward Wardall married "Joan" Swallow as written in the parish register in Killingholme, Lincolnshire, on the 13th of January 1572.This date is using the "old style" calendar. His bride was a widow of Edward Swallow who was buried on the 23rd of March 1571 (two days before the end of that year) in Killingholme. Prior to this she was a widow of Stephen Milson, who was buried on the 26th of January 1566 in Killingholme. Edward Swallow and "Joan" Milson were married in Killingholme, on the 20th of July 1567. In Edward Swallow's will, he mentions Dorothy Milson as his daughter in-law. And he names his wife as "Janet/Jennet." This name is a variant transcription of Joan or Jane. Ann's half-brother, Michael Swallow, also mentioned in Edward Swallow's will, married in Keelby the day after Ann and her sister Margaret.) Edward Lake's maternal grandfather Edward Wardall, was buried on 8 July 1619 in Keelby. (Note: He was buried five days after the burial of his second wife in Keelby: "Ciceleye Wardall, wife of Edward Wardall") Edwards Lake's father, Richard, was born in 1570 in Irby upon Humber and baptised there on 16 July. He was a son of John Lake. Irby is just over five and a half miles from the village of Keelby. Richard's first wife died before 1615. His second wife was Anne Morrelly (or "Morriley"). She was baptised in Claxby, Lincolnshire, on 1 February 1583. Their oldest son, Thomas Lake, was baptised in Tetney, on 11 August 1615. Richard Lake was a Tailor, and died in 1626 in Tetney. He made his will on 2 September 1626.

== Early life and education ==
Edward was born in 1600 and baptised on 22 February 1600, in Tetney, Lincolnshire. This was nine months after his parents were married, as prior to 1752, England used the Julian Calendar, and the year began on 25 March. A memorial inscription in All Saints' Church, Normanton, Yorkshire states that he was 77 when he died on 18 July 1674, (Note: This memorial inscription at All Saint's Church in Normanton, was laid in reference to a clock left in Sir Edward Lake's will as a gift to the church. He was not even aware that there was a church at Normanton, which was the home to his paternal ancestors: "To the church or chappell of Normanton, near Pontefract, in Yorkshire (if there be a church or chappell there, which I know not), where my paternall ancestors have lived for many years, a clock, and a sum for the maintaining and keeping of it forever. " The memorial at Normanton is written in latin. His death date is shown as "18 die Julii", it should actually read "18 die lulii" for July. George Edward Cockayne's Complete Baronetage, page 313, states that Sir Edward Lake died on the 18th of April 1674. But the same page also then states that Sir Edward made the last codicil to his will on the 8th of June 1674. And in this codicil he is described as being "of Bishop Norton in the county of Lincoln."This is the same village as stated on his Normanton memorial. Sir Edward's will, before the later added codicils in it, was written at Lincoln, on the 8th of April 1665. And he did indeed make the last codicil to that will on the 8th of June 1674. His residence at that time in this codicil is given as Bishop Norton. Part of this June the 8th 1674 codicil was that he wished: "To be buryed in Lincoln Minster as neare as may be to my deare wife as the Deane and Chapter will give leave, if not at Norton. " And Edward was buried in Lincoln Cathedral on the 20th of July 1674. The burial register of the church of St Margaret In The Close Lincoln, referring to Sir Edward's burial in 1674 reads "Sr Ed'Lake, buried in the Minster - July.20." This burial date is also given in George Edward Cockayne's book Complete Baronetage, further on the same page that he earlier had given the 18th of April 1674, as being Edward's death date. Therefore the death date of the 18th of April 1674 for Sir Edward Lake, given by George Edward Cockayne was a mistake by him. This same death date of the 18th of April 1674, has also been given for Edward on A Cambridge Alumni Database. The source for this date of death again comes from George Edward Cockayne, but this time his Lincolnshire Pedigrees book.) which would point to him being born in about 1597. However, it was not uncommon at this time for there to be errors on ages at burial.

When his father Richard died in Tetney in September 1626, Edward was named as Richard's oldest son in his will. Richard left Edward two shillings. The rest of Edward's half-siblings were to have thirty shillings each. Edward's stepmother died a year later in Tetney. He was not mentioned in the will of his stepmother. But Edward's half-siblings, Thomas, Ambrose, John, Luke, and Anne all were. These five half-siblings of Edward were all previously mentioned in the will of Richard Lake. (Note: In the will of Richard Lake, he mentions his son, also named Richard. This Richard was not mentioned a year later in the will of Anne Lake, just as Edward was not mentioned.) Thomas, John, and Luke, were later mentioned in Edward's original will, dated 8 April 1665 in Lincoln. (Note: John Lake was baptized on the 19th of November 1618, in Tetney. Luke Lake was baptized on the 18th of October 1620, in Tetney.) Anne's brother, John Morriley of Claxby, was named as the executor of her will. John had previously been named as Richard's brother in-law, and executor of Richard Lake's will in 1626.

He studied at St Catharine Hall, Cambridge, and gained a BA in 1626. He then studied at St Alban's Hall, Oxford (now incorporated into Merton College), and graduated as a BCL (Bachelor of Civil Law), from there on 24 January 1628. In the following year, Edward received a Master of Arts from Cambridge University. In 1636, he was incorporated at Cambridge as an LL.B (Bachelor of Laws), graduating in 1637 as an LL.D (Legum Doctor).

== Adult life ==
Edward Lake became a lawyer and was appointed Advocate general of Ireland. From 1639 he represented Cavan in the Irish Parliament, and helped to draft the clerical subsidies bill in the following year. But he was expelled from the Commons in Ireland on 9 November 1640. This was as a result of "misconduct" while on a grand committee that was set up to investigate certain privileges which had been claimed by Michael Stanhope, the register.

Following the outbreak of the English Civil War he joined the Royalist forces and fought in the Battle of Edgehill, on Sunday 23 October 1642. In this battle he received sixteen wounds. His left arm was wounded by a shot. He bravely held the bridle of his horse with his teeth, while fighting with his sword in the right hand. He was captured and imprisoned at Great Crosby, Lancashire, but escaped after seven weeks. Edward was safe in Bangor, Caernarvonshire by Christmas of 1642.

On 30 December 1643 King Charles I awarded him a warrant for a baronetcy in recognition of his services, but no patent was taken out at the time. Charles I also promised him some compensation for the loss of his estates. Following the Restoration, he petitioned for the restoration of lands, preferment, and the award of the baronetcy. He was made Chancellor of the diocese of Lincoln in 1660. In this position Edward was the Bishop's Chancellor. This was a separate role from the Chancellor of the cathedral.

The copy of a Patent confirming the armorial augmentations to Sir Edward Lake were signed and sealed by Sir William Dugdale, Norroy King of Arms on 12 June 1661. He was not given back his lands but was given a baronetcy. He was given the baronetcy of Carnow, County Wicklow Ireland, by patent. This baronetcy was created on 10 July 1661.

The Augmentation to his Coat of Arms included an addition of a second crest which was a picture of him, reins in teeth, sword in right hand, and in some, 16 drops of blood. Photo attached of coat of arms.

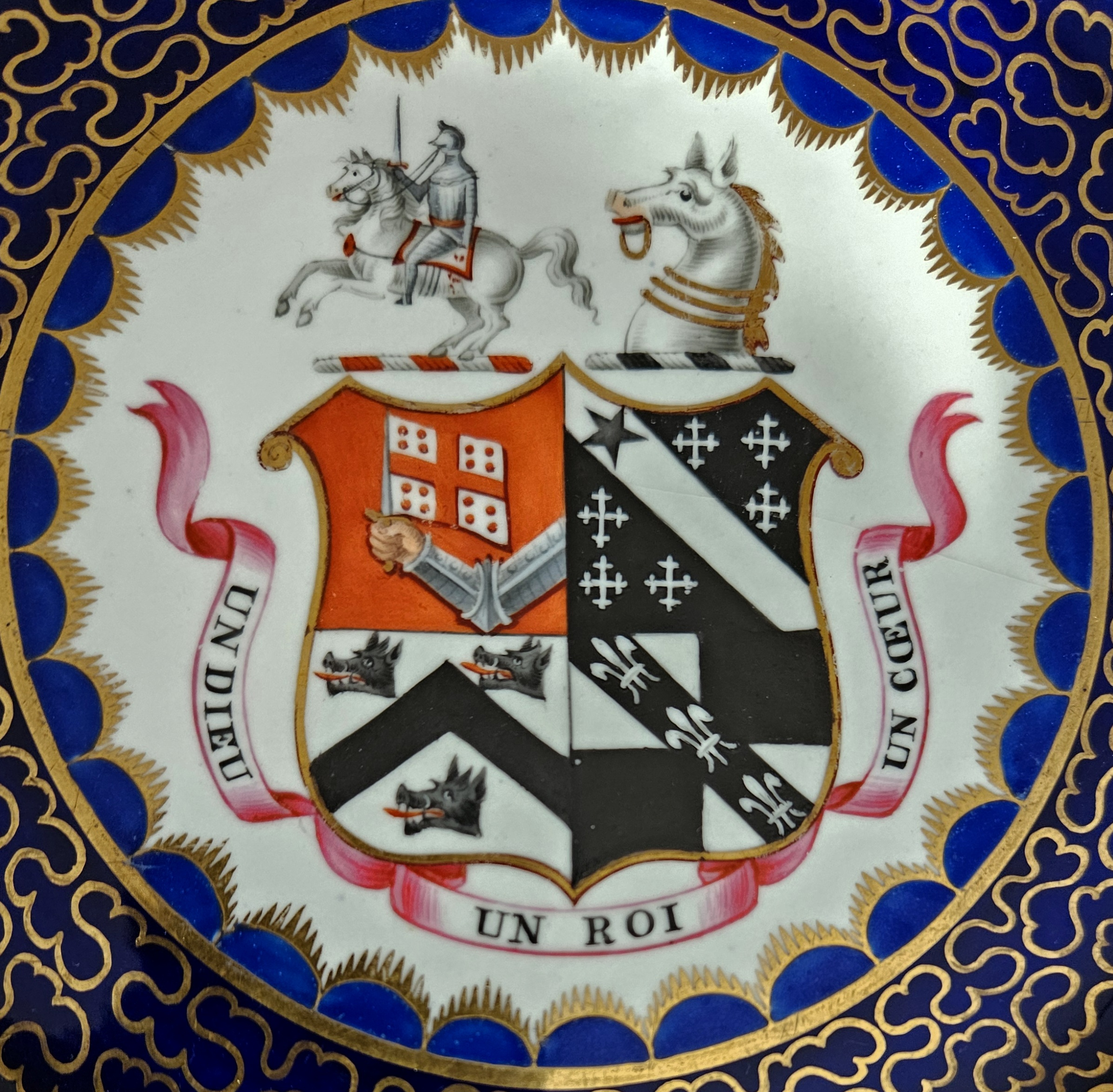

Sir Edward became Vicar General of the diocese of Lincoln in 1661. In this role, Edward was the principal official of the Bishop of Lincoln. On 14 November 1666 Edward King (Parliamentarian) presented a petition of grievances against Sir Edward Lake at a parliamentary committee. These grievances included extortion and other illegal conduct. Edward King printed and published a petition against Sir Edward. The accusations published were judged to be false, and "stuffed with illegal assertions, ineptitudes, imperfections, clogged with gross ignorances, absurdities, and solecisms. " And so Edward satisfied this committee about his conduct, and the case was judged in his favour at the Guildhall in London, on 22 May 1667.

== Marriage ==
Edward Lake married Anne Bibye, daughter of Simon Bibye of Bugden, Huntingdonshire. They were married on 13 January 1629, at the church of St Martin Orgar, London. At the time of marriage, Edward was described on the register as being of St Margaret's, Westminster. They had one son, Edward Lake, who died before 1665. He was baptised on 13 November 1630 at the church of St Margaret's, Westminster, London. Anne was still alive at the time that Sir Edward Lake made his will in Lincoln on 8 April 1665. But she had died by the time he made the first codicil to his will on 6 October 1670.

== Death and burial ==
Sir Edward Lake died on 18 July 1674. He died at Bishop Norton, Lincolnshire. (Note: The memorial to Sir Edward Lake in Lincoln Cathedral in Latin states he was of Norton "Depositum D. Edri Lake de Norton". Also, the monument to Thomas Lake, nephew to Sir Edward (son of Edward's half-brother Thomas), and Sir Edward's heir, states that Sir Edward was "Late of Bishop's Norton, in the county of Lincoln") He was buried two days later in Lincoln Cathedral. Edward's wife Anne had previously been buried in the cathedral. In the codicil to his will dated 8 June 1674, he wished to be buried as near to his wife in the cathedral as possible. The burial was registered at the church of St Margaret In The Close, Lincoln. A memorial to Sir Edward Lake was erected on a pillar near the west door of the cathedral. This memorial was placed there by Sir Edward's nephew and heir, Thomas Lake. At some point before 1730, this monument fell into disrepair. The part of his monument exhibiting the arms, and crest of Sir Edward Lake survived. The remains of this were exhibited in a small chapel in Lincoln Cathedral, called Bishop Russell's chantry. A few years before 1907, part of Edward's monument displaying his arms and crest, were fixed to the south wall of the cloister in Lincoln Cathedral. By this time it had broken in two pieces. The Latin inscription on the monument had been lost. But it was written down on paper, and was published in 1848, by Rev. S. Blois Turner, in the Lincoln volume of his book Proceedings Of The Archaeological Institute. On 11 April 1907 a tablet in marble with the original Latin inscription carved upon it was fixed below the remains of the arms and crest. It was erected by the Dean and Chapter, with descendants of Thomas Lake, and members of the Curtois families.

== The fate of his baronetcy ==
The baronetcy became extinct on his death. But in 1711 his great-nephew Bibye Lake, son of Sir Edward's heir, Thomas, successfully petitioned to be made a baronet in recognition of his great-uncle's services to the Crown and the circumstances in which the baronetcy had become extinct.

== Writings ==
- An account of his interviews with Charles I, edited by T. P. Taswell-Langmead for Camden Society's Miscellany. vol. iv, 1858
- Memoranda: touching the Oath Exofficio, pretended Self-Accusation, and Canonical Purgation. Together with some notes about the making of some new, and alteration and explanation of some old, laws. All most humbly submitted to the consideration of this Parliament, London, 1662.

Baronetage of Ireland
New creation	Baronet (of Carnow); 1661–1674	Extinct
