= Claude Buckle (Royal Navy officer, born 1839) =

Royal Navy officer (1839–1930)

Admiral Claude Buckle
- Born: 7 February 1839
- Died: 7 February 1930 (aged 91)
- Military career
- Allegiance: United Kingdom
- Branch: Royal Navy
- Rank: Admiral
- Commands: HMS Invincible; HMS Superb; HMS Hercules; Coast of Ireland Station

Admiral Claude Edward Buckle (7 February 1839 – 7 February 1930) was a Royal Navy officer who became Senior Officer, Coast of Ireland Station.

== Naval career ==
Buckle became commanding officer of the battleship HMS Invincible in May 1884, commanding officer of the battleship HMS Superb in July 1886 and commanding officer of the battleship HMS Hercules in April 1887. He went on to be Senior Officer, Coast of Ireland Station in January 1895 before he retired in January 1898.

Military offices
Preceded by Henry St John	Senior Officer, Coast of Ireland Station; 1895–1898	Succeeded by Atwell Lake
