= Alfred Paget (Royal Navy officer) =

Royal Navy Admiral (1852–1918)

Admiral Sir Alfred Paget KCB KCMG DSO
- Born: 26 March 1852; London, England
- Died: 17 June 1918 (aged 66); Brompton, London, England
- Relatives: William MacGregor
- Military career
- Allegiance: United Kingdom
- Branch: Royal Navy
- Service years: 1865–1911
- Rank: Admiral
- Commands: HMS Astraea; HMS Endymion; HMS Royal Sovereign; HMS Charybdis; HMS Scylla; Senior Officer on the Coast of Ireland
- Conflicts: Anglo-Egyptian War; Boxer Rebellion; World War I
- Awards: Knight Commander of the Order of the Bath; Knight Commander of the Order of St Michael and St George; Distinguished Service Order

Admiral Sir Alfred Wyndham Paget, KCB, KCMG, DSO (26 March 1852 – 17 June 1918) was a Royal Navy officer who served as Senior Officer on the Coast of Ireland.

== Naval career ==
Paget joined the Royal Navy in 1865. He saw action in the Anglo-Egyptian War and then served in Eastern Sudan. He was promoted to captain on 30 June 1896, and went on to serve as naval attaché in Paris, Petrograd and then Washington, D.C. between 1896 and 1899. He saw action on the China Station as commanding officer of the cruiser HMS Astraea in June 1899 during the Boxer Rebellion and then became commanding officer of the cruiser HMS Endymion in February 1901. The Endymion served on the China station until late May 1902, when she left for the United Kingdom. She took part in the fleet review held at Spithead on 16 August 1902 for the coronation of King Edward VII, and Paget paid her off at Chatham on 4 September 1902.

He went on to be commanding officer of the battleship HMS Royal Sovereign in May 1903, commanding officer of the cruiser HMS Charybdis in March 1904 and commanding officer of the cruiser HMS Scylla in March 1905. In HMS Scylla he served on the North America and West Indies Station carrying out protection duties for the Newfoundland fisheries.

After that he became Senior Officer, Coast of Ireland Station in 1908 before retiring in 1911. He was made a KCB in the 1911 Coronation Honours.

With no opportunity to serve as an admiral during the first world war he gained a commission in the Royal Navy Reserve as a commander, at one point being in charge of an armed yacht to support patrol flotillas in the North Sea, he was promoted in the RNR and retired due to ill health in 1917.

== Family ==
On 7 May 1906 Paget married Alpina Viti MacGregor; they had one daughter, Honor.

Paget died at 34 Hans Road in Brompton on 17 June 1918 of bronchitis. His wife had been devoting herself to the war work in France. It was said 'the strain of receiving the bereaved widows and mothers at a centre behind the firing line... proved too much for her strength', and she died on 13 September 1918; both deaths adding to the sorrowful and final year of her father Sir William MacGregor (1846–1919).

Military offices
Preceded by Sir George King-Hall	Senior Officer, Coast of Ireland Station; 1908–1911	Succeeded by Sir Charles Coke
