= HMS Cadmus (1856) =

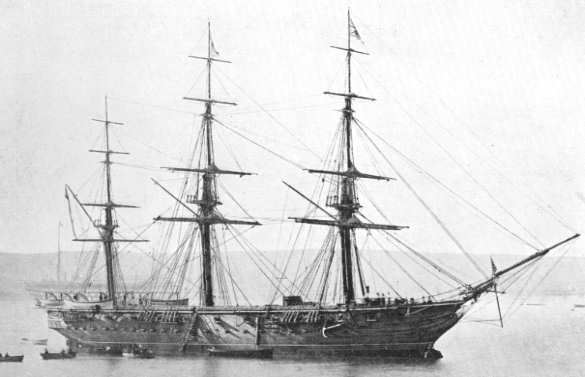

History

United Kingdom
- Name: HMS Cadmus
- Launched: 20 May 1856
- Out of service: 1874
- Fate: Broken up 1879

General characteristics
- Class & type: Pearl-class corvette
- Tonnage: 1461 tons
- Length: 200 feet
- Propulsion: Screw
- Armament: 21

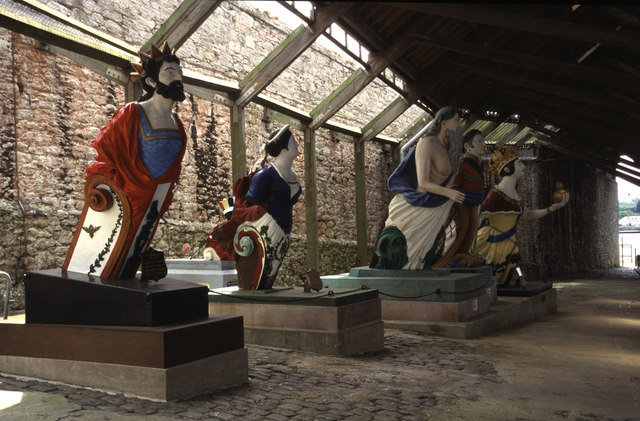
figurehead of Cadmus (far left) at Devonport Dockyard

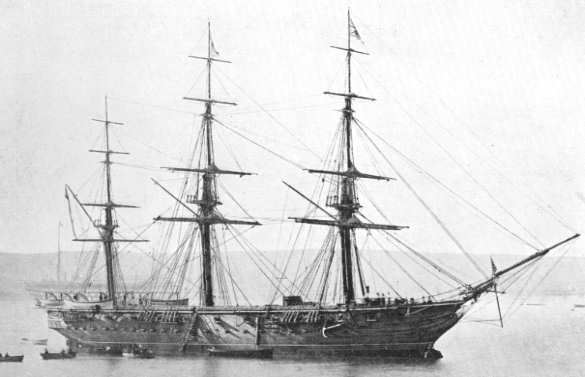
HMS Cadmus circa 1860's

HMS Cadmus was a wooden screw corvette launched on 20 May 1856 at Chatham Dockyard. On 4 January 1865, she ran aground at Chatham, Kent. She was refloated. Cadmus struck rocks at Salcombe on 5 June 1869 and was severely damaged. She was consequently beached. She was taken in to Plymouth the next day. She was broken up in 1879 at Devonport.
