= Lake baronets =

Set index for Lake baronets

There have been two baronetcies created for persons with the surname Lake, one in the Baronetage of Ireland and one in the Baronetage of Great Britain. As 2026 one creation is extant.

- Lake baronets of Carnow (1661): see Sir Edward Lake, 1st Baronet (c. 1599–1674)
- Lake baronets of Middle Temple (1711)
