= HMS Clarence =

Three ships of the Royal Navy have been named HMS Clarence:

- The first HMS Clarence (1812), launched in 1812, was a 74-gun third-rate ship of the line, renamed HMS Centurion in 1826, broken up in 1828.
- The second HMS Clarence (1827), launched in 1827, was an 84-gun second-rate ship of the line originally called HMS Goliath, made a training ship in 1872 and deliberately burnt in 1884 in the River Mersey.
- The third Clarence, originally a 120 first-rate ship of the line called HMS Royal William launched in 1833, reduced to a 72-gun screw ship in 1860, renamed to Clarence in 1885 and used as a training ship. Accidentally burnt in 1899 in the River Mersey.
