= List of shipwrecks in February 1857 =

The list of shipwrecks in February 1857 includes ships sunk, wrecked or otherwise lost during February 1857.

== 1 February ==
List of shipwrecks: 1 February 1857
Ship	State	Description
Earl of Leicester	United Kingdom	The ship ran aground on the Barnard Sand, in the North Sea off the coast of Norfolk. She was refloated and taken in to Great Yarmouth, Norfolk in a leaky condition.
Encantador	Brazil	The brig was driven ashore and wrecked on the north coast of Brazil. Her crew were rescued.
Gustave	France	The schooner was wrecked on the Elbow End Sand, at the mouth to the River Tay with the loss of all hands. She was on a voyage from Amsterdam, North Holland, Netherlands to Dundee, Forfarshire, United Kingdom.
Isabella	United Kingdom	The ship ran aground on the Orange Keys. She was on a voyage from Matanzas, Cuba to the Clyde. She was refloated on 11 February and taken in to Nassau, Bahamas, where she was condemned.
La Belle Barbarie	United Kingdom	The ship foundered in the Mediterranean Sea. Her crew were rescued. She was on a voyage from Galaţi, Ottoman Empire to Queenstown, County Cork.
Phaeton	United Kingdom	The ship was wrecked in Guichen Bay. All on board survived. She was on a voyage from Hong Kong to Adelaide, South Australia.
Twee Gebroeders	Belgium	The ship sank off the "Hoek van Baarland". Her crew were rescued. She was on a voyage from Brussels, Brabant to Amsterdam, North Holland, Netherlands.
Volo	United Kingdom	The ship ran aground at Santoña, Spain. She was on a voyage from Cork to Bilbao. She was refloated and taken in to Santoña in a leaky condition.

== 2 February ==
List of shipwrecks: 2 February 1857
Ship	State	Description
Cyrus	United Kingdom	The ship ran aground on the Sparrow Hawk Sand and was damaged. She was on a voyage from Great Yarmouth, Norfolk to Newcastle upon Tyne, Northumberland.
George Potts	United Kingdom	The ship was damaged by fire at South Shields, County Durham.
Jeune Looy	France	The fishing smack ran aground and was wrecked at Weymouth, Dorse, United Kingdom.
Mabon	United Kingdom	The schooner ran aground on the Annot Sand, in the North Sea off the coast of Forfarshire. Her crew were rescued by the Montrose Lifeboat. She was on a voyage from Seaham, County Durham, to Arbroath, Forfarshire.
Robert and William	United Kingdom	The sloop was driven ashore at Blyth, Northumberland. Her crew were rescued by a pilot boat. She was on a voyage from Great Yarmouth to Blyth. She was refloated and beached.

== 3 February ==
List of shipwrecks: 3 February 1857
Ship	State	Description
Cargey	United Kingdom	The brig was driven ashore at between Dymchurch and New Romney, Kent. She was on a voyage from South Shields, County Durham to Odesa. She was refloated and taken in to The Downs in a leaky condition.
Elizabeth Bentley	United Kingdom	The ship put in to Lisbon, Portugal in a waterlogged condition. She was on a voyage from Saint John, New Brunswick, British North America to Liverpool, Lancashire. She was consequently condemned.
Hecla	United Kingdom	The ship sank off Texel, North Holland, Netherlands. She was on a voyage from Norden, Kingdom of Hanover to Hull, Yorkshire.
Hope	United Kingdom	The ship was driven ashore and sank at Bondicar, Northumberland. She was on a voyage from Sunderland, County Durham to Aberdeen.
St. Andrew	United Kingdom	The steamship ran aground at Latakia, Ottoman Syria. She was on a voyage from Liverpool, Lancashire to Beyrout, Ottoman Syria.
Sarepta	United Kingdom	The ship was wrecked near Jaffa, Ottoman Syria.

== 4 February ==
List of shipwrecks: 4 February 1857
Ship	State	Description
Henrietta Helen	United Kingdom	The ship ran aground on the Blackshaw Bank, in the Solway Firth. She was on a voyage from Maryport, Cumberland to Dumfries. She was refloated on 21 February and taken in to Glencaple, Dumfriesshire.
Jane	United Kingdom	The ship was wrecked on the Kirton Reef, in the North Sea off the coast of Aberdeenshire. Her crew were rescued. She was on a voyage from Leith, Lothian to Cromarty.
Mary Eliza	United States	The ship was abandoned in the Atlantic Ocean. Her crew were rescued. She was on a voyage from Jamaica to New York.
Nile	United Kingdom	The brig was driven ashore on Lovell's Island, Massachusetts, United States.

== 5 February ==
List of shipwrecks: 5 February 1857
Ship	State	Description
Hope	United Kingdom	The ship ran aground on the Newcombe Sand, in the North Sea off the coast of Suffolk. She was refloated and taken in to Lowestoft, Suffolk in a leaky condition.
Highlander	United Kingdom	The ship ran aground on the Newcombe Sand. She was on a voyage from Newcastle upon Tyne, Northumberland to Poole, Dorset. She was refloated and assisted in to Lowestoft.
Mary	United Kingdom	The schooner was wrecked at Punta Engano, Dominican Republic. All on board were rescued. She was on a voyage from Saint Thomas, Virgin Islands to Puerto Plata, Dominican Republic.
Mary Sophia	United Kingdom	The ship was driven ashore and wrecked at Port Talbot, Glamorgan. She was on a voyage from Bordeaux, Gironde, France to Swansea, Glamorgan.
Sulli	France	The ship was wrecked at Holyhead, Anglesey, United Kingdom with the loss of thirteen of her fifteen crew. She was on a voyage from Bordeaux to Liverpool, Lancashire, United Kingdom.

== 6 February ==
List of shipwrecks: 6 February 1857
Ship	State	Description
Bank of England	United Kingdom	The ship was driven ashore at Hastings, Sussex. She was on a voyage from London to Bombay, India. She was refloated and put back to London.
Columbine	United Kingdom	The ship was wrecked at "Rio Nova", Africa. Her crew survived.
Friend Iles	United Kingdom	The ship was in collision with another vessel and was abandoned 20 nautical miles (37 km) off the Île de Batz, Finistère. She was on a voyage from Cardiff, Glamorgan to London. She was subsequently towed in to Brest, Finistère.

== 8 February ==
List of shipwrecks: 8 February 1857
Ship	State	Description
H. M. Dowd	United States	The tug caught fire and sank at Albany, New York.
Hope	United Kingdom	The ship sank at Ramsgate, Kent.
Neptune	Wismar	The ship ran aground on the Falsterbo Reef, in the Baltic Sea. She was on a voyage from Wismar to Leith, Lothian, United Kingdom. She was refloated on 10 February and taken in to Helsingør, Denmark.
Pomona	United Kingdom	The ship sprang a leak and was beached at Harwich, Essex. She was on a voyage from South Shields, County Durham to Havana, Cuba.
Ravensbourne	United Kingdom	The steamship struck a sunken object and sank off Vlissingen, Zeeland, Netherlands. All on board were rescued. She was on a voyage from Antwerp, Belgium to London.
R. I. Grant	United States	The tug caught fire and sank at Albany.
Ripper	United Kingdom	The ship was driven ashore and wrecked at Figueira da Foz, Portugal.
Western World	United States	The steamship caught fire at Albany and was scuttled.

== 9 February ==
List of shipwrecks: 9 February 1857
Ship	State	Description
Nimrod	United Kingdom	The schooner was wrecked at Sines, Portugal with the loss of a crew member.
Queen of the East	United Kingdom	The ship was wrecked at Sines.
Workington	United Kingdom	The brig sprang a leak and was beached on Stewart Island, New Zealand. She was on a voyage from Melbourne, Victoria to New Zealand.

== 10 February ==
List of shipwrecks: 10 February 1857
Ship	State	Description
Françcoise	France	The brig ran aground on the Tongue Sand, in the Thames Estuary. Her ten crew were rescued by the smack New Union (United Kingdom). Françoise was on a voyage from Newcastle upon Tyne, Northumberland, United Kingdom of Great Britain and Ireland to Saint-Louis, Senegal. She was refloated and towed in to Harwich, Essex, United Kingdom.
Industria	Portugal	The brig was holed by ice and sank at New York, United States. She was subsequently beached.
Novar	United Kingdom	The ship struc the Navestone Rock, off the coast of Northumberland and was damaged. She was on a voyage from Seaham, County Durham to Dundee, Forfarshire. She was assisted in to Lindisfarne, Northumberland in a leaky condition.
Pensher	United Kingdom	The ship ran aground on the Sizewell Bank, in the North Sea off the coast of Suffolk. She was on a voyage from Sunderland, County Durham to London. She was assisted in to Lowestoft, Suffolk in a leaky condition.
Queen of the East	United Kingdom	The schooner was wrecked at Sines, Portugal.
Sardinia	United Kingdom	The steamship ran aground on the Newcombe Sand, in the North Sea off the coast of Suffolk. She was on a voyage from London to South Shields, County Durham.

== 11 February ==
List of shipwrecks: 11 February 1857
Ship	State	Description
August	Denmark	The schooner ran aground and was wrecked off Alt Skagen with the loss of all but three of her crew. She was on a voyage from Leith, Lothian, United Kingdom to Bornholm.
Golden Star	United States	The ship ran aground on the Gingerbread Ground, off the Bimini Islands. She was on a voyage from Liverpool, Lancashire, United Kingdom to New Orleans, Louisiana. She was refloated but found to be severely leaky and was beached. Golden Star was assisted in to Nassau, Bahamas with the aid of the schooner Tweed and nineteen other schooners (all (United Kingdom of Great Britain and Ireland) Bahamas). She sank there whilst under repair.
Marco Polo	United Kingdom	The ship foundered off Cape St Vincent, Spain. She was on a voyage from Cádiz, Spain to Buenos Aires, Argentina.
Redbreast	United Kingdom	The ship was driven ashore and wrecked at Faro, Portugal with the loss of three of her crew. She was on a voyage from Cádiz, Spain to Liverpool, Lancashire.

== 12 February ==
List of shipwrecks: 12 February 1857
Ship	State	Description
Ballochan	United Kingdom	The ship ran aground at Cherbourg, Seine-Inférieure and was severely damaged. She was on a voyage from British Honduras to London.
Hezekiah Williams	United States	The full-rigged ship was driven ashore and wrecked at "Port Jolly", Nova Scotia, British North America. She was on a voyage from Liverpool, Lancashire, United Kingdom to New York.
Les Amis	France	The brig ran aground on the Longsand, in the North Sea off the coast of Essex, United Kingdom and was abandoned. She was taken in to Harwich, Essex in a severely leaky condition with the assistance of three smacks.
Merchant	United Kingdom	The ship ran aground on the Kentish Knock. She was on a voyage from South Shields, County Durham to Torre del Mar, Spain. She was refloated and taken in to Ramsgate, Kent in a leaky condition.

== 13 February ==
List of shipwrecks: 13 February 1857
Ship	State	Description
Logie o'Buchan	United Kingdom	The ship was wrecked on the Longsand, in the North Sea off the coast of Essex.
Tempest	United Kingdom	The steamship departed from New York, United States for Glasgow, Renfrewshire. No further trace, presumed foundered with the loss of 150 lives.

== 14 February ==
List of shipwrecks: 14 February 1857
Ship	State	Description
Arthur	United Kingdom	The ship was abandoned in the Atlantic Ocean. She was towed in to Queenstown, County Cork on 3 April by the steamship Don Pedro (Flag unknown).
Colombus	Duchy of Holstein	The schooner ran aground off Harboøre, Denmark with the loss of a crew member.
Mary Matthew	United Kingdom	The ship ran aground and was wrecked at Latakia, Ottoman Syria. She was on a voyage from Alexandria, Egypt to Latakia.

== 15 February ==
List of shipwrecks: 15 February 1857
Ship	State	Description
Arthur	United Kingdom	The ship was abandoned in the Atlantic Ocean. Her crew were rescued by A. Batigde (Portugal). Arthur was on a voyage from Savannah, Georgia, United States to the Clyde.
Betsey	United Kingdom	The schooner ran aground near "Voel Nant". She was on a voyage from Dublin to Liverpool, Lancashire.
Chattahoochie	United States	The ship was run ashore and wrecked near Wexford, United Kingdom. She was on a voyage from Liverpool, Lancashire, United Kingdom to Savannah, Georgia.
Pons Œili	United Kingdom	The barque ran aground on the South Triangles. She had been refloated by 17 April and taken in to Belize City, British Honduras for repairs.
Volusia	United Kingdom	The brig ran aground on the Shipwash Sand, in the North Sea off the coast of Suffolk. She was refloated and resumed her voyage.
Wearmouth	United Kingdom	The steamship ran aground on the Shipwash Sand. She was refloated and resumed her voyage.

== 16 February ==
List of shipwrecks: 16 February 1857
Ship	State	Description
Columbian	United Kingdom	The ship ran aground at Charleston, South Carolina, United States. She was on a voyage from Liverpool, Lancashire to Charleston.
Ivanhoe	United Kingdom	The steamship ran aground on the Bush Rock, off the Farne Islands, Northumberland. She was on a voyage from Rotterdam, South Holland, Netherlands to Leith, Lothian. She was consequently taken in to Lindisfarne, Northumberland in a waterlogged condition.
Rifleman	United Kingdom	The schooner ran aground on the Scroby Sands, in the North Sea off the coast of Norfolk. She was on a voyage from Newcastle upon Tyne, Northumberland to Rouen, Seine-Inférieure, France. She was refloated the next day and taken in to Great Yarmouth, Norfolk for repairs.

== 17 February ==
List of shipwrecks: 17 February 1857
Ship	State	Description
Arcole	United States	The ship ran aground in the Delaware River.
Eurydice	United Kingdom	The brig was driven ashore and wrecked in Table Bay. She was on a voyage from Liverpool, Lancashire to Port Elizabeth, Cape Colony.
Ralph Thompson	United Kingdom	The derelict ship was driven ashore and wrecked near Peniche, Portugal.
Rifleman	United Kingdom	The ship ran aground on the Scroby Sands, Norfolk. She was on a voyage from Newcastle upon Tyne, Northumberland to Rouen, Seine-Inférieure, France. She was refloated and assisted in to Great Yarmouth, Norfolk in a leaky condition.

== 18 February ==
List of shipwrecks: 18 February 1857
Ship	State	Description
Black Diamond	United Kingdom	The steamship ran aground at Sunderland, County Durham. She was on a voyage from Sunderland to London. She was refloated the next day and resumed her voyage.
Elizabeth	United Kingdom	The ship ran aground at Sunderland. She was on a voyage from Sunderland to Cette, Hérault, France. She was refloated and put back to Sunderland in a leaky condition.

== 19 February ==
List of shipwrecks: 19 February 1857
Ship	State	Description
Grimsby	United Kingdom	The ship was abandoned off Cannasharry Point, County Sligo. She was on a voyage from Taganrog, Russia to Sligo. She was taken in to Sligo the next day.

== 20 February ==
List of shipwrecks: 20 February 1857
Ship	State	Description
Java	United Kingdom	The ship arrived at Gibraltar from Liverpool in a leaky condition, having struck the nearby Pearl Rock, off Punta Carnero, Spain, in the Strait of Gibraltar.
Margaret Alice	United Kingdom	The ship sprang a leak and was beached at Dunmore East, County Waterford. She was on a voyage from New Ross, County Wexford to Milford Haven, Pembrokeshire.
Prince Philippe	Belgium	The ship was damaged by an explosion in her cargo of coal at South Shields, County Durham. A crew member was killed and two were severely injured.

== 21 February ==
List of shipwrecks: 21 February 1857
Ship	State	Description
Colipi	Chile	The schooner was wrecked at Coquimbo.
Falcon	United Kingdom	The ship was driven ashore and wrecked at Killala, County Mayo. She was on a voyage from Liverpool, Lancashire to Ballina, County Mayo.
Madrid	United Kingdom	The paddle steamer struck an uncharted rock and was wrecked at Viana do Castelo, Portugal. She was on a voyage from Southampton, Hampshire to Gibraltar. Her passengers and crew were rescued.
Malta	United Kingdom	The brig ran aground on the Whitby Rock. She was on a voyage from South Shields, County Durham to London. She was refloated.
Rosario, or Rosarita	Spain	The full-rigged ship caught fire off Valparaíso, Chile. She was beached with the assistance of HMS Monarch (Royal Navy) and was burnt out.
William Hutt	United Kingdom	The steamship ran aground on the Holm Sand, in the North Sea off the coast of Suffolk. She was on a voyage from South Shields to Havre de Grâce, Seine-Inférieure. She was refloated on 22 February.

== 22 February ==
List of shipwrecks: 22 February 1857
Ship	State	Description
Henriette Geertruida	Netherlands	The barque was driven ashore at Gibraltar. She was refloated several days later.
Matilda	Netherlands	The schooner collided with HMS Bulldog (Royal Navy) in the English Channel off Eastbourne, Sussex and was damaged. She was taken in tow by HMS Bulldog but ran aground on the Boulder Bank and capsized. She was righted the next day and taken in to Newhaven, Sussex for repairs.
Unicorn	United Kingdom	The ship was driven ashore and wrecked at Killala, County Mayo. She was on a voyage from Liverpool, Lancashire to Sligo. She broke up on 23 March.
Ville de Quimper	France	The schooner was wrecked at "Torre Carbonera" with the loss of one of her seven crew. She was on a voyage from Cette, Hérault to Dunkirk, Nord.

== 23 February ==
List of shipwrecks: 23 February 1857
Ship	State	Description
Boadicea	United Kingdom	The ship ran ashore in the North East Pass. She was on a voyage from Liverpool, Lancashire to New Orleans, Louisiana, United States.
Carlton	United Kingdom	The ship ran aground on the Kish Bank. She was on a voyage from Liverpool, Lancashire to Fernando Po, Equatorial Guinea. She was refloated and put back to Liverpool in a leaky condition.
Ludenheit	Prussia	The schooner was wrecked off Varberg, Sweden. Her crew were rescued. She was on a voyage from Memel to Hull, Yorkshire, United Kingdom.
Ludvig	Denmark	The ship was driven ashore 2 nautical miles (3.7 km) south of Helsingør. She was on a voyage from Copenhagen to Leith, Lothian, United Kingdom. She was refloated and assisted in to Helsingør.
Mary Winch	United Kingdom	The ship caught fire at Kronstadt, Russia and was ordered to be sunk.

== 24 February ==
List of shipwrecks: 24 February 1857
Ship	State	Description
Betsey	United Kingdom	The ship ran aground on the Brist Rock, off the coast of Ayrshire. She was on a voyage from Larne, County Antrim to Irvine, Ayrshire.
Lavinia	United Kingdom	The brig was driven ashore at Agger, Denmark. She was on a voyage from Newcastle upon Tyne, Northumberland to Gothenburg, Sweden. She was refloated and resumed her voyage.
Mary	United Kingdom	The sloop was run down in the North Sea off the coast of Northumberland by Christian (United Kingdom). Her crew were rescued by Christian. Mary was on a voyage from Arbroath, Forfarshire to Seaham, County Durham. Mary was subsequently towed in to Berwick upon Tweed, Northumberland by the steamship Ayrshire (United Kingdom).
Niels Gylding	Russia	The ship was in collision with Wynaud (United Kingdom) and sank in the English Channel. Her cre survived. She was on a voyage from Messina, Sicily to Saint Petersburg.
Sea	United Kingdom	The ship was driven ashore at Redcar, Yorkshire. She was on a voyage from South Shields, County Durham to London. She was refloated and resumed her voyage.

== 25 February ==
List of shipwrecks: 25 February 1857
Ship	State	Description
Eugenie	United Kingdom	The barque was wrecked on reefs off Flacq, Mauritius. Her crew survived. She was on a voyage from Newfoundland, British North America to Mauritius.
Richard Mount	United Kingdom	The ship ran aground off "Busker". She was on a voyage from Sunderland, County Durham to Gothenburg, Sweden. She was refloated the next day and taken in to Lysekil, Sweden.
Secret	United Kingdom	The ship capsized at Jersey, Channel Islands.

== 26 February ==
List of shipwrecks: 26 February 1857
Ship	State	Description
Joseph Somes	United Kingdom	The ship was destroyed by fire off Tristan da Cunha. All on board survived. She was on a voyage from Blackwall, Middlesex to Melbourne, Melbourne.
Stantons	United Kingdom	The ship was wrecked at Cromer, Norfolk. Her crew were rescued. She was on a voyage from Hartlepool, County Durham to Exeter, Devon.

== 27 February ==
List of shipwrecks: 27 February 1857
Ship	State	Description
Falcon	United Kingdom	The ship was driven ashore at Newburgh, Fife. She was refloated on 3 March.
Lark	United Kingdom	The ship struck a rock and sank in the River Fowey. She was refloated on 3 March. She was refloated on 4 February.
Sarah	United Kingdom	The ship struck the Plough Seat Rock, off Lindisfarne, Northumberland and sank. She was on a voyage from Newcastle upon Tyne, Northumberland to Dundee, Forfarshire.
Struggler	United Kingdom	The ship was wrecked in Sweetnose Bay, in the White Sea. Her crew survived.
Tutelina	United Kingdom	The ship was wrecked in Sweetnose Bay. Her crew survived.
Princess	United States	River steamboat; boilers exploded near Baton Rouge, Louisiana; at least 70 dead.

== 28 February ==
List of shipwrecks: 28 February 1857
Ship	State	Description
Thetis	Netherlands	The ship was run down and sunk in the Irish Sea by the steamship Trebizond ( Austrian Empire) with the loss of her captain.
Undien	United Kingdom	The ship struck the Chiens Pennans Rocks, off the coast of Vendée, France. She was on a voyage from Sunderland, County Durham to Bordeaux, Gironde. She was refloated and taken in to the Île d'Yeu, Vendée.

== Unknown date ==
List of shipwrecks: Unknown date in February 1857
Ship	State	Description
Africano	Portugal	The brigantine sprang a leak off Cape Spartel, Morocco. She was towed in to Gibraltar Bay by the brigantine Vrouw Maria (Netherlands) but sank there.
Augusta	Norway	The barque ran aground on the Goodwin Sands, Kent, United Kingdom. She was on a voyage from South Shields, County Durham, United Kingdom to Rio de Janeiro, Brazil. She was refloated on 26 February and taken in to The Downs.
Barbara Ann	United Kingdom	The ship was driven ashore in the Black Sea before 20 February.
Bienvenue	France	The ship was wrecked at Bayonne, Basses-Pyrénées.
Cathedral	United States	The full-rigged ship foundered in the Pacific Ocean. Her 35 crew were rescued by the full-rigged ship Abel Tasman Gower and the barque Anne Pitcairn Sharp (both United Kingdom).
Colipí	Chilean Navy	The schooner was wrecked at Coquimbo.
Crown	United Kingdom	The ship ran aground between the Ajax and Pacific Reef before 14 February. She was on a voyage from New Orleans, Louisiana, United States to Liverpool, Lancashire. She became severely hogged and was declared a total loss.
Douro	United Kingdom	The ship was wrecked near Sulina, Ottoman Empire before 20 February.
Florida	United States	The pilot boat was destroyed by fire at Key West, Florida before 13 February.
Furioso	Austrian Empire	The ship was wrecked at Sulina in late February with some loss of life. Survivors were rescued by Barbara (United Kingdom).
Garland	United Kingdom	The ship foundered in the Black Sea before 20 February. Her crew were rescued. She was on a voyage from Galaţi, Ottoman Empire to a British port.
James Alexander	United Kingdom	The ship capsized at Demerara, British Guiana before 9 February. She was later righted.
Jeune Clara	France	The ship was wrecked at Bayonne.
J. L. Warner	United Kingdom	The ship was driven ashore near Wexford on or before 2 February.
Maria Eulalie	United Kingdom	The ship was wrecked at Bayonne.
Oolong	United States	The fishing schooner was lost on Georges Bank. Lost with all 9 crew.
Samuel Russel	United States	The ship was driven ashore in Chesapeake Bay in early February.
Speedwell	United Kingdom	The ship was severely damaged by fire at Port Dundas, Renfrewshire. She was on a voyage from Amsterdam, North Holland, Netherlands to Port Dundas.
Sovereign	United Kingdom	The steamship ran aground. She was on a voyage from Malta to Tunis, Beylik of Tunis.
Sultan	United States	The ship was driven ashore in Chesapeake Bay in early February.
Thomas Fielden	United Kingdom	The ship ran aground in the Thanlwin before 10 February. She was on a voyage from Moulmein, Burma to a British port. Although severely hogged, she was refloated and resumed her voyage.
Troubadour	Spain	The barque was driven ashore on the Isle of Pines, Cuba and was abandoned.
Vesper	United Kingdom	The ship was wrecked near Sulina before 20 February.
Workington	(United Kingdom of Great Britain and Ireland) Victoria	The brig ran aground on Stewart Island, New Zealand, after taking on water during a storm in Foveaux Strait. There were no deaths.
