= Thomas Leeke Massie =

Royal Navy Admiral (1802–1898)

Admiral Thomas Leeke Massie
- Born: 20 October 1802; Coddington Hall, Cheshire
- Died: 20 July 1898 (aged 95); Chester
- Military career
- Allegiance: United Kingdom
- Branch: Royal Navy
- Rank: Admiral
- Commands: HMS Cleopatra; HMS Powerful
- Conflicts: Battle of Navarino; Second Anglo-Burmese War

Thomas Leeke Massie (20 October 1802 – 20 July 1898) was an officer of the Royal Navy, who rose to the rank of admiral.

== Life ==
He was born at Coddington Hall, Cheshire, on 20 October 1802. He entered the navy in October 1818 on board HMS Rochfort, flagship in the Mediterranean of Sir Thomas Francis Fremantle, and later on of Sir Graham Moore. In different ships he continued serving in the Mediterranean, being wrecked in HMS Columbine on the coast of the Morea on 25 January 1824. He was in HMS Martin at the demonstration against Algiers under Sir Harry Burrard Neale, and was frequently engaged in boat affairs with Greek pirates. He was in HMS Asia at Battle of Navarino on 20 October 1827.

He was rewarded with promotion to lieutenant on a death vacancy, on 11 November 1827. As a lieutenant he served mostly in the Channel, North Sea, and Lisbon station. He was for three years on the South American station with Captain Robert Smart in HMS Satellite, and for two years in the Mediterranean as first lieutenant of HMS Carysfort with Henry Byam Martin. On 28 June 1838, Queen Victoria's coronation, he was made commander; and in 1839 was, with some others, sent out to Constantinople to assist in organising the Ottoman Navy. They were, however, recalled after about six months; and in March 1840 Massie was appointed (as second captain) to HMS Thunderer with Maurice Frederick Fitzhardinge Berkeley. In the Thunderer he took part in the operations on the coast of Syria in the summer and autumn of 1840, during the Oriental Crisis of 1840, culminating in the capture of Acre, for which he was promoted to be captain on 17 March 1841.

In April 1849 he was appointed to HMS Cleopatra, which he commanded in the East Indies and China and during the Second Anglo-Burmese War. In September 1854 he commissioned HMS Powerful, which during the latter part of 1855 and 1856 was on the North American station. He had no further service, but became rear-admiral on 7 November 1860, vice-admiral on 2 April 1866, and admiral on 20 October 1872, being placed on the retired list in 1866. He died at Chester on 20 July 1898.
