= Victory (1847 ship) =

History
- Name: Willis, Gunn and Co; Wilson and Cook
- Builder: Fenwick & Co., Sunderland
- Launched: 1847

General characteristics
- Tons burthen: 578 or 579 (bm)
- Sail plan: Barque

Victory was built by Fenwick & Co, Sunderland in 1847, and owned by Willis, Gunn and Co (the company advertised as H H Willis and Co) and later owned by Wilson and Cook. She was a 578- or 579-ton barque that brought some of the first immigrants from England to Dunedin in July 1848. She also called at Wellington, New Zealand, in August 1848. There was an advertisement that gave her weight as 700 tons, but, given that her captain in 1851 was Mullens, it was unlikely to be another ship.

== Revolt ==
Among the Wellington-bound passengers was Charles Borlase, one of Wellington's early mayors. The ship's captain was William Lennox Mullens and had sailed from Deal on 6 March 1848. She first arrived in Port Chalmers on 8 July 1848 and then sailed to Wellington, arriving on 16 August 1848. A journey of 163 days. The ship then sailed to Sydney in September/October.

This journey to New Zealand was eventful. Mr L Langland, a passenger, had kept a diary of the journey. The ship left Gravesend on 3 March and had run into bad weather in the English Channel, sheltering at Cowes for ten days. The captain's treatment of the crew was poor and the relationship between both deteriorated. A seaman named Robinson, respected by the crew, kept matters under control. He was a good sailor and popular with the passengers. The captain was described as very reserved man who kept to himself and was aloof from the crew. Just before the ship reached the Bay of Biscay, the crew, with Robinson's help, refused to obey an unreasonable order from the captain. The captain was unable to obtain the support of the passengers and relented. Robinson took charge from then on whenever the weather was rough, with the captain having little to do with the running of the ship. On arriving in Dunedin, Robinson was arrested and charged with assault. He and three crew members were imprisoned for a short period, eventually being released to join the crew of a visiting whaler.

== Death of Captain Mullens ==
Captain Mullens met a tragic end. The ship was chartered to carry Chinese coolies from Cumsingmoon to Callao, Peru. She sailed from China on 6 December 1851, with more than 350 on board and a general cargo. The ship normally carried just over 100 migrants, so the conditions would have been poor. Mistreatment of coolie migrants was common, and mutinies by them were becoming more frequent at the time of this voyage.

Between 2 pm and 3 pm on 10 December 1851, while near Pulo Supato in the South China Sea, the coolies, led by Ah-mang, commandeered the ship. They killed Captain Mullens, Second Mate James Aransono, cook Edward Bailey, and seaman Henry Watt. The remaining crew were disarmed. Chief Mate William Vagg, who had survived, was compelled by the coolies to steer the ship. He first sailed for Point Kamao (the southernmost point of Vietnam), but the coolies, on finding the area uninhabited, directed him to sail to Koon Chin or Ko-nana, Cochin China. That proved too difficult, so he was forced to steer for the island of Pulo Ubi, about 20 km (12 mi) south of Point Kamao, where they anchored. Pulo Ubi and Point Kamao were considered part of Cambodia at that time. About 50 coolies left the boat at Pulo Ubi after destroying its papers and log books, as well as taking most of its cargo. The boat then sailed to another island to the east of Pulo Ubi, where the remainder of the coolies left.

During the voyage, fights had broken out among the coolies, and on at least one occasion, some tried to set fire to the boat. A number were killed or murdered, including Ah-mang, and a number were thrown overboard alive. The crew had made a couple of attempts to escape, but these were unsuccessful. After the coolies left, Vagg sailed for Singapore, arriving there on about 29 January 1852.

Thirty of the coolies from Victory were located at Kamao and captured by the rajah. He had them deported to Pulo Ubi. The remainder were reported to be at Hoonding in Cambodia, and it was rumoured that the king was going to banish them. The Singapore papers reported that the naval commander-in-chief at Singapore was going to order HMS Cleopatra, under Captain Thomas L Massie, and SV Semiramis, an East India Company frigate, to call at these places on their way to China. These boats left Singapore on 17 March.

== Voyages ==
Two brothers, William and Alexander Sloane, sailed to Australia in the barque Victory, leaving England on 3 April 1849 and landing at Melbourne on 19 July following. William went on to be senior partner in William Sloane & Co of Melbourne. Alexander was one of the pioneers of the Riverina, owning the grazing properties Savernake Station and Mulwala Station; the locality of Sloane in New South Wales is named after him.

Victory Barque, Captain Mullens, arrived at Stanley, Falkland Islands on 8 October 1849 from London England with Pensioners etc. namely 134 men women and children; with a cargo of houses and appurtenances. 'Victory sailed from Stanley on 27 November 1849. [[The Shipping Registers Jane Cameron National Archives Ref [SHI/REG/1] Stanley Falkland Islands]]

She returned to Auckland, New Zealand, again under Captain Mullens, on 1 February 1851 and then to Wellington on 22 March 1851, having left London on 4 October 1850 via Sydney.

She was again in Australia on 28 February 1853, sailing for London via Bombay under Captain W Vagg.

The ship sailed from London on 29 December 1853 to Perth arriving 23 or 24 March 1854.

On 24 May 1855, the ship, under Captain Slaphins, was back in Sydney, having sailed on 6 February from Southampton with another load of immigrants.

Victory was still sailing to New Zealand in the late 1850s and early 1860s. She brought migrants to Lyttelton in May 1859 and again in 1860, and to Dunedin from Glasgow in 1861 under Captain Stevens. On 17 June 1859, her return journey, she sailed from Lyttelton to London via Batavia. On 13 October 1863, under Captain Gregory, she brought Lancashire immigrants to Timaru and other parts from Southampton. The paper also noted that the ship's owner had changed.

The ship's fate is unknown.

== Co-existing ships ==
There were at least five other ships with the name Victory that co-existed with this ship and sailed in the same waters:

- a 600-ton sailing ship Victory that was at Singapore in January 1852
- a 164 ft 6 in (50.14 m), 1855 785-ton Victory on the Liverpool–Australia service, built by O E Tam & Co Quebec and owned by H Campbell.
- a 146 ft (45 m), 1860 595-ton Victory owned by Briggs of Sunderland and used on the Sunderland–Australia service.
- steam ship Victory of 501 tons, under Captain Toogood that ran aground on a beach (now called Victory Beach) on Otago Peninsula near Dunedin in 1861. This ship sailed on the Trans-Tasman service.
- a 1119-ton, 205 ft (62 m) iron Victory built at Glasgow in 1863 and owned by Potter & Co, that made her maiden voyage to Port Chalmers.
