= Stephen Lushington (Royal Navy officer) =

Rohal Navy Admiral (1803–1877)

Admiral Sir Stephen Lushington GCB
- Born: 12 December 1803
- Died: 28 May 1877 (aged 73); Oak Lodge, Thornton Heath, Surrey
- Relatives: Dr Stephen Lushington (uncle)
- Military career
- Allegiance: United Kingdom of Great Britain and Ireland
- Branch: Royal Navy
- Service years: 1816–1877
- Rank: Admiral
- Commands: HMS Aetna; HMS Cleopatra; HMS Retribution; HMS Vengeance; HMS Albion
- Conflicts: Battle of Navarino; Morea expedition; Crimean War; Siege of Sevastopol
- Awards: Knight Grand Cross of the Order of the Bath; Chevalier of the Order of Saint Louis; Order of the Redeemer; Commandeur of the Legion of Honour; Order of the Medjidie, Second Class; Crimea Medal; Turkish Crimea Medal

Admiral Sir Stephen Lushington GCB (12 December 1803 – 28 May 1877) was an officer in the Royal Navy who served during the Crimean War. Long and distinguished service in the Mediterranean brought him honours and rewards.

Lushington was born into a gentry family, the son of a baronet, while his uncle was a judge and a member of parliament. Stephen entered the navy shortly after the end of the Napoleonic Wars, and after serving under a number of officers in far-flung locations like the Mediterranean and the South American coast, rose through the ranks. He was particularly active against pirates in the Aegean Sea and was promoted to lieutenant after a number of boat actions. He returned to the Mediterranean at his new rank and saw action at the Battle of Navarino, where the British were allied with the Russians against the Ottoman forces. Lushington came to the attention of Admiral Sir Edward Codrington, the British commander in chief, and was soon promoted to his own command, that of a bomb vessel. He distinguished himself while supporting French operations in the Morea expedition, and received French and Greek honours for his part in attack on an Ottoman position, as well as the professional approbation of the French naval commander.

Though promoted to post captain, Lushington went on to spend ten years without a ship. Returning to service in 1839, he went out to the West Indies, but had to return home due to illness. He went on to command more ships in the Mediterranean, and was there when the Crimean War broke out. Operating this time against the Russians and in alliance with the Ottomans, Lushington took command of the naval brigade and won further honours. He was promoted to flag rank and received honours from the French and Ottomans, as well as from the British government. He rose to admiral during his last years, served as lieutenant-governor of Greenwich Hospital, and died in 1877 a Knight Grand Cross of the Bath and with a collection of foreign honours.

== Background and early life ==
Stephen Lushington was born on 12 December 1803, the second son of Sir Henry Lushington, 2nd Baronet, and his wife, Fanny Maria. Fanny was the eldest daughter of Matthew Lewis, under-secretary at war. Stephen's uncle was Dr Stephen Lushington, a renowned legal expert, judge and member of parliament. The younger Stephen Lushington embarked on a naval career, joining the 36-gun HMS Tagus on 17 October 1816 under Captain James Whitley Deans Dundas. He was initially stationed in the Mediterranean, though in spring 1817 he transferred to the 26-gun HMS Ganymede under Captain the Hon. Robert Cavendish Spencer, serving as a midshipman, and then went out to South America. Lushington followed Spencer to his next command, the 36-gun HMS Owen Glendower from August 1819, and remained aboard her until 1821. He returned to the Mediterranean after this period of service, and joined the 20-gun HMS Hind under Captain the Hon. Henry John Rous.

Lushington was particularly active in the cruises against pirates in the Aegean Sea, and took part in a number of boat actions, that saw him promoted to lieutenant on 13 July 1824. His promotion was followed by an appointment to the 18-gun sloop HMS Zebra under Commander Edward Richard Williams on 5 February 1825. Zebra was at this time fitting out for the Mediterranean, and sometime after his arrival there, on 7 December 1825, he transferred to the 48-gun HMS Cambrian under Captain Gawen William Hamilton. He was still with Cambrian in 1827, and saw action at the Battle of Navarino on 20 October 1827. His service, including continued action with pirates while with Cambrian, brought him to Admiral Sir Edward Codrington's attention. Four days after Navarino Codrington arranged for him to be transferred into his flagship, the 84-gun HMS Asia.^{[a]} He served on the flagship until his promotion to his first command, the bomb vessel HMS Aetna on 13 May 1828.

== Command ==
Lushington supported the Morea expedition during 1828, and was part of a squadron under Captain Edmund Lyons aboard HMS Blonde working with the French fleet under Vice-Admiral Henri de Rigny. Lushington played a distinguished part in the attack and capture of the Kastro Morea on 30 October 1828. The French force, consisting of de Rigny's flagship, the 80-gun Conquérant, and three frigates, the Duchesse de Berri, Didon and Armide were supporting a land assault by Generals Nicolas Joseph Maison and Antoine Virgile Schneider. Vice-Admiral Pulteney Malcolm forwarded Rigny's letter to the Admiralty, noting that it showed Lushington's "exertions and skill." Rigny himself wrote "Je me plais à reconnaître le active, et cordiale assistance, que vous ainsi que les officiers et marines sous vos ordres, nous ont donnée, soit avant, soit depuis mon arrivée ici, et particulièrement, dans le journée, d'hier, ou les cannons de la Blonde, et le service de la bombarde du Capitaine Lushington, ont tant contribué à abréger le resistance du chateau de Morée."^{[b]}

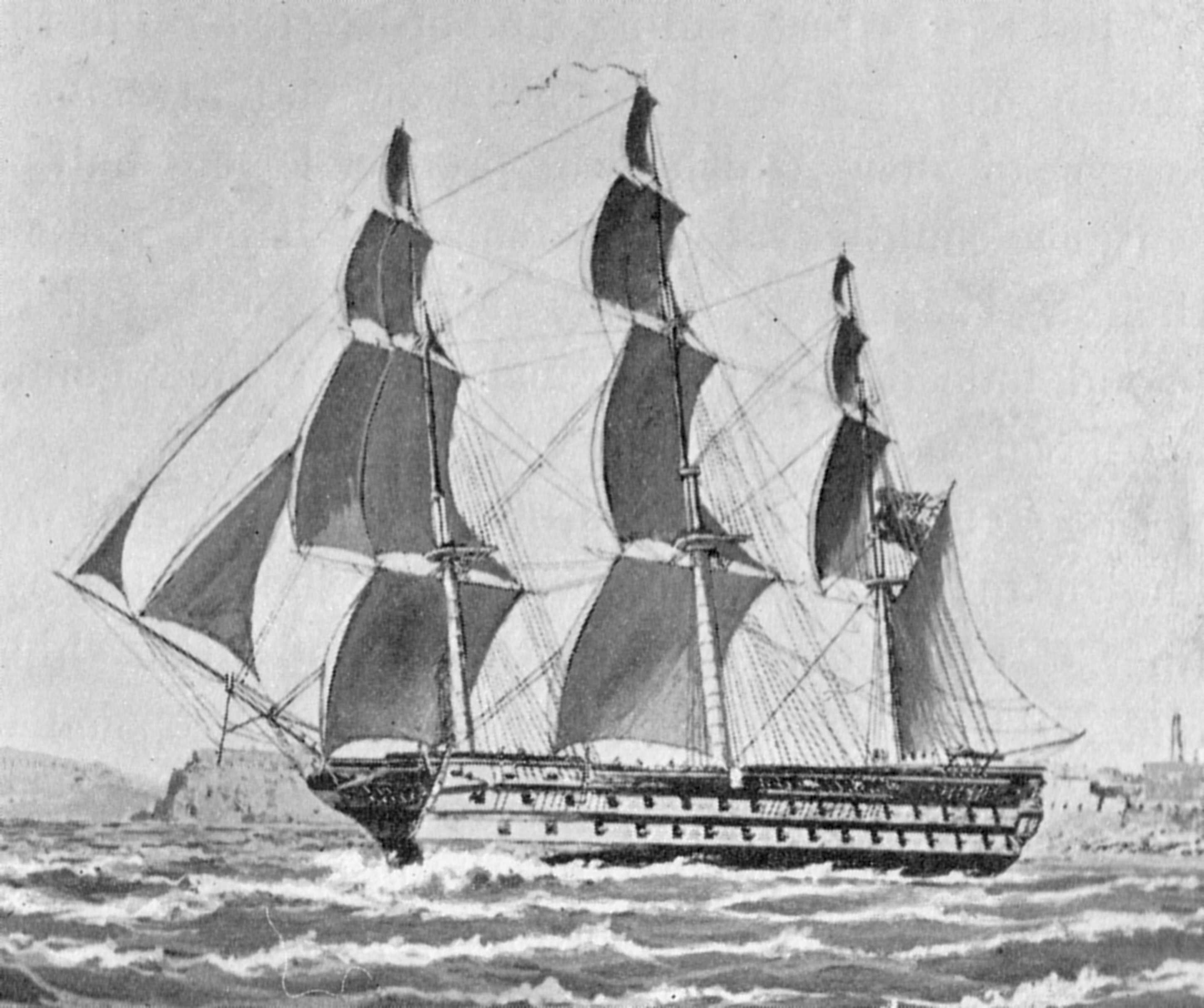
HMS Vengeance, Lushington's command from 1847 until 1848

For their services both Lushington and Lyons were nominated as Chevaliers of the Order of Saint Louis by the French, and appointed to the Order of the Redeemer by the Greeks. Lushington's promotion to post captain did not come for some time though – he was finally posted on 28 October 1829. A long period of unemployment followed, he was ashore for nearly ten years before finally appointed to take command of the 26-gun HMS Cleopatra on 19 January 1839, and sail her to the West Indies. He became ill while on this station, and after a long period of ill-health, was invalided back to Britain in November 1840 on the orders of the station commander, Sir Thomas Harvey. Lushington's health presumably recovered while in England, and on 11 October 1845 he took command of the paddle frigate HMS Retribution. He commanded her in home waters until 1846, and then took over the 84-gun HMS Vengeance in 1847. He took Vengeance out to the Mediterranean, and left her in November 1848 to take up the post of superintendent of the Indian Navy, which he held until 1852. He went to sea again in July 1852 as captain of the 90-gun HMS Albion, sailing out to the Mediterranean, and was still there when the Crimean War broke out in 1854.

== Crimea and flag rank ==
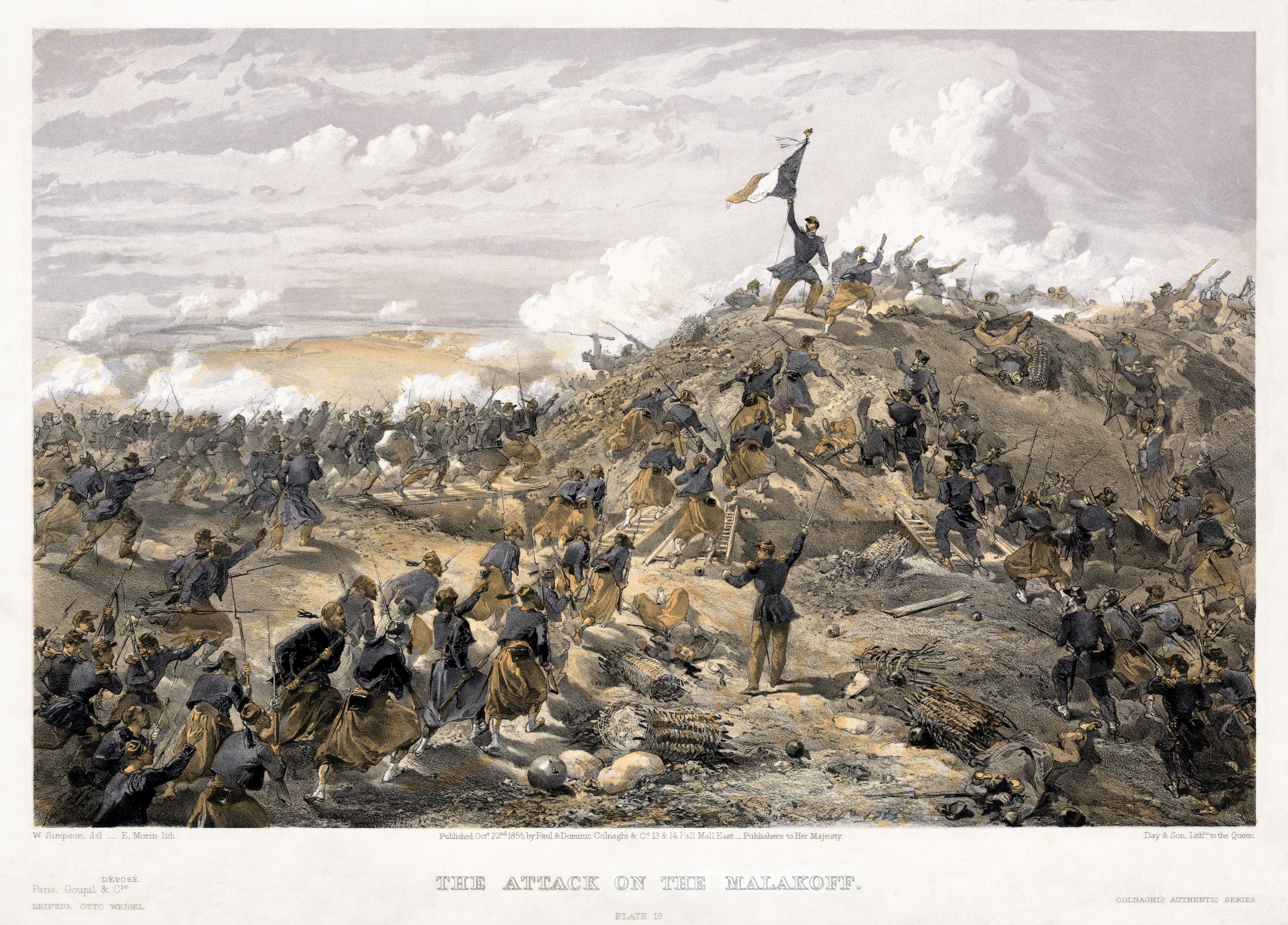
The Attack on the Malakoff, October 1855, by William Simpson. Lushington commanded the naval brigade ashore during operations to capture Sevastopol.

Lushington sailed into the Black Sea with the rest of the allied fleet and joined the forces laying siege to Sevastopol. He went ashore in command of the naval brigade and distinguished himself in the actions which followed. During his time in the Crimea he met and became friends with Frances "Fanny" Duberly, arranging for a hut to be built for her to allow her to live on shore. Fanny Duberly recorded of Lushington that "I like him because he is clever, energetic & resolute and I am not afraid of him when he chooses to say disagreeable personalities which he sometimes likes to do to shew off his sharpness." Lushington for his part teased her by calling her "wilful and wayward".

Lushington was promoted to rear-admiral on 4 July 1855, and the following day was nominated a Knight Commander of the Bath, an Officier and Commandeur of the Legion of Honour by France, and decorated with the Order of the Medjidie, Second Class, by the Ottoman Empire. On his departure from the Crimea Fanny Duberly noted that he was returning "laden with honours to England. And what well-deserved honours they are, and must be, for this reason, that not one man out in the campaign has made an observation implying that his distinctions were cheaply earned, or that he had been rewarded above his merit; and as such observations are very rife in the camp on like occasions, I think that their absence now is the surest sign that 'his honours do become him well." Lushington was succeeded in command of the naval brigade by Captain the Hon. Henry Keppel, of HMS St Jean d'Acre. He went on to be Commander-in-Chief, South East Coast of America Station in 1858.

Lushington does not appear to have had further active service, but was lieutenant-governor of Greenwich Hospital between 1862 and 1865, an appointment that denied him further promotions. When he relinquished the post, he was at once promoted to vice-admiral on 1 October 1865, with his seniority backdated to when he first took it up, between April and October 1862. A further promotion followed, to full admiral on 2 December 1865, and on 13 March 1867 he was nominated a Knight Grand Cross of the Bath.

== Family ==
Lushington married on 5 July 1841 Henrietta Prescott, the eldest daughter of Rear-Admiral Henry Prescott, and the couple left children, including:

- Henrietta Lushington, who died in Southsea on 15 December 1902, aged 60.

Lady Lushington died in 1875, and Admiral Sir Stephen Lushington died two years later, on 28 May 1877 at Oak Lodge, Thornton Heath, Surrey.

== Notes ==
a. John Marshall's Royal Naval Biography has the transfer taking place "Four days after the battle...", i.e. 24 October, while William Richard O'Byrne's Naval Biographical Dictionary also states it took place on 24 October. John Knox Laughton in the Dictionary of National Biography instead states that it took place "Three days [after the battle]".

b. Translated as "I would like to recognize the active and cordial support you and the officers and marines under your command have given us, either before or since my arrival here, particularly in the day, yesterday, the cannons of the Blonde and the service of the bomb of Captain Lushington, have both contributed to shorten the resistance of the castle of Moree."

== Citations ==
Military offices
Preceded by Provo Wallis	Commander-in-Chief, South East Coast of America Station; 1858–1860	Succeeded by Henry Keppel
