= HMS Reynard (1848) =

Sloop of the Royal Navy

Coordinates: 20°36′38″N 116°51′48″E

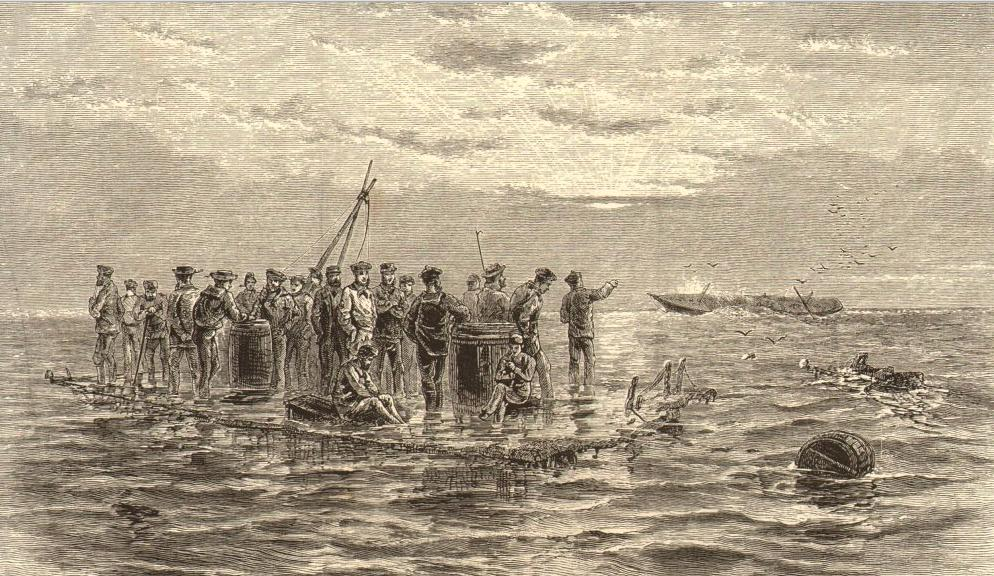
- The ship's company of Reynard on a raft, with the ship aground behind them near Pratas Island in 1851

History

United Kingdom
- Name: HMS Reynard
- Ordered: 25 April 1847; Re-ordered 12 August 1847
- Builder: Deptford dockyard
- Cost: £10,262 (hull); £8,625 (machinery and fitting)
- Laid down: August 1847
- Launched: 21 March 1848
- Commissioned: 4 July 1848
- Fate: Wrecked 31 May 1851

General characteristics
- Type: Screw sloop
- Displacement: 656 tons
- Tons burthen: 516 37/94 bm
- Length: 147 ft 0 in (44.8 m) gundeck; 128 ft 4 1/2 in (39.1 m) keel for tonnage
- Beam: 27 ft 10 in (8.5 m) maximum, 27 ft 6 in (8.4 m) for tonnage
- Draught: 11 ft 6 in (3.5 m) mean
- Depth of hold: 14 ft 6 in (4.4 m)
- Installed power: 60 nominal horsepower; 165 ihp (123 kW)
- Propulsion: 2-cylinder horizontal single-expansion steam engine; Single screw
- Speed: 8.2 kn (15.2 km/h) under power
- Complement: 100
- Armament: 8 guns: 2 × 32-pdr (56cwt) muzzle-loading smooth-bore guns; 6 × 32-pdr (25cwt) muzzle-loading smooth-bore guns

HMS Reynard was part of the 1847 Program, she was ordered on 25 April as a steam schooner from Deptford Dockyard with the name 'Plumper'. The vessel was reordered on 12 August as an 8-gun sloop as designed by John Edye. She was launched in 1848, conducted anti-piracy work in Chinese waters and was wrecked near Pratas Island in the South China Sea on 31 May 1851.

Reynard was the seventh named vessel (spelt Renard or Reynard) since it was introduced for a 18-gun sloop captured from the French in May 1780 by HMS Brune in the West Indies and broken in 1784.

== Construction ==
Reynard's keel was laid in August 1847 at Deptford Dockyard and launched on 21 March 1848. Her gundeck was 147 ft 0 in (44.8 m) with her keel length reported for tonnage calculation of 128 ft 4.5 in (39.1 m). Her maximum breadth was 27 ft 10 in (8.5 m) reported for tonnage was 27 ft 6 in (8.4 m). She had a depth of hold of 14 feet 6 inches 14 ft 6 in (4.4 m). Her builder's measure tonnage was 516 tons and displaced 656 tons. Her light draught forward was 10 ft 1.5 in (3.1 m) and 11 ft 8 in (3.6 m) aft.

Her machinery was supplied by George & John Rennie. She shipped two rectangular fire tube boilers. Her engine was a 2-cylinder horizontal single expansion (HSE) steam engine with cylinders of 28 in (711.2 mm) in diameter with a 24 in (609.6 mm) stroke, rated at 60 nominal horsepower (NHP). She had a single 8 ft 3 in (2.5 m) screw propeller.

Her main armament consisted of two Blomefield 32-pounder 56 hundredweight (cwt) muzzle loading smooth bore (MLSB) 9 ft 6 in (2.9 m) solid shot guns and six Blomefield (bored up from 18-pounders) 32-pounder 25 cwt MLSB 6-foot 6 ft 0 in (1.8 m) solid shot guns on broadside trucks. The 56 cwt guns had a 6.41 inch bore whereas the 25 cwt guns had a bore of 6.3. Both fired a 32-pound solid shot.

=== Trials ===
During steam trials her engine generated 165 indicated horsepower (IHP) for a speed of 8.238 knots.

Reynard was completed for sea on 1 August 1848 at a cost for hull £10,262 and machinery and fitting £8,625.

== Commissioned Service ==
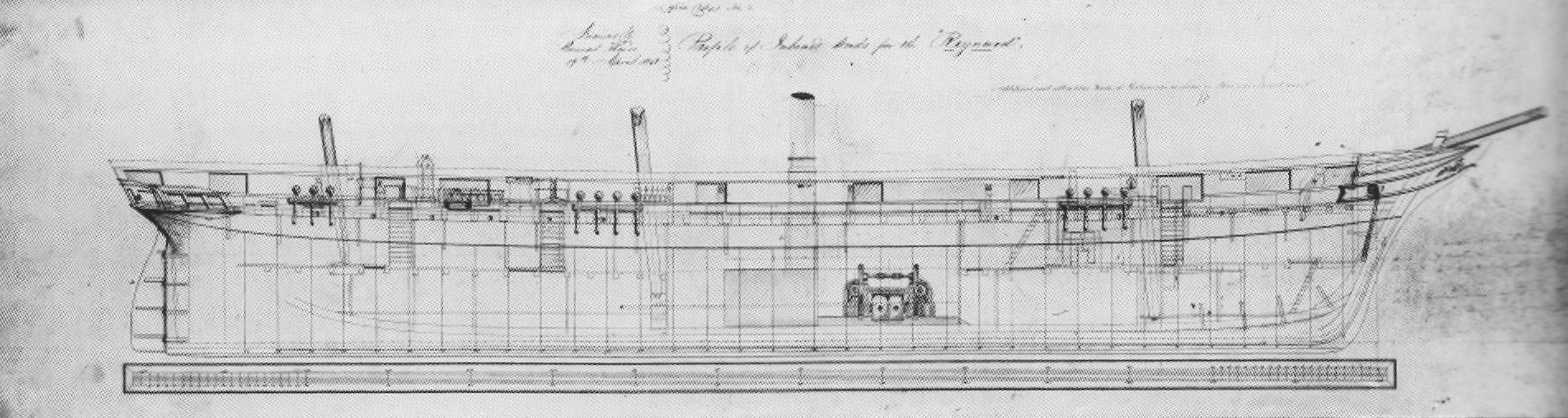
The original plans of Reynard

She was commissioned on 4 July 1848 at Woolwich under Commander Peter Cracroft, RN for Particular Service with Sir Charles Napier's Western Squadron. On 15 September 1848, she ran aground at Cobh, County Cork. She was refloated. Reynard took part in an abortive amphibious landing against Riff pirates in February 1849.

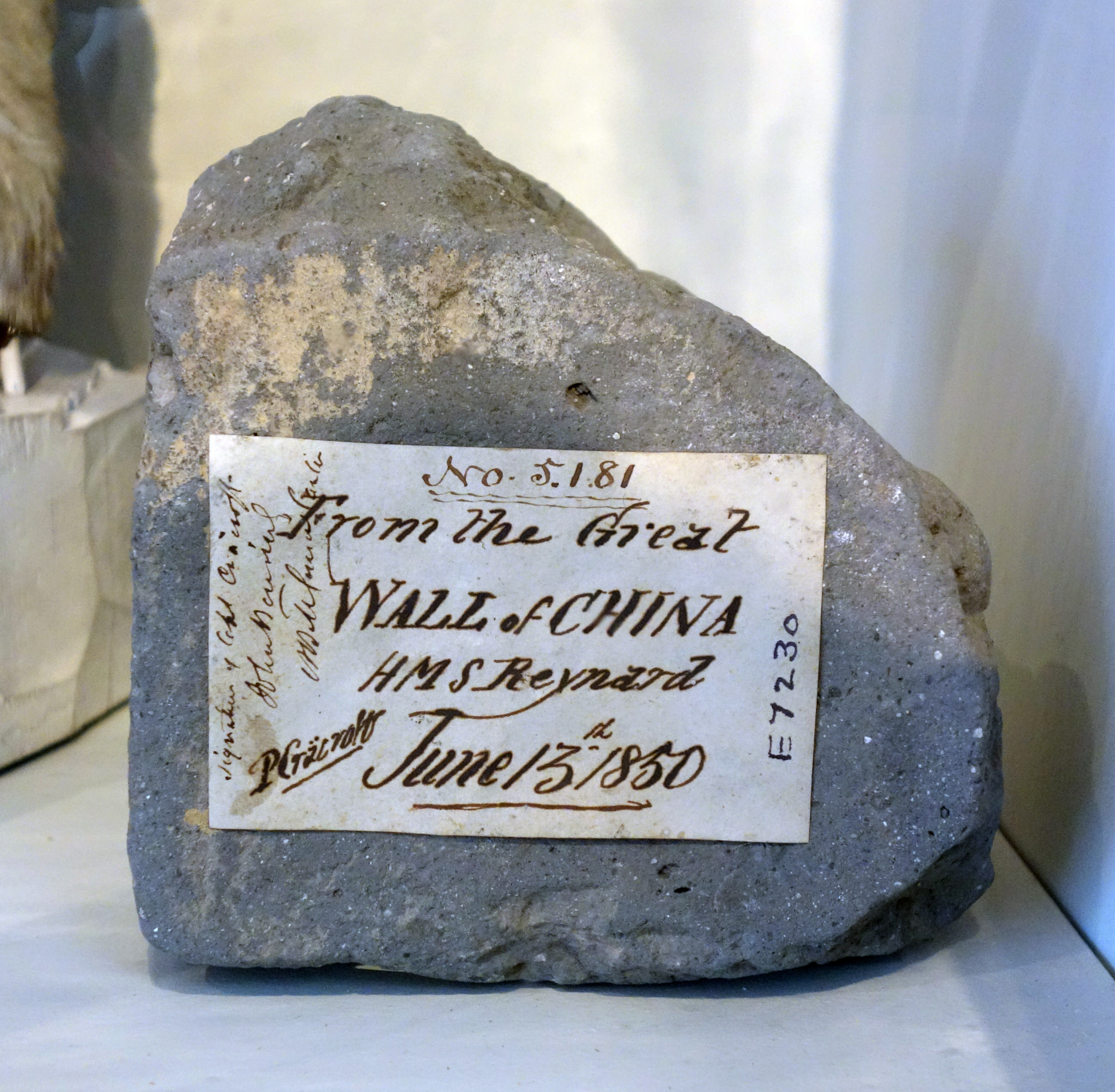
Fragment of brick from the Great Wall of China, collected by Captain Peter Cracroft of the Reynard in 1850

On leaving the Channel Fleet. she sailed for the East Indies, leaving Singapore in company with HMS Cleopatra for Labuan and China on 10 October 1849, and arriving in Hong Kong on 14 November. She served on the China Station in an anti-piracy role, recapturing two junks and apprehending 15 Chinese pirates on 23 March 1850. She left Hong Kong to return to Woolwich to pay off, but on her way was required to accompany the brig HMS Pilot to rescue the crew of the brig Velocipede, which had run aground on Pratas shoal, 170 miles (150 nautical miles; 270 kilometres) southeast of Hong Kong.

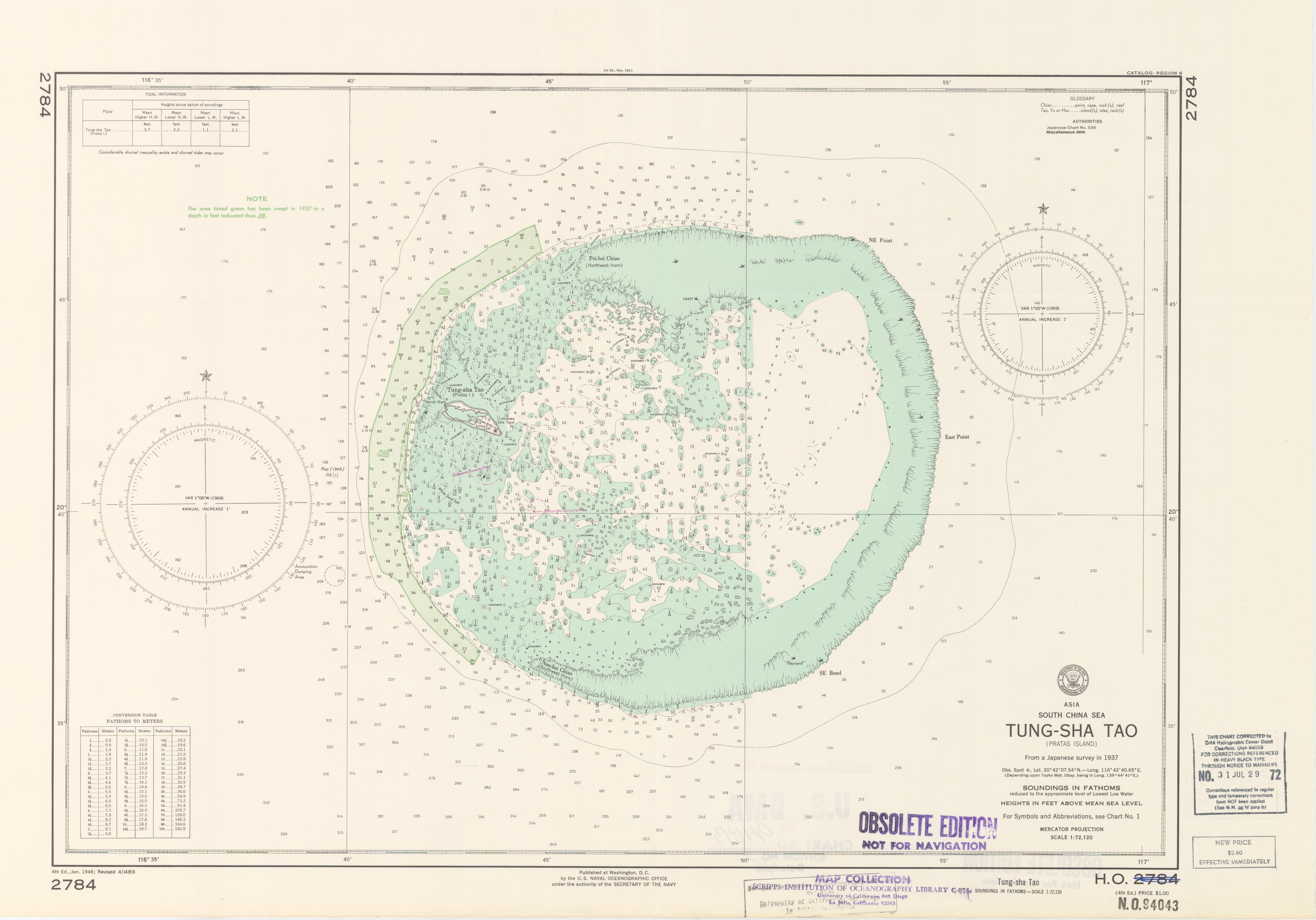
Map of Tung-sha Tao (Pratas Island) showing the location of the wreck of HMS Reynard near the SE Bend (NAVOCEANO, 1969)

== Fate ==
In rescuing the crew of Velocipede, Reynard herself was wrecked near Pratas Island in the South China Sea on 31 May 1851. The whole crew survived the sinking. HMS Pilot rescued them and also the crew of Velocipede. Reynard could not be saved, and she was paid off as a total loss on 27 February 1852.
