= HMS Cleopatra (1835) =

Frigate of the Royal Navy

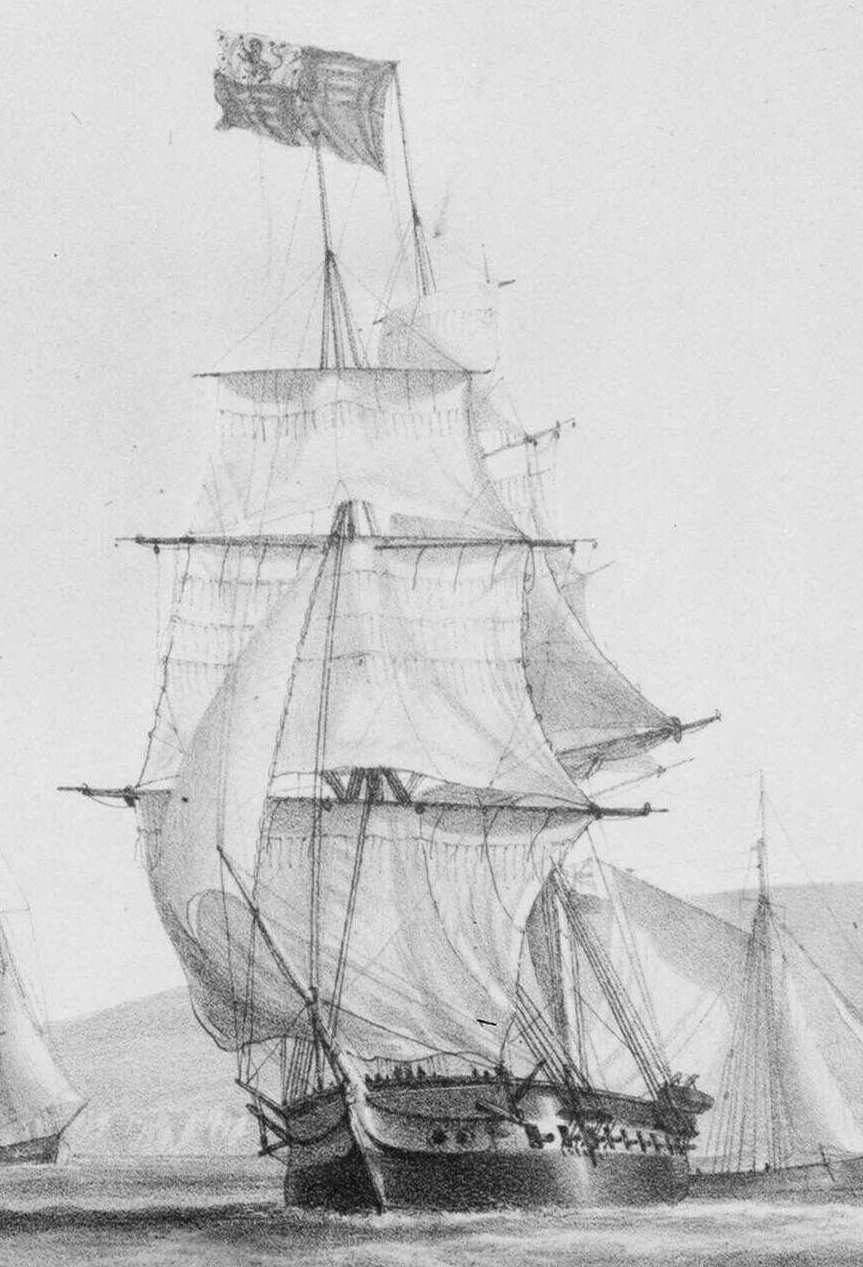
- Sister ship – HMS Vestal

History

United Kingdom
- Name: HMS Cleopatra
- Namesake: Cleopatra VII
- Ordered: 28 March 1832
- Builder: Pembroke Dockyard
- Laid down: June 1832
- Launched: 28 April 1835
- Completed: By 13 September 1835
- Reclassified: Accommodation ship between 1857–1858
- Fate: Ordered to be sold for breaking up on 17 February 1862

General characteristics
- Class & type: 26-gun Vestal-class sixth-rate frigate
- Tons burthen: 911 75/94 bm
- Length: 130 ft (39.6 m) (overall); 104 ft 6 in (31.9 m) (keel)
- Beam: 40 ft 6 in (12.3 m)
- Depth of hold: 10 ft 6 in (3.20 m)
- Sail plan: Full-rigged ship
- Complement: 240
- Armament: 18 × 32-pdrs; Quarterdeck: 6 × 32-pdr gunnades; Forecastle: 4 × 32-pdr gunnades

HMS Cleopatra was a 26-gun Vestal-class sixth-rate frigate of the Royal Navy. She was built at Pembroke Dock and launched on 28 April 1835. She was to have been launched in July 1834 and fitted thereafter. Her complement was 152 officers and men, 33 boys, and 25 marines. She was broken up in February 1862.

Cleopatra was the second of three Vestal-class ships built between 1833 and 1836. The first was HMS Vestal and the third HMS Carysfort. She was acknowledged as a good handling fast boat during her early voyages.

== Voyages ==
=== Russia ===
Captain George Grey, the fourth son of Earl Charles Grey, took command of the vessel on 12 August 1835 first sailing to Saint Petersburg, Russia with his sister Lady Louisa, the wife of John Lambton, 1st Earl of Durham and British Ambassador to Russia at the time. On 19 September, while sailing to St Petersburg, Cleopatra ran aground for several hours on a point of land near Læsø in the Baltic. In order to refloat the ship chains, several cannons, and other objects were offloaded onto the Dutch ship Ypres. She called into Elsinore to check for damage on the 22nd before proceeding on to St Petersburg. A subsequent court-martial into the grounding cleared the captain and crew of any negligence.

Cleopatra set sail for England from St Petersburg on 15 October 1835 arriving at Flamborough Head on 25th. The following day at 5pm, in a South Westerly gale, she came across the brig Fisher which had been demasted and was sinking. The brig was about 82 miles South East of Flamborough Head. There were several men on the deck but despite all the efforts of Cleopatra's crew they could not either get a line to her or a boat. The sea was extremely rough and the boat they tried to launch was swamped. Those on board were injured, several severely. By 6:40pm all they could do was hoist a light and wait. To the distress of Cleopatra the brig sank shortly afterwards and none of the sailors on board were saved. She then sailed to Sheerness for repairs.

After being repaired she sailed to Spithead on 28 November 1835 where she was to sail from to South America. Her purpose was to transport boys and marines as supernumeraries for other vessels on the South American station. She left Spithead on 30 November 1835 for Rio de Janeiro, passing Plymouth on 1 December.

Cleopatra made a return journey to St Petersburg in October 1838 taking the new British Ambassador Ulick de Burgh, 1st Marquess of Clanricarde.

=== North America and West Indies Station ===
By 20 January 1836 she was at Rio de Janeiro. While there she was challenged to a race by a French Navy brig of war L'Ariane. Cleopatra won the race. She left there on 2 March for St Catherine. On 23 August she was in Buenos Aires. In April 1839, while back in England command was passed to Captain Stephen Lushington.

On 11 May 1839 she was at Halifax and on 23 November was at Bermuda preparing to sail for Jamaica in the West Indies. Once there, on 3 January 1840, she intercepted and detained the Portuguese slave vessel Louisa, which had 283 slaves on board. A month later, on 23 February, she intercepted, boarded, and inspected the papers of the Spanish vessel Iberia. During the search a sealed envelope of the Custom House clearance register was opened to verify that the ship was not a slaver. This created an international incident sparking an exchange of letters between the British and Spanish governments.

On 2 June 1840 she left Jamaica for Bermuda. By 6 October she had been to Quebec and was at Newfoundland. While in port at Quebec a Cleopatra seaman, Robert Collins, killed the ship's Sergeant of Marines. Collins was tried and executed by hanging from the fore yardarm. This was apparently the first shipboard execution at Quebec and the third navy execution since 1812. The newspaper remarked that the case was unusual in that none of Collins's shipmates spoke up in favour of his character or general conduct. The norm was that at least one would make a statement on the accused's behalf, regardless of the likely outcome of the trial. She returned to Bermuda by 26 October.

Lushington had fallen severely ill in early 1840 and after nine months of prolonged illness was invalided out on 9 November. He was replaced by Captain Alexander Milne in November. On 16 December she was at Barbados, having been cruising off Puerto Rico. By the 26th she was at St Thomas' and left on the 29th.

On 27 January 1841, off St Thomas, she detained another slave ship, the Spanish schooner Segunda Rosario, with 288 slaves on board. During 1841 she was at Jamaica on 3 March, and Halifax on 10 April and 18 October. On 1 August she detained a slave brig, which was sent for adjudication to the Vice-Admiralty Court at British Guiana. Captain Christopher Wyvill had taken command at some point through this period, Milne having relinquished command in March.

In April 1842 she returned to England to be paid off and recommissioned. Wyvill was reappointed captain.

=== Africa ===
On 25 July she sailed for Mauritius, taking its governor, Major-General Sir William Gumm, and his suite. Cleopatra was to have gone to serve in the East Indies but was reassigned to the Cape of Good Hope.

By 12 April 1843 she was in the Mozambique Channel and detained the slave brigantine Progresso under Captain Antonio R Chaves, with 447 slaves on board. By the time she reached Simon's Town only 222 had survived despite being assisted by the crew of Cleopatra, such was the impact of their captivity prior to their rescue. Cleopatra detained the slave vessel Defensivo on 11 July and both Silveira and Atilla on 29 November. They were detained between Quelimane and Luabo (near Chinde), in the mouth of the Zambesi.

On 21 March 1844 she was off the coast of Madagascar and anchored about 96 miles (154 km) north of St Augustin's Bay. Two days later, on 23 March there was an incident when two natives were turned out of the boat for stealing stores. In retaliation the natives threw a spear, killing Lieutenant Molesworth. A fight ensued and seven more crew members were killed and three wounded. Later that year she detained the slave vessel Mars on 4 July, Isabel on 5 July, and the a slave brig on 13 December. These were followed on 16 March 1845 by the slave vessel Paquette de Monte Video.

In August 1845 Cleopatra began a survey of the attitudes held by the kings and governors of coastal East Africa north of Simon's Town, and from consuls regarding how they saw trade in general progressing. She reached Zanzibar on 13 September and was on the Quelimane Coast by the end of October. She was joined on 14 November by HMS Sappho off the mouth of the Quelimane River. There was considerable evidence of the slave trade, with support for it from tribal chiefs in the region and visiting ships trading for them. Cleopatra then sailed on to Johanna, finally returning to Simon's Town Bay on 14 Jan 1846. She had also visited Mayotta and Nos-beh on the journey. After caulking and resupplying she resumed her patrols.

==== Lucy Penniman ====
On 18 May 1846 Cleopatra anchored near the Angozha River, Mozambique. Using the ship's boats they rowed up the river and found an American barque, Lucy Penniman of New York, which had sailed there from Rio de Janeiro under her master, Matthew Cooper. The crew advised Cleopatra that they had been tricked into becoming a part of her crew and that she was intended for the slave trade. Nearby was the Brazilian brig Kentucky, which was on fire. Lucy Penniman's crew wanted help as they expected Kentucky's 30-strong Portuguese crew to try to take their boat.

Cooper had earlier landed on shore by the ships boats to contact the Portuguese. When the boats returned two hours later to pick him up it was ambushed by a large number of Arabs and natives. The boats held their position, about 40 yards (37 m) off shore, and returned the fire using the boats' guns and muskets. Four of the crew were wounded, one severely and the captain was missing. Lucy Penniman was first moved to near Cleopatra, then sent to Simon's Town, arriving on 4 July. Lucy Penniman's crew were named as: Thomas F. Martin, first mate; James Oney, carpenter; James A Robertson; Andrew McBroom; Louis Cornides; and George Washington Smith. The crew were sent to Cape Town.

Cleopatra continued her anti-slavery patrols, detaining Constante on 12 July and Improviso on 12 November.

=== England ===
In January 1847 she sailed for England arriving there on 16 March. She had had a severe dysentery outbreak among the crew with two dying on the way back from Zanzibar to Simon's Town and 40 on her sick list. Two more died before she departed for England. She was relieved by HMS Brilliant. When she arrived in England she was carrying Commander Gooch of HMS Sealark who was not expected to recover. Her orders were to sail to Chatham to be paid off.

She was dry docked to ascertain her condition as she had nine feet of water in her hold. Inspection revealed that her copper cladding was missing in a number of places and the underplanks completely eaten through by worms in a number of places. Surprise was expressed at her being able to return safely to England. She required an entire new keel. The total cost of repairs to make her serviceable and seaworthy again was estimated at £15,000. Repairs were completed by 17 July 1848, with the final fitting of masts and pendant being completed in 1849. Captain Thomas Lecke Massie was appointed captain on 29 April 1849. After completing crewing, loading supplies, and a short sea trial she left for Rio on 15 June.

=== East Indies and China Station ===
Cleopatra was reassigned to Singapore to take the place of HMS Maeander. She arrived in Singapore from Devonport via Rio de Janeiro under Captain Massie on 14 September 1849 and left with HMS Reynard for Labuan and China on 10 October. She arrived in Hong Kong on 14 November. On board through this period was Prince Frederick William of Hesse, heir to the Danish throne, who was training as a midshipman. The Singapore paper mistakenly described the prince as the son of the Danish king but the king had no sons.

In February 1850, she sailed from Hong Kong to Bombay, arriving on 28 March. She returned to Singapore on 4 May via Colombo. She then sailed for Penang on the 16th visiting Malacca on the 18th. By the 23rd she was sighted near Cape Rachado. By early September she arrived at Trincomalee. After a break she returned to sea in November, heading for Singapore and arriving there in December.

In 1851, she sailed from Singapore in the second week of February to Hong Kong. On the 20th she was involved in the capture of a group of Chinese pirates at Aberdeen. Cleopatra was still in port at Hong Kong on 24 April. She remained based there assisting in chasing pirates and sailing variously to Macau, Cumsingmoon, and Manila then East Indies on 30 August, before return to Singapore on 31 October. The crew were credited with destroying at least three pirate junks during their time in Hong Kong.

She sailed to Penang on 11 December. She returned to Singapore after passing through the Straits of Malacca on 1 January 1852.

Cleopatra was then ordered, along with Semiramis to sail to Labuan, join up with HMS Pluto, and proceed along the coast of Borneo to locate and punish the Sulu pirates responsible for taking Dolphin and killing Robert Burns, a Scottish explorer and ethnologist, and her crew members. Captain Massie was put in charge of the force. It sailed to the mouth of the Kinabatangan River. A flotilla of 15 boats was dispatched up to the pirates' base camp at Tunkup. The pirates were aware of their approach and opened fire. Before their stronghold was surrounded the pirates made good their escape and continued harassing fire. The flotilla destroyed the pirates' supplies and buildings before returning to the awaiting ships. The flotilla had lost three men in fight and three wounded. No pirates were thought to have been injured. The boats left for Singapore on 2 March.

When Cleopatra and SV Semiramis returned, the Naval Commander-in-Chief at Singapore was going to order them to call at Pulo Ubi and Hoonding in Cambodia on their way to China. These boats left Singapore on 17 March. They were to locate and apprehend the hijackers of the barque Victory. By the end of April Cleopatra was back in Hong Kong where she remained based.

In early 1853 the captain, officers, and crew had an obelisk erected in the Hong Kong cemetery to commemorate those lost on the Tunku River expedition. The ship left Hong Kong on 10 March having been relieved by HMS Spartan.

Cleopatra was ordered to Burma, arriving at Rangoon on 5 April. She remained in Burmese waters till May, participating in the Second Anglo-Burmese War and receiving battle honours.

Returning to Chatham, Massie relinquished command on 28 September 1853 and the crew were paid off. She then remained at Chatham until she was put up for sale on 9 August 1861 and dismantled in February 1862.

== Figurehead ==
The figurehead was carved by Robert Hall of Princes Stairs, Rotherhithe.

When Cleopatra was broken up, the figurehead was preserved within the Chatham collection. The figurehead was moved to the collection at HMS Ganges in the 1948 inventory.

The figurehead was transferred to the National Museum of the Royal Navy, Portsmouth in 1984 when training at HMS Ganges ceased.
