= HMS Formidable (1825) =

Ship of the line of the Royal Navy

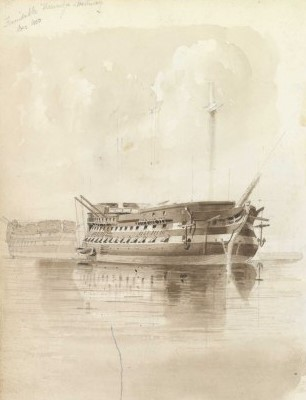
- Formidable at Sheerness in December 1850

History

United Kingdom
- Name: HMS Formidable
- Ordered: 8 May 1815
- Builder: Chatham Dockyard
- Laid down: October 1819
- Launched: 19 May 1825
- Fate: Sold, 1906

General characteristics
- Class & type: Canopus-class ship of the line
- Tons burthen: 2289 bm
- Length: 193 ft 10 in (59.08 m) (gundeck)
- Beam: 52 ft 4 1/2 in (16.0 m) (16 m)
- Depth of hold: 22 ft 6 in (6.86 m)
- Propulsion: Sails
- Sail plan: Full-rigged ship
- Armament: 84 guns: Gundeck: 28 × 32 pdrs, 2 × 68 pdr carronades; Upper gundeck: 32 × 24 pdrs; Quarterdeck: 6 × 24 pdrs, 10 × 32 pdr carronades; Forecastle: 2 × 24 pdrs, 4 × 32 pdr carronades

HMS Formidable was an 84-gun second rate of the Royal Navy, launched on 19 May 1825 at Chatham Dockyard. With a crew of 700 she was one of the Navy's largest ships at that time.

== Service ==
She was designed by Sir Robert Seppings. She was launched in May 1825 at a truly massive cost of £64,000. However, her fitting out (with guns etc.) was not completed until November 1841. Her first "true commander" (i.e. other than being moved from dock to dock) was Captain Charles Sullivan who sailed her to the Mediterranean.

On 29 November 1842, Formidable ran aground off the mouth of the Llobregat on the coast of Spain. She was refloated on 2 December 1842 with the aid of two French steamships.

In April 1844 command transferred to Captain George Frederick Rich.

In 1869 Formidable became a training ship, at the National Nautical School in Portishead, and she was sold out of the navy in 1906 to Castle's for breaking up at Charlton.

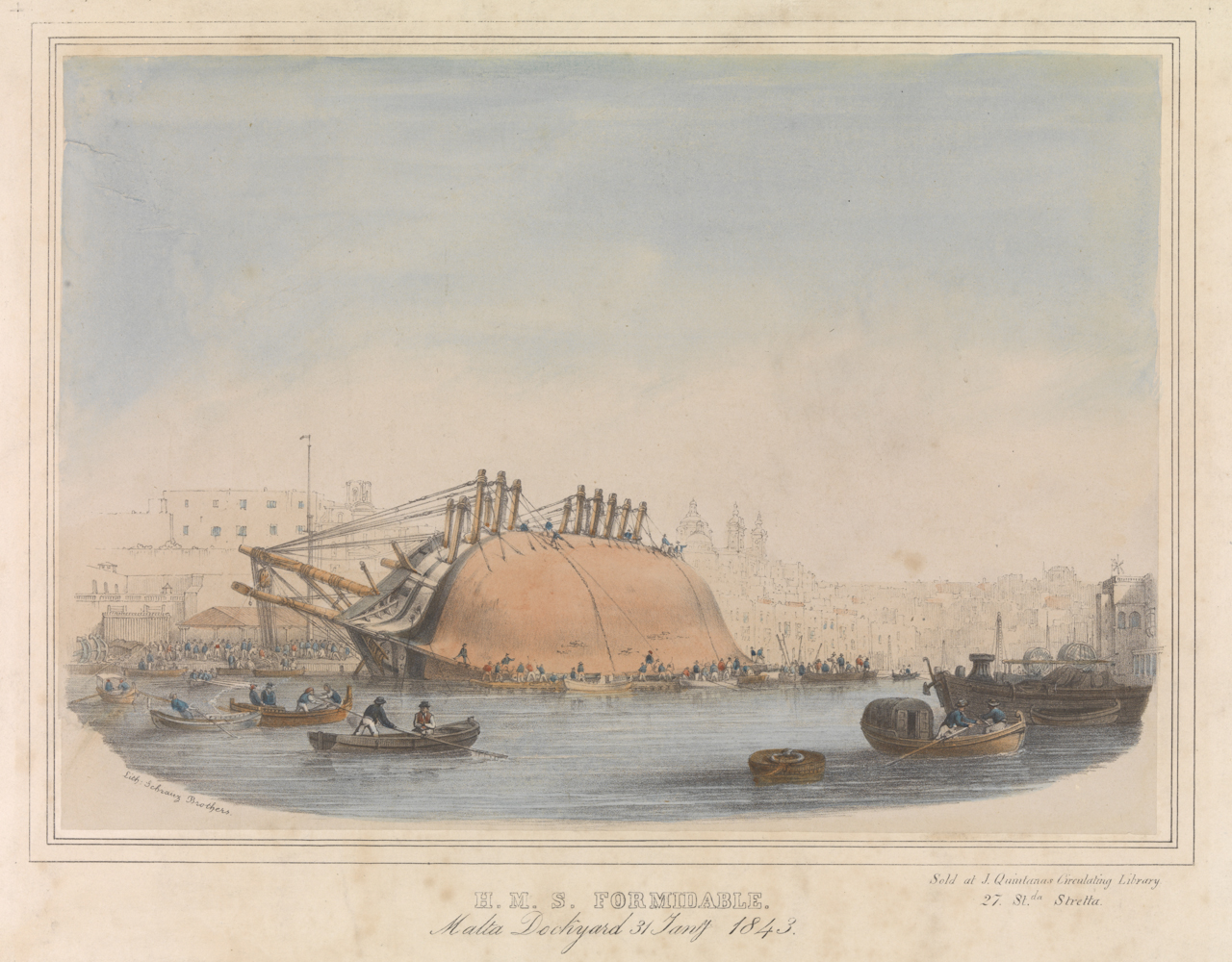
Formidable careened in Malta Dockyard on 31 January 1843

== Archives ==
Records of the National Nautical School are held at Bristol Archives (Ref. 38087) (online catalogue).
