= Canopus-class ship of the line =

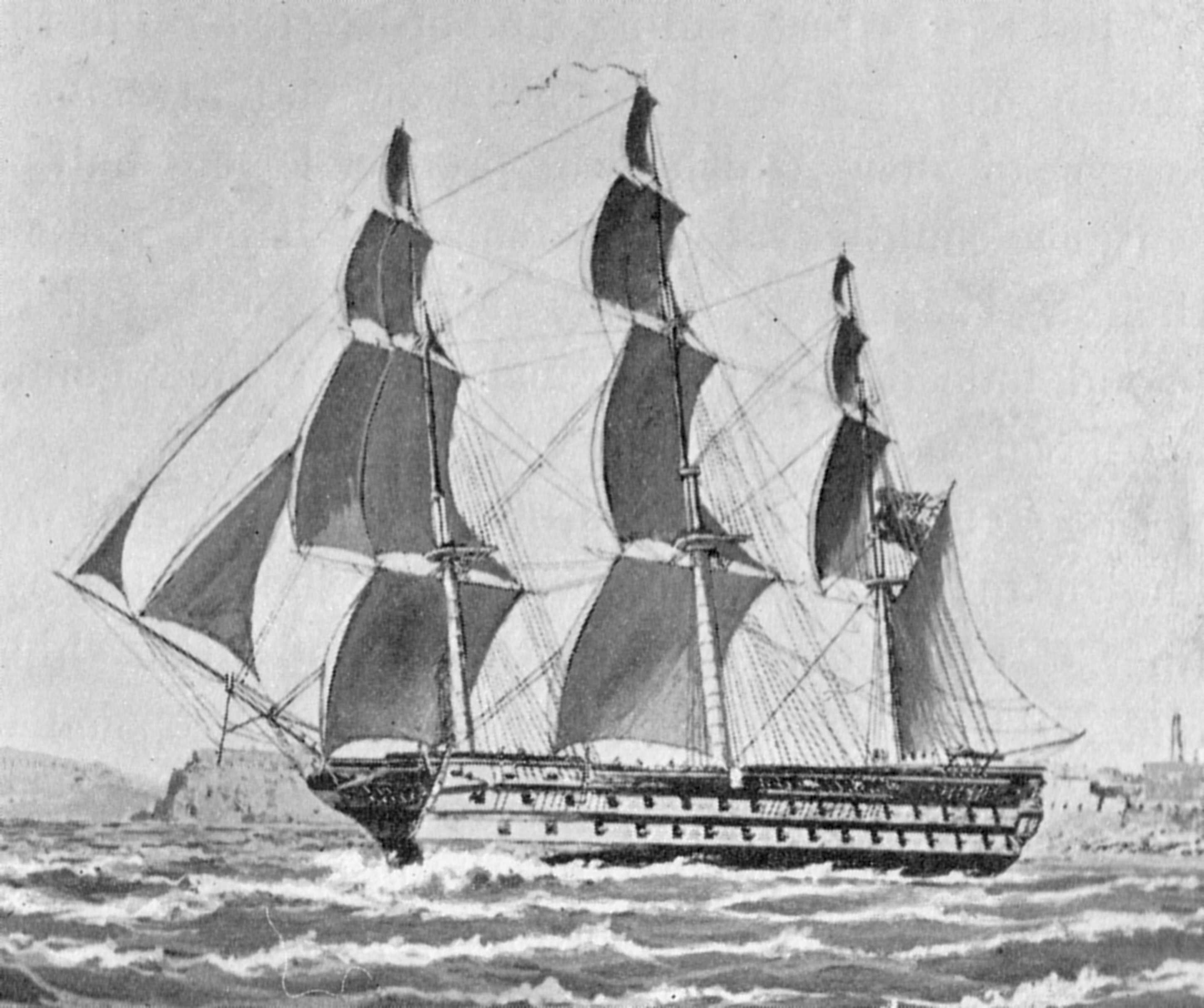
- HMS Vengeance, a Canopus-class ship of the line

Class overview
- Name: Canopus-class ship of the line
- Operators: Royal Navy
- Preceded by: None
- Succeeded by: Vanguard class
- In service: 10 November 1821 - 1929
- Completed: 9

General characteristics
- Type: Ship of the line
- Length: 193 ft 10 in (59.08 m) (gundeck); 160 ft 2 5/8 in (48.835 m) (keel)
- Beam: 52 ft 4 1/2 in (15.964 m)
- Propulsion: Sails
- Armament: 84 guns: Gundeck: 28 × 32-pounders, 2 × 68-pounder carronades; Upper gundeck: 32 × 24-pounders; Quarterdeck: 6 × 24-pounders, 10 × 32-pounder carronades; Forecastle: 2 × 24-pounders, 4 × 32-pounder carronades
- Notes: Ships in class include:

The Canopus class consisted of nine 84-gun two-deck, second rate ships of the line built for the Royal Navy: Ganges, Asia, Vengeance, Formidable, Powerful, Clarence, Bombay, Thunderer, Monarch. Their design was based on an enlarged version of the lines of the captured French ship Franklin, since commissioned in the Royal Navy as HMS Canopus, although this ship herself was not included as a member of the class. The earlier ships were initially ordered as 80-gun third rates, but this classification was altered by changes in the rating system in February 1817. These ships are sometimes referred to as the Formidable class.

== Ships ==
- HMS Formidable

Builder: Chatham Dockyard
Ordered: 8 May 1815
Launched: 19 May 1825
Fate: Sold, 1906

- HMS Ganges

Builder: Bombay Dockyard
Ordered: 4 June 1816
Launched: 10 November 1821
Fate: Sold, 1929

- HMS Asia

Builder: Bombay Dockyard
Ordered: 22 April 1819
Launched: 19 January 1824
Fate: Sold, 1908

- HMS Vengeance

Builder: Pembroke Dockyard
Ordered: 23 January 1817
Launched: 27 July 1824
Fate: Sold, 1897

- HMS Powerful

Builder: Chatham Dockyard
Ordered: 23 January 1817
Launched: 21 June 1826
Fate: Broken up, 1864

- HMS Clarence

Builder: Pembroke Dockyard
Ordered: 27 May 1819
Launched: 25 July 1827
Fate: Burnt, 1884

- HMS Bombay

Builder: Bombay Dockyard
Ordered: 26 January 1825
Launched: 17 February 1828
Fate: Burnt, 1864

- HMS Thunderer

Builder: Woolwich Dockyard
Ordered: 23 January 1817
Launched: 22 September 1831
Fate: Sold, 1901

- HMS Monarch

Builder: Chatham Dockyard
Ordered: 23 July 1817
Launched: 18 December 1832
Fate: Broken up, 1866
