= National Nautical School =

Coordinates: 51.4847°N 2.7997°W

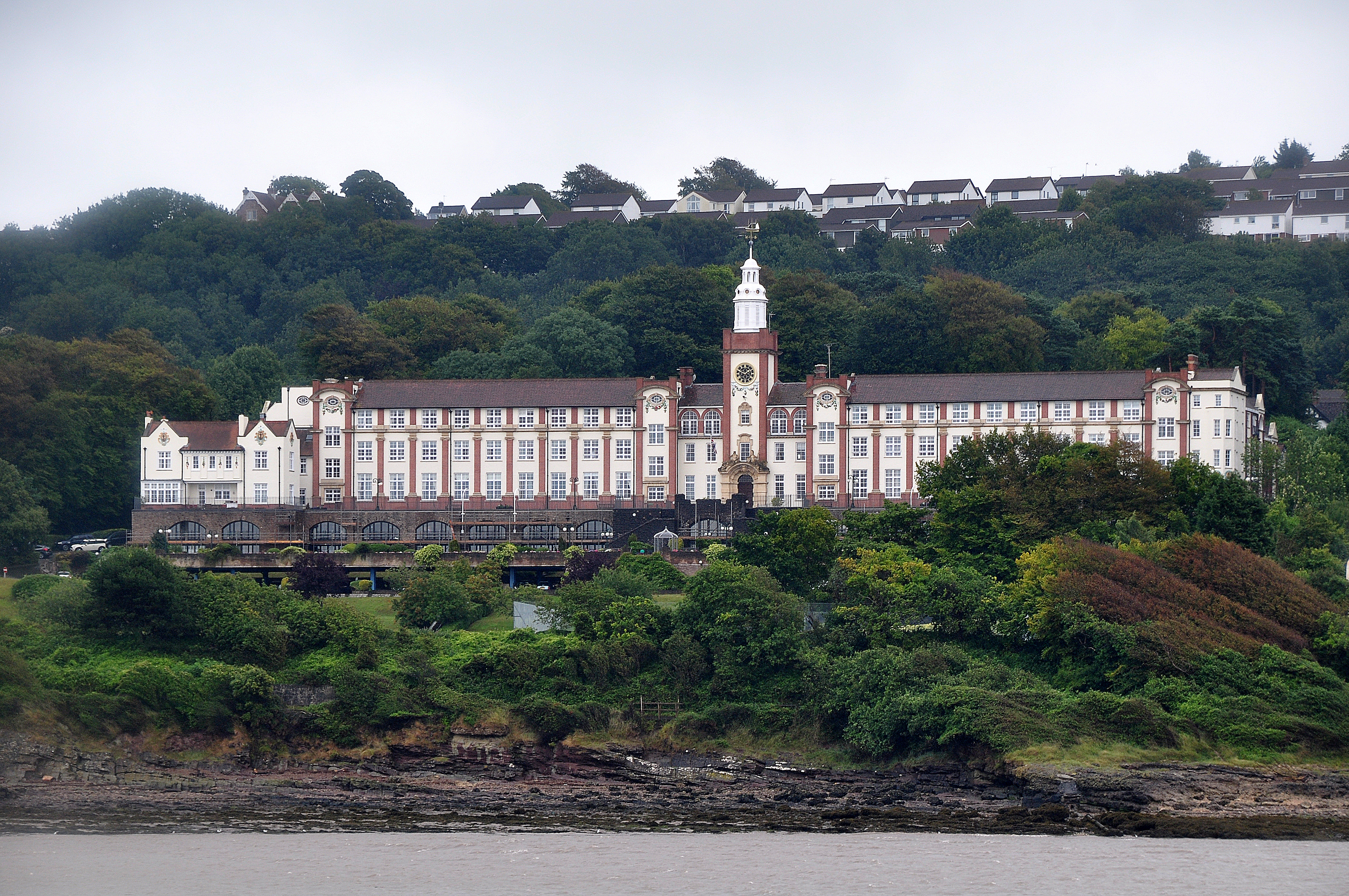
National Nautical School

The National Nautical School in Portishead, within the English county of Somerset, was created in 1869 for destitute and neglected boys of Bristol. It was based on HMS Formidable moored off the shore from 1870 until 1906. It then used a purpose built facility nearby until its closure in 1982.

== Formation ==
The National Nautical School was formed by a committee composed of several Bristol business men led by Henry Fedden as a training school for penniless boys aged between 10 and 15 from Bristol. Many of the semi-delinquent boys were sent by the courts. Fedden was chairman of the Bristol Board of Magistrates and frequently saw boys brought before the courts on charges of truancy, theft and begging.

An application was made to open the school under the Industrial Schools Act 1866 (29 & 30 Vict. c. 118). At least £2,700 was raised by voluntary contributions from local citizens. The committee were offered HMS Ajax. However, the repair bill for the ship would have been considerable, and they therefore repetitioned the navy and were eventually leased HMS Formidable.

== HMS Formidable ==
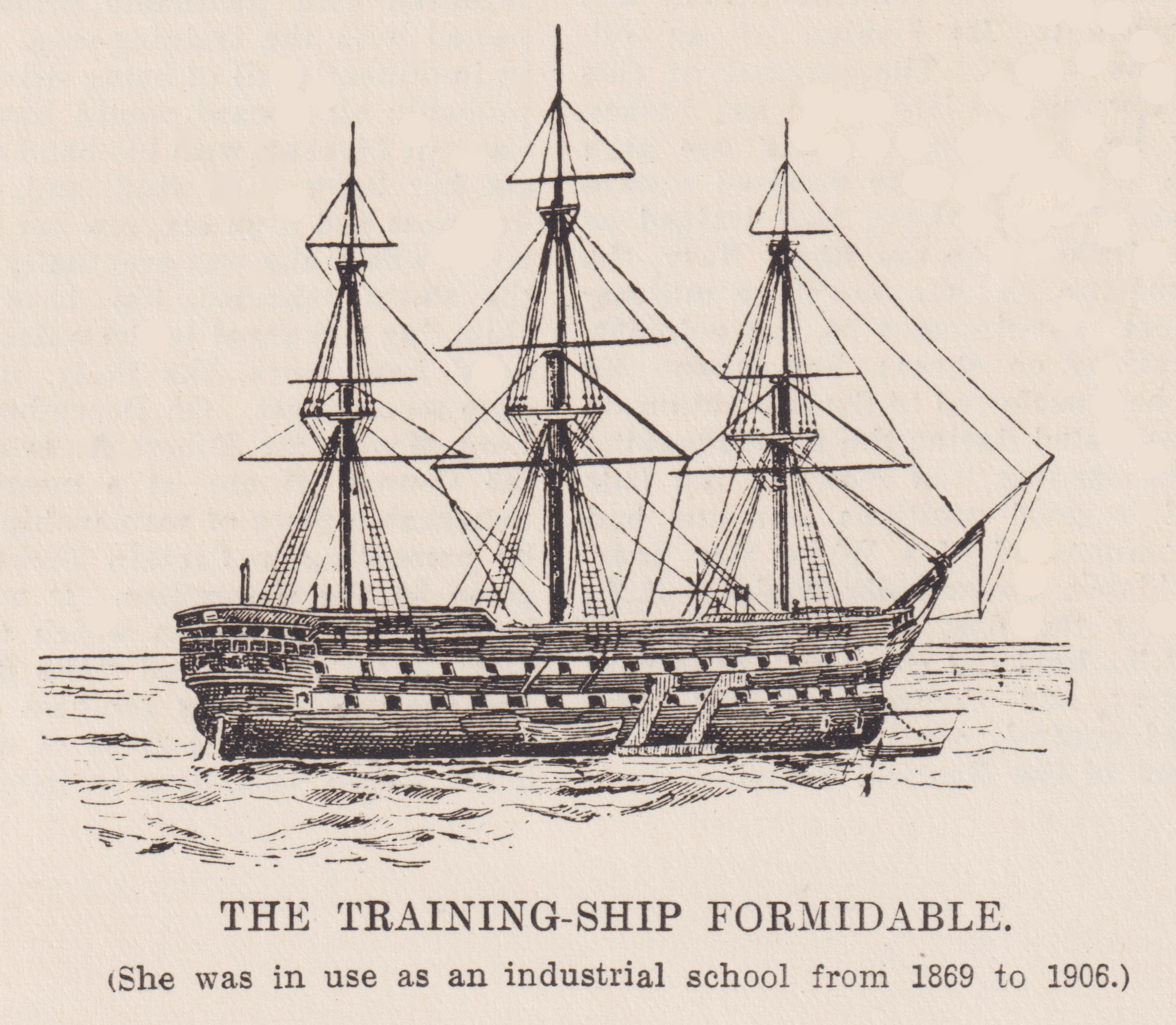
Training-Ship Formidable, 1906

HMS Formidable was launched on 19 May 1825 at Chatham Dockyard. It had been an 84-gun second rate of the Royal Navy, with ports for guns on upper, main, and lower decks, however was known as a two-decker. The deck was 230 feet (70 m) long and a breadth of beam about 55 feet (17 m).

It was leased to the Bristol Training Ship Association by the Royal Navy in 1869 and sailed from its mooring at Sheerness in Kent and moored off the pier of the Portishead Railway near the Black Nore Lighthouse. Captain Poulden, who had been in HMS Excellent at Portsmouth was appointed to the command. The Industrial School Ship for up to 350 boys was opened by Charles Kingsley.

In 1884 Poulden was replaced as the captain superintendent by Captain R.B. Nicholetts who served until 1900 when Commander Willoughby E. Still was appointed. A regime of strict discipline was imposed; however in a visit by the mayor of Bristol and local dignitaries in 1896 this was found to have been an efficient training regime. Several boys died on the ship, some from infectious diseases and others from injuries received or by falling overboard.

The ship was damaged in storms and, once the onshore building was ready, HMS Formidable was scrapped.

== Archives ==
Records of the National Nautical School, including records of the Clifton Industrial School, are held at Bristol Archives (Ref. 38087) (online catalogue).

== Onshore ==
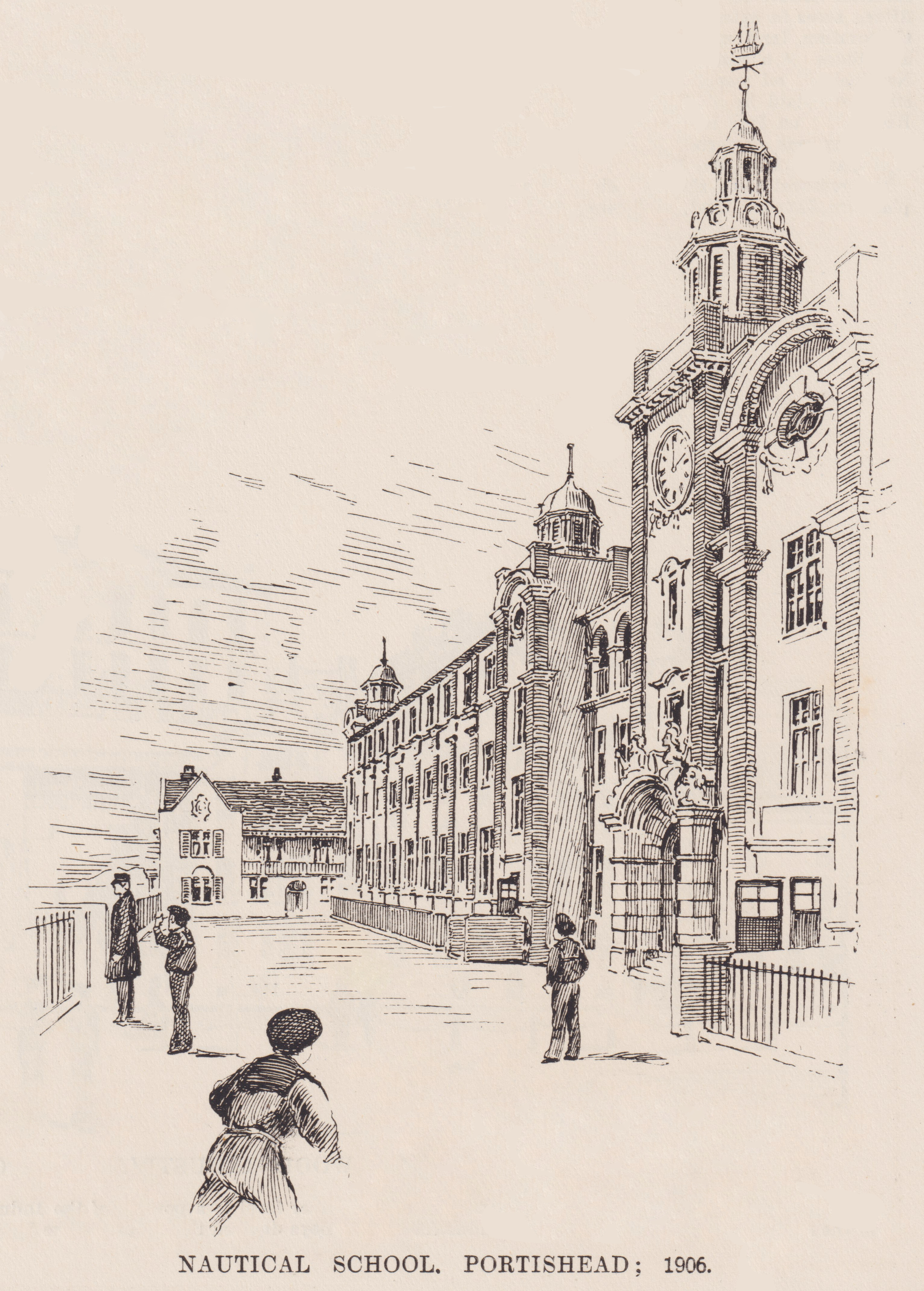
Nautical School, 1906

In 1906 an onshore building was opened by Princess Helena within a 2 acres (0.81 ha) site.

The School was built by Edward Gabriel in 1905, at a cost of £30,000. It had three storeys with four storeys in the central tower with a basement. The building was fronted with Ionic pilasters. The dormitories had wooden floors and hammocks to simulate the environment on a ship, although the hammocks were later replaced with beds. A gymnasium was also provided. The land in front of the building was used as a parade ground and then had playing fields close to a jetty and the foreshore. The mizzen-mast from the old ship was placed in the school grounds. Other timber was used to make the pulpit of the school's chapel, which was built on land donated by William Wills, 1st Baron Winterstoke.

The Clifton Certified Industrial School, which was also known as the Mardyke House School, which had been established in 1849, was amalgamated with the National Nautical School in 1924. Alterations were made to the building in 1928 with W.A. Williams as the architect.

In 1931 it was re-certified for 225 boys and from 1933 became a senior approved school. The pupils were taught seamanship and other relevant skills such as shoemaking, tailoring and carpentry. The school also had a military band. Between 1869 and 1909 over 3,500 boys were discharged from the school. 192 entered the Royal Navy however a larger number (2,312) gained employment in the Merchant Navy. The building was designated as a Grade II listed building in 1983, the year the school closed. The building is now part of a private gated community known as Fedden Village. A sculpture commemorating the school has been erected in the Port Marine development in Portishead, and another in the shape of a compass has been installed in North Weston cemetery as a memorial to those who died on the Formidable.
