= HMS Clarence (1827) =

Ship of the line of the Royal Navy

History

United Kingdom
- Name: HMS Clarence
- Ordered: 27 May 1819
- Builder: Pembroke Dockyard
- Laid down: August 1824
- Launched: 25 July 1827
- Fate: Burnt, 17 January 1884 at Liverpool

General characteristics
- Class & type: Canopus-class ship of the line
- Tons burthen: 2288 bm
- Length: 193 ft 10 in (59.08 m) (gundeck)
- Beam: 52 ft 4.5 in (15.964 m)
- Depth of hold: 22 ft 6 in (6.86 m)
- Propulsion: Sails
- Sail plan: Full-rigged ship
- Armament: 84 guns: Gundeck: 28 × 32 pdrs, 2 × 68 pdr carronades; Upper gundeck: 32 × 24 pdrs; Quarterdeck: 6 × 24 pdrs, 10 × 32 pdr carronades; Forecastle: 2 × 24 pdrs, 4 × 32 pdr carronades

HMS Clarence was an 84-gun second rate ship of the line of the Royal Navy, launched on 25 July 1827 at Pembroke Dockyard. The second navy ship to bear the name, she was ordered as HMS Goliath but renamed in 1826 prior to completion.

In 1872 she was lent to the Liverpool Catholic Reformatory Association for use as a boys reformatory ship, but was destroyed by a fire set by six of the boys whilst at her mooring in the Mersey in 1884.

Liverpool Catholic Reformatory Association was lent a replacement in 1885 called HMS Royal William (1833), a 120 gun first-rate ship reduced to a 72-gun screw ship in 1860. Renamed Clarence, she was ultimately also destroyed in the Mersey by arson on 26 July 1899.
