= SS Princess explosion =

Coordinates: 30.3681°N 91.2368°W

The Mississippi River steamboat Princess (built circa 1855) was traveling from Vicksburg to New Orleans, with many of the passengers heading to Mardi Gras, when its boilers exploded at Conrad's Point near Baton Rouge, Louisiana on February 27, 1859. The estimated death toll ranged from 70 (with an equivalent number injured) to as many as 200. Among the survivors were a "negro trader" named Ford, from Kentucky, and his "servant."
