= HMS Monarch (1832) =

Ship of the line of the Royal Navy

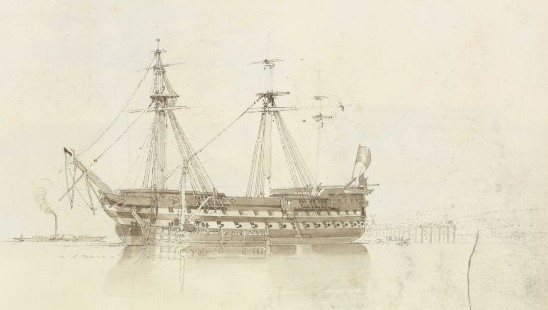
- Monarch at Sheerness, December 1850

History

United Kingdom
- Name: HMS Monarch
- Ordered: 23 July 1817
- Builder: Chatham Dockyard
- Laid down: August 1825
- Launched: 18 December 1832
- Fate: Broken up, 1866

General characteristics
- Class & type: Canopus-class ship of the line
- Tons burthen: 2255 bm
- Length: 193 ft 10 in (59.08 m) (gundeck)
- Beam: 52 ft 4.5 in (15.964 m)
- Depth of hold: 22 ft 6 in (6.86 m)
- Propulsion: Sails
- Sail plan: Full-rigged ship
- Armament: 84 guns: Gundeck: 28 × 32 pdrs, 2 × 68 pdr carronades; Upper gundeck: 32 × 24 pdrs; Quarterdeck: 6 × 24 pdrs, 10 × 32 pdr carronades; Forecastle: 2 × 24 pdrs, 4 × 32 pdr carronades

HMS Monarch was an 84-gun second rate ship of the line of the Royal Navy, launched on 18 December 1832 at Chatham Dockyard.

She was used as a target ship from 1862, and broken up in 1866.
