= HMS Royal William (1833) =

Ship of the line of the Royal Navy

History

United Kingdom
- Name: Royal William
- Ordered: 30 December 1823
- Builder: Pembroke Dockyard
- Laid down: October 1825
- Launched: 2 April 1833
- Fate: Burnt, 1899

General characteristics (as a steamship)
- Class & type: Broadened Caledonia-class ship of the line
- Displacement: 3,520 long tons (3,580 t)
- Tons burthen: 2,849 (bm)
- Length: 216 ft 9 in (66.07 m) (gun deck)
- Beam: 55 ft 7 in (16.94 m)
- Draught: 24 ft 7 in (7.5 m)
- Depth of hold: 23 ft (7.0 m)
- Installed power: 1,763 ihp (1,315 kW)
- Propulsion: 1 shaft; 1 single-expansion steam engine
- Sail plan: Full-rigged ship
- Complement: 830
- Armament: 89 muzzle-loading, smoothbore guns: Lower deck: 32 × 8 in (203 mm) shell guns; Upper deck: 34 × 32 pdrs; Quarter deck & Forecastle: 22 × 32 pdrs; 1 × 68 pdr

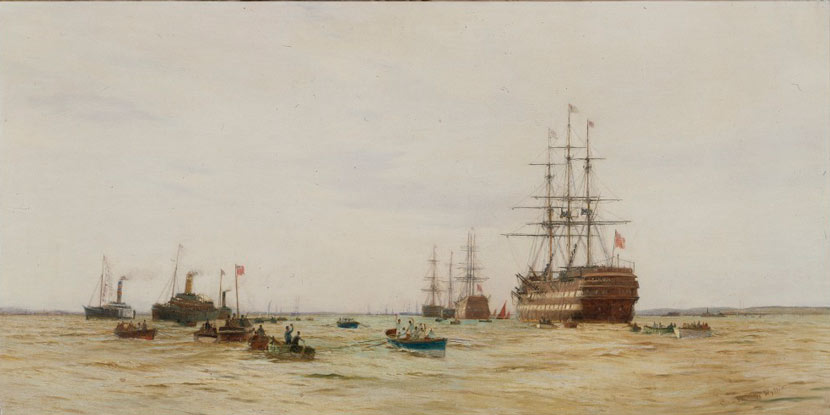
Painting of the first Mersey boat race between cadets of HMS Conway (on the right) and London's HMS Worcester on 11 June 1891. Clarence (ex-Royal William) is in the centre, furthest away.

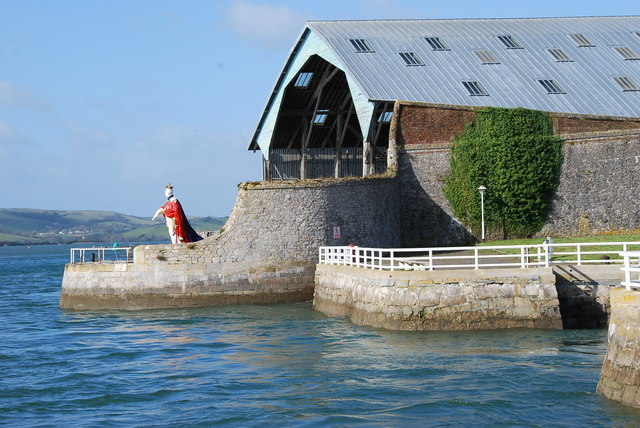
Replica figurehead of the Royal William at HMNB Devonport

HMS Royal William was a three-deck, 120-gun, first rate, broadened Caledonia-class ship of the line built for the Royal Navy (RN) during the 1830s. Completed in 1834, the ship remained in ordinary until she was razeed and converted into a screw-powered, two-deck, 89-gun, second rate in 1859–1860. She played a minor role in the Crimean War of 1854–1856 as a troopship and became a training ship in 1884.

== Description ==
As an 89-gun ship, Royal Wiliam measured 216 feet 9 inches (66.1 m) on the gundeck and about 177 feet (53.9 m) on the keel. She had a beam of 55 feet 7 inches (16.9 m), and a deep draught of 24 feet 7 inches (7.49 m) The ship displaced 3,520 long tons (3,580 t) and had a tonnage of 2849 tons burthen. She was fitted with a horizontal two-cylinder single-expansion steam engine built by Robert Napier & Sons that was rated at 500 nominal horsepower and drove a single propeller shaft. Her boilers provided enough steam to give the engine 1,763 indicated horsepower (1,315 kW) that was good for a speed of 10.6 knots (19.6 km/h; 12.2 mph) during her sea trials without masts or stores. Her crew numbered 830 officers and ratings.

The ship's muzzle-loading, smoothbore armament consisted of thirty-two 8 in (203 mm) shell guns on her lower gundeck and thirty-four 32-pounder (56 cwt) guns (Note: "Cwt" is the abbreviation for hundredweight, 56 cwt referring to the weight of the gun.) on her upper gundeck. Between her forecastle and quarterdeck, she carried twenty-two 32-pounder (42 cwt) guns and a single 68-pounder gun.

=== Conversion ===
After the Crimean War, the naval arms race in screw-powered ships of the line between Britain and France resumed. In mid-1858 Captain Baldwin Wake Walker, Surveyor of the Navy, estimated that Britain would have 36 battleships to France's 40 by the end of 1859. He persuaded the Admiralty to authorize the cutting down and conversion of the 120-gun first rates of the Caledonia and Nelson classes into steam-powered second rates based on the successful conversion of the second rate London.

== Construction and career ==
Royal William was ordered on 30 December 1823, laid down at Pembroke Dockyard in October 1825, launched on 2 April 1833 and completed in 1834. The ship's first commission was not until 16 February 1854 under Captain John Kingcome when she became the flagship of Commodore Michael Seymour, guard ship at Plymouth. Royal William was sent to the Baltic Sea in 1854 as a troopship and conveyed 764 prisoners of war captured during the Battle of Bomarsund in August back to the UK.

Royal William was ordered to be cut down and converted into a steamship on 5 February 1859. The work included lengthening the ship by about 11 feet (3.4 m) and began on 21 March. It was completed on 9 February 1860; she was never put into seagoing state for operation. In November 1884 she was lent to the Liverpool Roman Catholic Reformatory Society, who renamed her HMS Clarence to replace their first reformatory school ship of that name destroyed by arson in 1884. As the new Clarence, she was ultimately also destroyed by arson, on 26 July 1899 on the River Mersey near New Ferry on the Wirral Peninsula in England.
