= HMS Goliath =

Six ships of the British Royal Navy have been named HMS Goliath after the Biblical giant, Goliath.

- The first HMS Goliath (1781) was a 74-gun third-rate that fought in the Battle of the Nile.
- The second HMS Goliath was renamed in 1826 prior to completion, becoming HMS Clarence, an 84-gun ship of the line completed in 1827 and burnt in 1884.
- The third HMS Goliath (1842) was an 80-gun ship of the line, built in 1842. She was converted to screw propulsion in 1857 and burnt in 1875.
- The fourth HMS Goliath (1898) was a battleship launched in 1898 and sunk by the Ottoman torpedo boat Muavenet-i Milliye in 1915.
- The fifth and sixth Goliaths were tugs requisitioned for use during World War II.

== Fictional ships ==
HMS Goliath is the name of a fictional Royal Navy submarine in the radio series Deep Trouble. RMS Goliath is the name of a fictional transatlantic passenger liner in the 1981 two-part TV miniseries Goliath Awaits.
