= HMS Thunderer (1831) =

Ship of the line of the Royal Navy

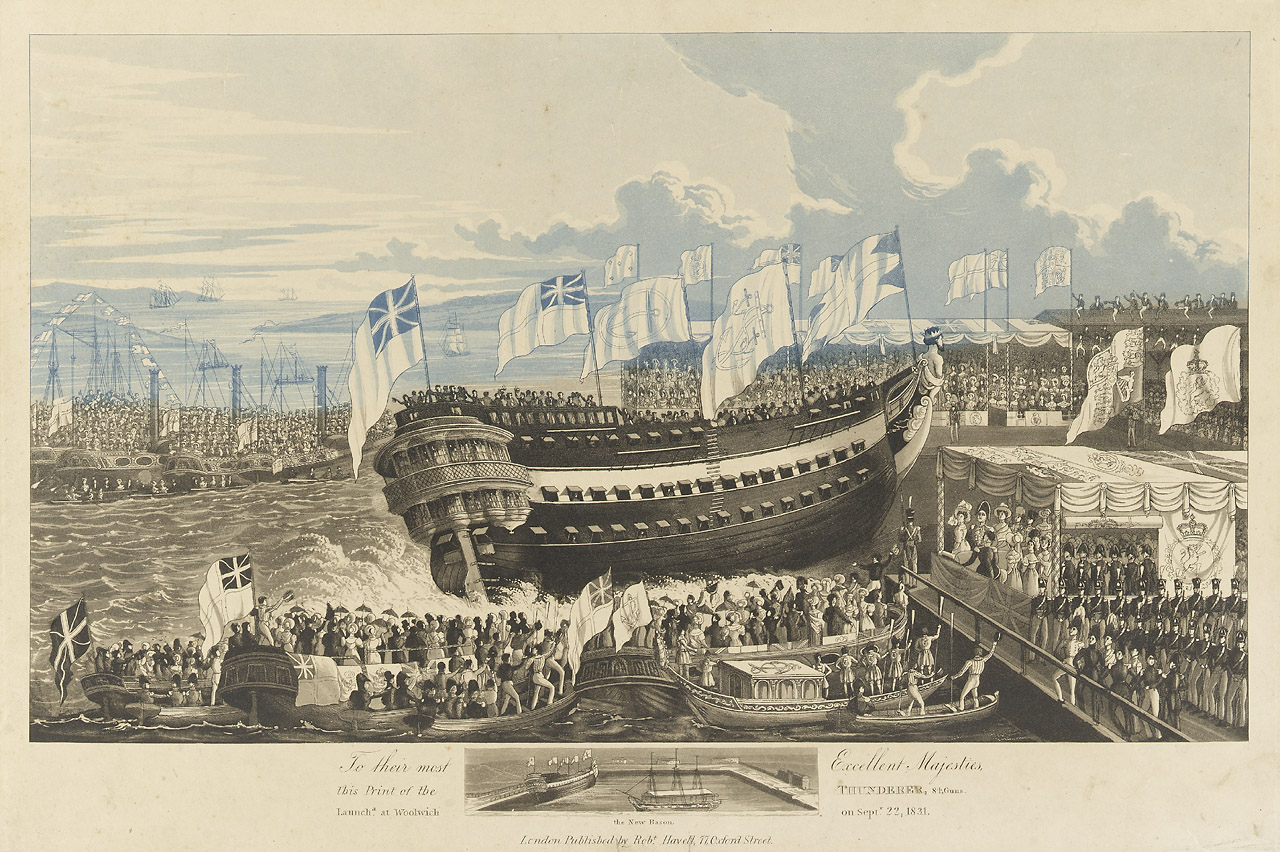
- Thunderer launched at Woolwich on 22 September 1831 (with inset a view of the New Basin)

History

United Kingdom
- Name: HMS Thunderer
- Ordered: 23 January 1817
- Builder: Woolwich Dockyard
- Laid down: April 1823
- Launched: 22 September 1831
- Renamed: HMS Comet, 1869; HMS Nettle, 1870
- Fate: Sold to be broken up, 1901
- Notes: Hulked, 1863

General characteristics
- Class & type: Canopus-class ship of the line
- Tons burthen: 2255 bm
- Length: 193 ft 10 in (59.08 m) (gundeck)
- Beam: 52 ft 4.5 in (15.964 m)
- Depth of hold: 22 ft 6 in (6.86 m)
- Propulsion: Sails
- Sail plan: Full-rigged ship
- Complement: 700 officers and men
- Armament: 84 guns: Gundeck: 28 × 32 pdrs, 2 × 68 pdr carronades; Upper gundeck: 32 × 24 pdrs; Quarterdeck: 6 × 24 pdrs, 10 × 32 pdr carronades; Forecastle: 2 × 24 pdrs, 4 × 32 pdr carronades

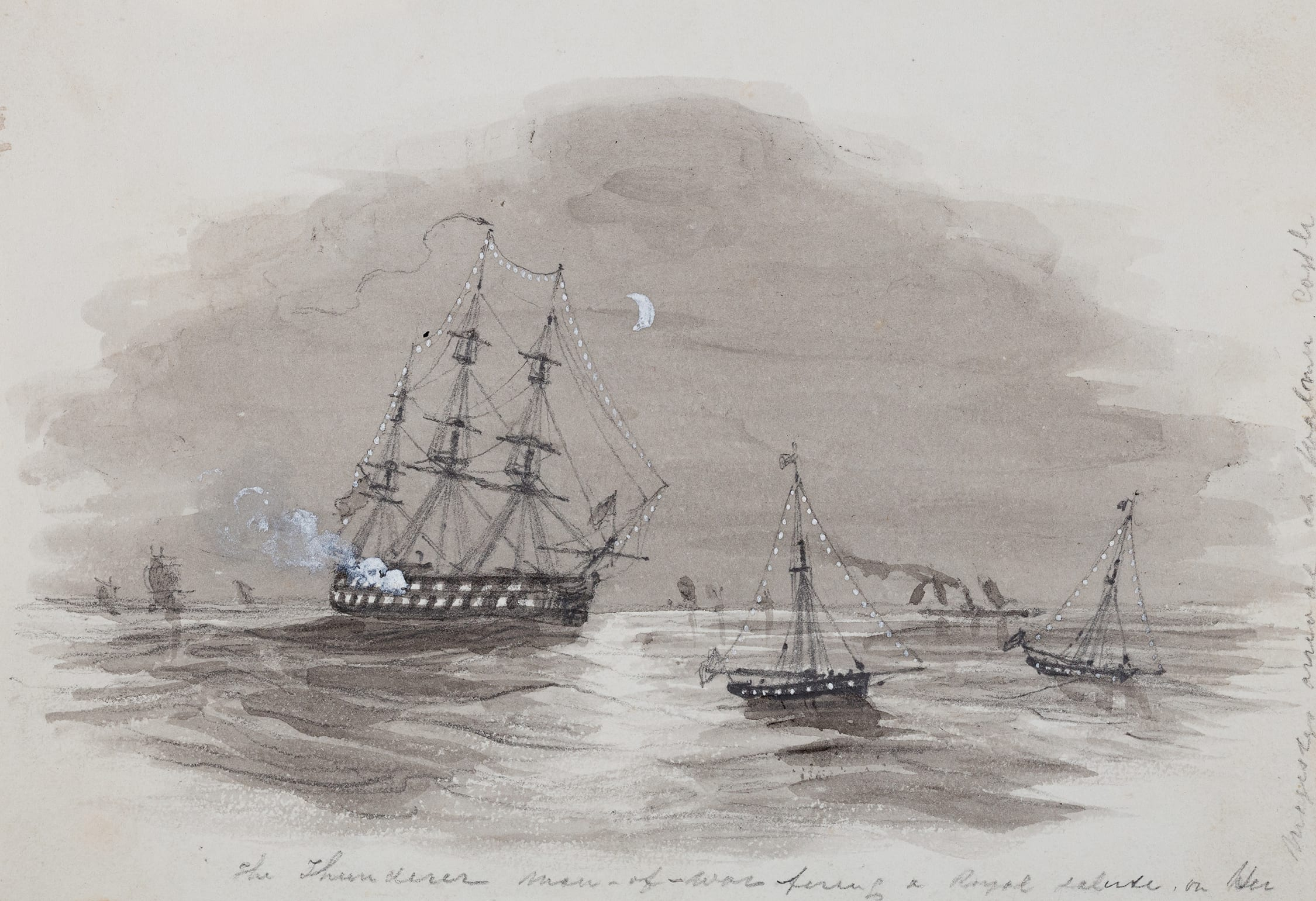
The Thunderer, Man-of-War firing a Royal Salute on her Majesties arrival at Walmer Castle (1842) by Ebenezer Landells

HMS Thunderer was a two-deck 84-gun second rate ship of the line, a modified version of the Canopus/Formidable-class launched on 22 September 1831 at Woolwich Dockyard.

She was hulked in 1863 as a target ship at Portsmouth. Thunderer was renamed twice in quick succession: first in 1869 to Comet after (C / 1868 L1 Winnecke), and again in 1870 to Nettle. HMS Nettle was sold in December 1901 to Messrs. King & co, of Garston, to be broken up.
