= HMS Powerful (1826) =

Ship of the line of the Royal Navy

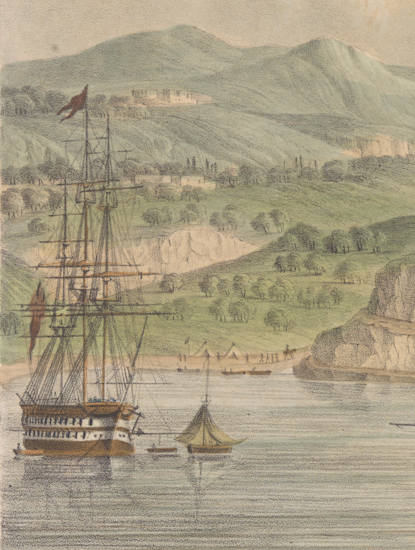
- HMS Powerful at the English Camp at Djouni, (near Sidon), Syria in 1840

History

United Kingdom
- Name: HMS Powerful
- Ordered: 23 January 1817
- Builder: Chatham Dockyard
- Laid down: August 1820
- Launched: 21 June 1826
- Fate: Broken up, 1864

General characteristics
- Class & type: Canopus-class ship of the line
- Tons burthen: 2296 bm
- Length: 193 ft 10 in (59.08 m) (gundeck)
- Beam: 52 ft 4.5 in (15.964 m)
- Depth of hold: 22 ft 6 in (6.86 m)
- Propulsion: Sails
- Sail plan: Full-rigged ship
- Complement: 635 men, 60 boys, 150 marines
- Armament: 84 guns: Gundeck: 28 × 32 pdrs, 2 × 68 pdr carronades; Upper gundeck: 32 × 24 pdrs; Quarterdeck: 6 × 24 pdrs, 10 × 32 pdr carronades; Forecastle: 2 × 24 pdrs, 4 × 32 pdr carronades

HMS Powerful was an 84-gun second rate ship of the line of the Royal Navy, launched on 19 May 1825 at Chatham Dockyard.

From 1 January 1839 to the end of 1840 Powerful was commanded by Captain Charles Napier, mainly in the Mediterranean and for much of the time as lead ship of a detached squadron under Napier's orders. On the evening of 29 May 1839 she was anchored in the Cove of Cork, Ireland when Napier received urgent orders from the Admiralty to proceed at once to Malta in view of the imminent probability of war with Egypt. He was also informed that the ships-of-the-line HMS Ganges and HMS Implacable had already started from England. Wishing to overtake them, Napier set sail at 2 a.m. on the 30th for Gibraltar. Powerful arrived at Gibraltar on 12 June to hear the other two ships were three days ahead of her, but by superior seamanship Napier overtook them in the Mediterranean and Powerful entered the harbour of La Valletta, Malta on the evening of 24 June, with band playing and under every stitch of canvas, twelve hours ahead of her rivals.

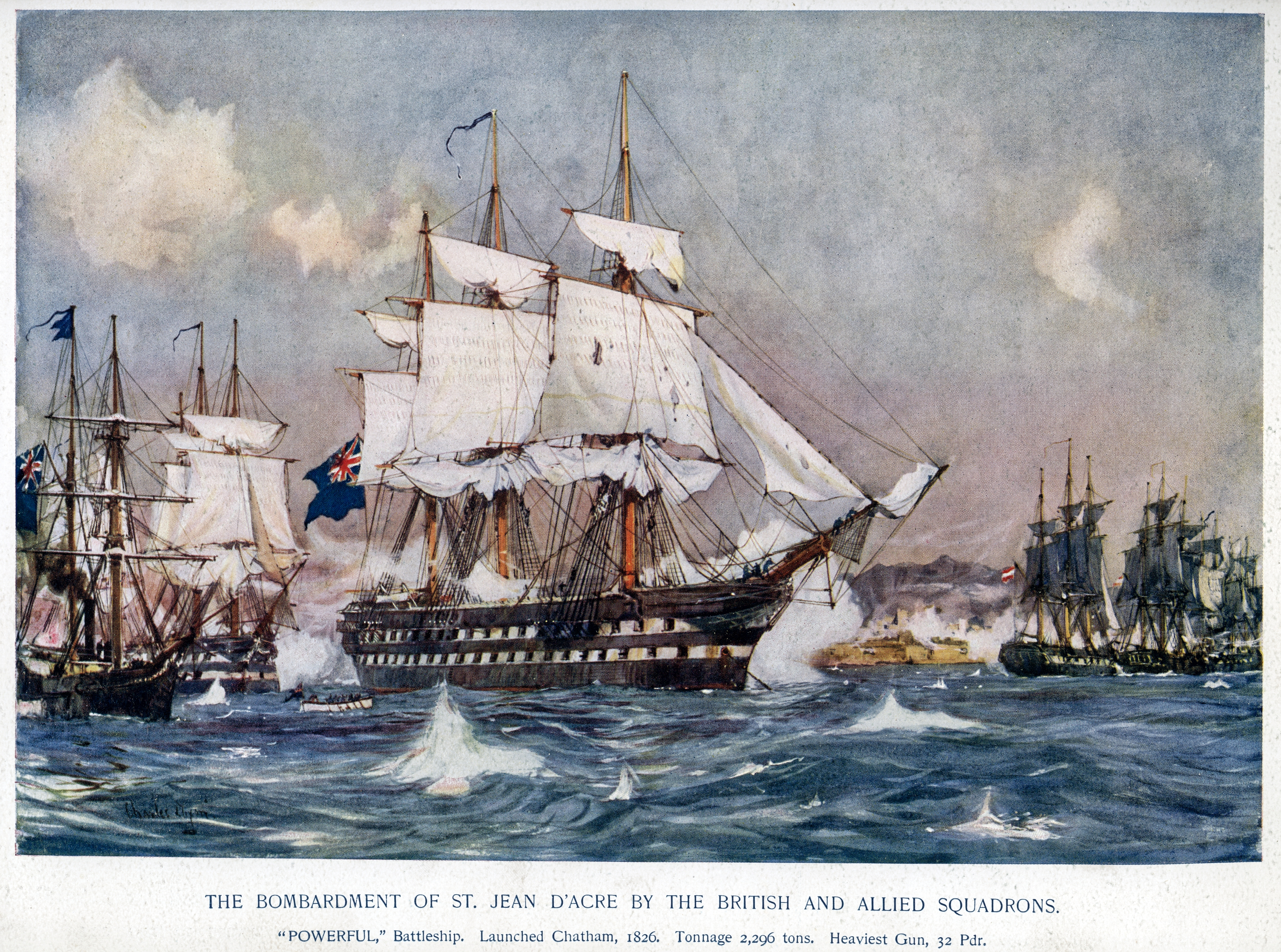
Powerful at the 1840 Battle of St Jean D'Acre, by Charles Dixon

After a year in the Mediterranean while the political situation changed, the ship took a prominent part in the Syrian War against the expansionist designs of Mehmet Ali, notably at the bombardment of Acre, 3 November 1840, where she sustained damage but no casualties. Powerful was then flagship of the squadron that blockaded Alexandria from 25 November. In 1841 Napier was succeeded as her captain by George Mansel, and then Sir Michael Seymour, who commanded her from 1841 until she paid off at Portsmouth in 1843. She was recommissioned in 1848 under the command of Sir Richard Saunders Dundas under whom she again served in the Mediterranean.

Powerful was used as a target in 1860, and was broken up in 1864.
