= HMS Asia (1824) =

Ship of the line of the Royal Navy

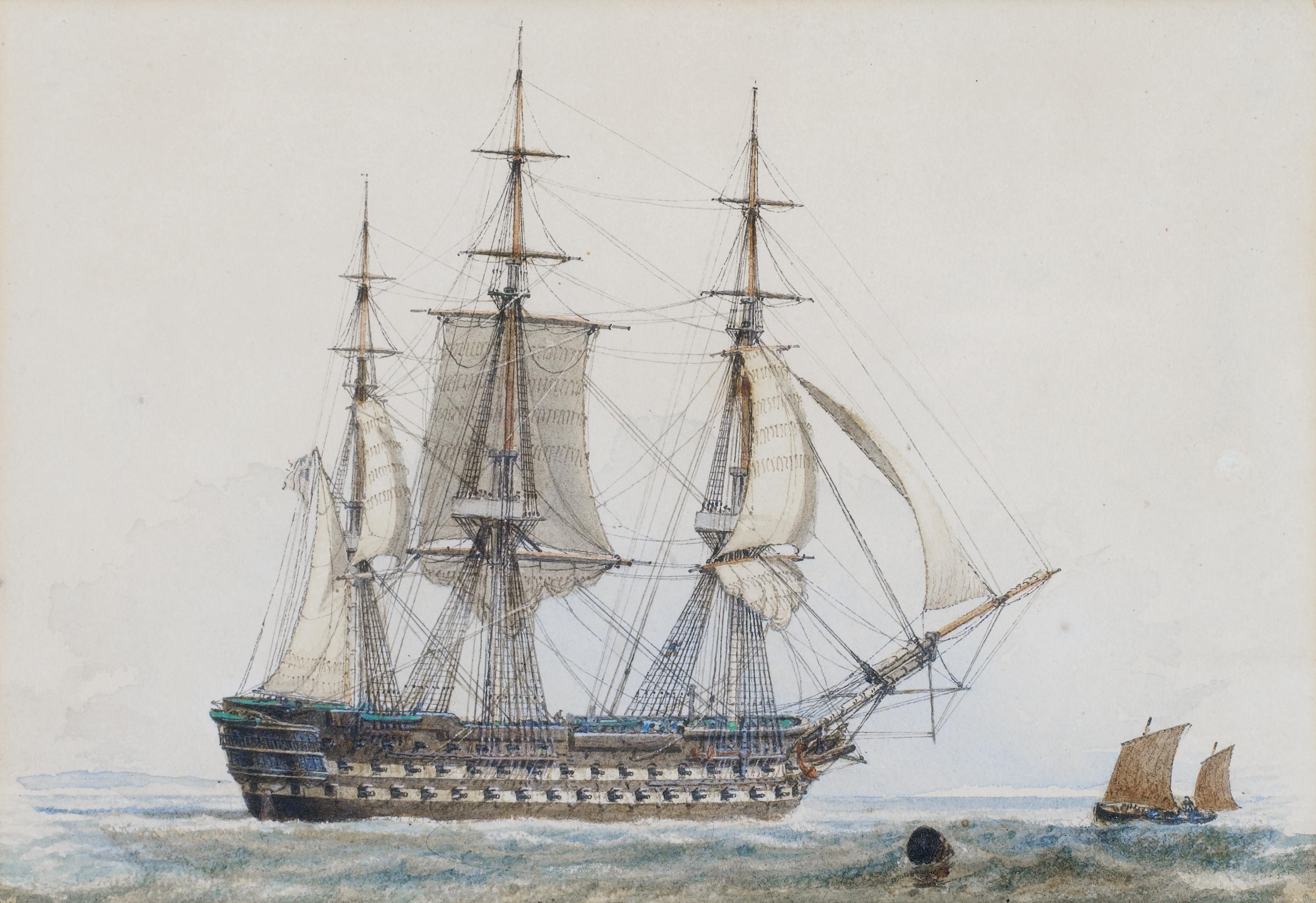
- Asia by John Ward of Hull

History

United Kingdom
- Name: HMS Asia
- Ordered: 22 April 1819
- Builder: Bombay Dockyard
- Laid down: January 1822
- Launched: 19 January 1824
- Fate: Sold, 1908

General characteristics
- Class & type: Canopus-class ship of the line
- Tons burthen: 2289 bm
- Length: 193 ft 10 in (59.08 m) (gundeck)
- Beam: 52 ft 4.5 in (15.964 m)
- Depth of hold: 22 ft 6 in (6.86 m)
- Propulsion: Sails
- Sail plan: Full-rigged ship
- Armament: 84 guns: Gundeck: 28 × 32-pounders, 2 × 68-pounder carronades; Upper gundeck: 32 × 24-pounders; Quarterdeck: 6 × 24-pounders, 10 × 32-pounder carronades; Forecastle: 2 × 24-pounders, 4 × 32-pounder carronades

Figurehead of HMS Asia from the collection of the National Museum of the Royal Navy, 2025

HMS Asia was an 84-gun second rate ship of the line of the Royal Navy, launched on 19 January 1824 at Bombay Dockyard.

She was Codrington's flagship at the Battle of Navarino.

She served in the Syria campaign against Mehemet Ali, in the Eastern Mediterranean, 1840–41.

In 1858 she was converted to serve as a guardship, and during several years she was flagship of the Admiral-Superintendent of Portsmouth Dockyard.

In 1908 she was sold out of the navy.

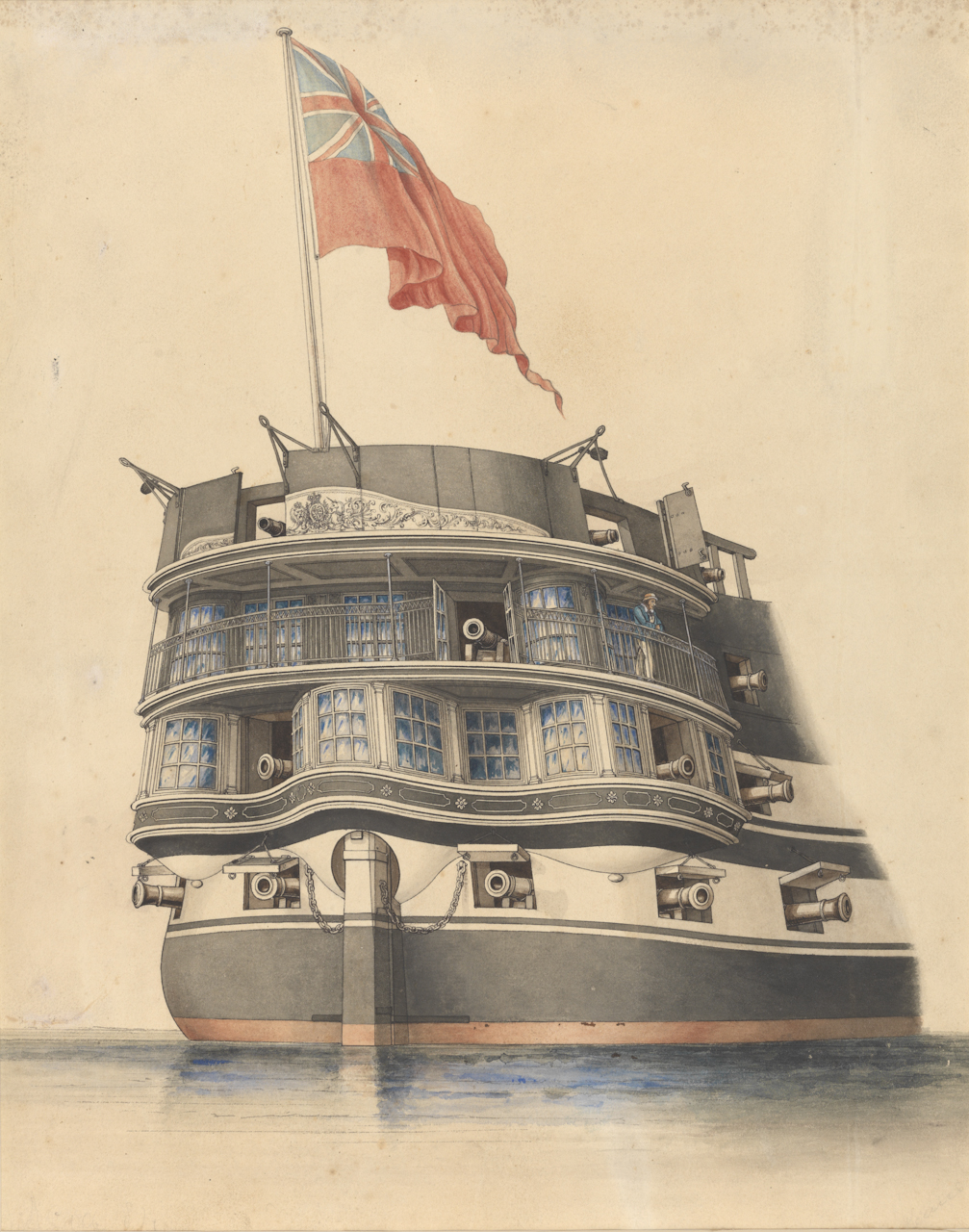
Sternview of HMS Asia by Edward William Cooke (1811–1880)

== Figurehead ==
The figurehead was removed from the ship before it was sold in 1909 as it appears in the 1911 Admiralty Catalogue amongst other figureheads, where it was described as a 'Figurehead of a Rajah (bust)'.

The figurehead can be seen on display at the National Museum of the Royal Navy, Portsmouth.
