= HMS Agamemnon (1852) =

1852 ship

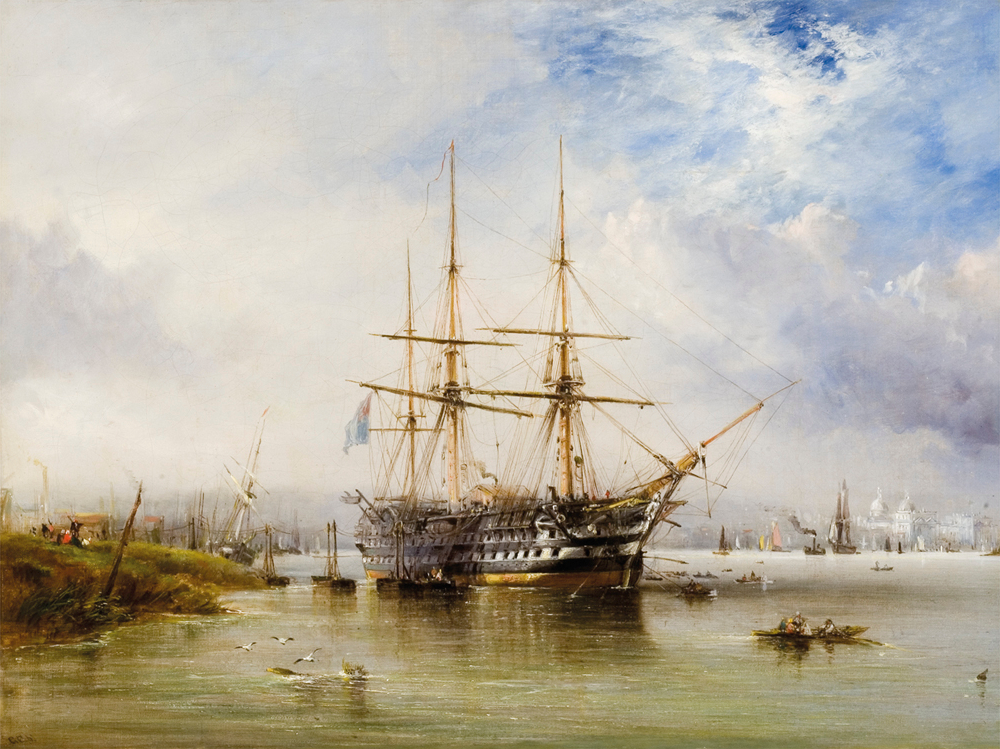
- Agamemnon lying off Greenwich by George Chambers the Younger

History

United Kingdom
- Name: Agamemnon
- Namesake: King Agamemnon of Mycenae
- Ordered: 20 June 1849
- Launched: 22 May 1852
- Completed: 9 February 1853
- Commissioned: 27 September 1852
- Fate: Sold for scrap, 12 May 1870

General characteristics (as built)
- Class & type: 91-gun, second-rate Agamemnon-class ship of the line
- Tons burthen: 3,102 49/94 bm
- Length: 230 ft (70.1 m) (gundeck)
- Beam: 55 ft 6 in (16.9 m)
- Draught: 18 ft 8 in (5.7 m)
- Depth of hold: 24 ft 6 in (7.5 m)
- Installed power: 2,268 ihp (1,691 kW)
- Propulsion: 1 screw; 1 trunk steam engine
- Sail plan: Full-rigged ship
- Speed: 11.2 knots (20.7 km/h; 12.9 mph) (trials)
- Complement: 860
- Armament: 91 muzzle-loading, smoothbore guns: Lower deck: 34 × 8 in (203 mm) shell guns; Upper deck: 34 × 32 pdrs; Quarterdeck & Forecastle: 22 × 32 pdrs; 1 × 68 pdr

HMS Agamemnon was the lead ship of her class of 91-gun, second-rate ships of the line constructed during the 1850s for the Royal Navy. Completed in 1853, she was assigned to the Channel Squadron before being transferred to the Mediterranean Fleet where she became the flagship of the fleet's second-in-command. The ship served in the Black Sea theatre during the Crimean War of 1854–1856, most notably participating in the bombardment of Sevastopol in 1854 and the bombardment of Kinburn the following year.

Agamemnon was paid off in 1856 to be refitted to carry half of the first transatlantic telegraph cable. The first attempt in 1857 was a failure, but the second attempt a year later was successful. The ship was paid off afterwards but was recommissioned at the end of the year. She was assigned to the Mediterranean Fleet and was then transferred to the North America and West Indies Station in 1862. Agamemnon was paid off later that year and was sold for scrap in 1870.

== Description ==
The Agamemnon-class ships of the line were built in response to the perceived threat from France by the construction of the Napoléon-class battleships. Agamemnon measured 230 feet (70.1 m) on the gundeck and 195 feet 2 inches (59.5 m) on the keel. She had a beam of 55 feet 6 inches (16.9 m), a depth of hold of 24 feet 6 inches (7.5 m), a deep draught of 18 feet 8 inches (5.69 m) and had a tonnage of 3,102 49/94 tons burthen.

Agamemnon was fitted with a two-cylinder trunk steam engine built by John Penn and Sons that was rated at 600 nominal horsepower and drove a single 18-foot (5.5 m) propeller. Her tubular boilers provided enough steam to give the engine 2,268 indicated horsepower (1,691 kW) that was good for a speed of 11.2 knots (20.7 km/h; 12.9 mph) during her sea trials on 3 May 1853. The ship's crew numbered 860 officers and ratings.

The ships had three masts and was ship-rigged. To reduce drag and improve performance under sail, the Agamemnons could hoist their propeller into the hull and retract the telescoping funnel. The ships were regarded as very manoeuverable for steamships, able to match sailing ships in their ability to tack and wear with precision. Captain Geoffrey Hornby regarded the sailing qualities of his Edgar as "superb" in a letter to his wife on 9 June 1863.

The ships' muzzle-loading, smoothbore armament consisted of thirty-four 8 in (203 mm) shell guns on their lower gundeck and thirty-four 32-pounder (56 cwt) guns (Note: "Cwt" is the abbreviation for hundredweight, 56 cwt referring to the weight of the gun.) on their upper gundeck. Between their forecastle and quarterdeck, they carried twenty-two 32-pounder (45 cwt) guns. The single 68-pounder gun was positioned on the forecastle as a pivot gun so that it could serve as a bow chaser.

== Construction and career ==
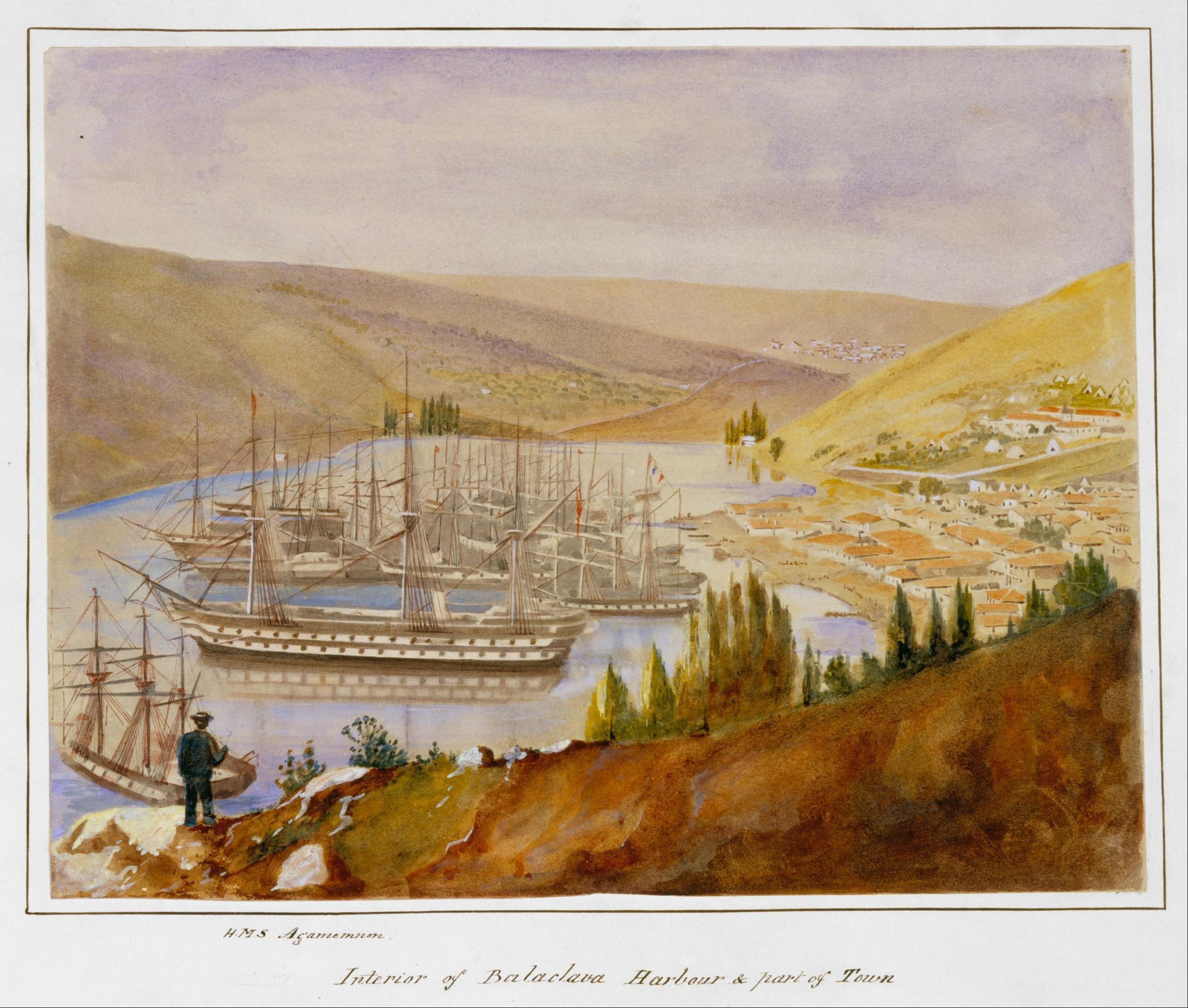
Agamemnon in Balaclava Harbour in 1855, by James Robertson

Agamemnon was originally ordered on 27 February 1841 as a 80-gun, second-rate ship of the line; she was reordered as a screw-propelled ship on 20 June 1849. The ship was laid down in November at Woolwich Dockyard although her design by Isaac Watts was not finalised until 14 June 1850 and was reclassified as a 91-gun second rate on 26 March 1851. Agamemnon was the first purpose-built screw-powered ship of the line built for the Royal Navy. Launched on 22 May 1852, she was commissioned at Sheerness Dockyard on 29 September 1852 by Captain Sir Thomas Maitland, and completed on 9 February 1853. Agamemnon participated in the Spithead Fleet Review held on 11 August and was then assigned to the Channel Squadron. The ship was later transferred to the Mediterranean Fleet and served as flagship of Rear-Admiral Sir Edmund Lyons, the second-in-command of the fleet. Captain William Mends relieved Maitland on 21 October and was relieved in his turn by Captain Thomas Symonds on 26 December.

The decisive Russian victory in the Battle of Sinop over the Ottoman Navy on 30 November 1853 alarmed politicians in both Britain and France. They decided to intervene on the side of the Ottomans and both countries ordered ships from their Mediterranean Fleets into the Bosphorus on 24 December and then into the Black Sea on 3 January 1854 where they visited Sinop. At this time, Agamemnon and the 70-gun, third rate Sans Pareil were the only steam-powered ships of the line in the Mediterranean Fleet. Lyons was then ordered to take his flagship, Sans Pareil and the paddle frigates Terrible and Sampson, together with equivalent forces from the French and Ottoman Navies, and escort troopships and transports that were reinforcing Ottoman forces operating in the Caucasus. The Russians made no effort to interfere with these forces, but did not withdraw their forces in the Balkans as demanded by the British and French governments on 27 February. Declarations of war by both governments followed a month later, although the British commanders in the Black Sea did not learn of this until 9 April.

Agamemnon was present during the bombardment of Odessa (modern Odesa) on 22 April, but did not actually participate in the bombardment. The fleets then sailed to Sevastopol and remained there until 5 May. Lyons was detached that day to reconnoitre the eastern coast of the Black Sea for an alternative landing place and a harbour closer than Varna, Bulgaria. He was also to attack coastal defences, but not undefended towns. His detachment consisted of his flagship, the French ship of the line Charlemagne and seven smaller steam-powered ships. A preliminary reconnaissance revealed that the garrison of Redoubt Kali was small and Lyons sailed south to see if he could borrow some Ottoman troops from the commanders there. The answer was affirmative and he disembarked them at a nearby beach on 19 May while Agamemnon and Charlemagne bombarded the coastal fortifications. The garrison destroyed their magazines before retreating inland. Lyons rejoined the Allied fleet at Kavarna, Bulgaria, on 28 May.

Having received the order to invade the Crimea on 16 July, Vice-Admiral James Dundas, commander-in-chief of the Mediterranean Fleet and of British naval forces in the Black Sea, delegated the task of scouting out possible landing sites near Sevastopol to Lyons with Agamemnon and several smaller ships from 21 to 25 July. The ship contributed 30 sailors to a landing party that assisted Turkish forces at Roustchouk (modern Ruse, Bulgaria), building a pontoon bridge and manning Turkish gunboats on the Danube River, in July–August. The following month, she offloaded some of her 32-pounder guns and their crews to serve as siege artillery for the Siege of Sevastopol. In late September Dundas ordered that each of his large warships should contribute 200 crewmen and the bulk of their Royal Marines to form an ad-hoc naval brigade.

Agamemnon participated in the naval bombardment of Sevastopol on 17 October. She was the closest ship to Fort Constantine at a range of about 750–800 yards (690–730 m); close enough that the fort's guns could not depress far enough to target her hull, only her masts and rigging. The ship was set on fire twice and hit 214 times including by three shells and a rocket. The latter struck her 6 feet (1.8 m) below the waterline. The detonation of its warhead caused an impressive concussion, but little damage; a diver later found the rocket's remains sticking out of the hull. Lyons' flag lieutenant, Cowper Phipps Coles, wrote after the battle that hardly a rope aloft was left uncut and that the upper deck was covered in splinters. Although the crewmen that normally manned the upper-deck guns were deployed ashore, the ship had 4 men killed and 25 wounded, although it appears that 3 of the wounded subsequently died.

During the Great Storm of 1854 on 14 November, she was driven ashore, but was quickly refloated. Three days later, Captain Thomas Sabine Pasley relieved Symonds. Lyons was promoted to vice-admiral on 22 December and replaced Dundas. He kept his flag aboard Agamemnon until he transferred to Royal Albert on 14 February 1855. On 22 May, the ship was part of the fleet that landed Allied troops near the city of Kerch. The Russian troops in the vicinity withdrew, demolishing the local defences and burning most of their supplies, allowing the Allies to occupy and loot Kerch and Yeni-Kale. The fleet then successfully attacked Taganrog on 3 June with Agamemnon contributing two boats and their crews to the attack.

The ship participated in the bombardment of the Kinburn Fortress, at the mouth of the Dnieper–Bug estuary, on 17 October, and Agamemnon was ordered to return to Malta the following month. Captain James Stopford relieved Pasley on 10 February 1856 and she was paid off on 12 July.

=== Cable laying ===
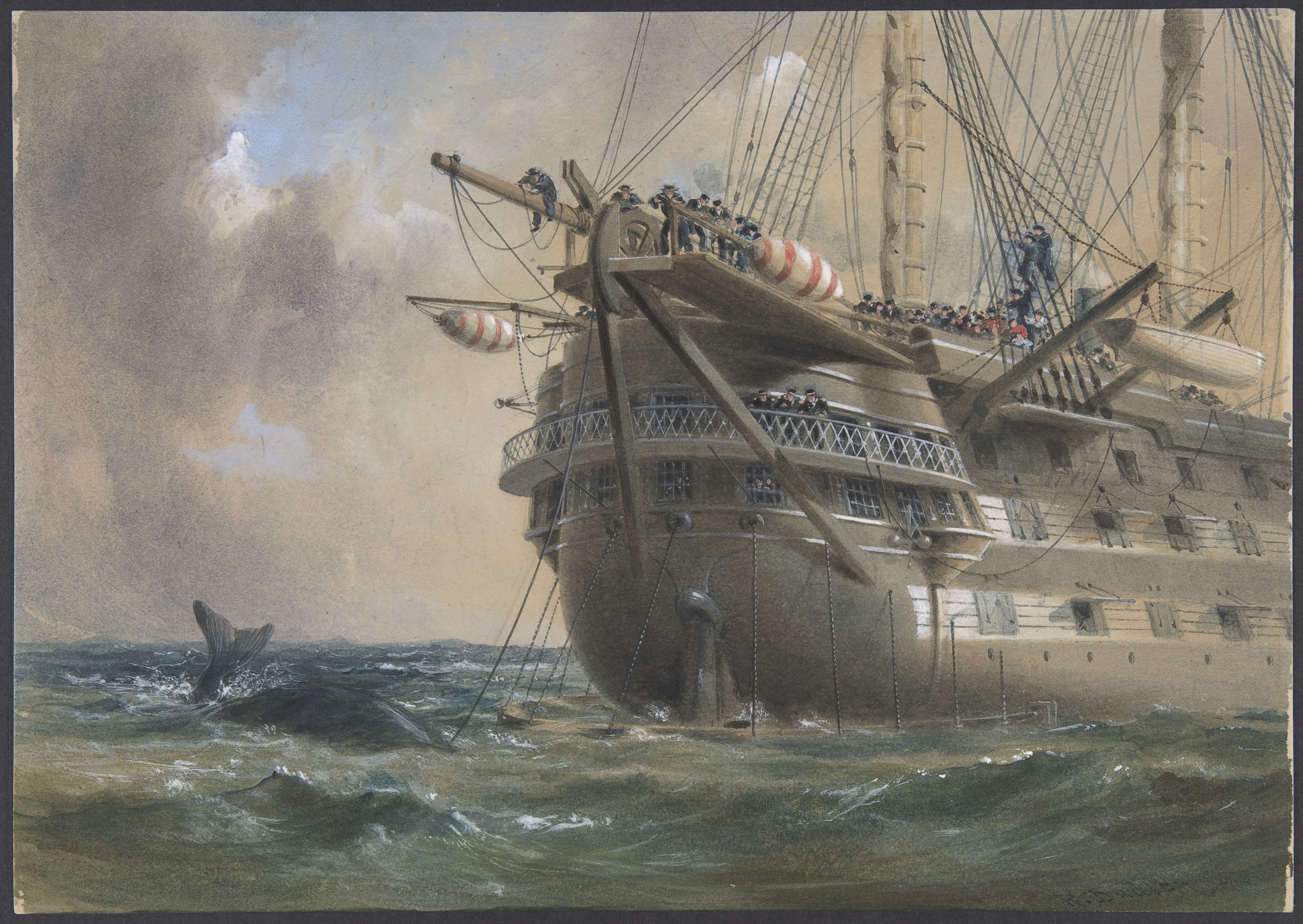
Agamemnon laying cable, 1858, by Robert Charles Dudley

Work to convert her to carry 1,250 miles (2,010 km) of telegraph cable began in November at HM Dockyard, Portsmouth, and included replacing her masts and rigging with lighter equivalents to improve her stability and make her easier to manage under steam. A forward hold (45 by 45 feet (13.7 by 13.7 m) and 20 feet (6.1 m) deep) was also built to house the cable. Agamemnon was recommissioned on 28 April 1857 by Master Commanding Cornelius Noddall. The ship began loading the cable in June at Glass, Elliot & Co.'s facility in Greenwich which was completed by mid-July. The ship rendezvoused with the American steam frigate Niagara which was carrying the rest of the cable in Queenstown (now Cobh) harbour on 31 July to test the splice between the two cables as Agamemnon was to splice the cable in mid-ocean when Niagara's cable ran out. After the successful test, the ships steamed for Foilhommerum Bay on Valentia Island on 3 August. Two days later the armoured shore portion of the cable was landed from Niagara and successfully tested on the cable in Agamemnon.

The ships set out for Newfoundland on 7 August, but the armoured cable jammed in Niagara's paying-out machinery and broke before the ship had steamed five miles (8.0 km). The broken end was retrieved from the sea bottom and spliced to the cable. On 11 August the cable snapped as the machinery proved incapable of maintaining the proper tension on the cable hanging from the American frigate's stern in very deep water. Cyrus W. Field, head of the Atlantic Telegraph Company, asked that Niagara and Agamemnon remain in the area for a few days to conduct experiments in splicing the cable together in mid-ocean and each ship laying in opposite directions while he consulted with his board of directors. The board decided that it was too late in the season to replace the lost cable before bad weather in the North Atlantic became more common. The ships were to unload the cable that they had on board at HM Dockyard, Devonport, and return to their respective navies.

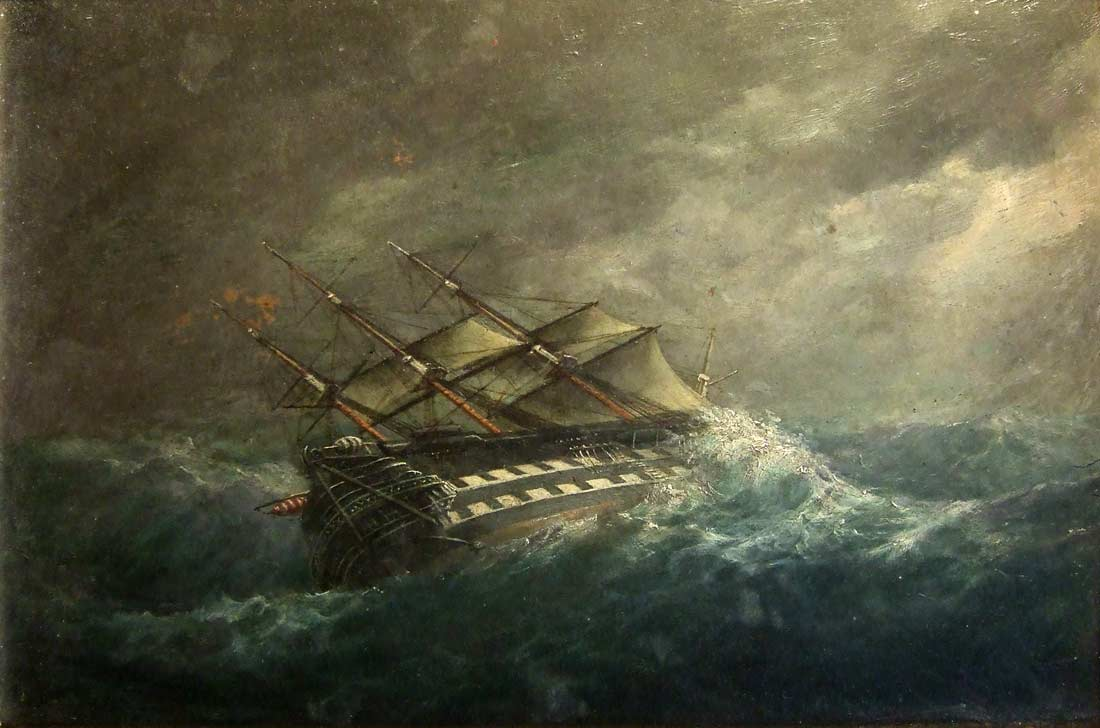
Agamemnon during the storm on 21 June 1858 by Henry Clifford

Captain George Preedy assumed command on 31 March 1858. Field had been given permission to use Niagara and Agamemnon for another attempt in mid-1858. The two ships spent April and half of May loading cable and rehearsed another mid-ocean splice in the Bay of Biscay, before departing for their starting point on 10 June. A violent storm arose three days later and lasted for 10 days; Niagara rode it out without much trouble, but the smaller Agamemnon suffered severely. Top heavy with 250 tons of cable on her forward upper deck and down by the bow, the ship rolled violently, reporters aboard estimating more than 30 degrees to each side. The extreme motions caused the additional coal that had been stowed in the rear of the ship in large bags to break loose or ruptured many of the bags, spreading coal through the lower part of the hull. In addition the top of the lower coil of cable had worked itself loose and resembled a "cargo of live eels". The weather began to moderate on 22 June and Agamemnon reached the rendezvous point three days later. The ship had 45 men injured and one hundred miles (160 km) of cable were in a "laocoönian tangle".

The British ship took aboard Niagara's cable, spliced it successfully, but were only 6 miles (9.7 km) apart when the excess slack on Niagra's cable fouled on a pulley and broke. Professor William Thomson was aboard Agamemnon as the company's chief electrician and he continually tested the connectivity between the two ships. As the ships had laid about 80 miles (130 km) of cable, he reported that he had lost the signal. The electrician aboard Niagra reported the same thing and the ships rendezvoused to compare notes. Unable to determine what had happened, Field ordered another attempt would be made the next day, although everyone agreed that if another break occurred before the ships were more than 100 miles apart, they would return to the rendezvous point and wait for eight days before returning to Cobh. The lower coil of cable aboard Agamemnon had been damaged in the storm, and it snapped with the ships were about 112 miles (180 km) apart. Niagara immediately headed back to the port, but Preedy unsuccessfully searched for the American ship, hoping that the American captain hadn't taken the agreement too literally, and arrived in Cobh a week after Niagara.

Field and the board of directors agreed on a third and final attempt using the remaining cable. Resupplied with coal and food, the ships departed Cobh on 17 July. Agamemnon reached the rendezvous point on 28 July, five days after Niagra. They spliced the cable together the next day and began to separate without incident until a damaged portion of the cable was spotted aboard Agamemnon later that night. The ship hove to in order to cut out the damaged section despite the increased strain that would place on the brakes of the playing-out machinery. The cable was successfully spliced together and passed through the machinery without any problems. Agamemnon had burned an excessive amount of coal fighting headwinds enroute to the rendezvous and was fighting them again despite moving in the opposite direction. Preedy ordered her sails, topmasts and spars struck to the deck in an effort to reduce the ship's wind resistance. The wind came about the following day and the ship was able to make better progress with the use of her sails. The wind developed into a gale, but the cable played out without issue despite the weather. Agamemnon reached Valentia on 5 August; Niagra had landed her end the previous day in Newfoundland and signals were exchanged between the respective telegraph offices.

=== Subsequent activities ===
Agamemnon was paid off on 1 September 1858, and was recommissioned by Captain Thomas Hope on 12 May 1859 for service with the Mediterranean Fleet. The ship was transferred to the North America and West Indies Station in January 1862. She was paid off 18 October. By 1865 her armament had been reduced to 70 guns and another gun had been added by 1869. The ship was at Portsmouth until she was sold to be broken up on 2 May 1870 to W. H. Moore.

== Bibliography ==
- Brown, David K. (2015) [1990]. Before the Ironclad: Warship Design and Development 1815–1860. Naval Institute Press. ISBN 978-1-59114-605-6.
- Clowes, William Laird (1901). The Royal Navy: A History from the Earliest Times to the Present. Vol. VI. Sampson Low, Marston. OCLC 831762020.
- Colledge, J. J.; Warlow, Ben & Bush, Steve (2020). Ships of the Royal Navy: The Complete Record of all Fighting Ships of the Royal Navy from the 15th Century to the Present (5th revised and updated ed.). Seaforth Publishing. ISBN 978-1-5267-9327-0.
- Cookson, Gillian (2006). The Cable. Tempus Publishing. ISBN 978-0-7524-3903-7.
- Duckers, Peter (2011). The Crimean War at Sea: Naval Campaigns against Russia, 1854-56. Pen & Sword Maritime. ISBN 978-1-84884-267-0.
- Gordon, John Steele (2002). A Thread across the Ocean: The Heroic Story of the Transatlantic Cable. Walker & Co. ISBN 0-8027-1364-5.
- Lambert, Andrew D. (1984). Battleships in Transition: The Creation of the Steam Battlefleet 1815–1860. Conway Maritime Press. ISBN 0-85177-315-X.
- Winfield, Rif (2014). British Warships in the Age of Sail 1817–1863: Design, Construction, Careers and Fates. Seaforth Publishing. ISBN 978-1-84832-169-4.
