= HMS James Watt =

Ship of the line of the Royal Navy

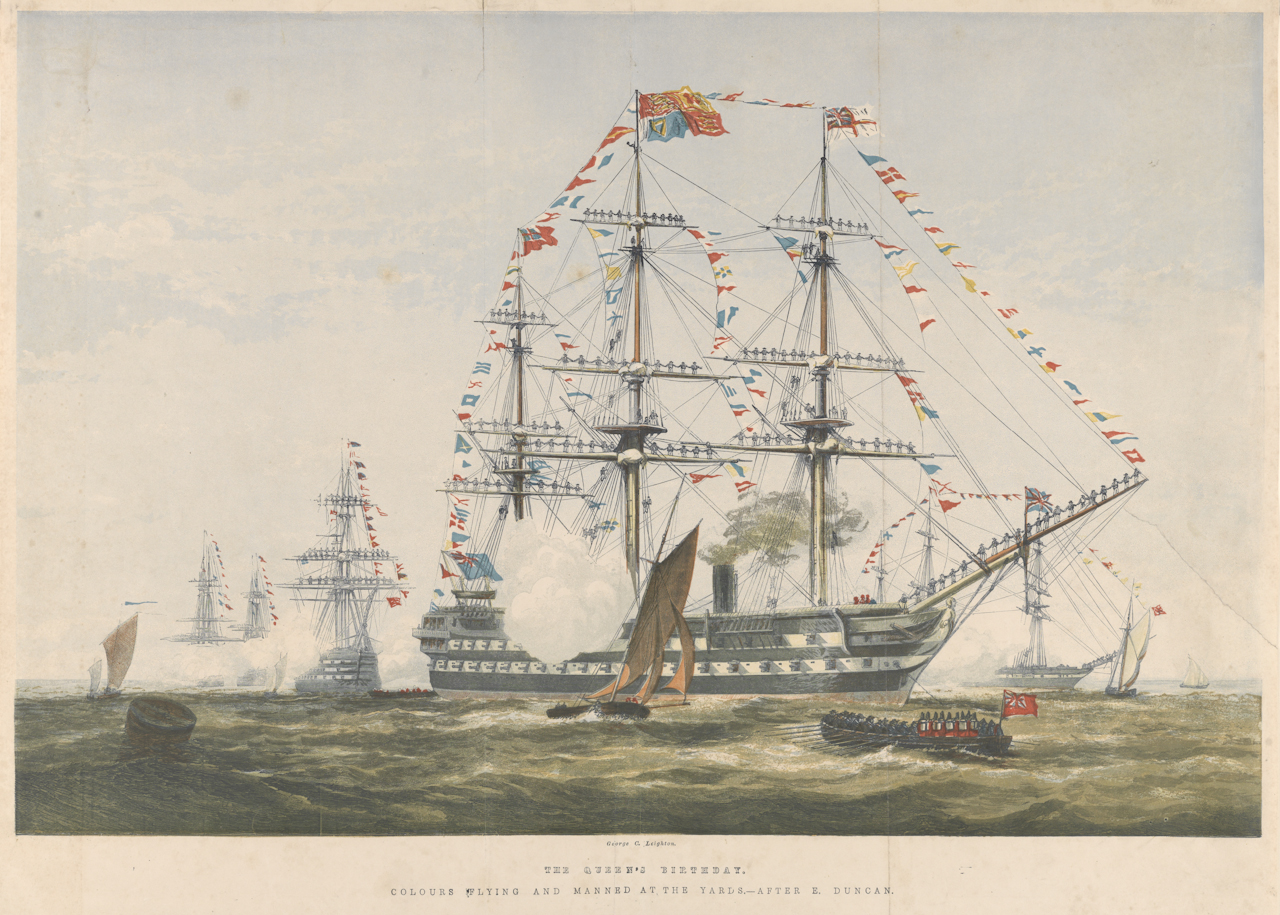
- The Queen's Birthday in 1856. James Watt with colours Flying and Manned at the Yards

History

United Kingdom
- Name: James Watt
- Namesake: James Watt
- Ordered: 25 April 1847
- Builder: Pembroke Dock
- Laid down: September 1850
- Launched: 23 April 1853
- Completed: 27 March 1854
- Commissioned: 20 January 1854
- Decommissioned: 21 June 1862
- Renamed: Ordered as Audacious; renamed, 18 November 1847
- Fate: Sold for scrap, January 1875

General characteristics (as built)
- Class & type: 91-gun, second-rate Agamemnon-class ship of the line
- Tons burthen: 3,082 79/94 bm
- Length: 230 ft 3 in (70.2 m) (overall)
- Beam: 55 ft 5 in (16.9 m)
- Draught: 19 ft 8 in (6.0 m)
- Depth of hold: 24 ft 8 in (7.5 m)
- Installed power: 1,543 ihp (1,151 kW)
- Propulsion: 1 screw; 1 single-expansion steam engine
- Sail plan: Full-rigged ship
- Speed: 9.4 knots (17.4 km/h; 10.8 mph) (trials)
- Complement: 860
- Armament: 91 muzzle-loading, smoothbore guns: Lower deck: 34 × 8 in (203 mm) shell guns; Upper deck: 34 × 32 pdr guns; Quarter deck & Forecastle: 22 × 32 pdrs; 1 × 68 pdr gun

HMS James Watt was a 91-gun, second-rate, screw-powered Agamemnon-class ship of the line built for the Royal Navy during the 1850s. Completed in 1854, she played a minor role in the Baltic campaigns of 1854 and 1855 during the Crimean War of 1854–1856. The ship later served with the Channel Squadron and the Mediterranean Fleet. James Watt was paid off for the last time in 1862 and was sold for scrap in 1875.

== Description ==
James Watt measured 230 feet 3 inches (70.2 m) on the gundeck and 194 feet 6 inches (59.3 m) on the keel. She had a beam of 55 feet 5 inches (16.9 m), a depth of hold of 24 feet 8 inches (7.5 m), a deep draught of 19 feet 8 inches (5.99 m) and had a tonnage of 3082 79/94 tons burthen. The ship was fitted with a four-cylinder, single-expansion steam engine built by Boulton & Watt that was rated at 600 nominal horsepower and drove a single propeller shaft. James Watts' boilers provided enough steam to give the engine 1,543 indicated horsepower (1,151 kW) that was good for a speed of 9.4 knots (17.4 km/h; 10.8 mph) during her sea trials on 30 March 1855. Their crew numbered 860 officers and ratings.

The ships had three masts and was ship-rigged. To reduce drag and improve performance under sail, the Agamemnons could hoist their propeller into the hull and retract the telescoping funnel. The ships were regarded as very manoeuverable for steamships, able to match sailing ships in their ability to tack and wear with precision. Captain Geoffrey Hornby regarded the sailing qualities of his Edgar as "superb" in a letter to his wife on 9 June 1863.

The ships' muzzle-loading, smoothbore armament consisted of thirty-four 8 in (203 mm) shell guns on their lower gundeck and thirty-four 32-pounder (56 cwt) guns (Note: "Cwt" is the abbreviation for hundredweight, 56 cwt referring to the weight of the gun.) on their upper gundeck. Between their forecastle and quarterdeck, they carried twenty-two 32-pounder (45 cwt) guns. The single 68-pounder gun was positioned on the forecastle as a pivot gun so that it could serve as a bow chaser.

== Construction and career ==
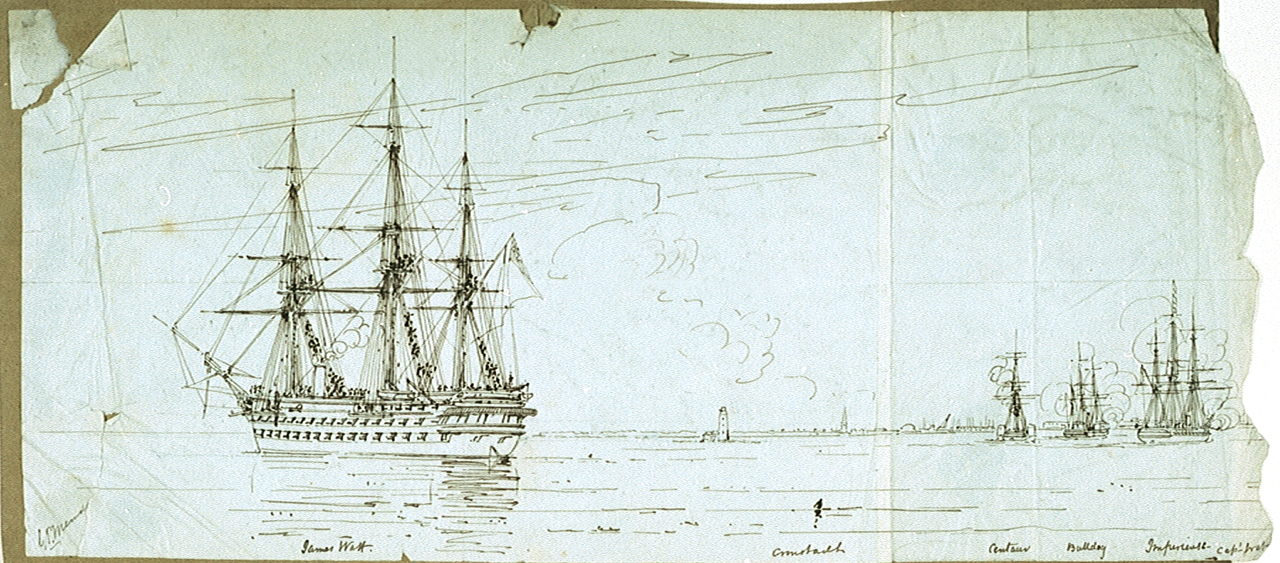
James Watt (on the left) off Kronstadt, with Centaur, Bulldog and Imperieuse in action near the Tolboukin lighthouse, 16 August 1855

James Watt was originally ordered on 25 April 1847 under the name of Audacious as a screw-powered, 80-gun, second-rate ship of the line that was intended to use the engines of the paddle frigate Vulcan after that ship had been converted into a troopship. She was renamed on 18 November in honour of James Watt, the only ship of that name to serve in the Royal Navy. Although the initial design was dated 16 December, it was not approved until 14 June 1849. She was reclassified while under construction on 26 March 1851 as a 91-gun second rate. The ship was laid down in September 1850 at Pembroke Dock, launched on 23 April 1853 and was later towed to HM Dockyard, Devonport, to have her propulsion machinery installed. James Watt was commissioned on 20 January 1854 by Captain George Elliot, and completed on 27 March.

The decisive Russian victory in the Battle of Sinop over the Ottoman Navy on 30 November 1853 alarmed politicians in both Britain and France. They decided to intervene on the side of the Ottomans and the British began forming a Baltic Fleet in February 1854 in anticipation of war. The Russians did not withdraw their forces in the Balkans as demanded by the British and French governments on 27 February and declarations of war by both governments followed a month later. Admiral Sir Charles Napier, commander-in-chief of the Baltic Fleet, was charged to blockade the exit from the Baltic Sea and all of the Russian ports therein. James Watt is known to have been with the fleet by 13 June when the bulk of the French contingent rendezvoused with the British fleet. The ship did not participate in any of the minor actions in 1854 and was part of the force based near Nargen Island (now Naissaar) blockading Reval (now Tallinn) and the southern coast of the Gulf of Finland by late 1854. By 19 October, bad weather had forced the ships to withdraw to Kiel, Germany, where they blockaded the entrance to the Baltic Sea until December when they were ordered home. Her second-hand propulsion machinery was found to be unsatisfactory, requiring repeated repairs.

The ship returned to the Baltic in early 1855. In August James Watt was present at Kronstadt, the major Russian naval base in the Baltic, along with the steam frigate Imperieuse, the paddle frigate Centaur and the paddle sloop Bulldog and was peripherally involved in a minor long-range engagement near the Tolbukhin lighthouse with the port's gun batteries and gunboats on 16 August.

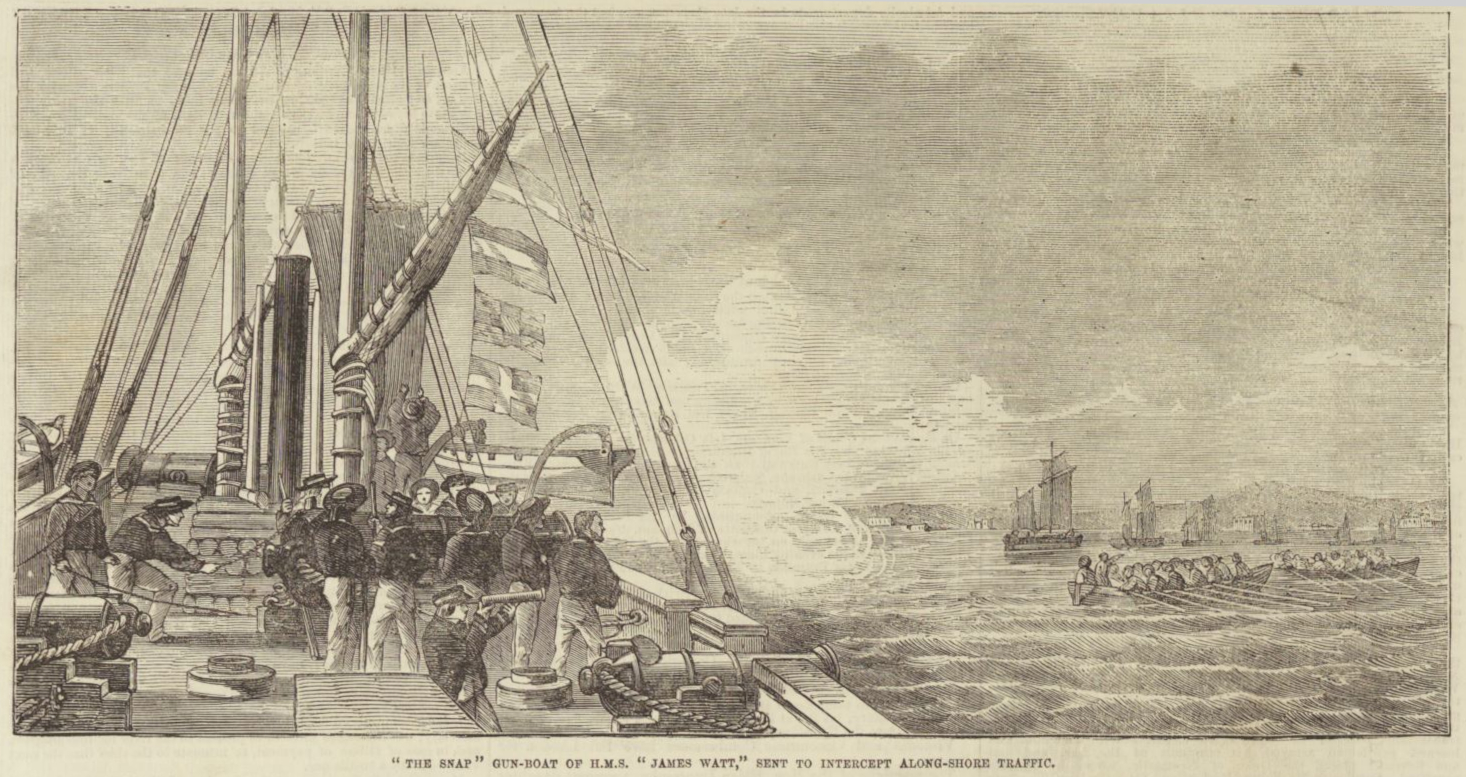
'The Snap' Gun-Boat of James Watt, sent to intercept coastal traffic early 1855, in the Baltic

Captain Talavera Anson relieved Elliot on 23 May 1856; the ship was paid off on 23 April 1857. James Watt was recommissioned on 19 March 1859 by Captain Edward Codd for service with the Channel Squadron before being transferred to the Mediterranean Fleet. She was paid off on 21 June 1862 and was subsequently sold for scrap on 23 January 1875 to Henry Castle & Sons to be broken up at Charlton.
