= List of shipwrecks in May 1861 =

The list of shipwrecks in May 1861 includes ships sunk, foundered, grounded, or otherwise lost during May 1861.

== 1 May ==
List of shipwrecks: 1 May 1861
Ship	State	Description
Kepler	United Kingdom	The ship was wrecked on the Ponta de Cabra Rocks, off São Miguel Island, Azores. Her crew were rescued. She was on a voyage from Kurrachee, India to London.
Marion	United Kingdom	The ship was driven ashore at Cock Point, Province of Canada, British North America. She was on a voyage from the Clyde to Quebec City, Province of Canada.
Marion	United Kingdom	The leaky barque was run ashore in Morris Bay, Antigua. She was on a voyage from Barbados to London.
Mine	Prussia	The galeas was wrecked on the Hatter Reef, 4.5 nautical miles (8.3 km) off Kalundborg, Sweden. Her crew were rescued. She was on a voyage from Hull, Yorkshire, United Kingdom to Rostock.
Minnie Dawson	United Kingdom	The ship was driven ashore and wrecked at Father Point, Province of Canada. She was on a voyage from Liverpool, Lancashire to Montreal, Province of Canada.
Paliburn	Norway	The schooner was driven ashore and wrecked on Düne, Heligoland. Her crew were rescued. She was on a voyage from Middlesbrough, Yorkshire, United Kingdom to Kronstadt, Russia.
Powerful	United Kingdom	The ship struck rocks at Cock Point and was damaged. She was on a voyage from Liverpool to Quebec City. She had been sunk by ice by 4 May. Her crew were rescued by Columbia (United Kingdom).
Salonica	United Kingdom	The ship was driven ashore at Father Point.
Spartan	United Kingdom	The ship was driven ashore at Father Point.

== 2 May ==
List of shipwrecks: 2 May 1861
Ship	State	Description
Montague	United Kingdom	The steamship was driven ashore on Arranmore, County Donegal. She was on a voyage from Westport, County Mayo to Liverpool, Lancashire.She was refloated the next day and taken in to Rutland, County Donegal

== 3 May ==
List of shipwrecks: 3 May 1861
Ship	State	Description
Emily	United Kingdom	The ship ran aground at Torquay, Devon. She was on a voyage from Hartlepool, County Durham to Torquay. Whilst aground, she was run into by Duchess of Beaufort (United Kingdom).
Ryhope	United Kingdom	The steamship ran aground at Sunderland, County Durham. her crew were rescued. She was on a voyage from London to Sunderland. She was refloated on 6 May and taken in to Sunderland.

== 4 May ==
List of shipwrecks: 4 May 1861
Ship	State	Description
HMS Avon	Royal Navy	The survey ship ran aground off The Needles, Isle of Wight. Subsequently refloated, repaired and returned to service.
Condor	United Kingdom	The ship ran ashore at Barcelona, Spain. Her crew were rescued.
Glen Cove	Confederate States of America	The 504-ton sidewheel paddle steamer burned on the James River in Virginia.
Royal William	United Kingdom	The collier, a brig, ran aground on the Medem Sand. She was on a voyage from Hamburg to Sunderland, County Durham. She was refloated on 8 May and taken in to Cuxhaven.
Sea Nymph	United States	The 1,215-ton medium clipper sank at Point Reyes, California, with the loss of two lives. She was on a voyage from New York to San Francisco, California.

== 5 May ==
List of shipwrecks: 5 May 1861
Ship	State	Description
Commodore	United Kingdom	The ship was driven ashore and wrecked at Cuevas del Almanzora, Spain. She was on a voyage from Villaricos, Spain to Sulina, Ottoman Empire.
Condor	United Kingdom	The brig was wrecked at Barcelona, Spain. Her ten crew survived. She was on a voyage from Sunderland, County Durham to Barcelona.
D. C. Pierce	United States	American Civil War: The barque was sunk by Confederate rebels at Norfolk, Virginia.
CSS Dolly Webb	Confederate States Navy	The 139-ton sternwheel paddle steamer burned at Algiers in New Orleans, Louisiana.
J. O'Neill	Confederate States of America	American Civil War, Union blockade: The schooner′s crew ran her aground near Pamlico Sound, North Carolina, after which the screw steamer USS Valley City (United States Navy) captured her.

== 6 May ==
List of shipwrecks: 6 May 1861
Ship	State	Description
Baltic	Confederate States of America	The 604-ton sidewheel paddle steamer burned at Algiers in New Orleans, Louisiana.
British Queen	United Kingdom	The brig was sunk by ice off the coast of British North America. Her crew were rescued. She was on a voyage from Liverpool, Lancashire to Greenspond, Newfoundland, British North America.
Editor	United States	American Civil War: The 246-ton sternwheel paddle steamer was burned at Algiers in New Orleans, Louisiana, Confederate States of America.
General Pike	Confederate States of America	The 248-ton sidewheel paddle steamer burned at Algiers in New Orleans, Louisiana.
Grenada	Confederate States of America	The 217-ton sidewheel paddle steamer burned at Algiers in New Orleans, Louisiana.
Kattegat	Sweden	The steamship ran aground between "Monces" and "Falkenburg" and sank at the bow. All on board were rescued. She was on a voyage from Gothenburg to Copenhagen, Denmark and Lübeck.
Lydia Francis	United States	During a voyage from Cuba to New York City with a cargo of sugar, the brig was wrecked at Hatteras Cove, North Carolina, Confederate States of America.
St. George	United Kingdom	The brig was driven ashore and wrecked 15 nautical miles (28 km) south of Cape Bon, Algeria. She was on a voyage from Trieste to Falmouth, Cornwall.
Telegram	United States	American Civil War: The 205-ton sternwheel paddle steamer was burned at Algiers in New Orleans, Louisiana, Confederate States of America.

== 7 May ==
List of shipwrecks: 7 May 1861
Ship	State	Description
Asia	United Kingdom	The ship ran aground on the Newcombe Sand, in the North Sea off the coast of Suffolk. She was on a voyage from Hamburg to Sunderland, County Durham. She was refloated and taken in to Lowestoft, Suffolk.
Earl of Harewood	United Kingdom	The ship was holed by ice and sank off Harbour Grace, Newfoundland. Her crew were rescued by Globe (United Kingdom). Earl of Harewood was on a voyage from Liverpool, Lancashire to Harbour Grace.
Princeza de Joinville	Brazil	The steamship ran aground at the mouth of the Rio Grande. She was refloated and beached.
Jubilee	United Kingdom	The ship ran aground in the Java Sea. She was on a voyage from London to Shanghai, China. She was refloated with assistance from Maiden Queen (United Kingdom) and put in to Hong Kong.
Robert and Mary	United Kingdom	The ship ran aground on the Newcombe Sand and was run in to. She was on a voyage from Blyth, Northumberland to Rouen, Seine-Inférieure. She was refloated and taken in to Lowestoft.
Spectre	United Kingdom	The full-rigged ship struck a rock 6 nautical miles (11 km) south of "Guayacan", Chile and sank. All on board survived. She was on a voyage from Valparaíso to Guayacan.

== 8 May ==
List of shipwrecks: 8 May 1861
Ship	State	Description
Armsted	United Kingdom	The brig was wrecked between Sand Island and Pelican Island, Texas, Confederate States of America. She was on a voyage from Cartagena, Spain to Mobile, Alabama, Confederate States of America.
Osprey	United Kingdom	The ship was wrecked in the "Wedge of the Paraids". She was on a voyage from Saigon, French Cochinchina to Hong Kong.

== 9 May ==
List of shipwrecks: 9 May 1861
Ship	State	Description
David	United Kingdom	The pilot boat capsized at St Andrews, Fife. Her crew were rescued by the pilot boat Beeswing (United Kingdom).
Grey Eagle	United States	The 382-ton sidewheel paddle steamer struck a bridge on the Mississippi River at Rock Island, Illinois.
Raven	United Kingdom	The schooner was driven ashore at Ness Point, Suffolk. She was on a voyage from Whitstable, Kent to Hartlepool, County Durham. She was refloated the next day and taken in to Lowestoft, Suffolk.
St. George	United Kingdom	The ship was driven ashore at "Galipora", Beylik of Tunis. She was on a voyage from Trieste to Falmouth, Cornwall. She became a wreck on 11 May.

== 10 May ==
List of shipwrecks: 10 May 1861
Ship	State	Description
Conqueror	United States	The 398-ton sidewheel paddle steamer burned at New Orleans, Louisiana, Confederate States of America.
Hampshire	United Kingdom	The barque was wrecked at Ringkøbing, Denmark with the loss of all ten crew. She was on a voyage from a Baltic port to an English port.
Marvel	United Kingdom	The schooner ran aground at Whitby, Yorkshire. She was on a voyage from Port Dinorwic, Caernarfonshire to Whitby. She was refloated and taken in to Whitby.
Sarah Jane	United Kingdom	The ship ran aground on Neckmans Ground, in the Baltic Sea. She was on a voyage from Sunderland, County Durham to Kronstadt, Russia. She was refloated and completed her voyage in a leaky condition.
Standard	United Kingdom	The ship was sunk by ice off Seskar, Russia. Her crew were rescued. She was on a voyage from West Hartlepool, County Durham to Kronstadt, Russia.
Woodpecker	United Kingdom	Carrying a cargo of flour, general cargo, and 104 head of cattle to Victoria, British Columbia, the 300-ton schooner ran aground on Clatsop Spit at the entrance to the Columbia River on the coast of Oregon. After throwing the cargo overboard, the crew abandoned ship; only one of them made it to shore.

== 11 May ==
List of shipwrecks: 11 May 1861
Ship	State	Description
Equality	United States	The 90-ton sternwheel paddle steamer struck a snag and sank in the Ohio River at Golconda, Illinois.
James	(United Kingdom of Great Britain and Ireland) Jersey	The schooner was run down and sunk by the steamship Ada off Ailsa Craig. Her crew were rescued. She was on a voyage from Licata, Sicily, Italy to the Clyde.
Marchioness of Breadalbane	United Kingdom	The brig sprang a leak and sank in the North Sea. Her crew survived. She was on a voyage from Charleston, South Carolina, Confederate States of America to Bodø, Norway.

== 12 May ==
List of shipwrecks: 12 May 1861
Ship	State	Description
Danube	United Kingdom	The ship was driven ashore "on Roche a Veillans". She was on a voyage from the Clyde to Quebec City. She was consequently condemned
Dolphin	United Kingdom	The ship ran aground on the White Island Reef, in the Saint Lawrence River. She was on a voyage from Sunderland, County Durham to Quebec City, Province of Canada, British North America. She had broken up by 25 May.
Fairy	United Kingdom	The schooner foundered in the Firth of Forth. Her crew were rescued by a Dutch galiot. She was on a voyage from Scrabster, Caithness to Sunderland.
Heinrich	Grand Duchy of Mecklenburg-Schwerin	The brig was driven ashore at Rønne, Denmark. She was on a voyage from Danzig to Limerick, United Kingdom. She was refloated.
Marie	Kingdom of Hanover	The schooner was driven ashore and wrecked at Rønne. Her crew were rescued. She was on a voyage from Danzig to Amsterdam, North Holland, Netherlands.
Providence	France	The lugger struck rocks and was damaged. She was on a voyage from Dunkirk, Nord to "Port Janusz". She consequently put in to Roscoff, Finistère in a leaky condition.
Royal Bride	United Kingdom	The barque was sunk by ice off Newfoundland, British North America. Her crew were rescued. She was on a voyage from Swansea, Glamorgan to Montreal, Province of Canada.
Union	United Kingdom	The ship ran aground on the Castle Rock, in Douglas Bay. She was refloated on 15 May.

== 13 May ==
List of shipwrecks: 13 May 1861
Ship	State	Description
Leander	United Kingdom	The square was wrecked at "Brantwik". Her six crew survived. She was on a voyage from Danzig to Sandwich, Kent.
Nordstjernen	Flag unknown	The ship foundered in the Atlantic Ocean. Her crew were rescued. She was on a voyage from New York, United States to a British port.
Warlock	United Kingdom	The ship foundered off Sanday, Inner Hebrides. Her crew were rescued. She was on a voyage from Glasgow, Renfrewshire to Oban, Argyllshire.

== 14 May ==
List of shipwrecks: 14 May 1861
Ship	State	Description
Christiana Ken	United States	American Civil War: The schooner ran aground and was burned by Confederate forces near Upper Machodoc Creek, Virginia, Confederate States of America.
Lindisfarne	United Kingdom	The brig collided with the steamship Elbana and sank in the Irish Sea off The Skerries, Anglesey. She was on a voyage from Liverpool, Lancashire to Paraíba, Brazil.

== 15 May ==
List of shipwrecks: 15 May 1861
Ship	State	Description
Carthage	United Kingdom	The ship was driven ashore. Her crew were rescued. She was on a voyage from London to Quebec City, Province of Canada, British North America.
Commerce	United Kingdom	The ship was wrecked on Anticosti Island, Nova Scotia, British North America. Her crew were rescued. She was on a voyage from Liverpool, Lancashire to Quebec City.
Herald	United Kingdom	The steamship struck the Ridge Rock and was damaged. She was on a voyage from Dublin to Glasgow, Renfrewshire. She was later refloated and taken in to Belfast, County Antrim.
Lindisfarne	United Kingdom	The ship collided with a steamship and sank in the Irish Sea off The Skerries, Anglesey. Her crew were rescued. She was on a voyage from Paraíba, Brazil to Liverpool, Lancashire.
Lord Warriston	United Kingdom	The ship was driven ashore on Anticosti Island. Her crew were rescued. She was on a voyage from Quebec City to Liverpool. She was consequently condemned.
Phoenix	United Kingdom	The ship sank. She was on a voyage from Antwerp, Belgium to Quebec City.
Robert Burns	United Kingdom	The ship was sunk by ice with the loss of all but two of her crew. Survivors were rescued by Symmetry (United Kingdom). Robert Burns was on a voyage from Cardiff, Glamorgan to Quebec City.
HMS Victor Emmanuel	Royal Navy	The Agamemnon-class ship of the line ran aground on the Leufchino Shoal, in the Mediterranean Sea. Subsequently refloated, repaired and returned to service.

== 16 May ==
List of shipwrecks: 16 May 1861
Ship	State	Description
Catharina	Netherlands	The ship ran aground on the Gelb Sand, in the North Sea. She was on a voyage from Amsterdam, North Holland to Stettin. She was refloated and taken in to Cuxhaven in a leaky condition.
Celestina	United Kingdom	The ship ran aground at South Shields, County Durham. She was on a voyage from Whitby, Yorkshire to Hull, Yorkshire. She was refloated the next day and towed in to South Shields.
Margaret Wilson	United Kingdom	The barque struck a rock and sank in Loch Ness 4 nautical miles (7.4 km) from Fort Augustus, Inverness-shire. She was on a voyage from Leith Lothian to Londonderry.

== 17 May ==
List of shipwrecks: 17 May 1861
Ship	State	Description
Indian Chief	United Kingdom	The ship was holed by her anchor and sank at New York, United States. She was on a voyage from New York to Queenstown, County Cork. She had been refloated by 22 May.

== 18 May ==
List of shipwrecks: 18 May 1861
Ship	State	Description
Ida Lilly	United Kingdom	The ship was driven ashore on the Mull of Kintyre, Argyllshire. She was on a voyage from New York, United States to Glasgow, Renfrewshire.
Johanne	(Denmark) Duchy of Schleswig	The ship foundered off Læsø, Denmark. Her crew were rescued. She was on a voyage from Danzig to an English port.
Prince Albert	United Kingdom	The ship was driven ashore and wrecked on the Green Island Reef, in the Saint Lawrence River. She was on a voyage from Newcastle upon Tyne, Northumberland to Quebec City, Province of Canada, British North America.

== 19 May ==
List of shipwrecks: 29 May 1861
Ship	State	Description
USS Baltimore	United States Navy	American Civil War: The paddle steamer ran aground at the mouth of the Potomac River. She was attacked by a Confederate States Navy ram with the loss of nine lives. She was refloated with assistance from USS Mount Vernon (United States Navy).
Franklin	United States	The Brig ran ground on Conch Reef, Florida and was wrecked.
Victor	Sweden	The schooner was driven ashore on Skagen, Denmark and was damaged. Her crew were rescued. She was on a voyage from Newcastle upon Tyne, Northumberland, United Kingdom to Stockholm. Victor was refloated on 25 May and taken in to Fredrikshavn, Denmark.

== 20 May ==
List of shipwrecks: 20 May 1861
Ship	State	Description
William Reed	United Kingdom	The barque was driven ashore and wrecked at "Toonby", Denmark. Her crew were rescued. She was on a voyage from Newcastle upon Tyne, Northumberland to Kronstadt, Russia.

== 21 May ==
List of shipwrecks: 21 May 1861
Ship	State	Description
Lockwood	United Kingdom	The ship was driven ashore and wrecked at Garrucha, Spain. Her crew were rescued.
Louise	United Kingdom	The ship was driven ashore and wrecked at Rønne, Denmark. Her crew were rescued. She was on a voyage from Skive, Denmark to an English port.
Victor	Flag unknown	The schooner was driven ashore on Skagen, Denmark.

== 22 May ==
List of shipwrecks: 22 May 1861
Ship	State	Description
Jobb	Russia	The schooner sank at Riga.

== 23 May ==
List of shipwrecks: 23 May 1861
Ship	State	Description
General Taylor	Confederate States of America	The ship was destroyed by fire at the mouth of the Mississippi River. She was on a voyage from New Orleans, Louisiana to Bordeaux, Gironde, France.
St. Helena	United Kingdom	The ship ran aground on Scroby Sands, Norfolk. She was refloated and taken in to Great Yarmouth, Norfolk.
Sympathy	United Kingdom	The ship ran aground at Hunsley Head, Northumberland and sank. Her crew were rescued. She was on a voyage from Goole, Yorkshire to Amble, Northumberland.

== 24 May ==
List of shipwrecks: 24 May 1861
Ship	State	Description
Anna Maria	Flag unknown	The ship foundered in the Atlantic Ocean off the Isles of Scilly, United Kingdom. Her crew were rescued. She was on a voyage from Brăila, Ottoman Empire to Falmouth, Cornwall, United Kingdom.
Indus	United Kingdom	The ship was driven ashore and wrecked on Heligoland. Her crew were rescued. She was on a voyage from Hartlepool, County Durham to Hamburg.
Melazzo	United Kingdom	The steamship was run ashore at Saint Petersburg, Russia. She was on a voyage from Kronstadt, Russia to Pillau, Prussia.
Mina	France	The brig was wrecked near Algeciras, Spain. She was on a voyage from Alexandria, Egypt to Dunkirk, Nord.
Polar Star	United States	The ship was wrecked in the Sea of Okhotsk on the west coast of the Kamchatka Peninsula during a dense fog and gale. The first mate and a boat′s crew were lost in attempting to get ashore. The rest of the crew were saved by the bark Alice and the ship Oliver Crocker (both United States).

== 25 May ==
List of shipwrecks: 25 May 1861
Ship	State	Description
Delhi	United Kingdom	The barque was driven ashore south of Algeciras, Spain. She was on a voyage from Malta to Queenstown, County Cork.
Medford	United States	The ship arrived at Faial Island, Azores in a leaky condition. She was consequently condemned.
Miami	United States	The barque was wrecked in McDonnell Bay, South Australia.

== 26 May ==
List of shipwrecks: 26 May 1861
Ship	State	Description
Emilie	Stettin	The ship ran aground off Hirtshals, Denmark. She was on a voyage from Hartlepool, County Durham, United Kingdom to Stettin. She was refloated the next day and resumed her voyage.

== 27 May ==
List of shipwrecks: 27 May 1861
Ship	State	Description
Avontour	United Kingdom	The ship was driven ashore and wrecked on "Gryst", Prussia. She was on a voyage from London to Stettin.
William Owens	United Kingdom	The ship was wrecked at Benin City, Dahomey. She was on a voyage from Liverpool, Lancashire to Benin City.

== 28 May ==
List of shipwrecks: 28 May 1861
Ship	State	Description
RMS Zulu	United Kingdom	The steamship struck a rock off the east coast of Jamaica and was wrecked. All on board survived. She was on a voyage from Jamaica to New York. United States.
Unidentified schooner	Confederate States of America	American Civil War, Union blockade: The schooner was captured and destroyed in the Potomac River, probably by the armed tug USS Resolute (United States Navy).

== 29 May ==
List of shipwrecks: 29 May 1861
Ship	State	Description
Ægeus	United Kingdom	The barque was abandoned in the Atlantic Ocean. Her crew were rescued by the brig Britius (United Kingdom). Ægeus was on a voyage from Newcastle upon Tyne, Northumberland to Montevideo, Uruguay.

== 30 May ==
List of shipwrecks: 30 May 1861
Ship	State	Description
Urchin	United Kingdom	The schooner ran aground on the Goodwin Sands, Kent. She was on a voyage from Newcastle upon Tyne, Northumberland to Plymouth, Devon. She was refloated and put in to Ramsgate, Kent.

== 31 May ==
List of shipwrecks: 31 May 1861
Ship	State	Description
J. Nickerson	United Kingdom	The ship was wrecked off Tenerife, Canary Islands. She was on a voyage from Lisbon, Portugal to Rio de Janeiro, Brazil.

== Unknown date ==
List of shipwrecks: Unknown May 1861
Ship	State	Description
Albion	United Kingdom	The ship was wrecked at Cape Henry, Virginia, confederate States of America due to a false light being shown. She was on a voyage from Cardiff, Glamorgan to Baltimore, Maryland, United States.
Apostol	Spain	The steamship was driven ashore before 6 May. She was on a voyage from Cádiz to Vigo.
Bedouin	United Kingdom	The ship was abandoned in the Atlantic Ocean. She was on a voyage from New York, United States to Galway.
Bothnia	United Kingdom	The ship was wrecked on the Main Cape Reef. She was on a voyage from London to the Wanks River.
Chippewa	United States	The 173-ton sidewheel paddle steamer caught fire on the Missouri River on a Sunday evening in May 1861 after drunken deckhands tipped over a candle while tapping barrels of whiskey. The steamer was run ashore, allowing its passengers to flee, then turned and drifted downriver for a mile (1.6 km) before gunpowder she was carrying as part of her cargo exploded and destroyed her 15 miles (24 km) below the mouth of the Poplar River in Dakota Territory.
Cosgrove	United Kingdom	The ship ran aground on the White Island Reef, in the Saint Lawrence River before 24 May. She was on a voyage from Hartlepool, County Durham to Montreal, Province of Canada, British North America. She was refloated and taken in to Quebec City, Province of Canada.
D. C. Pearce	Confederate States of America	American Civil War: The barque was scuttled as a blockship at Norfolk, Virginia.
Dundee	United Kingdom	The ship was sunk by ice in British North American waters.
Edgar P. Stringer	Confederate States of America	The ship foundered in the Atlantic Ocean before 31 May. Her crew survived. She was on a voyage from Newport, Virginia to Madras, India.
Huna	United Kingdom	The barque was holed by ice in British North American waters before 18 May.
Jane	United Kingdom	The ship was sunk by ice in British North American waters before 4 May. Her crew were rescued by the steamship Columbia (United Kingdom) Jane was on a voyage from Liverpool, Lancashire to Quebec City.
Madras	United Kingdom	The ship was driven ashore "in the Pilgrims" between 1 and 18 May. She was on a voyage from Liverpool to Quebec City.
Matilda	United Kingdom	The ship was sunk by ice in the Atlantic Ocean before 28 May. Her crew were rescued by Heatherbell and Jane (both United Kingdom). Matilda was on a voyage from London to Montreal.
Mina	United Kingdom	The ship was driven ashore near Algeciras, Spain.
Palestine	United Kingdom	The ship was abandoned in the Atlantic Ocean. She was on a voyage from New York to Liverpool.
Roelfina	Netherlands	The ship was wrecked at Sfântu Gheorghe, Ottoman Empire before 21 May.
Salacia	United Kingdom	The barque was driven ashore in the Saint Lawrence River at "St. Havre" and became severely hogged. She was refloated on 30 May and towed in to a port.
Secret	United Kingdom	The ship was sunk by ice off Newfoundland before 4 May. Her crew took to a boat, and were rescued seven days later by True Blue (United Kingdom). Secret was on a voyage from London to Saint John's, Newfoundland.
Spartan	United Kingdom	The ship was driven ashore and severely damaged at Dock Point, Province of Canada. She was on a voyage from Liverpool to Quebec City.
Squirrel	United Kingdom	The brig was driven ashore and wrecked at Lowestoft, Suffolk before 11 May.
Symmetry	United Kingdom	The schooner ran aground on a reef off Naguabo, Puerto Rico. She was on a voyage from Hull, Yorkshire to Puerto Rico. She was refloated and put in to Saint Thomas, Virgin Islands for repairs. She arrived on 5 May.
Tweed	(United Kingdom of Great Britain and Ireland) British Guiana	The drogher ran aground before 7 May. She was on a voyage from Demerara to Berbice.
Unico	United Kingdom	The ship ran aground at Carrickfergus, County Antrim. She was on a voyage from New Orleans, Louisiana, Confederate States of America to Belfast, County Antrim. She was refloated and completed her voyage, arriving on 14 May.
Union	United Kingdom	The whaler sank during May. Her crew survived.
