= HMS Victor Emmanuel =

Ship of the line of the Royal Navy

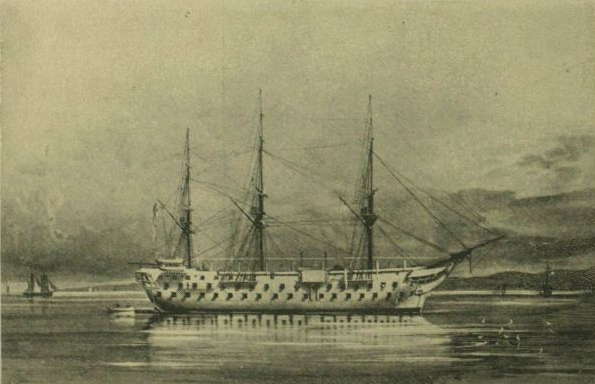
- Victor Emmanuel, receiving-ship. British squadron China Station, 1897

History

United Kingdom
- Name: Victor Emmanuel
- Ordered: 4 April 1851
- Builder: Pembroke Dockyard
- Laid down: 16 May 1853
- Launched: 27 February 1855
- Completed: 9 September 1858
- Commissioned: 27 July 1858
- Decommissioned: 30 September 1897
- Renamed: Launched as Repulse; Renamed Victor Emmanuel, 7 December 1855
- Reclassified: Hospital and receiving ship from 1873
- Fate: Sold, 1899

General characteristics (as built)
- Class & type: 91-gun, second-rate Agamemnon-class ship of the line
- Tons burthen: 3,085 58/94 bm
- Length: 230 ft 3 in (70.2 m) (overall)
- Beam: 55 ft 4 in (16.9 m)
- Draught: 19 ft 8 in (6.0 m)
- Depth of hold: 24 ft 6 in (7.5 m)
- Installed power: 2,424 ihp (1,808 kW)
- Propulsion: 1 screw; 1 single-expansion steam engine
- Sail plan: Full-rigged ship
- Speed: 10.7 knots (19.8 km/h; 12.3 mph)
- Complement: 860
- Armament: 91 muzzle-loading, smoothbore guns: Lower deck: 34 × 8 in (203 mm) shell guns; Upper deck: 34 × 32 pdrs; Quarter deck & Forecastle: 22 × 32 pdrs; 1 × 68 pdr

HMS Victor Emmanuel was a 91-gun, second-rate, steam-powered Agamemnon-class ship of the line built for the Royal Navy during the 1850s. Completed in 1858, she initially served with the Channel Squadron and then with the Mediterranean Fleet before being paid off in 1862. Victor Emmanuel was converted into a hospital ship in 1873 for the Third Ashanti War. She was transferred to the Hong Kong Station the following year where she served as a receiving ship and flagship of the Commodore-in-Charge, Hong Kong. Paid off in 1897, the ship was sold out of service in 1899.

== Description ==
The Agamemnon-class ships of the line were built in response to the perceived threat from France by the construction of the Napoléon-class battleships. Victor Emmanuel measured 230 feet 3 inches (70.2 m) on the gundeck and 195 feet 4 inches (59.5 m) on the keel. She had a beam of 55 feet 4 inches (16.9 m), a depth of hold of 24 feet 6 inches (7.5 m), a deep draught of 19 feet 8 inches (5.99 m) and had a tonnage of 3,085 58/94 tons burthen. The ship was fitted with a two-cylinder, single-expansion steam engine built by Maudslay, Sons and Field that was rated at 600 nominal horsepower and drove a single propeller shaft. During her sea trials on 28 November 1856, Victor Emmanuel's boilers provided enough steam for the engine to produce 2,424 indicated horsepower (1,808 kW) that was good for a speed of 11.9 knots (22.0 km/h; 13.7 mph). In service she achieved 10.7 knots (19.8 km/h; 12.3 mph). The crew numbered 860 officers and ratings.

The ships had three masts and was ship-rigged. To reduce drag and improve performance under sail, the Agamemnons could hoist their propeller into the hull and retract the telescoping funnel. The ships were regarded as very manoeuverable for steamships, able to match sailing ships in their ability to tack and wear with precision. Captain Geoffrey Hornby regarded the sailing qualities of his Edgar as "superb" in a letter to his wife on 9 June 1863.

The ships' muzzle-loading, smoothbore armament consisted of thirty-four 8 in (203 mm) shell guns on their lower gundeck and thirty-four 32-pounder (56 cwt) guns (Note: "Cwt" is the abbreviation for hundredweight, 56 cwt referring to the weight of the gun.) on their upper gundeck. Between their forecastle and quarterdeck, they carried twenty-two 32-pounder (45 cwt) guns. The single 68-pounder gun was positioned on the forecastle as a pivot gun so that it could serve as a bow chaser.

== Construction and career ==
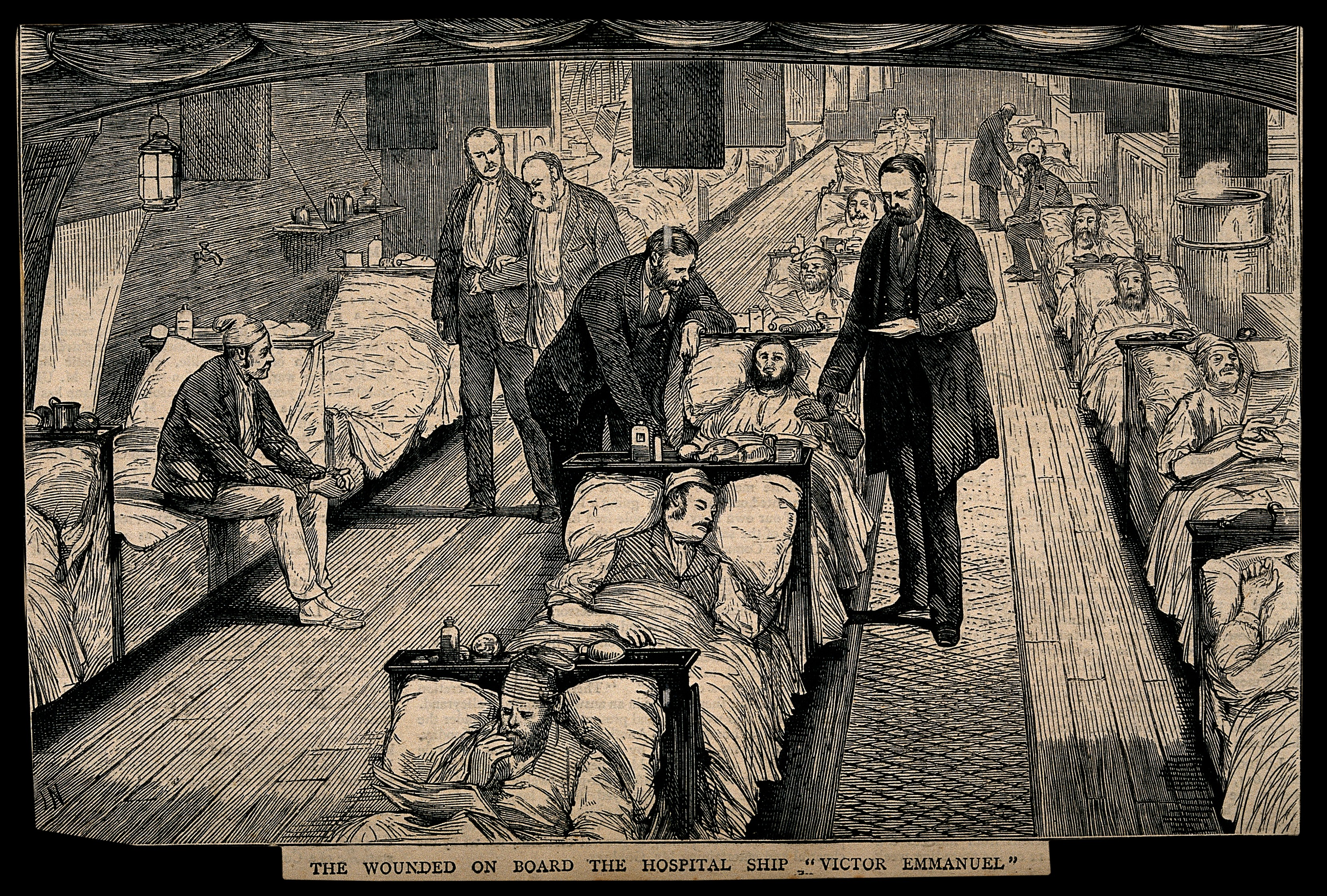
The Victor Emmanuel Hospital Ship; doctors checking on their patients

The Agamemnons were originally designed as 80-gun sailing two-deckers, but the design was revised in 1850 to incorporate more guns and steam power. Victor Emmanuel was ordered on 4 April 1851 as a 80-gun second rate under the name Repulse, but was re-rated as a 91-gun ship on 15 November 1852. She was laid down at HM Dockyard, Pembroke, on 16 May 1853. The ship was launched on 27 February 1855, but was renamed Victor Emmanuel on 7 December in honour of the King of Sardinia, Victor Emmanuel, after he visited the ship. Victor Emmanuel remains the only ship of her name to serve in the Royal Navy. She was commissioned on 27 July 1858 under the command of Captain James Willcox and completed on 9 September.

Victor Emmanuel was initially assigned to the Channel Squadron, but was transferred to the Mediterranean Fleet in March 1859. Captain William Clifford relieved Willcox on 11 November. By 3 December 1860, the ship was already noted as having some problems with rotten timbers. On 4 May 1861, the ship ran aground on the Leufchino Shoal, in the Mediterranean Sea, but was only lightly damaged. Her armament was reduced to 79 guns during this deployment; she was paid off at HM Dockyard, Portsmouth, on 6 May 1862. Lieutenant Edward St John Daniel, who had been awarded the Victoria Cross for heroism during the Crimean War of 1854–1855, joined Victor Emmanuel in January 1861, "but jumped ship at Corfu, Greece, on 27 June shortly after being placed under arrest 'for taking indecent liberties with junior officers' (a euphemism for sodomy)". Queen Victoria issued a warrant of forfeiture on 4 September, making him the only officer to forfeit his award.

The ship was recommissioned on 20 November 1873 at Portsmouth by Captain George Parkin to serve as a 240-bed hospital ship at Cape Coast Castle during the Third Ashanti War. Parkin was mentioned in dispatches after the war. Victor Emmanuel was assigned to Hong Kong to replace Princess Charlotte as the receiving ship there from 11 December 1874. By July 1875 Victor Emmanuel was under the command of the Commodore-in-Charge, Hong Kong, Commodore John Parish. He was succeeded by Commodore George Watson on 1 March 1876 and Commodore Thomas Smith relieved Watson in March 1879. Commodore William Cuming assumed command of the ship on 2 May 1881.

Victor Emmanuel was recommissioned at Malta on 14 February 1884 by Commodore George Morant and remained under his command for the next three years. Commodore William Maxwell succeeded him on 12 February 1887. Commodore Edmund Church assumed command of the ship on 27 December 1888. The ship, still at Hong Kong, was temporarily fitted with a time ball in March 1892 until an observatory could be built. Commodore Henry Palliser relieved Church in command of Victor Emmanuel on 29 December 1891. Commodore George Boyes assumed command of the ship on 20 June 1893. Commodore Swinton Holland was to be the last captain of Victor Emmanuel and he relieved Boyes on 8 July 1896. The ship was paid off on 30 September 1897 and was sold in 1899.

== Citations ==
Preceded by HMS Princess Charlotte	Royal Navy receiving ship in Hong Kong; 1873–1899	Succeeded by HMS Tamar
