= HMS Tamar (1863) =

1863 Royal Navy troopship

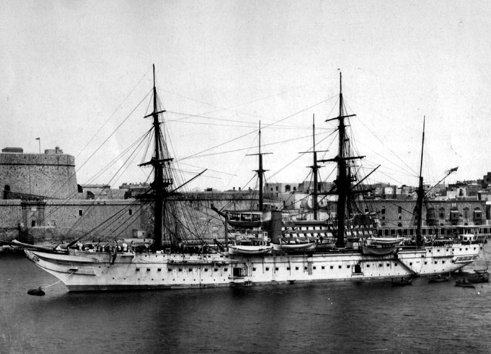
- HMS Tamar at Malta, 1882

History

United Kingdom
- Name: HMS Tamar
- Builder: Samuda Brothers
- Launched: June 1863
- Fate: Scuttled off old Wan Chai Ferry Pier (near today's Hong Kong Convention and Exhibition Centre), Hong Kong, 12 December 1941

General characteristics
- Type: Troopship
- Displacement: 4,650 tons
- Tons burthen: 2,812 bm
- Length: 320 ft (98 m)
- Beam: 45 ft (14 m)
- Propulsion: 1 propeller; 500 hp (373 kW) steam plant
- Sail plan: Barque rigged
- Speed: 12 knots (22 km/h; 14 mph)
- Armament: 3 guns

HMS Tamar was a Royal Navy troopship built by the Samuda Brothers at Cubitt Town, London, and launched in Britain in 1863. She served as a supply ship from 1897 to 1941, and gave her name to the shore station HMS Tamar in Hong Kong (1897 to 1997).

== History ==
The 1863 incarnation of HMS Tamar was the fourth to bear that name, which is derived from the River Tamar, in Cornwall, and the ship's crest is based on its coat of arms. Built in Cubitt Town in East London, she was launched in June 1863, and began her maiden voyage on 12 January 1864 as a troopship to the Cape and China. On 13 December 1866, Tamar ran aground off Haulbowline, County Cork. Tamar was refloated on 17 December. On 18 October 1869, she ran aground off Paul's Island, Newfoundland Colony. Repairs cost £62. One of her officers was blamed for the grounding.

Tamar was dual-powered with masts and a steam engine, giving a speed of 12 knots (22 km/h; 14 mph). She originally had two funnels, but she was re-equipped with a more advanced boiler and reduced to one funnel.

In 1874, she formed part of the Naval Brigade that helped to defeat the Ashanti in West Africa, during the Ashanti War. On 7 April 1875, she ran aground whilst departing from Kingstown, County Dublin. She was refloated and resumed her voyage. On 15 April, she ran aground at Chatham, Kent. She was refloated with assistance. On 7 November 1876, Tamar was driven ashore at St. Catherine's Point, Bermuda. She was on a voyage from an English port to Bermuda. Her troops were taken off. She was refloated 12 hours later. Tamar took part in the Zulu War in 1879 and off Egypt in 1882.

In 1879, The British Medical Journal reported a group of sailors aboard Tamar were poisoned by a bad pigeon pie which spawned an Admiralty investigation.

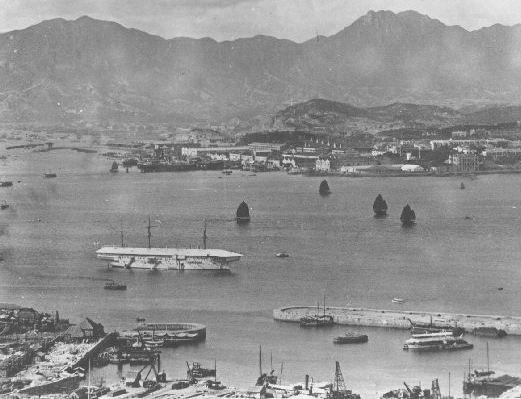
HMS Tamar (white vessel) anchored off the Naval Dockyard (1905)

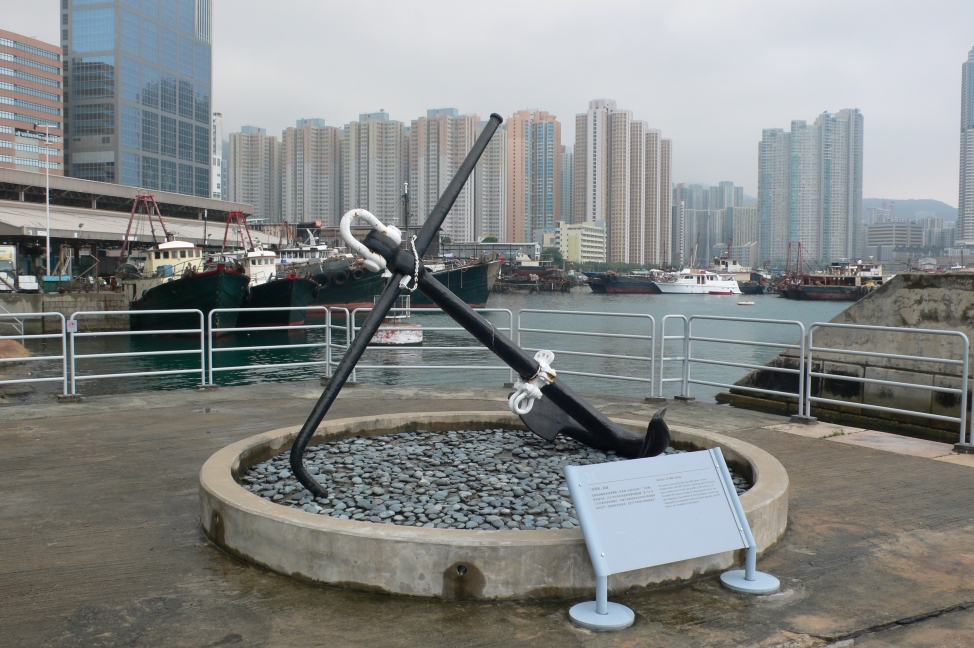
The purported anchor of HMS Tamar, located at the Hong Kong Museum of Coastal Defence

In 1897 Tamar was hulked as a base ship and relieved HMS Victor Emmanuel as the Hong Kong receiving ship. She was used as a base ship until replaced by the shore station, which was named HMS Tamar, after the ship.

Tamar had been towed out to a buoy on 8 December during the Battle of Hong Kong during World War II. Amidst a curfew of darkness and bombardment by the Imperial Japanese forces, the orders came at 2100 hours on 11 December to scuttle her. She was scuttled at the buoy on 12 December 1941 once it was clear that the advance could not be arrested, to avoid being used by the invading Japanese forces. As the ship's superstructure became airlocked, the ship refused to sink for some time, until the Royal Artillery was called in to administer the coup de grâce.

Over the years, legends state that a mast from the ship was erected outside Murray House in Stanley, and that wood planks salvaged from the ship were turned into the main doors of St. John's Cathedral in the city's Central district. The veracity of both legends, however, has been challenged.

In late 2014, during dredging work for the Central–Wan Chai Bypass, the remains of what strongly appears to be Tamar were discovered at the location of the old Wan Chai Ferry Pier where she is believed to have been scuttled. A government report, completed in September 2015 but released on the government's website in February 2017, finds strong evidence that the remains are those of Tamar.

== Figurehead ==
The figurehead of HMS Tamar – named after the River Tamar that runs between Devon and Cornwall - depicts a bearded river god and is believed to be linked to the legend of Tamara, a water nymph.

=== Local folklore ===
In local folklore, water nymph Tamara was spotted frolicking in nature upon Dartmoor by two giants, Torridge and Tavy, who desired her affection. Upon finding his daughter with the giants, her father cast them into a deep slumber, enraging Tamara who he turned into a stream in a fit of anger. The stream eventually grew to become the River Tamar. Upon waking, both giants were turned into rivers by their own fathers - the River Torridge, which flows through Devon, and the River Tavy which flows from Dartmoor, through the town of Tavistock where it joins the Tamar - as they desperately sought out Tamara.

It is possible that the carving of this male figurehead is an amalgamation of Tamara’s narrative and that of the giants who pursued her.

There are no surviving records that indicate who carved the original figurehead. Once it was removed from the ship, it was stored within the collection at Devonport, Plymouth and recorded in the Relics Book. This is most likely due to its direct connection to the river which separates Plymouth (Devon) from Cornwall. This could indicate a local carver, most likely Frederick Dickerson of the Dickerson family of carvers, who was still designing figureheads into the 1860s.

The figurehead remained in collection at Devonport Naval Heritage Centre before being transferred to the National Museum of the Royal Navy, Portsmouth (NMRN). In 2020, fourteen figureheads from NMRN's collection were loaned to The Box, Plymouth for its reopening following a transformation from Plymouth City Museum. The figurehead of HMS Tamar can be seen on display in the South Hall.

== Notes ==
Preceded by HMS Victor Emmanuel	Royal Navy receiving ship in Hong Kong; 1873–1941	Succeeded by replaced by HMS Tamar (shore station) at Wellington Barracks, Hong Kong
