= Princess Charlotte-class ship of the line =

1825 British first-rate ships of the line

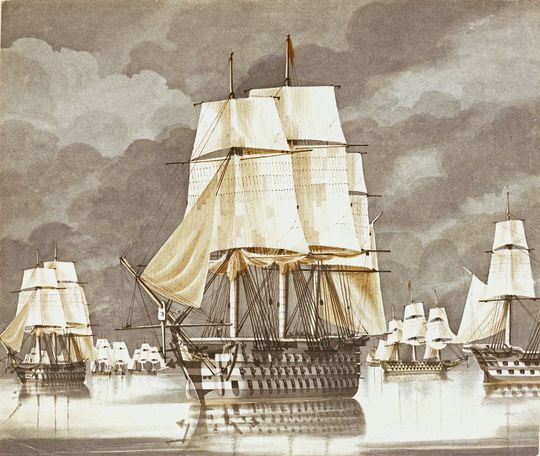
- A painting of Princess Charlotte off Mytilene, 1838

Class overview
- Name: Princess Charlotte
- Operators: Royal Navy
- In service: 1835–1905
- Completed: 2
- Scrapped: 2

General characteristics
- Type: Ship of the line
- Tons burthen: 4,217 44/94 (bm)
- Length: 197 ft 7 in (60.2 m) (at the gun deck); 163 ft 4 in (49.8 m) (at the keel)
- Beam: 52 ft 9 in (16.1 m)
- Draught: 17 ft 10 in (5.4 m)
- Depth of hold: 22 ft 6 in (6.9 m)
- Sail plan: Ship-rigged
- Crew: 738
- Armament: 110 muzzle-loading, smoothbore guns: Lower gun deck: 28 × 32 pdrs, 2 × 8 in (203 mm) shell guns; Middle gun deck: 30 × 32 pdrs, 2 × 8 in (203 mm) shell guns; Upper gun deck: 32 × 32 pdrs; Quarterdeck: 2 × 12 pdrs, 12 × 32 pdr carronades; Forecastle: 2 × 32 pdr carronades

The Princess Charlotte class consisted of two 110-gun, first rate ships of the line built for the Royal Navy (RN) during the 1820s. Upon completion they were placed in ordinary and remained in that status until the mid-1830s. Princess Charlotte was commissioned in 1837 to serve as the flagship of the commander of the Mediterranean Fleet and became the only ship of the pair to see combat when she participated in the Bombardment of Acre in 1840. The ship was placed back in ordinary the following year and remained in that status until she was converted into a receiving ship for duty in Hong Kong in 1857. Princess Charlotte was sold for scrap in 1875.

Royal Adelaide served as the flagship of the Commander-in-Chief, Plymouth, for several years beginning in 1835 and then again from 1862 until 1890. She then became a receiving ship from 1891 until she was sold for scrap in 1905.

== Design and description ==
The Princess Charlotte class were initially designed as copies of Sir Thomas Slade's Victory and were classified as 98-gun second rates. They were modified by the co-Surveyor of the Navy, Robert Seppings, to incorporate his round bow design. They were enlarged during construction to accommodate more guns and to incorporate Seppings' innovative system of interlocking diagonal bracing that improved the hull's strength. These changes caused them to be reclassified as 110-gun first rates. Their crew numbered 738 officers and ratings. The ships were fitted with three masts and ship-rigged.

The ships' specifications were a length of 197 feet 7 inches (60.2 m) at the gundeck and 163 feet 4 inches (49.8 m) at the keel. They had a beam of 52 feet 9 inches (16.1 m), a depth of hold of 22 feet 6 inches (6.9 m), a deep draught of 17 feet 10 inches (5.44 m) and had a tonnage of 241744/94 tons burthen. As completed the ships were to be armed with 110 muzzle-loading, smoothbore guns that consisted of twenty-eight 32-pounder (56 cwt) guns (Note: "Cwt" is the abbreviation for hundredweight, 56 cwt referring to the weight of the gun.) and two 8 in (203 mm) (65 cwt) shell guns on their lower gun deck, thirty 32-pounder (48 cwt) guns and a pair of 8-inch shell guns on their middle gun deck and thirty-two 32-pounder (32 cwt) guns on their upper gun deck. Their quarterdeck mounted a pair of 12-pounder guns and a dozen 32-pounder carronades. On their forecastle, they carried a pair of 32-pounder carronades.

== Ships ==
Both ships were placed in ordinary upon completion and were roofed over fore and aft.

Construction data
Ship	Builder	Ordered	Laid down	Launched	Commissioned	Fate
Princess Charlotte	HM Dockyard, Portsmouth	6 January 1812	November 1818	11 November 1825	9 February 1837	Sold for scrap, late 1875
Royal Adelaide	HM Dockyard, Plymouth	6 January 1812	May 1819	28 July 1828	5 September 1835	Sold for scrap, 4 April 1905

== Service history ==
Princess Charlotte was converted into a demonstration ship and had her roofing removed in July-August 1834. She was refitted for service as a flagship at Portsmouth from November 1836 to May 1837. Admiral Sir Robert Stopford, Commander-in-Chief of the Mediterranean Fleet, hoisted his flag aboard the ship later that year. She served during the Oriental Crisis of 1840 and participated in the Bombardment of Acre on 3 November 1840. Princess Charlotte returned home and was paid off on 27 July 1841. While in ordinary her armament was reduced to a dozen guns. The ship was converted into an "advanced ship" intended to be quickly mobilized for active service from October 1848 to November 1849, although she remained in ordinary status. Princess Charlotte was converted into a accommodation ship from April to July 1857 and became the receiving ship at Hong Kong on 7 February 1858. She remained there until she was paid off in July 1875 and was subsequently sold for scrap.

Royal Adelaide was initially named London, but was renamed in 1827. The ship was fitted for duty as a flagship with her roofing removed in July 1835 and was commissioned two months later as the flagship of the Commander-in-Chief, Plymouth, Admiral William Hargood and his successor, Admiral Lord Amelius Beauclerk. She was refitted as a demonstration ship in September 1840 and served as the flagship of Rear-Admiral Sir Thomas Pasley from December 1857. Royal Adelaide became the guard ship on 1 April 1859 at Plymouth while still remaining in ordinary. She then became a depot ship in July 1860. The ship resumed her previous role as flagship of the C-in-C, Plymouth, on 1 January 1862 and retained that role until 1890. Royal Adelaide was converted at HM Dockyard, Chatham, to serve as a receiving ship from September 1891 and remained there until she was sold for scrap on 4 April 1905.
