= HMS Royal Adelaide =

Ship of the line of the Royal Navy

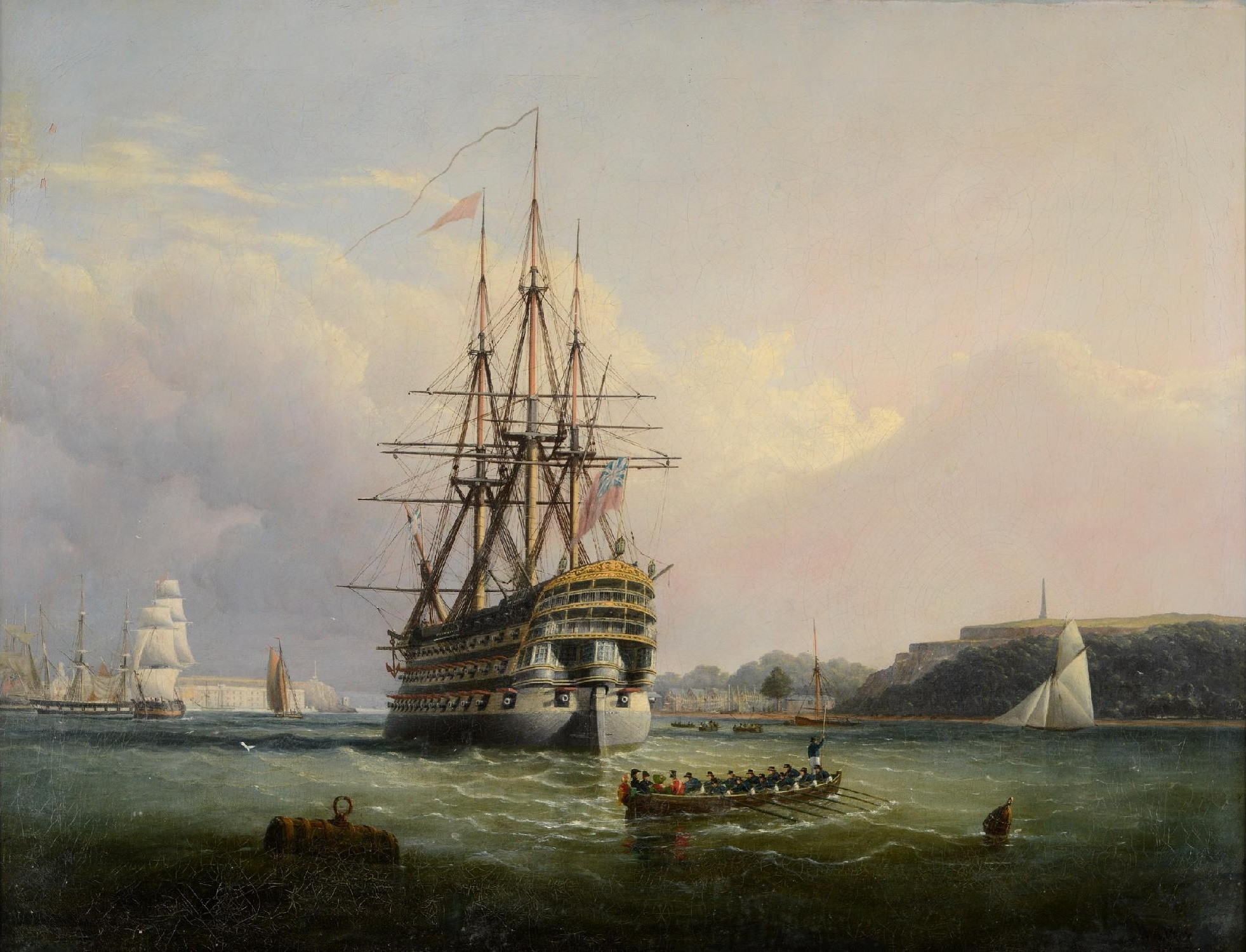

History

United Kingdom
- Name: HMS Royal Adelaide
- Ordered: 6 January 1812
- Builder: Plymouth Dockyard
- Laid down: May 1819
- Launched: 28 July 1828
- Fate: Sold, 1905

General characteristics
- Class & type: Princess Charlotte-class ship of the line
- Tons burthen: 2446 bm
- Length: 197 ft 7 in (60.22 m) (gundeck)
- Beam: 52 ft 10 in (16.10 m)
- Depth of hold: 22 ft 6 in (6.86 m)
- Propulsion: Sails
- Sail plan: Full-rigged ship
- Armament: 104 guns: Gundeck: 28 × 32 pdrs, 2 × 68 pdr carronades; Middle gundeck: 32 × 32 pdrs; Upper gundeck: 32 × 24 pdrs; Quarterdeck: 2 × 18 pdrs, 12 × 32 pdr carronades; Forecastle: 2 × 18 pdrs, 2 × 32 pdr carronades

HMS Royal Adelaide was a 104-gun first-rate ship of the line of the Royal Navy, launched on 28 July 1828 at Plymouth.

When first ordered in 1812 she was intended to be a second rate of 98 guns, but in the general reclassifications of 1817 she was reclassed as a first rate.

She was converted to serve as a depot ship in 1860, and was eventually sold out of the navy in 1905.
