= Henry George Thomsett =

Lt. Henry George Thomsett CMG (24 June 1825 – 24 January 1892) was a British Royal Navy officer and Harbour Master of Hong Kong.

== Early life ==
Thomsett was born in 1825 in Dover, Kent and joined the Royal Navy in 1840 as an officer in the navigation branch. By 1854, he was the commander of HMS Princess Charlotte stationed in Hong Kong. He retired from the Royal Navy in 1870.

== Hong Kong ==
He was the Harbour Master of Hong Kong from 1861 to 1888. During his service, he recommended Cape D'Aguilar, Green Island and Cape Collinson to be the sites for lighthouses, as lighthouses in these places would cover the eastern and western entrances to Hong Kong. Construction work started immediately on Cape D'Aguilar Lighthouse.

In 1873, he was appointed to the commission to enquiry and investigate the blockade of Hong Kong harbour by the Chinese Maritime Customs along with Phineas Ryrie, member of the Legislative Council and Malcolm Struan Tonnochy, Acting Registrar General by Governor Arthur Kennedy. He was also the emigration officer in about 1874 to 1875.

In 1887 he was made a member of the Hong Kong Legislative Council. For his services in Hong Kong he was appointed a Companion of the Order of St. Michael and St. George.

== Family life ==
Thomsett married Susannah Agnes Cunningham in 1855 in Portsea district of Portsmouth. Thomsett died on 24 January 1892 at Shirley near Southampton, England.

Government offices
Preceded by Andrew Lysaght Inglis	Harbour Master of Hong Kong; 1861–1888	Succeeded by Robert Murray Rumsey
