= HMS Princess Charlotte (1825) =

19th century royal navy ship

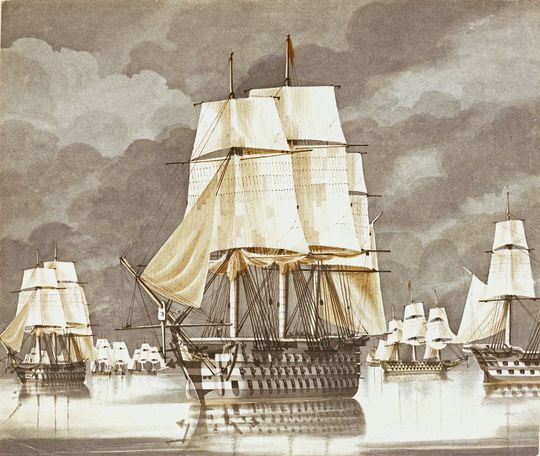
- Princess Charlotte off Mytelene on 21 September 1838

History

United Kingdom
- Name: Princess Charlotte
- Ordered: 19 June 1813
- Builder: Portsmouth Dockyard
- Laid down: November 1818
- Launched: 14 September 1825
- Fate: Sold, 1875

General characteristics
- Class & type: Princess Charlotte-class ship of the line
- Tons burthen: 2443 bm
- Length: 197 ft 7 in (60.22 m) (gundeck)
- Beam: 52 ft 10 in (16.10 m)
- Depth of hold: 22 ft 6 in (6.86 m)
- Propulsion: Sails
- Sail plan: Full-rigged ship
- Armament: 104 guns: Gundeck: 28 × 32 pdrs, 2 × 68 pdr carronades; Middle gundeck: 32 × 32 pdrs; Upper gundeck: 32 × 24 pdrs; Quarterdeck: 2 × 18 pdrs, 12 × 32 pdr carronades; Forecastle: 2 × 18 pdrs, 2 × 32 pdr carronades

HMS Princess Charlotte was a 104-gun, first-rate ship of the line, the lead ship of her class, built for the Royal Navy by Nicholas Diddams (but completed after his death) launched on 14 September 1825 at Portsmouth. The occasion was notable for the fact that the gates of the dry dock into which she was to be placed burst because of the high tide and more than 40 people were drowned.

When first ordered in 1812 she was intended to be a second rate of 98 guns, but in the general reclassifications of 1817 she was reclassed as a first rate.

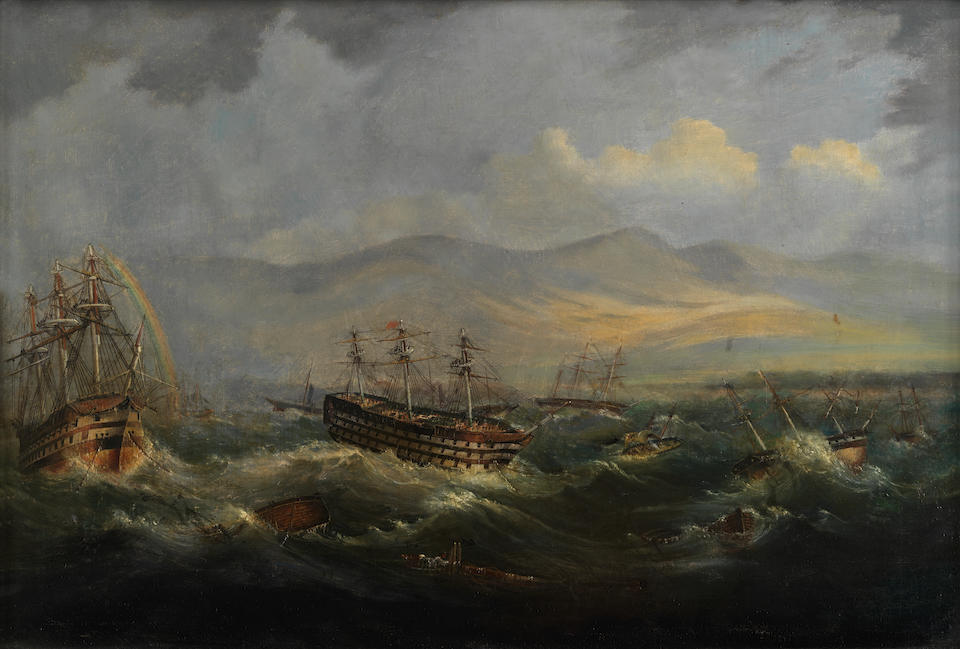
Princess Charlotte and part of the Allied Fleet in a heavy gale at St George Bay near Beyrout, 2 December 1840, by John Frederick Warre RN

From 1837 to 1841 she served as the flagship of the Mediterranean Fleet flying the flag of Vice Admiral Sir Robert Stopford and thus took part in the Syrian War and the bombardment of Acre. She had a crew of 738 men.

Her commanders included Captain Robert Devereux Fanshaw from 1837 to 1841 (as flagship to Admiral Sir Robert Stopford) and Sir Henry George Thomsett from 1858 to 1861.

She became a receiving ship at Hong Kong in 1858, and was sold in 1875.

== Notes ==
Preceded by None	Royal Navy Receiving Ship in Hong Kong; 1858–1873	Succeeded by HMS Victor Emmanuel
