= Agamemnon-class ship of the line =

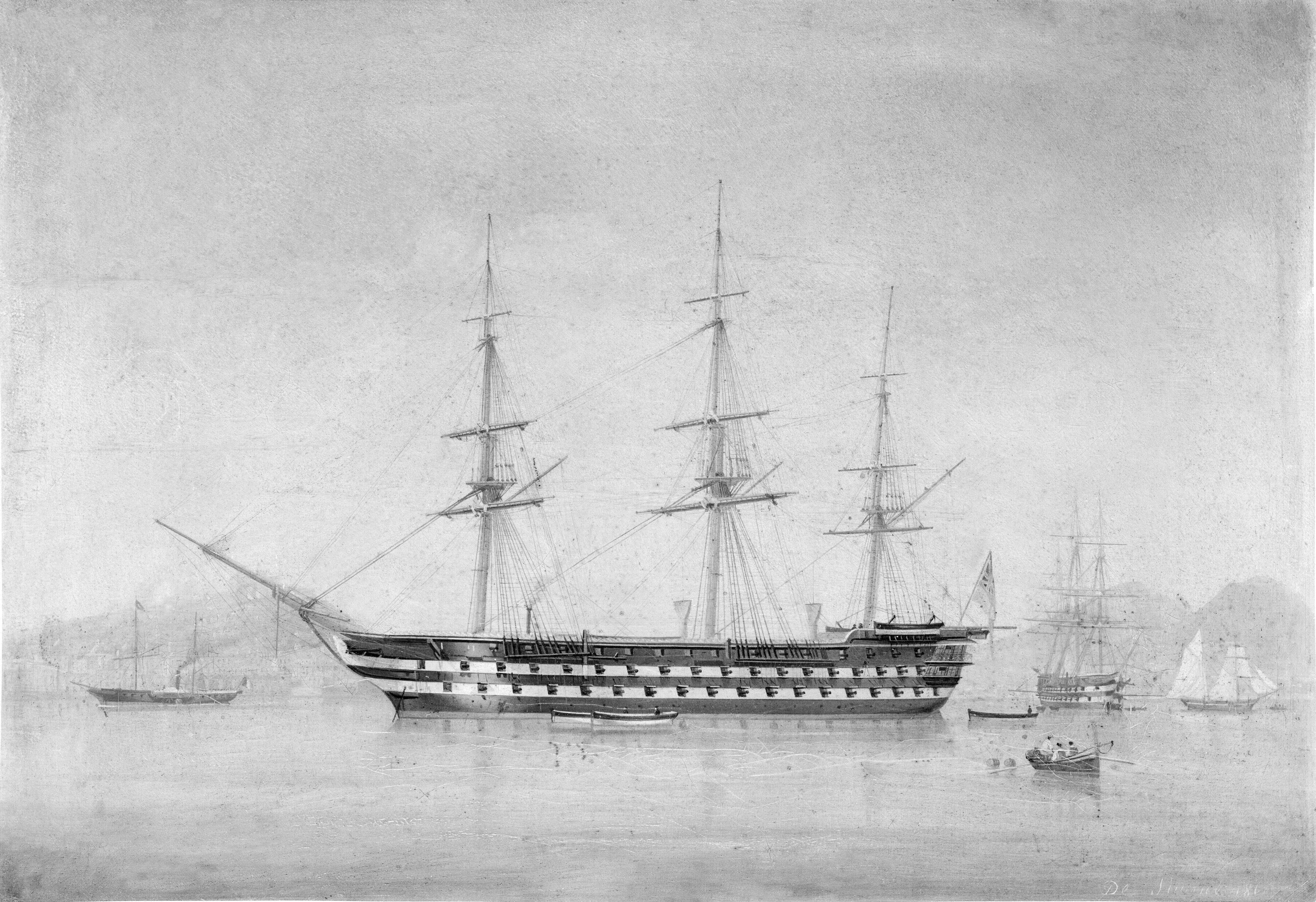
- HMS James Watt

Class overview
- Name: Agamemnon
- Operators: Royal Navy
- Preceded by: Princess Royal class
- Succeeded by: Renown class
- In service: August 1852 — 1904
- Completed: 5

General characteristics (as built)
- Type: 90-gun, second-rate, screw-powered, ship of the line
- Tons burthen: 3,074 41/94 bm
- Length: 230 ft (70.1 m) (gundeck)
- Beam: 55 ft 4 in (16.9 m)
- Depth of hold: 24 ft 6 in (7.5 m)
- Installed power: 2,268 ihp (1,691 kW)
- Propulsion: 1 screw; 1 single-expansion steam engine
- Sail plan: Full-rigged ship
- Speed: 9.4–11.4 knots (17.4–21.1 km/h; 10.8–13.1 mph) (trials)
- Complement: 860
- Armament: 91 muzzle-loading, smoothbore guns: Lower deck: 34 × 8 in (203 mm) shell guns; Upper deck: 34 × 32 pdrs; Quarterdeck & Forecastle: 22 × 32 pdrs; 1 × 68 pdr

The Agamemnon-class (sometimes known as the James Watt class) steam battleships, or steam ships of the line, were a class of five 91-gun steam second rates of the Royal Navy. The original design was produced by John Edye in 1847, as a response to the French Le Napoléon, which was rumoured to be under development.

The first ship of the class, Agamemnon, was originally designed as a two-decker, 80-gun sailing ship of the line, but was re-ordered as the first purpose-built steam screw ship for the British Navy.

== Ships ==
- HMS Agamemnon

Builder: Woolwich Dockyard
Ordered: 25 August 1849
Launched: August 1852
Fate: Sold, 12 May 1870

- HMS James Watt

Builder: Pembroke Dockyard
Ordered: 14 January 1850
Launched: 23 April 1853
Fate: Sold, 23 January 1875

- HMS Victor Emmanuel

Builder: Pembroke Dockyard
Ordered:
Launched: 27 September 1855
Fate: Sold, 1898

- HMS Edgar

Builder: Woolwich Dockyard
Ordered:
Launched: 23 October 1858
Fate: Sold, 1904

- HMS Hero

Builder: Chatham Dockyard
Ordered:
Launched: 15 April 1858
Fate: Sold, 20 June 1871
