= HMS Edgar (1858) =

Ship of the line of the Royal Navy

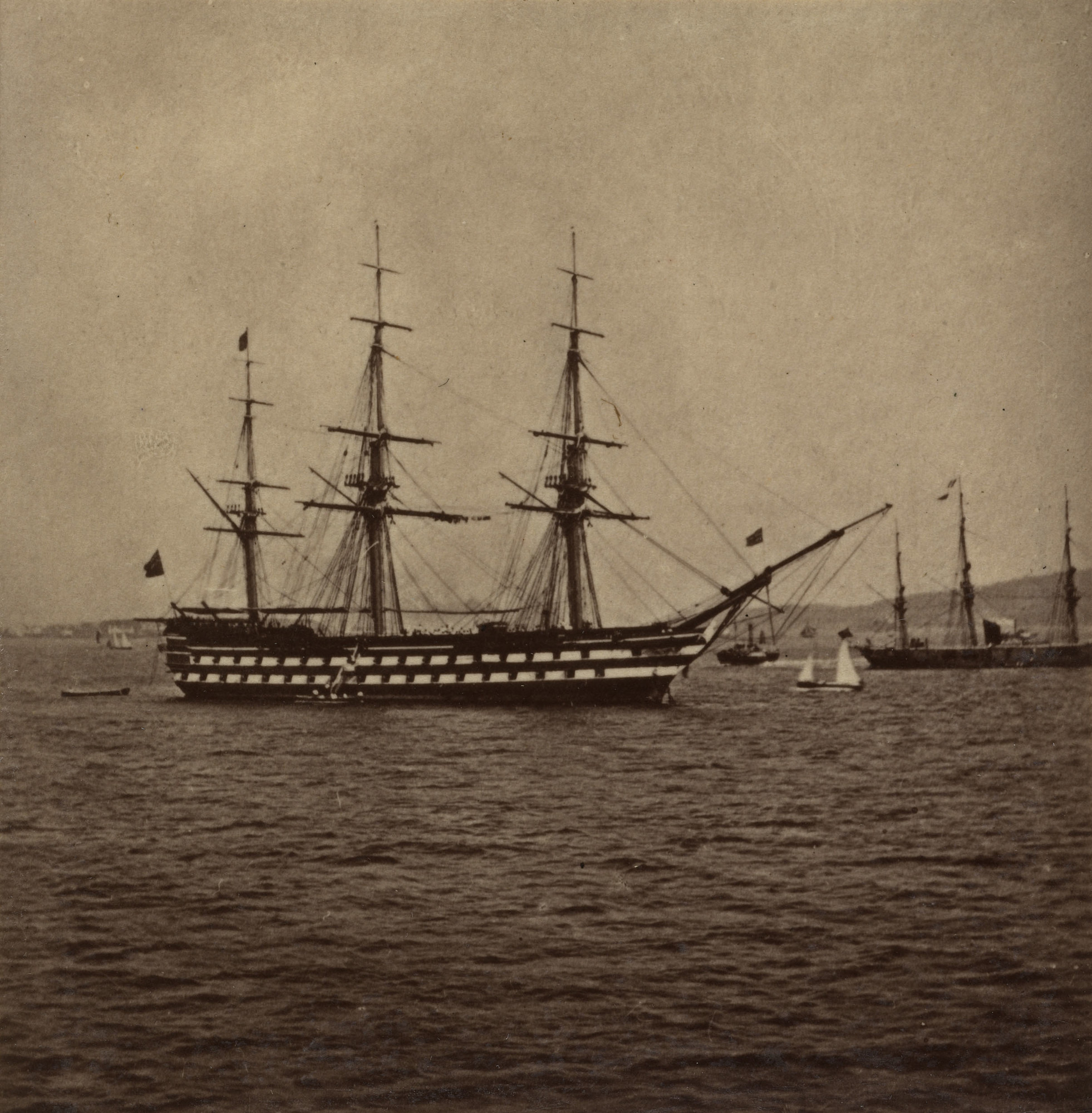
- Edgar anchored in the Firth of Forth with the Channel Squadron, mid-June 1860.

History

United Kingdom
- Name: Edgar
- Ordered: 4 April 1851
- Builder: Woolwich Dockyard
- Laid down: 4 July 1853
- Launched: 22 October 1858
- Completed: 19 July 1859
- Commissioned: 31 May 1859
- Out of service: 14 December 1865
- Reclassified: Quarantine ship, 12 December 1870
- Fate: Sold, 12 April 1904

General characteristics (as built)
- Class & type: 91-gun, second-rate Agamemnon-class ship of the line
- Tons burthen: 3,084 90/94 bm
- Length: 230 ft 3 in (70.2 m) (overall)
- Beam: 55 ft 4 in (16.9 m)
- Draught: 19 ft 6 in (5.9 m)
- Depth of hold: 24 ft 6 in (7.5 m)
- Installed power: 2,475 ihp (1,846 kW)
- Propulsion: 1 screw; 1 single-expansion steam engine
- Sail plan: Full-rigged ship
- Speed: 11.4 knots (21.1 km/h; 13.1 mph) (trials)
- Complement: 860
- Armament: 91 muzzle-loading, smoothbore guns: Lower deck: 34 × 8 in (203 mm) shell guns; Upper deck: 34 × 32 pdrs; Quarter deck & Forecastle: 22 × 32 pdrs; 1 × 68 pdr

HMS Edgar was a 91-gun, second-rate, steam-powered Agamemnon-class ship of the line built for the Royal Navy during the 1850s. Completed in 1859, she spent her entire active career as a flagship, serving in the Channel Squadron, the North America and West Indies Station before she was transferred to the Mediterranean Fleet in 1862. Edgar returned to the Channel Squadron the following year before being paid off near the end of 1865. The ship was hulked in 1870 to serve HM Customs as a quarantine ship and spent the next 20 years on that duty. Edgar was sold for scrap in 1904.

== Description ==
The Agamemnon-class ships of the line were built in response to the perceived threat from France by the construction of the steam-powered Napoléon-class ships of the line. Edgar measured 230 feet 3 inches (70.2 m) on the gundeck and 195 feet 3 inches (59.5 m) on the keel. She had a beam of 55 feet 4 inches (16.9 m), a depth of hold of 24 feet 6 inches (7.5 m), a deep draught of 19 feet 6 inches (5.94 m) and had a tonnage of 3,084 90/94 tons burthen. The ship was fitted with a two-cylinder, single-expansion steam engine built by Maudslay, Sons and Field that was rated at 600 nominal horsepower and drove a single propeller shaft. During her sea trials on 27 June 1859, Edgar's boilers provided enough steam for the engine to produce 2,475 indicated horsepower (1,846 kW) that was good for a speed of 11.4 knots (21.1 km/h; 13.1 mph). Her crew numbered 860 officers and ratings.

The ships had three masts and were ship-rigged. To reduce drag and improve performance under sail, the Agamemnons could hoist their propeller into the hull and retract the telescoping funnel. The ships were regarded as very manoeuverable for steamships, able to match sailing ships in their ability to tack and wear with precision. Captain Geoffrey Hornby regarded the sailing qualities of his Edgar as "superb" in a letter to his wife on 9 June 1863.

The ships' muzzle-loading, smoothbore armament consisted of thirty-four 8 in (203 mm) shell guns on their lower gundeck and thirty-four 32-pounder (56 cwt) guns (Note: "Cwt" is the abbreviation for hundredweight, 56 cwt referring to the weight of the gun.) on their upper gundeck. Between their forecastle and quarterdeck, they carried twenty-two 32-pounder (45 cwt) guns. The single 68-pounder gun was positioned on the forecastle as a pivot gun so that it could serve as a bow chaser.

== Construction and career ==
The Agamemnons were originally designed as 80-gun sailing two-deckers, but the design was revised in 1850 to incorporate more guns and steam power. Edgar was ordered on 4 April 1851 as a 80-gun second rate, but was re-rated as a 91-gun ship on 15 November 1852. She was laid down at Woolwich Dockyard, on 4 July 1853 and launched on 22 October 1858. Edgar was the fifth ship of her name to serve in the Royal Navy. She was commissioned on 31 May 1859 by Captain James Katon and completed on 19 July.

Edgar was assigned to the Channel Squadron as the flagship of Rear-Admiral John Erskine who was the second-in-command of the squadron. Captain George Mends relieved Katon on 22 May 1861; Erskine was transferred to the North America and West Indies Station in December and took Edgar with him. The ship was paid off on 10 July 1862 and recommissioned the following day by Captain Fitzgerald Foley as the flagship of Rear-Admiral Sir Sydney Dacres, second-in-command of the Mediterranean Fleet. Captain Geoffrey Hornby relieved Foley on 14 May 1863, now the flagship of the Channel Squadron with Dacres in command. Captain Thomas Brandreth briefly commanded Edgar, still Dacres's flagship, from September 1865 until the ship was paid off on 14 December.

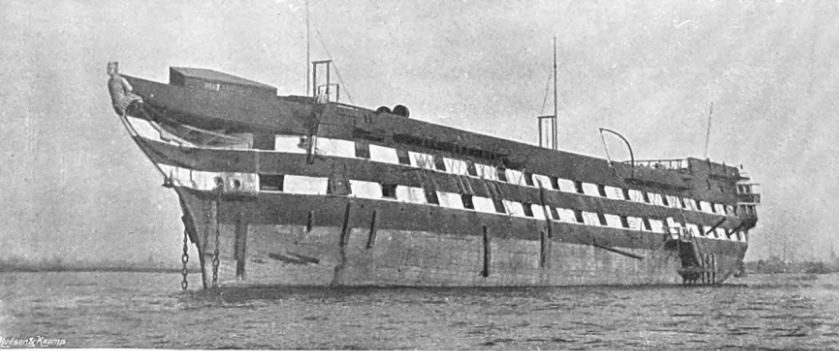
Edgar c.1899

In ordinary at HM Dockyard, Portsmouth, until 1870 when her engines were removed; the ship was loaned to HM Customs on 12 December to serve as a quarantine ship at Motherbank, Spithead. Edgar continued in that service until 1890, but was not disposed of until she was sold to Henry Castle & Sons on 12 April 1904 to be broken up in Charlton.
