= Geoffrey Hornby =

Royal Navy Admiral of the Fleet (1825–1895)

Admiral of the Fleet Sir Geoffrey Hornby GCB
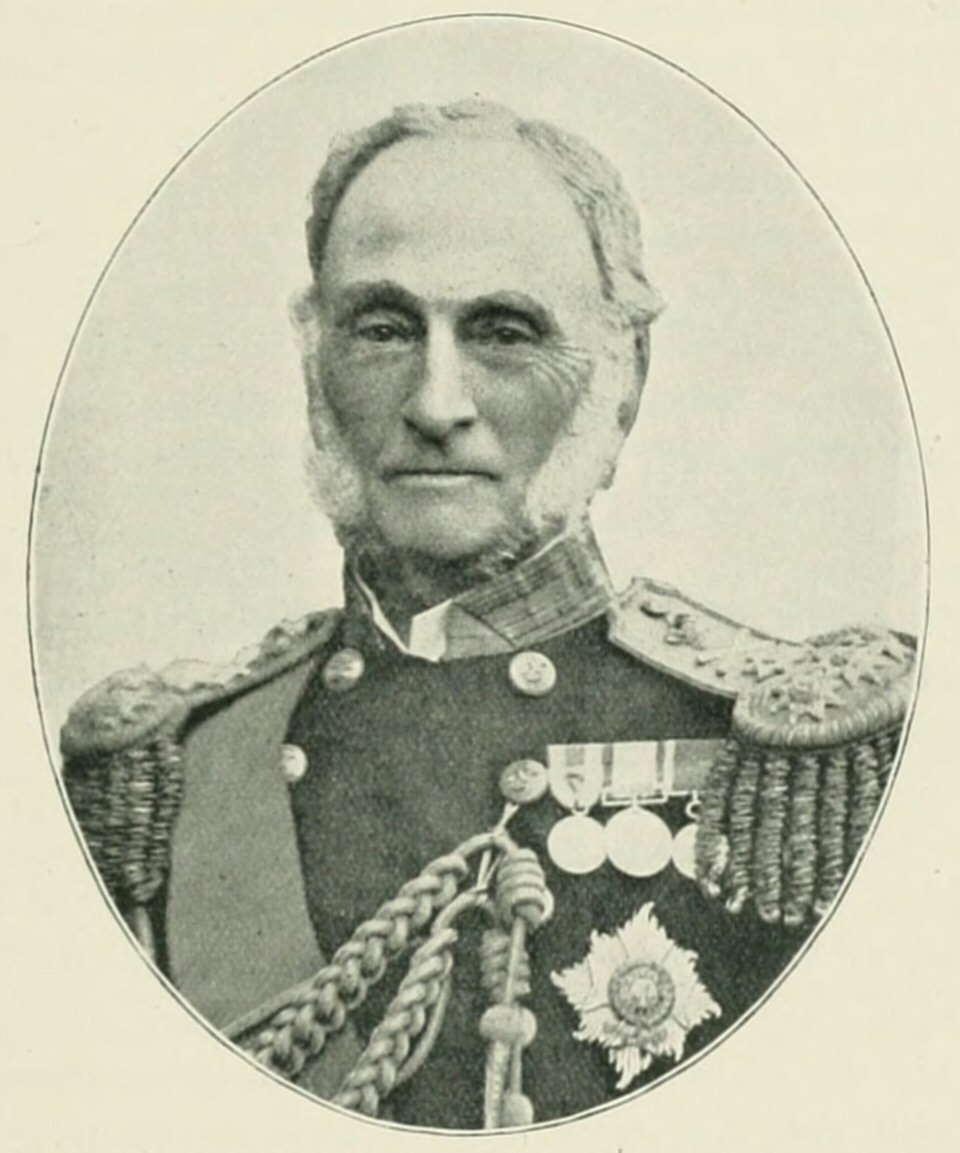
- Sir Geoffrey Hornby in 1895
- Born: 10 February 1825; Winwick, Lancashire, United Kingdom
- Died: 3 March 1895 (aged 70); Lordington House, Sussex, United Kingdom
- Spouse: Emily Frances Coles (m. 1853)
- Children: 5
- Relatives: Sir Phipps Hornby (father); James John Hornby (brother); Edmund Phipps-Hornby (son); Robert Hornby (son)
- Military career
- Allegiance: United Kingdom
- Branch: Royal Navy
- Service years: 1837–1895
- Rank: Admiral of the Fleet
- Commands: Portsmouth Command; Mediterranean Fleet; Channel Squadron; Flying Squadron; West Africa Squadron; HMS Edgar; HMS Neptune; HMS Tribune
- Conflicts: Egyptian–Ottoman War; Battle of Acre; Pig War
- Awards: Knight Grand Cross of the Order of the Bath

Admiral of the Fleet Sir Geoffrey Thomas Phipps Hornby GCB (10 February 1825 – 3 March 1895) was a Royal Navy officer. As a junior officer, he saw action at the capture of Acre in November 1840 during the Egyptian–Ottoman War. As a captain, he was assigned to Vancouver Island with a naval brigade where he found a unit of United States troops ready to take over the San Juan Islands in a dispute that became known as the Pig War. Hornby used his powers of diplomacy to facilitate a peaceful handover of the islands to the United States.

Hornby went on to be Commander-in-Chief, West Africa Squadron, Commander-in-Chief of the Flying Squadron and then Commander-in-Chief, Channel Squadron. After that he became Commander-in-Chief, Mediterranean Fleet, President of the Royal Naval College, Greenwich and finally Commander-in-Chief, Portsmouth.

== Early career ==
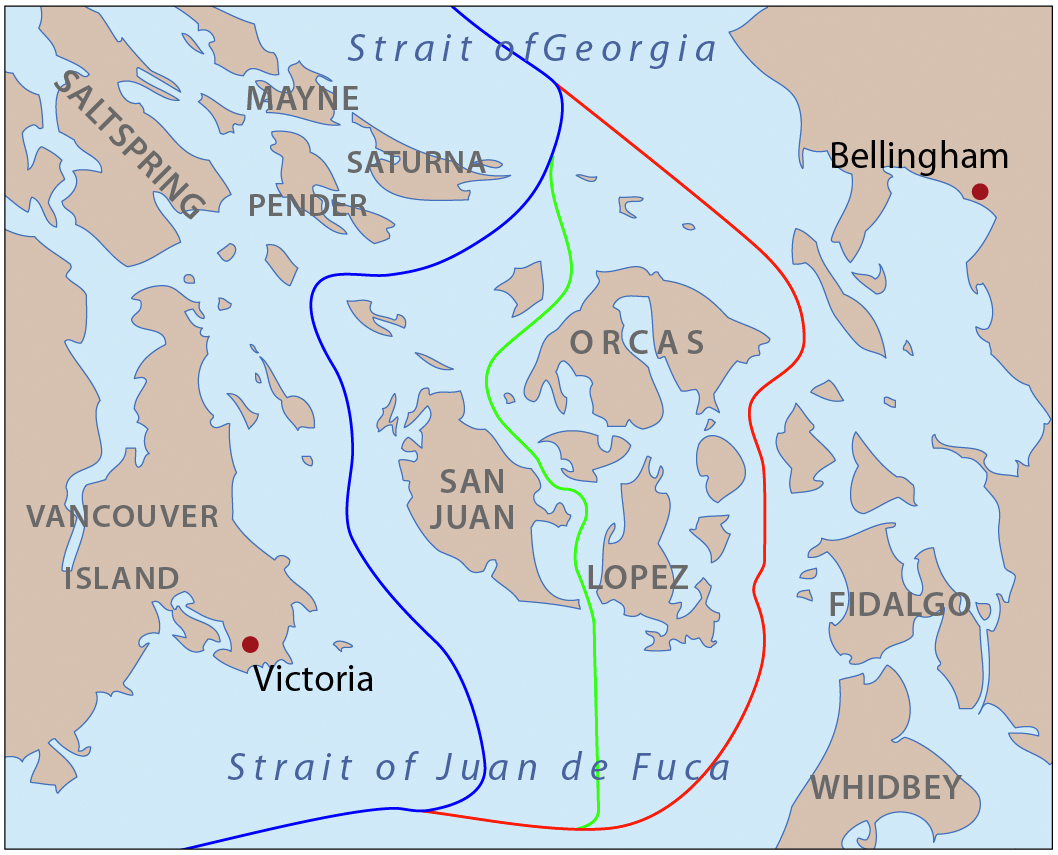
Map of the proposed boundaries between the United States and Canada around the San Juan Islands during the Pig War

Born the son of Admiral Sir Phipps Hornby and Sophia Maria Hornby (daughter of General John Burgoyne), Hornby was educated at Winwick Grammar School and Southwood's School in Plymouth and joined the Royal Navy in March 1837. He was appointed, as a first class volunteer, to the first-rate HMS Princess Charlotte, flagship of the Commander-in-Chief, Mediterranean Fleet and saw action at the capture of Acre in November 1840 during the Egyptian–Ottoman War. He transferred to the fourth-rate HMS Winchester, flagship of the Commander-in-Chief, Cape of Good Hope Station, in August 1842. He went on to be mate in the sixth-rate HMS Cleopatra, in the West Africa Squadron, and took part on anti-slavery operations. Promoted to lieutenant on 15 June 1845, he became flag-lieutenant in the second-rate HMS Asia, flagship of his father, who was Commander-in-Chief, Pacific Station, in September 1847. He was promoted to commander on 12 January 1850 and to captain on 18 December 1852.

Hornby had no patron once the Aberdeen ministry came to power in December 1852 and instead cared for his father's estate at Lordington and played no part in the Crimean War. Following a change of government, Hornby became commanding officer of the frigate HMS Tribune on the Pacific Station in August 1858. When he arrived at Vancouver Island with a naval brigade, he found that a unit of American troops was about to take over the San Juan Islands in a dispute known as the Pig War. Hornby used his powers of diplomacy to facilitate a peaceful handover of the islands to the United States.

Hornby became commanding officer of the first-rate HMS Neptune in the Mediterranean Fleet in February 1861 and then became flag captain to the Commander-in-chief, Channel Squadron in the second rate HMS Edgar in May 1863. In January 1864 the squadron was instructed to shadow the ships of the Austro-Hungarian Navy en route to Prussia and to sink their ships if they bombarded Copenhagen as their answer to the Schleswig-Holstein Question.

Promoted to commodore, he became Commander-in-Chief, West Africa Squadron, with his broad pennant in the frigate HMS Bristol in September 1865. He condemned the independent rulers of West Africa for continuing to supply slaves when all civilised countries except Brazil had abolished slavery.

== Senior command ==
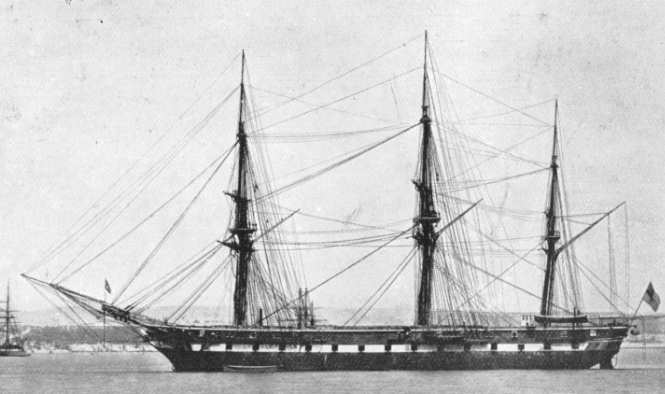
The frigate HMS Liverpool, Hornby's flagship as Commander-in-Chief of the Flying Squadron

Promoted to rear admiral on 1 January 1869, Hornby became Commander-in-Chief of the Flying Squadron, with his flag in the frigate HMS Liverpool, in June 1869 and undertook a circumnavigation of the World to demonstrate that Royal Navy could reach any part of the globe. He went on to be Commander-in-Chief, Channel Squadron, with his flag in the armoured frigate HMS Minotaur, in September 1871 and in that capacity entertained President Ulysses S. Grant at Gibraltar.

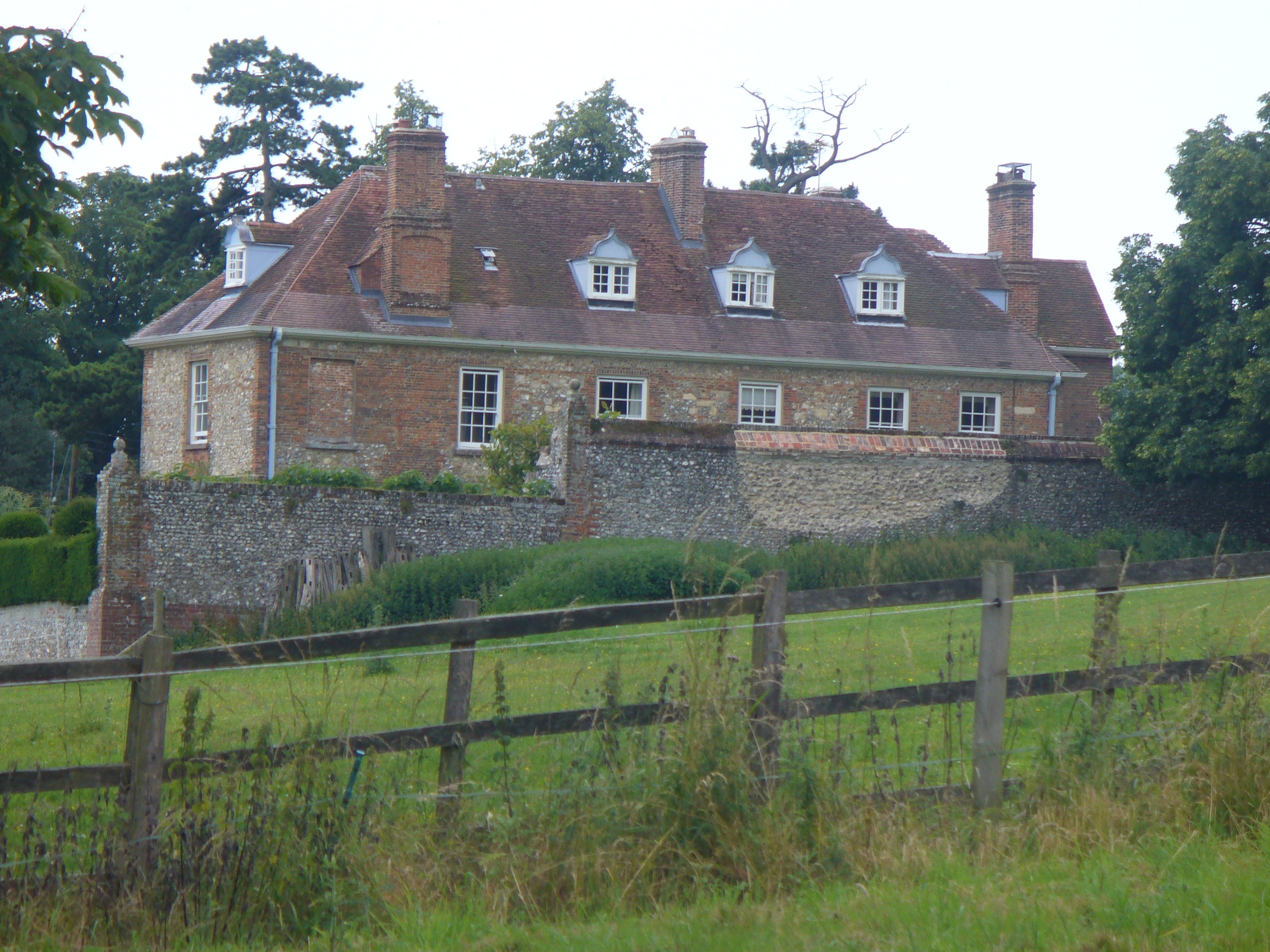
Lordington House, Hornby's home in West Sussex

Hornby became Second Naval Lord under the Second Disraeli ministry in December 1874 and was promoted to vice admiral on 1 January 1875. He went on to be Commander-in-Chief, Mediterranean Fleet, with his flag in the battleship HMS Alexandra, in January 1877. He forced his way through the Dardanelles, despite Turkish protests, in a display of British naval power intended to deter Russian aggression during the Russo-Turkish War. Sir John Fisher, who served under Hornby in the Mediterranean Fleet, wrote that he was 'the finest Admiral afloat since Nelson. [...] There never lived a more noble character or a greater seaman. He was incomparable'. The naval historian Sir William Clowes, who knew him well, wrote that '... he was a natural diplomatist, and an unrivalled tactician; and, to a singular independence and uprightness of character, he added a mastery of technical detail, and a familiarity with contemporary thought and progress that were unusual in those days among officers of his standing'. The historian Ben Wilson has said that Hornby was "the exceptional admiral who eased the Navy's transition from sail to steam". Hornby was appointed a Knight Commander of the Order of the Bath on 12 August 1878.

Promoted to full admiral on 15 June 1879, Hornby became President of the Royal Naval College, Greenwich in March 1881 and went on to be Commander-in-Chief, Portsmouth in November 1882. He was advanced to Knight Grand Cross of the Order of the Bath on 19 December 1885, appointed First and Principal Naval Aide-de-Camp to the Queen on 18 January 1886 and promoted to Admiral of the Fleet on 1 May 1888. He was appointed to the staff of the German emperor Wilhelm II during his visits to England in 1889 and 1890. He retired in February 1895 and died of influenza at Lordington House on 3 March 1895; his ashes were scattered at Compton Church.

== Family ==
In 1853 Hornby married Emily Frances Coles (sister of Captain Cowper Coles), with whom he had three sons and two daughters. One of his sons, Edmund Phipps-Hornby, a major in the artillery, won the Victoria Cross in South Africa in 1900; another, Robert Hornby, became an admiral in the Royal Navy.

== Sources ==
- Heathcote, Tony (2002). The British Admirals of the Fleet 1734 – 1995. Pen & Sword Ltd. ISBN 0-85052-835-6.
- Lambert, Andrew (2008). Admirals. London: Faber & Faber. ISBN 978-0571231577.
- Wilson, Ben (2013). Empire of the Deep: The Rise and Fall of the British Navy. W&N. ISBN 978-0297864080.

Military offices
| Preceded by Sir George Wellesley | Commander-in-Chief, Channel Fleet; 1871–1874 | Succeeded by Sir Beauchamp Seymour |
| Preceded by Sir John Tarleton | Second Naval Lord; 1874–1877 | Succeeded by Sir Arthur Hood |
| Preceded by Sir James Drummond | Commander-in-Chief, Mediterranean Fleet; 1877–1880 | Succeeded by Sir Beauchamp Seymour |
| Preceded by Sir Charles Shadwell | President, Royal Naval College, Greenwich; 1881–1882 | Succeeded by Sir William Luard |
| Preceded by Sir Alfred Ryder | Commander-in-Chief, Portsmouth; 1882–1886 | Succeeded by Sir George Willes |
Honorary titles
| Preceded by Sir Astley Key | First and Principal Naval Aide-de-Camp; 1886–1895 | Succeeded by Sir Algernon Lyons |
