= Tack (sailing) =

Windward side of a sailing craft

A tack is the windward side of a sailing craft (side from which the wind is coming while under way)—the starboard or port tack. Generally, a craft is on a starboard tack if the wind is coming over the starboard (right) side with sails on port (left) side. Similarly, a craft is on a port tack if the wind is coming over the port (left).

Tack is also a nautical term both for the lower, windward corner of a sail.

== Windward side of course sailed ==
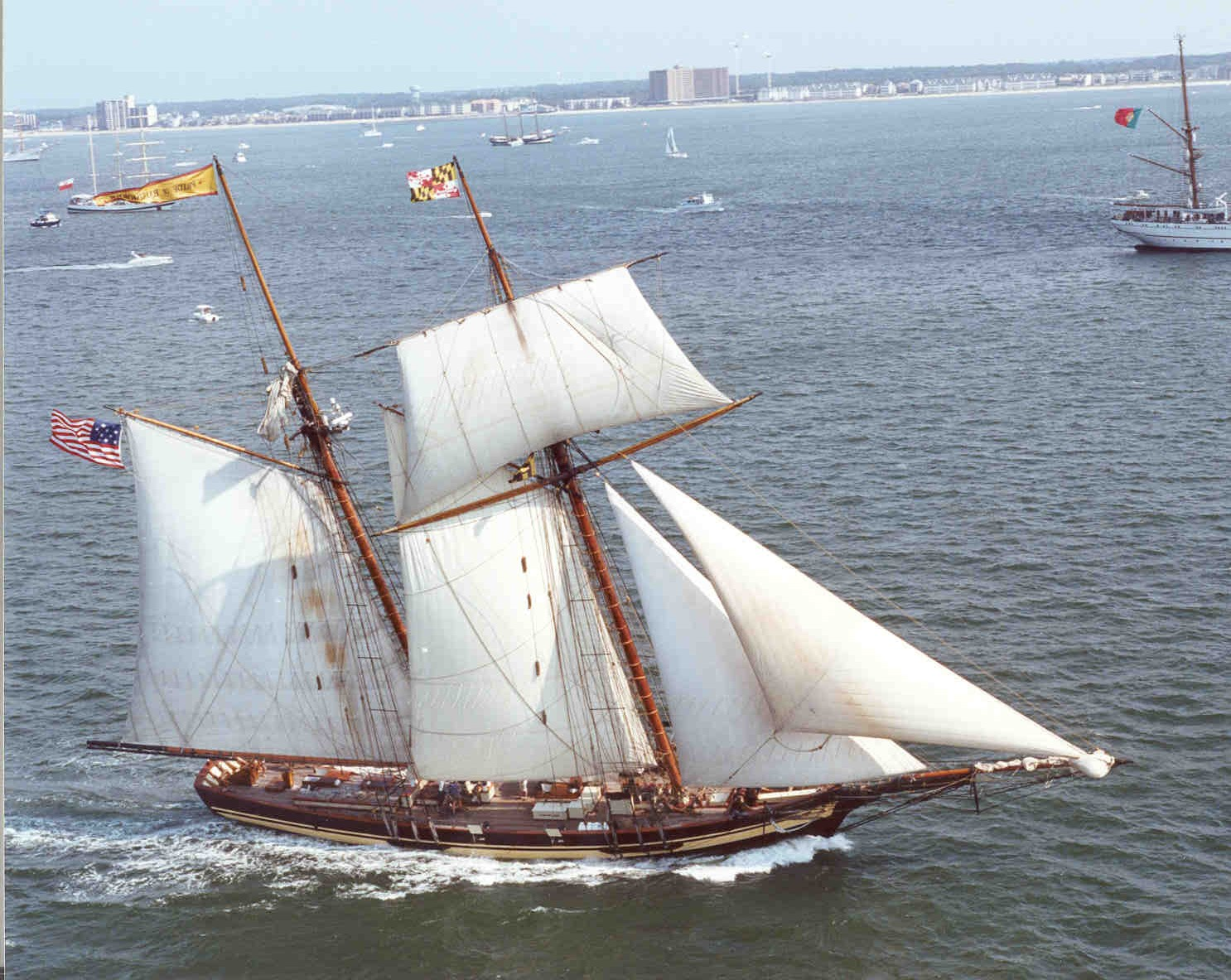
This vessel is on port tack with the wind coming from the port side.

As a point of reference, tack is the alignment of the wind with respect to a sailing craft under way. If the wind is from the starboard side of the sailing craft, it is on starboard tack, and if from port, on port tack. The International Regulations for Preventing Collisions at Sea for vessels underway declare that when the courses of two sailing vessels converge, the vessel on port tack must give way to a vessel on starboard tack. The maneuver of changing a sailing craft's course from one tack to the other during which the wind direction is brought across the bow is called tacking; with the wind direction brought across the stern, it is called jibing for fore-and-aft rigged sailing craft, or wearing ship for square-rigged vessels.

When a boat is running with the wind coming directly from astern and the mainsail and jib are on opposite sides of the vessel, the windward side is considered to be that opposite to the side on which the mainsail is being carried. On a starboard tack the mainsail is on the port side; on a port tack the mainsail is on the starboard side.

== Sail corner ==
The tack is the corner on a fore-and-aft sail where the luff (the forward edge) and foot (the bottom edge) connect and, on a mainsail, is located near where the boom and mast connect. On a square sail or a spinnaker, the tack is the windward clew (lower corner) and also the line holding down that corner; when the vessel changes course to have the other vertical edge of the sail to the wind, the other clew becomes the tack.

== Bibliography ==
- West, Gillian, "Basic Cruising Skills", Sail Canada, 2019 (ISBN 978-1-894495-92-9)
- Rousmaniere, John, The Annapolis Book of Seamanship, Simon & Schuster, 1999
- Chapman Book of Piloting (various contributors), Hearst Corporation, 1999
- Herreshoff, Halsey (consulting editor), The Sailor’s Handbook, Little Brown and Company
- Seidman, David, The Complete Sailor, International Marine, 1995
- Jobson, Gary, Sailing Fundamentals, Simon & Schuster, 1987
