= HMS Cyclops (1839) =

British paddle wheel naval steam frigate 1839-1864

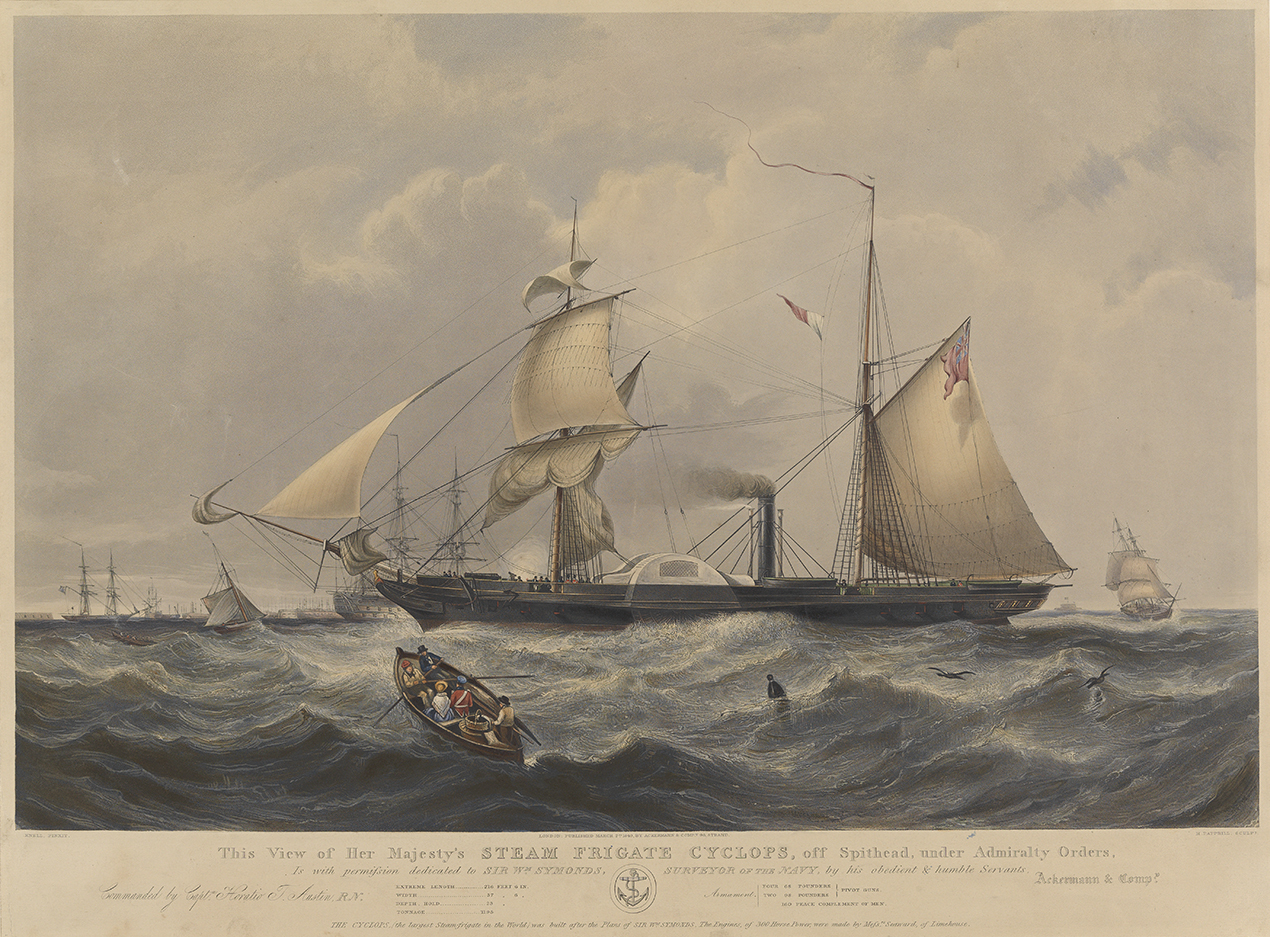
HMS Cyclops off Spithead in 1840 – etching from a painting by William Adolphus Knell

HMS Cyclops was a paddle wheel steam frigate built for the Royal Navy and launched in 1839 and taken out of service in 1861 and sold for breaking in January 1864. She saw action in the Syrian War in 1840 and the Crimean War in 1854, later being involved in laying the first Transatlantic telegraph cable in 1858.

The Cyclops was a first class sloop launched on 10 July 1839 and completed in February 1840. Built in the Royal Navy dockyard in Pembroke Dock, Pembrokeshire in Wales with a wooden hull, she weighed 1,195 tons, had six guns and was propelled by a paddle in the middle of the ship powered by J. & S. Seaward and Capel two-cylinder 'Gorgon' engines giving a top speed of 9.5 knots. The Cyclops was originally intended as a sister ship for the Gorgon but in July 1838 her design was altered by adding a 12 foot long midships section and she became a steam frigate, changing to a corvette in the 1850s. At that time she was the largest steam warship in the world.

== Design ==
By 1840 the Royal Navy had commissioned two ships that had been designed as steam paddle frigates. The Gorgon and the slightly larger Cyclops had both been constructed to have a full battery on their gun deck, next to carrying guns on their upper decks. However, Gorgon was so deep in the water that her gun ports had to be shut permanently. Cyclops had been designed to carry 16 32 pdrs on the main deck, but these could not be fitted. Both ships therefore failed to become true frigates, but were nevertheless very successful. The Cyclops would be taken as a model to build six more of these steam frigates (Vulture, Firebrand, Gladiator, Sampson, Dragon and Centaur) . On 31 May 1844 the Admiralty then officially adopted the term 'steam frigate'. All these ships became steam (paddle) frigates of the second class, except for the Gorgon, which became a sloop.

The rating of Cyclops as a 'steam frigate' was surprising: she was rigged as a brig (with only two masts), and carried all her guns on the upper deck. Other aspects did explain this classification. The Cyclops was commanded by a captain and had at least been planned to have a 'complete' covered gun deck. The crew of 175 men was a reduced crew. By counting 13 men for every two 32 pdrs, the designed complement would be 175 + (8*13) = 284 men, almost matching that of a fifth rate frigate. Another reason to rate the Cyclops as a frigate was that with her size of 1,190 bm tons, she was of the same size as the fifth rate frigates like those of the Seringapatam-class frigate of 1,150 bm tons. As the Royal Navy lacked a corvette category, the alternative would have been to rate her as a sloop, but even ship-rigged sloops did not get near her size. When the Royal Navy started to use the designation corvette, the Cyclops and her six near sisters were re-classified as corvettes in the 1850s.

== Early crew ==
From 19 November 1839 the Cyclops was commanded by Captain Horatio Thomas Austin, and among the crew at its launch was Joseph Andrews who in 1845 was appointed captain of the hold aboard the Erebus and who was lost during the Franklin Expedition. In March 1840 Arthur Cumming (later Admiral Sir Arthur Cumming) was appointed Mate, while in February 1841 Charles Frederick Schomberg was appointed the ship's senior lieutenant.

== Syrian War ==
Under Austin the Cyclops saw service in the Mediterranean Sea and operations during the Syrian War in 1840, one of the last actions for which the Naval General Service Medal was awarded. The war had begun when Mehemet Ali, Pasha of Egypt, attempted to claim independence from the Ottoman Empire. Ali invaded Syria and took control of the Ottoman Fleet forcing young Sultan Abdülmecid I to request help from the European powers. Great Britain, Austria, Prussia and Russia agreed to assist and issued an ultimatum to Ali demanding his withdrawal from Ottoman possessions (Arabia, Crete and Syria) in return for being made hereditary Viceroy of Egypt. Cyclops was detached from patrolling to carry the ultimatum into Alexandria on 9 August 1840.

The ultimatum was refused and the European allies intervened, the naval side of the war becoming the responsibility of Britain and Austria. Cyclops played an active role; arriving at Beirut on 7 September 1840 to fire shells in support of the landing of Ottoman troops, attempting to capture the fort at Gebail on 11 September, landing marines and further troops at Jouna on 12 September and capturing Batroun on 15 September. On 25 September Cyclops arrived at Sidon, the main Egyptian southern division supplies depot, alongside HMS Thunderer, Gorgon, Wasp, Stromboli, Hydra, SMS Guerriera (Austrian) and Gulfideh (Ottoman). The ships proceeded to bombard the citadel and surrounding fort on 26 September before a force of 500 Ottoman troops were landed. The 2,700 strong defending force continued to resist so the bombardment was resumed and reinforcements of 750 British Marines and 100 Austrian troops landed, alongside some British sailors. The fort was overrun and the entire garrison captured, Cumming being mentioned in despatches for his bravery during the action. The Admiralty rewarded him with promotion to the rank of lieutenant, dated just two days after the action. Cyclops remained in the theatre until leaving for Malta in October and saw action at Tsour, the Syrian War continued into November 1840. The Cyclops was paid off in January 1843.

== Later service ==
From May to September 1843 under Captain Austin the Cyclops saw service off Ireland and formed part of the "royal squadron" accompanying the royal yacht Victoria and Albert to Le Tréport in France and Ostend in Belgium. In 1846 she formed part of the Experimental Squadrons, groups of ships sent out in the 1830s and 1840s to test new techniques of ship design, armament, building and propulsion against old ones.

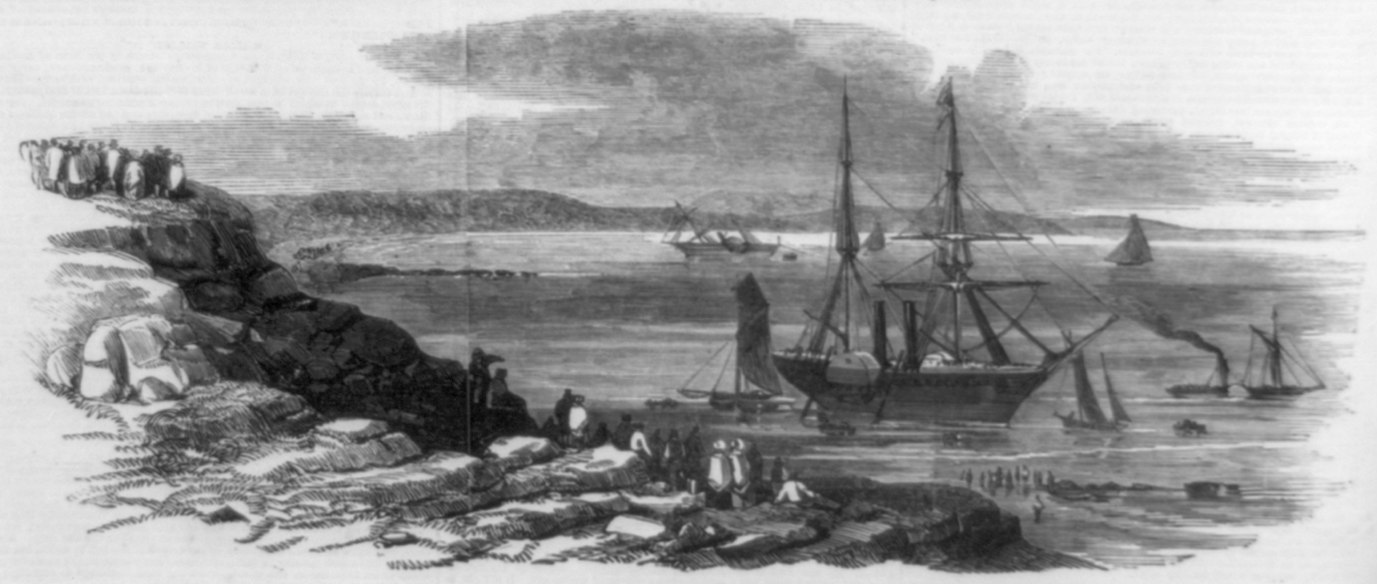
The steam-ships Pottinger and Cyclops stranded in Thorness Bay, Cowes, on the Isle of Wight on 1 November 1846

From November to December 1846 she was commanded by Captain William Frederick Lapidge off the south-east coast of America following which she formed part of the Channel Squadron. In December 1843 Lieutenant Graham Gore joined the crew being "employed for particular service". He was later lost on Erebus during the Franklin Expedition in the Arctic.

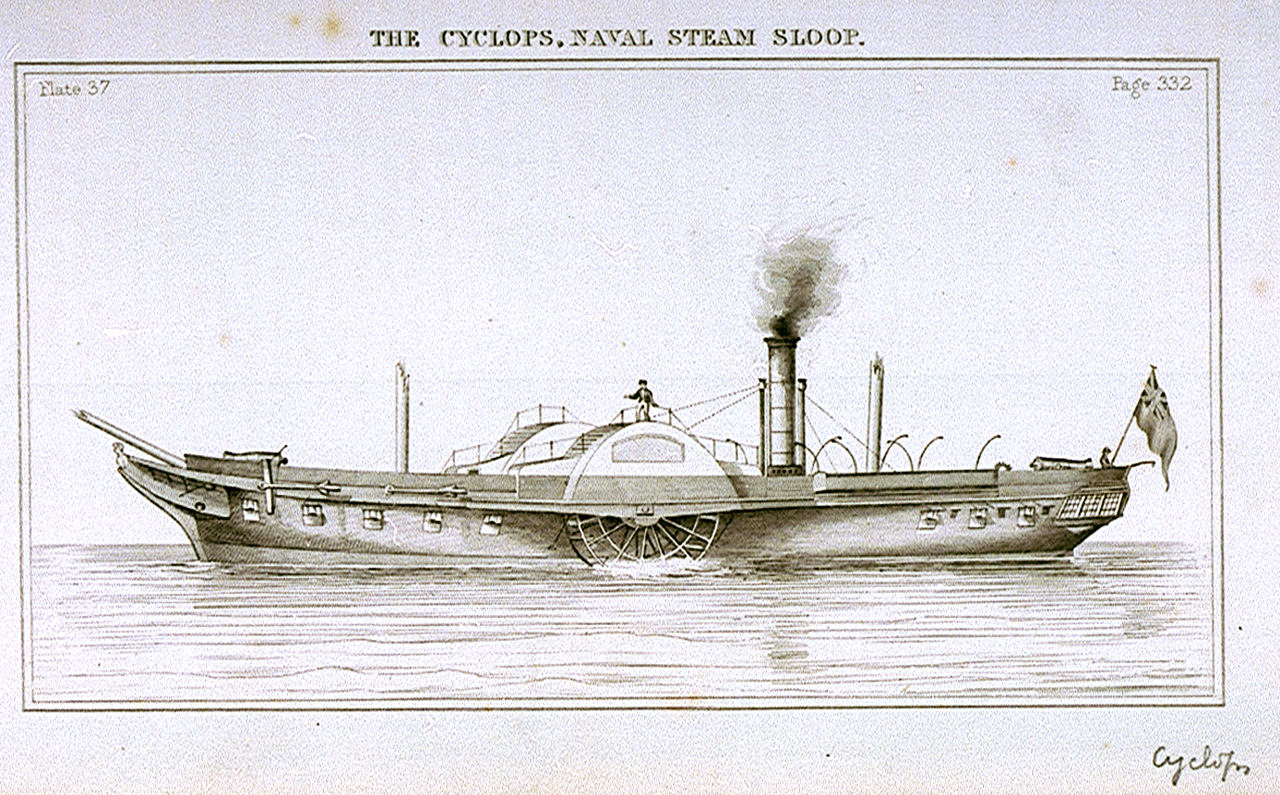
Etching of HMS 'Cyclops in 1851

From July 1848 her captain was George Fowler Hastings, during whose command she transported soldiers to Ireland and saw service on the west coast of Africa until February 1851. The crew of Cyclops are recorded as receiving bounties for the capture of the vessels Bom Successo on 25 December 1848, Esperanca on 10 May 1849, Sophia on 11 August 1849 and Apollo on 29 October 1949 (the last two in consort with HMS Rattler) Pilot on 10 January 1850, Ventura on 27 January 1850 (both with HMS Pluto), Sociedade on 17 June 1850, and an unnamed "slave brigantine" on 20 November 1850; as the chief duty of the West Africa Squadron was the suppression of the slave trade, presumably those ships were all slave ships.

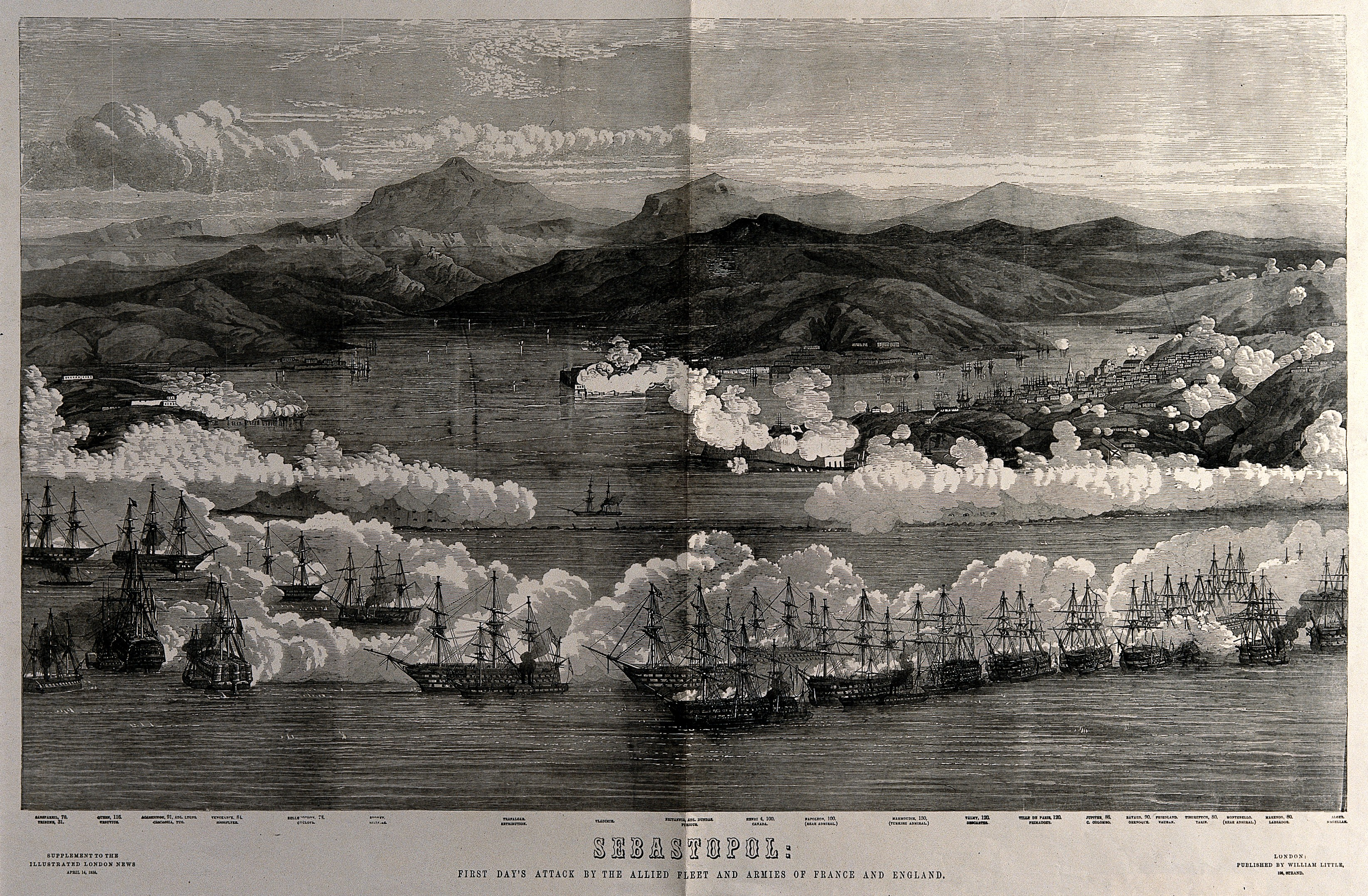
Cyclops at Sebastopol, during the first day's attack by the allied fleet and armies of France and England on 17 October 1854

The Cyclops saw action under its Master Robert Wilson Roberts on 17 October 1854 when she took part in the first Bombardment of Sebastopol during the Crimean War.

In 1855 she saw service in the Mediterranean under Master Commander John F. Rees, while during April to September 1857 under Lieutenant Commander Joseph Dayman she took surveyed the route for laying the first Transatlantic telegraph cable and in the following year she escorted the converted warship HMS Agamemnon when the first cable was laid. From September 1857 under Captain William John Samuel Pullen she was in the East Indies and China and was involved in surveying the Red Sea and Ceylon.

== Jeddah Massacre (1858) ==
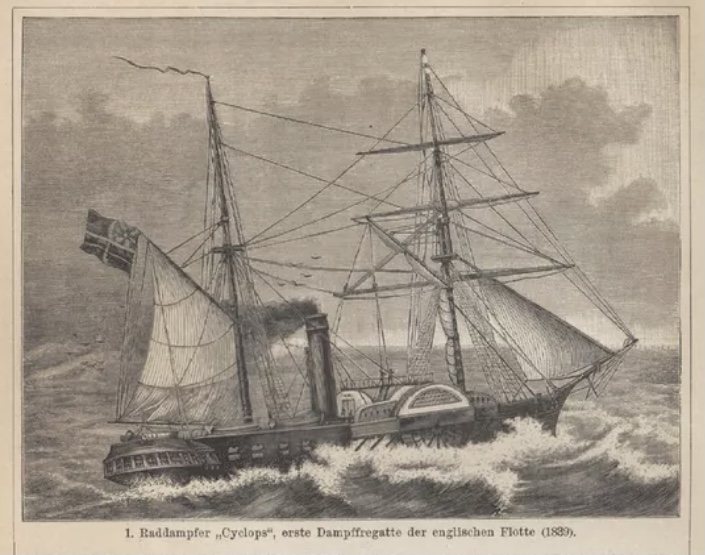
The Cyclops at sea

On 15 June 1858 21 Christian residents of Jeddah, then an Ottoman town of 5,000 inhabitants, predominantly Muslims, were killed in the Jeddah massacre, including the French consul M. Eveillard and his wife, and the British vice-consul Stephen Page, by "some hundreds of Hadramites, inhabitants of Southern Arabia". On getting no reply to her "demand for satisfaction", the Cyclops bombarded the town for two days in July 1858. Twenty-four residents, mostly Greeks and Levantines, some "under British protection" plus the daughter of the French consul Elise Eveillard and the French interpreter M. Emerat, both badly wounded, escaped and took refuge, some by swimming to it, in the Cyclops.

Her final service was to lay a submarine cable between Karachi and Aden to complete the telegraph link between London and India. She was finally paid off in May 1861.

HMS Cyclops was sold for breaking in January 1864.

== Sources ==
- Winfield, Rif (2014), British Warships in the Age of Sail 1817-1863, Seaforth Publishing, p. British Warships in the Age of Sail 1817-1863: Design, Construction, Careers and Fates, ISBN 9781473849624
