= Arthur Cumming (Royal Navy officer) =

Royal Navy Admiral (1817–1893)

Admiral Sir Arthur Cumming KCB
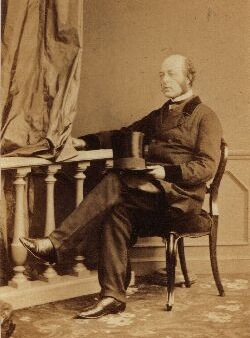
- Arthur Cumming in later life
- Born: 6 May 1817; Nancy, France
- Died: 17 February 1893 (aged 75) London, United Kingdom
- Allegiance: United Kingdom
- Branch: Royal Navy
- Service years: 1831–1882
- Rank: Admiral
- Commands: HMS Rattler (1849–1851), HMS Gorgon (1854), HMS Conflict (1854–1855), HMS Glatton (1855–6), HMS Emerald (1859–1863), Naval commander-in-chief of the East Indies (1872–1875),
- Conflicts: Syrian War, Crimean War
- Awards: Knight Commander of the Order of the Bath

Admiral Sir Arthur Cumming KCB (6 May 1817 – 17 February 1893) was an officer of the Royal Navy.

He was born in Nancy, France to Sir Henry John Cumming, a general in the British Army and received naval education at the Royal Naval College in Portsmouth. Cumming served as a midshipman in the Mediterranean and North America before being promoted to lieutenant in 1840 for his actions in the Syrian War. He remained with the Mediterranean Fleet until appointed to HMS Frolic, a sloop stationed in South America. Whilst detached from Frolic and in command of a small pinnace on 6 September 1843 Cumming and seven men boarded a Portuguese slave ship, subdued her 27-man crew and brought her back to Rio de Janeiro. He had expected to be promoted for his efforts, but was overlooked and resented the decision for the rest of his life. Cumming spent some time in the Navy's Experimental Squadron before being promoted commander on 9 November 1846.

Cumming's first command was HMS Rattler, stationed off West Africa, during which he captured another slave ship. He saw active service against the Russians during the Crimean War, captaining the frigate HMS Gorgon and being promoted to post-captain on 19 April 1854. Subsequently, Cumming was transferred to HMS Conflict and, in company with HMS Amphion, was able to capture the Baltic Sea port of Libau without firing a shot. Towards the end of the war he took command of the ironclad floating battery HMS Glatton but arrived in the Black Sea after the peace had been agreed. He returned to the UK in time for Glatton to take part in Queen Victoria's 1856 Fleet Review. Cumming was appointed captain of the frigate HMS Emerald on 14 May 1859 and remained with the ship until the end of her Royal Navy career on 7 November 1863. Emerald served in the Channel Fleet, the Baltic Sea and Admiralty propeller trials. She also made several trips to the Americas including "one of the quickest passages on record" to Bermuda in 1860. After her decommissioning Cumming was appointed a Companion of the Order of the Bath, served aboard HMS Victory and Duke of Wellington and in the Packet Service.

Cumming achieved flag rank on 27 February 1870 when he was promoted to rear-admiral. He served for a while as a port admiral before becoming the Naval Commander-in-Chief of the East Indies in 1872, remaining there until 1875. Cumming continued to receive promotions, becoming vice-admiral in 1876 and admiral in 1880, but retired from the Navy in 1880. In retirement he lived at Foston Hall, near Derby. Cumming was appointed Knight Commander of the Order of the Bath as part of Queen Victoria's Golden Jubilee celebrations on 21 June 1887 and died in London on 17 February 1893.

== Early life ==
Arthur Cumming was born at Nancy in France on 6 May 1817, his father was General Sir Henry Cumming. Arthur was entered into the Royal Naval College at Portsmouth in January 1831, passing the course and being discharged on 8 August 1832. His first ship was the sloop HMS Rover on which he served in the Mediterranean (presumably as a midshipman), also serving on the Lisbon and North American Stations.

In 1837, Cumming passed his examinations to become eligible for the position of lieutenant and was promoted to the rank of mate on 4 April.

By early 1840, Cumming was stationed at HMS Excellent, a navy stone frigate in Portsmouth that housed the gunnery school.

== Syrian War ==
On 14 March 1840 Cumming was appointed mate on the frigate HMS Cyclops (commanded by Horatio Thomas Austin), part of Commodore Charles John Napier's squadron sent to intervene for Britain in the Syrian War, and reached the ship in April. The war had begun when Mehemet Ali, Pasha of Egypt, attempted to claim independence from the Ottoman Empire. Ali invaded Syria and took control of the Ottoman Fleet forcing young Sultan Abdülmecid I to request help from the European powers. Great Britain, Austria, Prussia and Russia agreed to assist and issued an ultimatum to Ali demanding his withdrawal from Ottoman possessions (Arabia, Crete and Syria) in return for being made hereditary Viceroy of Egypt. Cyclops was detached from patrolling to carry the ultimatum into Alexandria on 9 August 1840.

The ultimatum was refused and the European allies intervened, the naval side of the war becoming the responsibility of Britain and Austria. Cyclops played an active role; arriving at Beirut on 7 September 1840 to fire shells in support of the landing of Ottoman troops, attempting to capture the fort at Gebail on 11 September, landing marines and further troops at Jouna on 12 September and capturing Batroun on 15 September. On 25 September Cyclops arrived at Sidon, the main Egyptian southern division supplies depot, alongside HMS Thunderer, Gorgon, Wasp, Stromboli, Hydra, SMS Guerriera (Austrian) and Gulfideh (Ottoman). The ships proceeded to bombard the citadel and surrounding fort on 26 September before a force of 500 Ottoman troops were landed. The 2,700 strong defending force continued to resist so the bombardment was resumed and reinforcements of 750 British Marines and 100 Austrian troops landed, alongside some British sailors. The fort was overrun and the entire garrison captured, Cumming being mentioned in despatches for his bravery during the action. The Admiralty rewarded him with promotion to the rank of lieutenant, dated just two days after the action. Cyclops remained in the theatre until leaving for Malta in October and saw action at Tsour, the Syrian War continued into November.

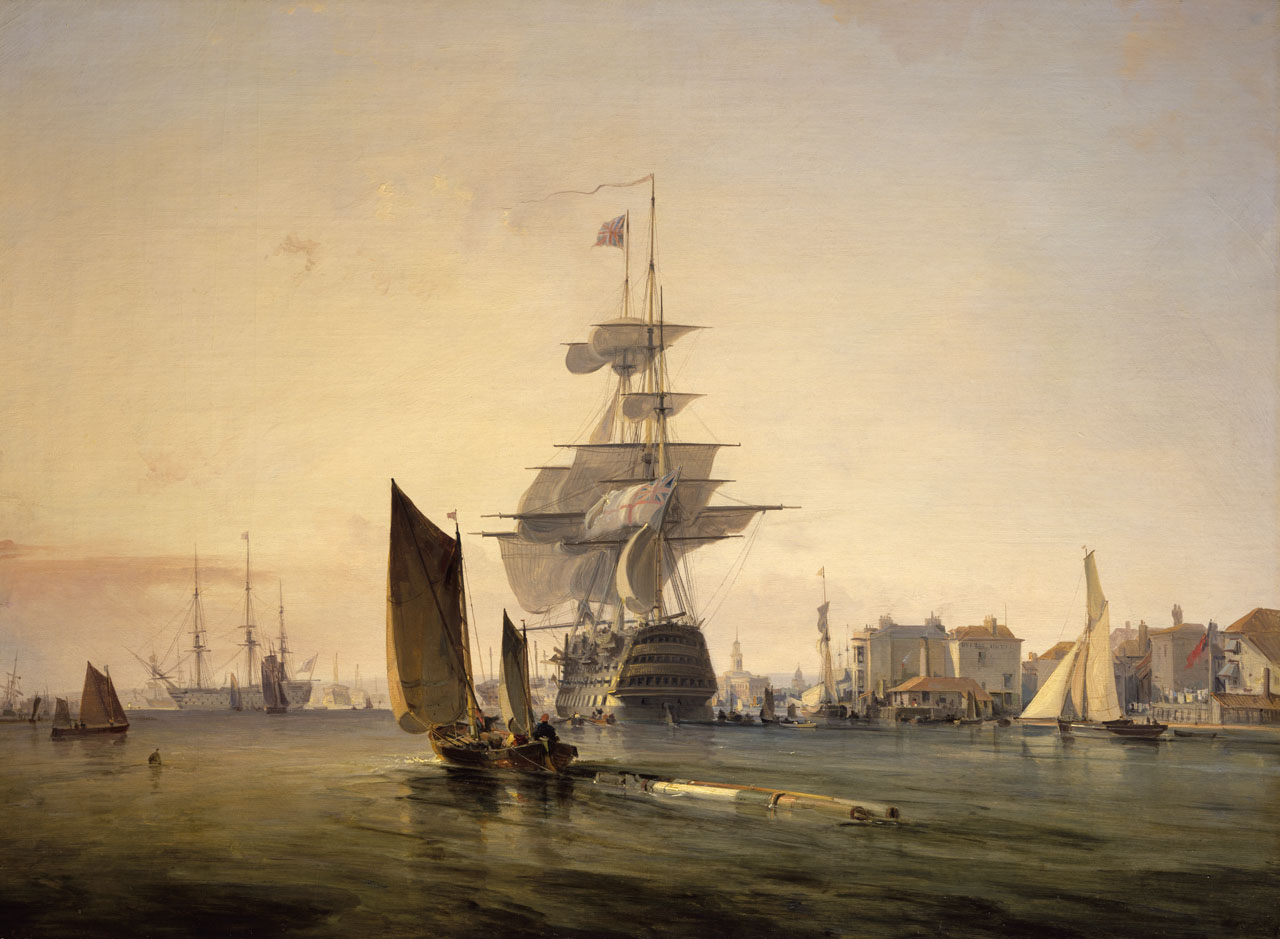
HMS Britannia painted in 1835

Cumming transferred to HMS Princess Charlotte, a first-rate ship of the line commanded by Arthur Fanshawe and flagship of Robert Stopford, Commander-in-Chief of the Mediterranean Fleet, on 28 November 1840. By January 1841 Cumming had transferred again, being appointed lieutenant in HMS Britannia. Britannia, commanded by Michael Seymour, was another first-rate and the new flagship of the Mediterranean Fleet, John Ommanney having succeeded Stopford as Commander-in-Chief. Cumming's next posting was again within the Mediterranean Fleet, serving under Houston Stewart from 19 June 1841 to 23 May 1842 on the 74-gun third-rate HMS Benbow.

== South America ==
On 5 November 1842 Cumming was appointed to the newly built 16-gun sloop HMS Frolic, under the command of William Alexander Willis. Frolic was posted to South America and on 6 September 1843 Cumming was cruising off Santos, São Paulo, in command of the ship's pinnace, when he encountered the large brigantine Portuguese slaver Vincedora in company with two other slaving vessels. The British slave trade had been outlawed by the Slave Trade Act 1807 and the Royal Navy viewed all slavers as pirates, liable to be arrested and their ships confiscated. Cumming positioned the pinnace to cut off the Vincedora's retreat but the brigantine made to ram the boat. At the last moment, perhaps wary of intentionally killing a Royal Navy officer and his men, the Vincedora changed course. Shortly afterwards Cumming was able to shoot the brigantine's captain.

With their captain killed the crew were thrown into confusion and Cumming was able to board the vessel, followed by a marine and six sailors – all that could fit on the deck at the time. Cumming and his men were able to drive the 27-strong and fully armed crew below and lock them beneath the hatches. He got the rest of the pinnace's crew aboard and ordered the Portuguese crew shackled to the anchor cable. The other two slavers could have changed the course of events if they chose to get involved but instead made their escape. The Vincedora displaced just 55 tons but was found to be carrying 338 slaves, having left Africa with 450.

The ships set sail for Rio de Janeiro, arriving there on 10 September when the slaves were transferred to the hulk Crescent under the supervision of Sir Thomas Paisley. Paisley said that he had "never witnessed anything so shocking", particularly as most of the slaves were suffering from emaciation and sores and others were infected by smallpox and had to be quarantined aboard the Vincedora. The slaves included parentless children, babies and a harem of women for the brigantine's crew. Although the slaves continued to die over the next month, most recovered to be set free. The event was recorded in the memoirs of Sir Astley Cooper Key.

Cumming hoped that he would be promoted to commander as a result of the action given the unusual circumstances and danger involved. However the event was reported to London merely as the commonplace capture of a slaver and hence merited no reward, a fact that Cumming resented for the rest of his life. Instead all he received was a period of quarantine, followed by an attack of smallpox and a long convalescence in England. Cumming remained nominally with Frolic until 21 October 1843.

== Experimental Squadron ==
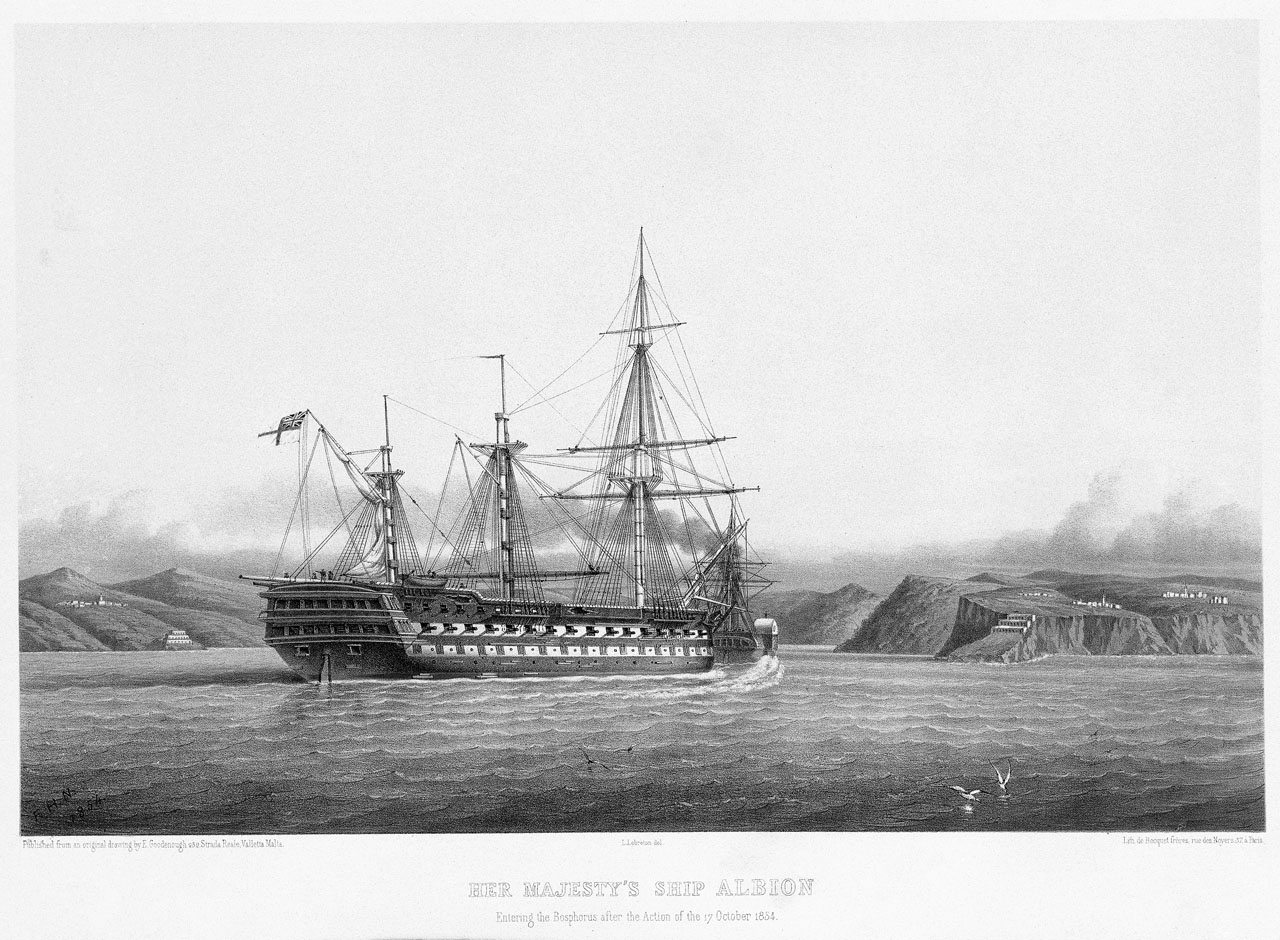
Engraving of the Albion, partially dismasted during the Crimean War

Cumming was posted to the brig HMS Espiegle on 2 October 1844, serving under Captain Thomas Pickering Thompson in the East Indies until 27 March 1845. The next day he was appointed to HMS Caledonia, a first-rate commanded by Alexander Milne that served as the flagship of his father Admiral Sir David Milne who was the Commander-in-Chief, Plymouth. On 29 April Cumming transferred to the first-rate HMS Queen, under the command of Baldwin Wake Walker and the flagship of John West in Devonport. Cumming was transferred again on 13 July 1845 to the second-rate HMS Albion, captained by Nicholas Lockyer and remained aboard until 30 November 1846.

Albion, alongside Cumming's previous ships Caledonia and Queen and other vessels, was part of the 1845 Experimental Squadron. Cumming sailed on the first trial of 1845 that lasted from 15 July to 20 September and was supervised by Rear Admiral Hyde Parker. The trial was part of a series that attempted to compare new methods of ship building with traditional ones. Cumming at last received promotion to Commander on 9 November 1846. His first command was HMS Rattler, a 12-gun sloop that had been the first warship powered by a steam engine and screw propeller, that he captained from 12 February 1849 to 15 April 1851 on the west coast of Africa. Whilst in command of Rattler Cumming captured the Brazilian slave brigantine Alepide on 30 October 1849. In 1853 Cumming married Adelaide Stuart with whom he had at least one child.

== Crimean War ==
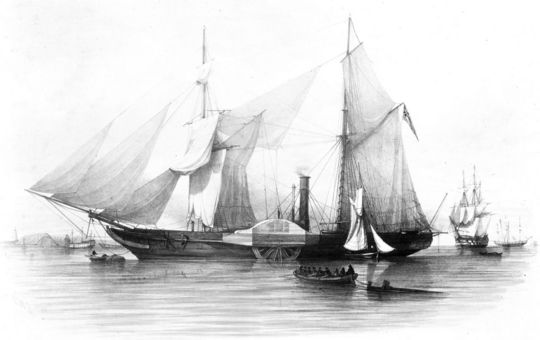
HMS Gorgon painted by Sir Oswald Walters Brierly in 1837

Cumming saw active service against the Russians during the Crimean War. On 25 February 1854 he received command of the frigate HMS Gorgon, being promoted to post-captain on 19 April. Cumming was transferred to command HMS Conflict on 9 May 1854 and served aboard her in the Baltic Sea until 6 February 1855. In company with HMS Amphion, under the command of Captain Astley Cooper Key, the Conflict sailed into Libau on 17 May 1854. The harbour contained eight Russian merchant vessels and was defended by a force of 4–500 soldiers with 2–3 cannon.

Cumming went ashore under a flag of truce to meet with the town's governor and demand the handing over of the merchant ships within three hours. The governor refused to comply but the Russian troops left the town shortly afterwards and the governor stated that, whilst he could not order them out of the harbour, Cumming and Key would be permitted to enter the harbour to take them. They proceeded to do so, finding themselves in control of the entire town of 10,000 inhabitants with just 110 men, and took out the eight merchant vessels without firing a shot. The ships were sent with prize crews to the Prussian port of Memel. Cumming and Conflict also saw service at the port of Riga in this period and from 15 April to 22 May were responsible for boarding 19 vessels.

Cumming returned to England in 1855 and on 22 May was appointed to HMS Glatton, an ironclad floating battery with orders to sail her to the Black Sea. He carried out these orders but arrived after the end of the war and returned Glatton to the United Kingdom by Spring 1856. He remained captain of the battery until 3 May 1856 and commanded her during the 23 April 1856 Fleet Review, where Glatton was one of four floating batteries that were the first ironclad ships to appear at any fleet review.

== HMS Emerald ==
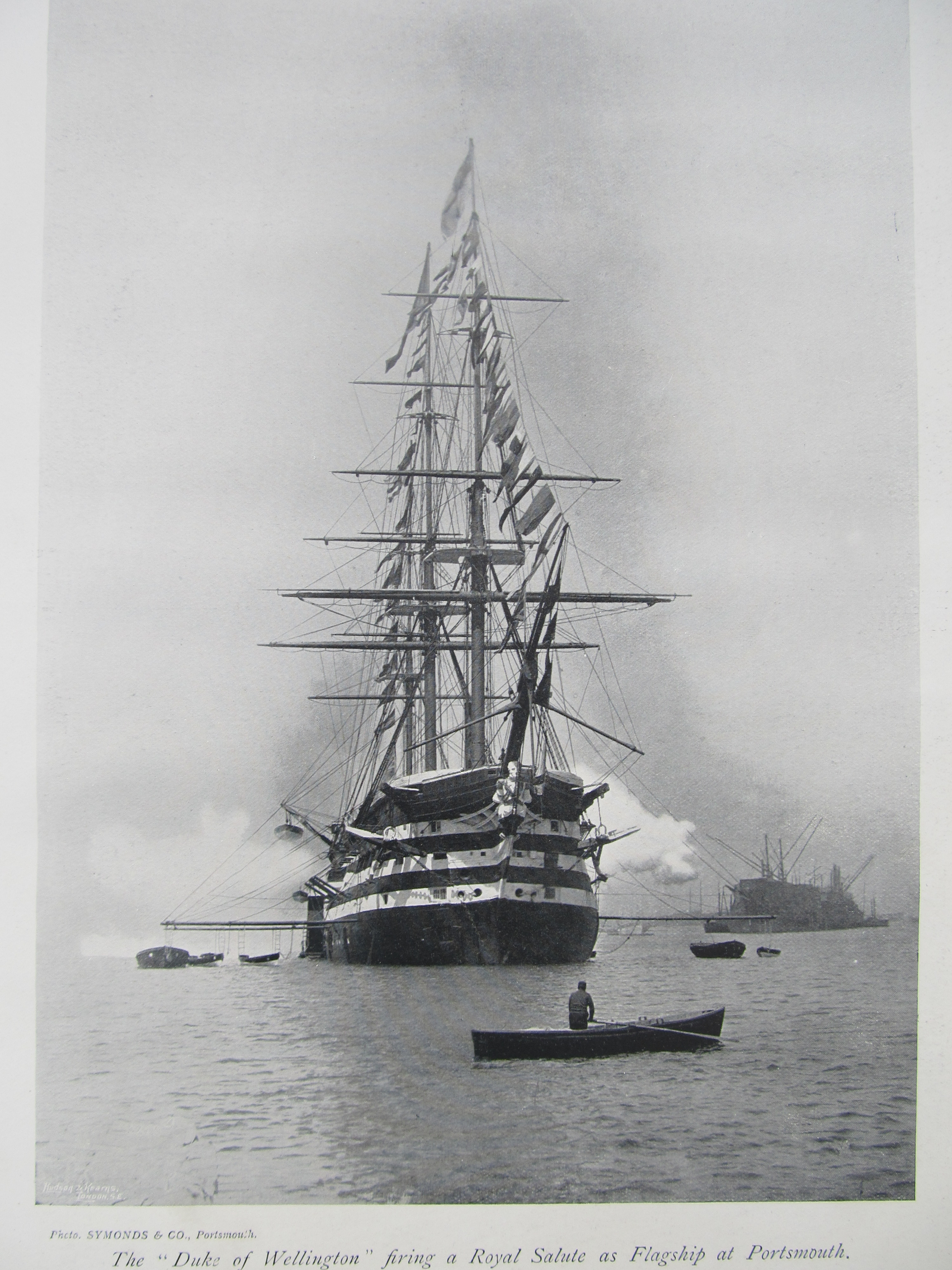
HMS Duke of Wellington firing a salute during her time as flagship in Portsmouth

Cumming was appointed captain of the 51-gun frigate HMS Emerald on her commissioning at Sheerness on 14 May 1859 and remained with the ship until the end of her Royal Navy career on 7 November 1863. The vessel was initially part of the Channel Fleet and as part of her duties visited Plymouth, Spithead, Torbay, Cork and Devonport. Cumming was reunited with his old commander, Rear-Admiral Sir Alexander Milne, when Emerald became his temporary flagship on 19 January 1860 in order to carry him to the West Indies where he was to replace Vice Admiral Sir Houston Stewart, another former shipmate, as Commander-in-Chief on the North America and West Indies Station. Emerald left Devonport on 18 February and arrived at Bermuda 19 days and 6 hours later, completing "one of the quickest passages on record" at the time. The feat is all the more impressive for the fact that Cumming relied almost entirely on sail power, engaging the steam engines only when he was within 500 nautical miles (930 km) of her destination. Whilst in Bermuda Emerald ran aground and tore her coppering, the first of several times she was damaged in her career.

Cumming and Emerald returned to Plymouth on 4 July 1860 and was heading to Keyham steam-yard on 10 July when she ran aground on a beach at Hamoaze whilst trying to avoid a merchant brig under tow, this and the Bermuda grounding were found to have damaged 60 feet (18 m) of her coppering. Cumming was next ordered to Alderney, in the Channel Islands to transport a replacement Royal Artillery garrison. On the return journey on 28 August the ship ran aground once more, whilst in the charge of a Trinity House pilot, necessitating more repairs. In September Cumming sailed to Antwerp to provide a British presence and salute to Queen Victoria who was passing through the port. Cumming made another trip to South America in April 1861 when he carried Rear-Admiral Richard Laird Warren in Emerald to his new appointment as Commander-in-Chief of the Brazil Station, returning with Rear-Admiral Sir Henry Keppel.

On his return Cumming was again ordered to America, transporting guns, shot and stores to the West India Squadron, but was hit by storms off Newfoundland and forced to turn back to Plymouth. Once again Emerald was damaged, losing three boats, damaging rigging and equipment and being said to leak "like a sieve". This necessitated another period of repair in Keyham, before Cumming set out for Brazil once more, this time encountering storms in the Bay of Biscay and again being damaged and repaired in dock. Emerald saw service in the Baltic and participated in propeller trials for the Admiralty but was decommissioned in 1863 and sold in 1869.

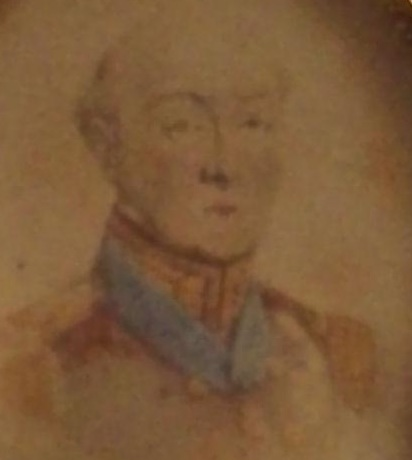
Arthur Cumming in Admiral's uniform

Cumming was appointed a Companion of the Order of the Bath on 13 May 1867. In November of that year he became part of the Royal Navy's Packet Service and served in that role as an additional captain in HMS Victory, under the command of Captains Frederick Beauchamp Paget Seymour and George Le Geyt Bowyear. During this time Victory served as the flagship of the Port Admiral of Portsmouth and Cumming transferred to HMS Duke of Wellington when she became the flagship on 2 March 1869. Cumming remained on the Duke of Wellington, on harbour service duties, until 26 February 1870.

== Admiral ==
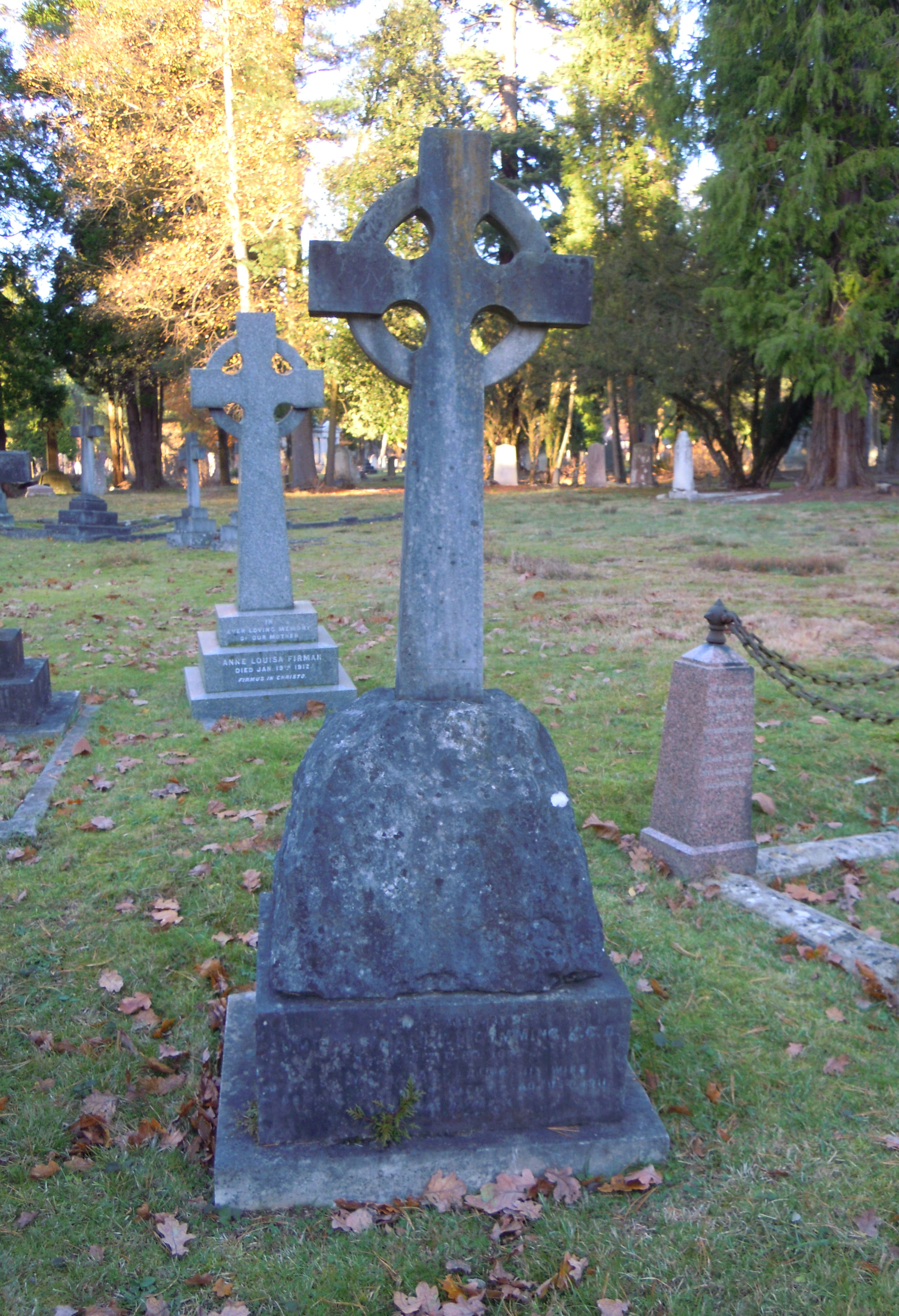
Cumming's grave in Brookwood Cemetery

Cumming's service aboard the Duke of Wellington ended with his promotion to rear-admiral on 27 February 1870. He served for a while as a port admiral before being appointed, on 14 February 1872, Commander-in-Chief, East Indies. There he was involved in suppressing the slave trade around Zanzibar (see Kenya Army#History). He remained in the East Indies until March 1875 and was promoted to vice-admiral on 22 March 1876. Cumming's promotion to admiral came on 9 January 1880 and he retired from the service on 6 April 1882.

After retirement, he lived mainly at Foston Hall, near Derby. Cumming was a keen patron of his former shipmates including Surgeon William Loney, who had served aboard Emerald, which Cumming had captained, and Glasgow, part of his East Indies squadron.

In 1877, Cumming wrote to Vice-Admiral Beauchamp Seymour, 1st Baron Alcester, Commander-in-Chief of the Channel Squadron, and Lord Gillford, Lord Commissioner of the Admiralty, to recommend Loney for promotion. Cumming was appointed Knight Commander of the Order of the Bath as part of Queen Victoria's Golden Jubilee celebrations on 21 June 1887.

Cumming became an early victim of identity theft on 27 March 1888 when a man impersonating him stole goods worth 100,000 francs (equivalent to approximately £450,000 in current terms) from a Nice jewellery shop. The thief had identified himself to the shop's owner, Mr Boxta, as "Admiral Sir Arthur Cumming" and presented a card in that name with Cumming's coat of arms printed on it. Having made a small purchase the thief requested that Boxta bring a large quantity of diamond rings, bracelets and a necklace to his rooms so that he could choose a present for his wife. Boxta was reassured by the high status neighbourhood and a pile of Bank of England notes that the thief showed him and allowed the thief to take the jewellery to an adjacent room from which he was able to escape. The thief was never caught.

Sir Arthur Cumming died in London on 17 February 1893. He was survived by his wife and is buried in Brookwood Cemetery, Surrey.

== See also ==
- O'Byrne, William Richard (1849). "Cumming, Arthur" . A Naval Biographical Dictionary . John Murray – via Wikisource.

== Sources ==
Laughton, John Knox (1901). "Cumming, Arthur" . In Lee, Sidney (ed.). Dictionary of National Biography (1st supplement). London: Smith, Elder & Co.

Military offices
Preceded by James Cockburn	Commander-in-Chief, East Indies Station; 1872–1875	Succeeded by Sir Reginald Macdonald
