= Jeddah massacre of 1858 =

1858 massacre

- Location: Jeddah, Ottoman Empire (present-day Saudi Arabia)
- Date: 15 June 1858
- Target: Christians
- Attack type: Massacre
- Deaths: 21 Christian residents
- Injuries: 24 mostly Greeks
- Perpetrator: Hadramites

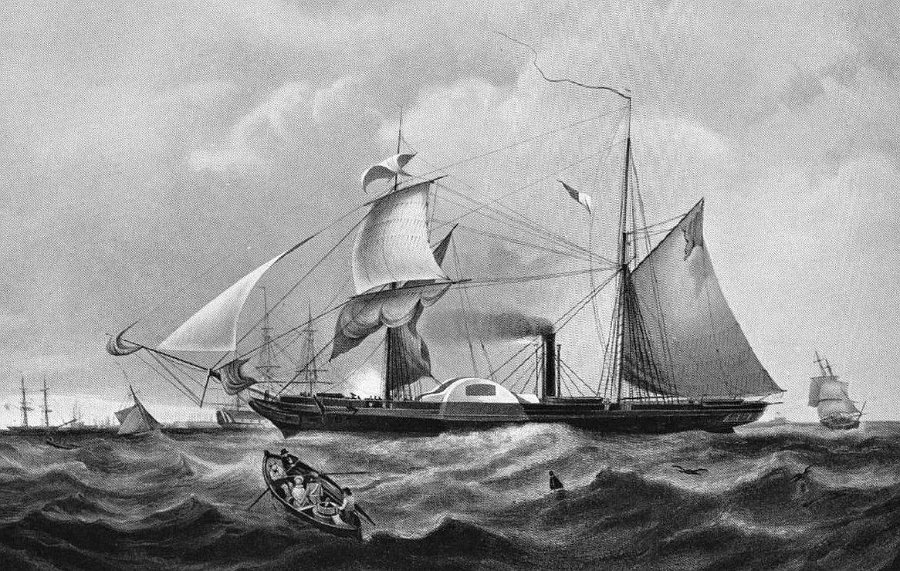
HMS Cyclops (1839), which rescued some survivors of the massacre

The Jeddah massacre of 1858 is a massacre that took place in Jeddah in the then Ottoman Province of Hejaz on 15 June 1858. The massacre targeted Christians and resulted in the death of 21 people.

== Background ==
The Province of Hejaz had been in a tense situation since the Hejaz rebellion of 1855–1856, during which the sharif and ulema of Mecca had opposed the new anti-slave decree of 1854 proclaimed by of the Ottoman governor as influenced by Westerners and contrary to Islamic law. When the Firman of 1857 against the trade in African slaves was introduced, affecting the Red Sea slave trade, Hijaz was again disturbed by violent opposition, which caused the Hijaz Province to be excluded from obeying the law. The anti-slavery policy, which had been introduced after Western pressure, caused hostility toward Westerners in Hejaz, and during the rebellion houses belonging to French and British proteges had been attacked during riots in Jeddah and Mecca.

== Events ==
On 15 June 1858, 21 Christian residents of Jeddah, which was then an Ottoman town of 5,000 predominantly Muslim inhabitants, were massacred, including the French consul Élise Éveillard and his wife, and the British vice-consul Stephen Page, by "some hundreds of Hadramites, inhabitants of Southern Arabia". 24 others, mostly Greeks, some "under British protection" plus the daughter of the French consul Elise Eveillard and the French interpreter M. Emerat, both badly wounded, escaped and took refuge, some by swimming to it, in the steam paddle wheel frigate HMS Cyclops.

== Aftermath ==
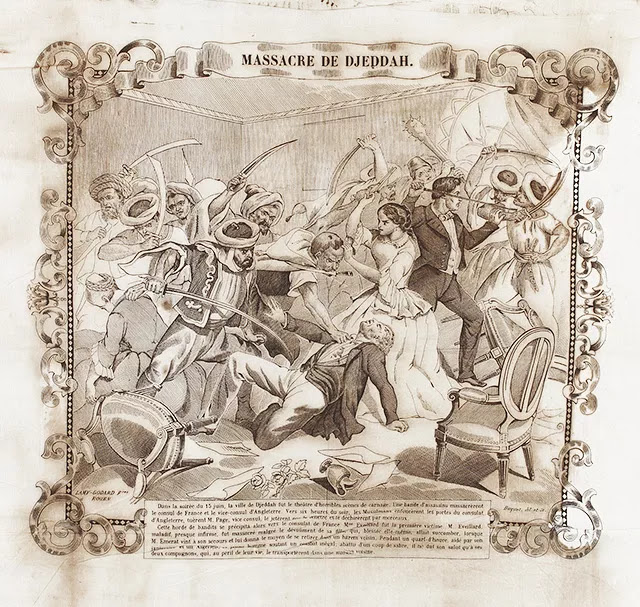
French engraving depicting the death of the consul Élise Éveillard and his wife during the Jeddah massacre.

Whereas The Church of England quarterly review (1858) suggested there could be a vague connection to the British suppression of the Indian Rebellion of 1857–1859, and The Spectator wrote that "A Sheik from Delhi is said to have instigated the massacre", the Perth Gazette of 22 October 1858 extensively quoted an interview in the Moniteur of M. Emerat, the French dragoman (interpreter) and chancellor. According to him, the events were provoked by a commercial dispute which ended by the rehoisting of the British flag on an Indian ship and the hauling down of the Ottoman one, which provoked a riot. He added that the "agitators" actually resented the presence of non-Muslims "whose presence, in their eyes, defiled the sacred soil of the Hejaz".

The massacre was discussed in the British House of Commons on 12 and 22 July 1858.

According to The Church Review (1859), the Jeddah population of about 5,000 was "often much increased by the influx of strangers", "the inhabitants are nearly all foreigners, or settlers from other parts of Arabia".

== See also ==
- Istanbul pogrom
- Damascus affair (1840)
- Massacre of Aleppo (1850)
- 1955 Madaba riot
- Christianity in the Ottoman Empire
- Christianity in Saudi Arabia (pre-Saudi history section)

== Bibliography ==
- Freitag, Ulrike, "Symbolic Politics and Urban Violence in Late Ottoman Jeddah", in: Ulrike Freitag, Nelida Fuccaro, Claudia Ghrawi, Nora Lafi, Urban Violence in the Middle East: Changing Cityscapes in the Transition from Empire to Nation State, Berghahn Books, 2015
- Ochsenwald, William, 'The Jidda Massacre of 1858', Middle Eastern Studies, 13:3 (1977), 314–26
- Pétriat, Philippe, "D’une histoire locale à une histoire mondiale du massacre de Djedda (1858)", Vacarme, 1998/1 (n° 6)
- Pétriat, Philippe, "Fitna Djeddah", les Hadramis dans l'émeute du 15 juin 1858, Mémoire de Master 2, Université Paris-Sorbonne, 2010
