= HMS Conflict (1846) =

Sloop of the Royal Navy

History
- Name: HMS Conflict
- Ordered: 5 February 1845
- Builder: Pembroke Dockyard
- Laid down: July 1845
- Launched: 5 August 1846
- Commissioned: 4 October 1849
- Honours and awards: Baltic 1854–55
- Fate: Sold 1863 for breaking

General characteristics
- Type: First-class sloop
- Displacement: 1,628 tons
- Tons burthen: 1,03869/94 bm
- Length: 192 ft 6 1/2 in (58.7 m) (gundeck); 172 ft 3 1/2 in (52.5 m) (keel for tonnage)
- Beam: 34 ft 4 in (10.5 m) maximum, 34 ft 4 in (10.5 m) for tonnage
- Draught: 15 ft 9 in (4.8 m) mean
- Depth of hold: 22 ft 8 1/2 in (6.9 m)
- Installed power: 400 nhp; 772 ihp (576 kW)
- Propulsion: 4-cylinder horizontal single-expansion steam engine; Single screw
- Sail plan: Full-rigged ship
- Complement: 175
- Armament: As built: 2 × 56-pounder (85cwt) solid shot guns; 6 × 8-inch (65cwt) muzzle-loading shell guns; 2 × 32-pounder (25cwt) solid shot guns; 1857: 1 × 68-pounder (95cwt) smoothbore muzzle-loading gun; 6 × 8-inch (65cwt) muzzle-loading shell guns; 1 × 10-inch (85cwt) gun

Conflict was originally slated to be built to the Sampson designed steam vessel rated as a Steam Vessel First Class (SV1); however, the Admiralty, first rerated the vessels as First Class Sloops on 19 April 1845 then on 9 May 1845, she was ordered from a design of Sir William Symonds, Surveyor of the Navy. Originally designated as 10-gun vessels with 400 NHP engines. She served in the Baltic during the Russian war of 1854–55. She was sold for breaking in 1863.

Conflict was the fourth named vessel since its introduction for a 12-gun gun brig launched by Dudman at Deptford on 17 April 1801 and wrecked on the French Coast on 24 October 1804.

== Construction ==
Her keel was laid in July 1845 at HM Royal Dockyard, Pembroke, and launched on 5 August 1846. She was towed to Wigram's Yard, Blackwall, London to be lengthened in early 1848. The lengthening was to facilitate the installation of her propeller. During trials Conflict's engine generated 772 ihp (576 kW) for a speed of 9.4 knots. Conflict was completed for sea on 20 November 1849 at a cost of: hull – £20,496; machinery – £21,514; lengthening – £5,410; and fitting – £11,088.

== Commissioned service ==
=== First commission ===
Her first commission was on 4 October 1849 at Plymouth under Commander Thomas G. Drake, RN for service on the East Coast Of South America. She changed commanders to Acting Commander Robert Jenner, RN on 15 December 1851 before returning to Home Waters and paying off at Portsmouth on 4 June 1852.

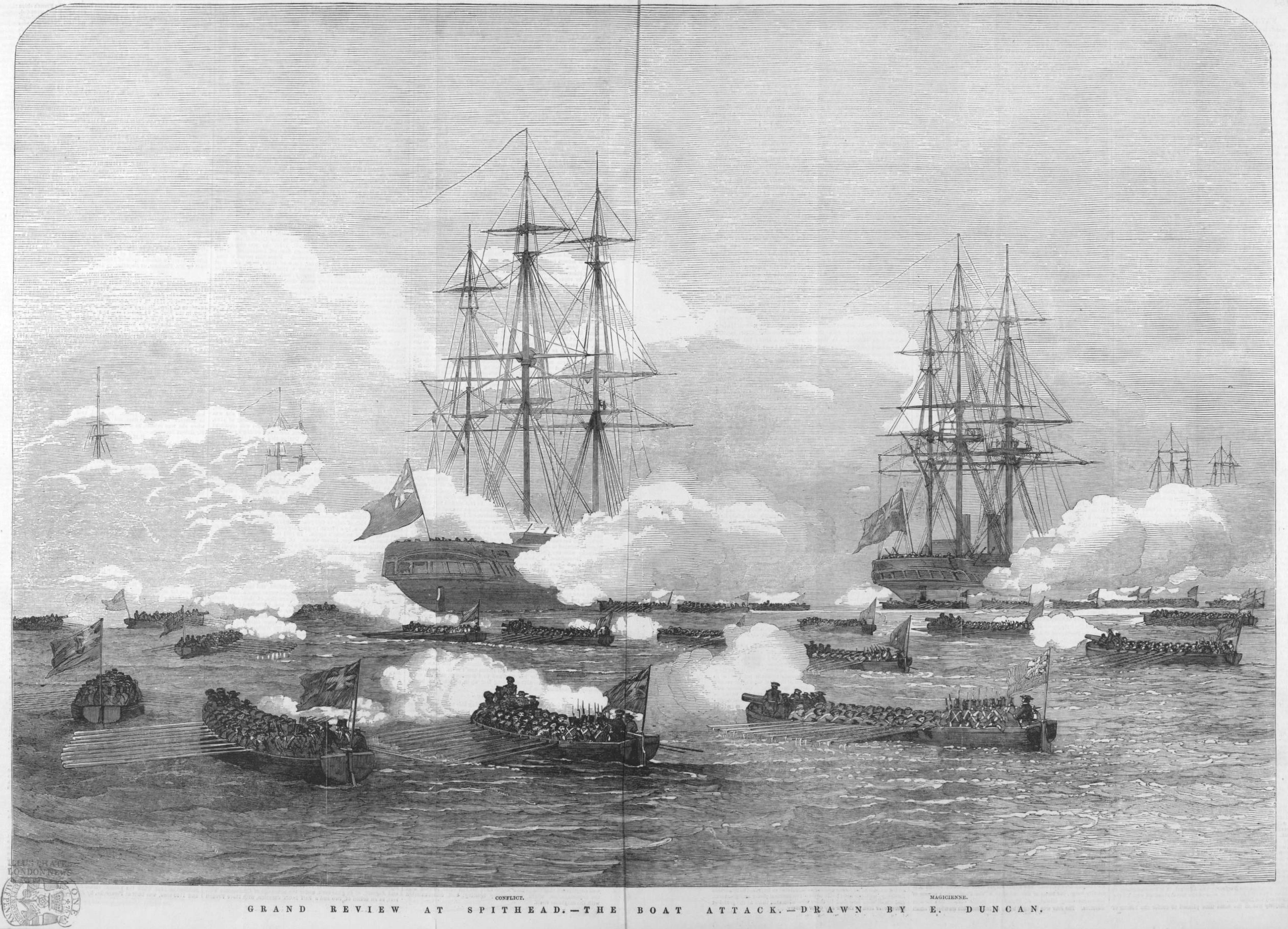
Grand Review at Spithead, 11 August 1853. Conflict and Magicienne, in a mock battle with boats. Illustrated London News 1853

=== Second commission ===
She recommissioned at Plymouth for service in the Baltic during the Russian War on 25 February 1854 under Captain John Foote, RN. Captain John Foote, was drowned off Memel (now Klaipėda in Lithuania) on 18 April 1854. Commander Arthur Cumming, RN took command on 19 April. She was involved in the actions at Liepaja and Riga. On 17 May 1854, he took Conflict and Amphion (Captain Astley Cooper Key) into Libau (modern Liepāja in Latvia), occupied the town and seized eight Russian merchant vessels, without firing a single shot. On 7 February 1855 Commander Stephen S.L. Crofton took Command. On 16 March 1855 Commander Francis T. Brown, RN took command. She returned to Devonport in June 1855. On 9 July 1855 she was under the command of Commander William Charles Chamberlain, RN. On 21 February 1856 she was under command of Commander Thomas Cochrane, RN preparing for deployment to the Mediterranean Station. She returned to Home Waters, paying off at Plymouth on 24 February 1857.

=== Third commission ===
Her last commission started on 29 August 1857 under Commander Richard W. Courtenay, RN for service on the West Coast of Africa. She returned to Home Waters at the end of 1859.

== Disposition ==
Upon her arrival in Home Waters, she paid off at Plymouth on 13 December 1859. She was sold in 1863.

HMS Conflict was awarded the Battle Honour Baltic 1854 – 55.
