= 1955 Madaba riot =

Madaba Riots 1955
- Location: Madaba
- Date: 1955
- Target: Christian Jordanians
- Attack type: Mass murder, Religious violence, Massacre
- Deaths: 60+
- Injuries: 6 Injured
- Perpetrators: Muslim Brotherhood, Hizb ut-Tahrir, Jordanian Islamists, nationalists and civilians
- Motive: Anti-Christian Sentiment; Jordanian nationalism; Islamic fundamentalism

The 1955 Madaba riot, sometimes also referred as the Madaba massacre took place in the predominantly Christians Jordanian town of Madaba, when a number of Christians were killed by Islamist rioters.

The riot seems to have begun in a dispute between Christian and Muslim taxi drivers, after which the Salt monastery was attacked by members of the pan-islamist organization Hizb ut-Tahrir, eventually transforming in into an all-out sectarian riot. It is claimed that the event was instigated by the Muslim Brotherhood and Hizb ut-Tahrir. It was also claimed that a Jordanian Parliament Member, Muhammad Salim Abu al-Ghanam, was behind the eruption of the riot.

Wide-scale riots took place the same year in December, lasting for five days. Those came as a result of an attempt to bring Jordan into the Baghdad Pact. The riots were severe – foreign consulates were attacked and many people were killed and wounded throughout the country. The riots were quelled only with the military intervention of the Arab Legion and imposition of a curfew. As a result of the riots, the Majali government fell and the introduction of Jordan into the pact was cancelled.

== See also ==
- Jeddah Massacre of 1858
- Istanbul pogrom
