= HMS Glasgow (1861) =

Frigate of the Royal Navy

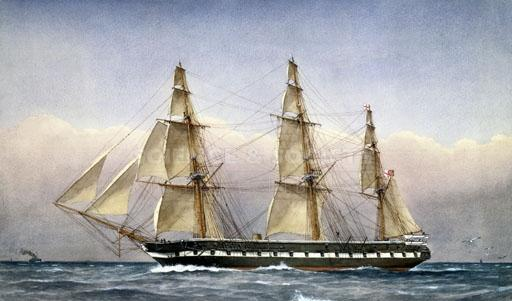
- A 1903 painting of HMS Glasgow

History

United Kingdom
- Name: Glasgow
- Builder: Portsmouth Dockyard
- Laid down: 12 September 1859
- Launched: 28 March 1861
- Completed: 1870
- Decommissioned: 20 July 1875
- Fate: Sold for breaking up December 1884

General characteristics
- Class & type: Bristol-class frigate
- Displacement: 4,020 long tons (4,080 t)
- Tons burthen: 3027
- Length: 250 ft (76.2 m)
- Beam: 52 ft 1 in (15.9 m)
- Draught: 22 ft 5 in (6.8 m)
- Installed power: 2,020 ihp (1,510 kW)
- Propulsion: 1 shaft, 1 Steam engine
- Speed: 11 knots (20 km/h; 13 mph)
- Complement: 550-600
- Armament: Thirty 8-inch (203 mm) muzzle-loading smoothbore guns; Twenty 32-pounder muzzle-loading smoothbore guns; One 68-pounder muzzle-loading smoothbore gun

HMS Glasgow was a wooden screw frigate, the fifth ship of the name to serve in the Royal Navy.

Glasgow was launched at Portsmouth Dockyard on 28 March 1861. Despite ironclad ships being introduced in 1858 and effectively rendering wooden hulls obsolete Glasgow was built of wood to use up some of the extensive stocks of ship building timber then stored in Britain. Indeed Glasgow was one of the last warships of the Royal Navy to be made entirely from wood. Her one and only foreign deployment was as flagship to the East Indies from 1871 to 1875. From 24 May 1871 until her decommissioning she was commanded by Captain Theodore Morton Jones. During this time she was the flagship of Rear-Admiral James Cockburn and then of Admiral Arthur Cumming, following Cockburn's death. Glasgow was paid off on 20 July 1875 and sold for breaking up in December 1884. Glasgow was used by Sultan Bargash of Zanzibar as the model for his royal yacht HHS Glasgow, Bargash having been impressed by the ship when she visited Zanzibar in 1873.
