= HHS Glasgow =

Royal yacht of Sultan of Zanzibar (1878–1896)

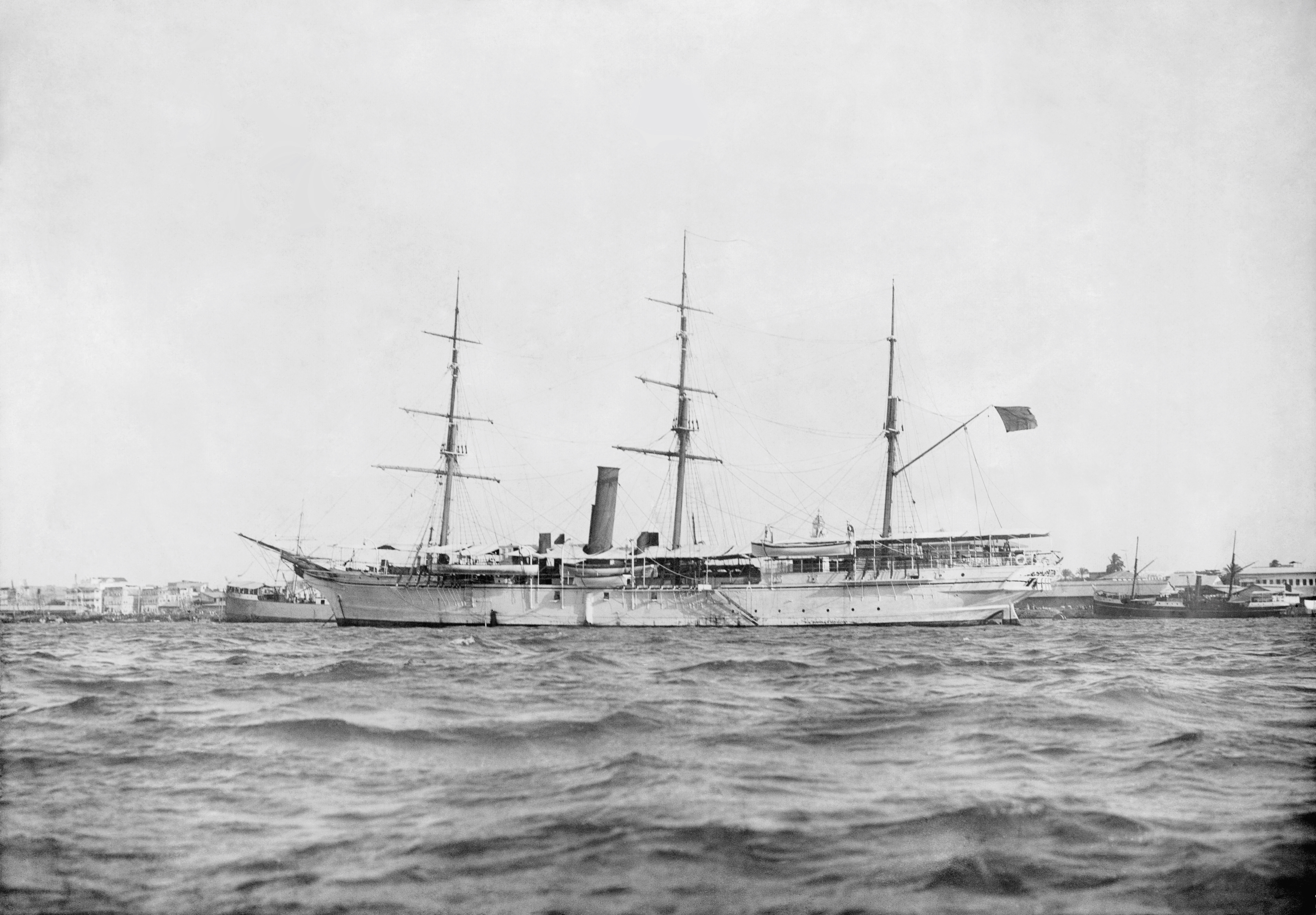
- HHS Glasgow at Zanzibar in 1890

History

Sultanate of Zanzibar
- Name: Glasgow
- Operator: Sultan of Zanzibar
- Builder: William Denny and Brothers
- Yard number: Hull 200
- Laid down: 14 May 1877
- Launched: 2 March 1878
- Out of service: 27 August 1896
- Fate: Sunk during Anglo-Zanzibar War, salvaged and broken up 1912

General characteristics
- Type: Royal yacht
- Tonnage: 736 gross register tonnage
- Displacement: 1,416 tons
- Length: 210 ft (64 m)
- Beam: 29 ft (8.8 m)
- Draft: 16 ft (4.9 m)
- Installed power: 172 nhp
- Propulsion: Single compound steam engine with two bladed lifting propeller
- Speed: 12 knots (22 km/h; 14 mph)
- Armament: 7 x RML 9-pounder; 9-barrel Gatling gun

His Highness' Ship Glasgow was a royal yacht belonging to the Sultan of Zanzibar. She was built in the style of the British frigate HMS Glasgow which had visited the Sultan in 1873. Glasgow cost the Sultan GB£32,735 (equivalent to £3.4 million in 2025) and contained several luxury features, but failed to impress the Sultan and she laid at anchor in harbour at Zanzibar Town for much of her career. She was brought out of semi-retirement on 25 August 1896, and two days later participated in the world's shortest war – the roughly 38-minute Anglo-Zanzibar War, where she was quickly destroyed by a flotilla of British warships, sinking a few minutes after the war ended. Glasgow's wreck remained in the harbour, her three masts and funnel projecting from the water, until 1912 when she was broken up for scrap.

== Construction ==
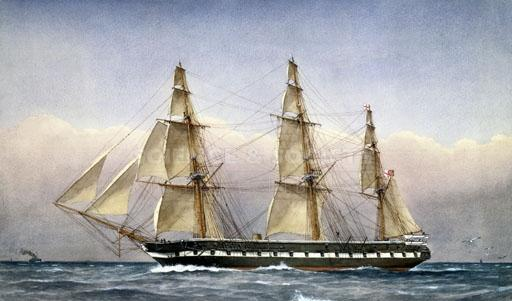
HMS Glasgow was the inspiration for her Zanzibari namesake

Glasgow was built in 1878 as a replacement for Sultan Bargash's fleet which had been lost in a hurricane in 1872. Glasgow was based upon the British Royal Navy screw frigate HMS Glasgow which had impressed the Sultan during a visit to Zanzibar in 1873. Bargash consulted with Sir William Mackinnon, the founder of the British-India Steam Navigation Company, who recommended the firm of William Denny and Brothers as shipbuilders. On 17 April 1877 Denny wrote to Bargash's agents promising to build "a vessel in every way a handsome and substantial piece of work" and on 14 May 1877 the ship was laid down as "Hull 200".

Glasgow was constructed with an iron frame covered with teak planks and a keel made from rock elm. She measured 210 ft (64 m), 29 ft (8.8 m) and 16 ft (4.9 m). Glasgow had a displacement of 1,416 long tons (1,439 t) and a gross register tonnage of 736., the hull was sheathed with Muntz metal below the waterline to provide protection against shipworms. Glasgow was equipped with three masts and a single-cylinder 172 nominal horsepower steam engine. She had a single lifting propeller and was capable of reaching 12 knots (22 km/h; 14 mph).

Glasgow was well fitted out for its role as a royal yacht and contained two state rooms, a dining saloon, a bathroom and a water closet for use by the Sultan. In all, she cost GB£32,735 (equivalent to £3.4 million in 2025) and was fitted out with seven rifled, muzzle-loading nine-pounder cannon and a nine-barrelled Gatling gun, courtesy of Queen Victoria. She set sail for Zanzibar from Portsmouth on 17 April 1878 under the command of Captain Hand of the Royal Navy. Upon arrival in Zanzibar Town, the Sultan inspected his new purchase and was unimpressed. Glasgow was much smaller than its namesake, the British frigate. The discrepancy arose from confusion when the ship's specifications were agreed between the sultan's representatives and local mercantile firm Smith Mackenzie & Company in Zanzibar. Barghash complained of the "unfair treatment he has obtained from the contractors" and disputed the payment for the vessel. The disagreement hampered negotiations for a proposed lease by Mackinnon on Dar-es Salaam on the East African mainland. The ship lay at anchor in harbour through the rest of the Sultan's reign and that of his three successors until 1896.

== Anglo-Zanzibar War ==
On 25 August 1896 a new Sultan, Khalid, ascended to the sultancy without first consulting the British authorities, as required by treaty. This sparked the Anglo-Zanzibar War. On 27 August the now obsolete Glasgow, the sole vessel of the Zanzibar Navy, fired upon a flotilla of five British ships, led by the cruiser HMS St George with its 9.2-inch (230 mm) guns. In return Glasgow was holed below her waterline and began sinking. Her crew hoisted the British flag as a token of surrender and all were rescued by British sailors in launches. The ship eventually sank at 10:45 am that day, settling on the harbour bed with just its masts and funnel projecting from the water.

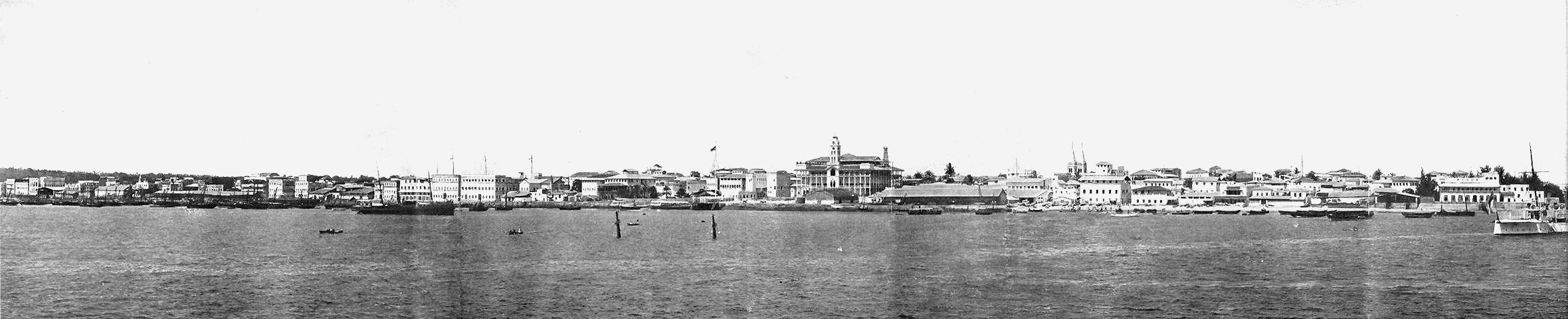
The tips of the masts of the sunken Glasgow can be seen in this panorama of Zanzibar Town harbour taken in 1902

Glasgow remained there until an unstable mast prompted the harbour master and the Zanzibar government to consider raising her. Eventually, in 1912, a salvage company was awarded a £2500 (equivalent to £246,890 in 2025) contract and she was broken up with explosive charges over a period of six months. The debris was disposed of at sea, her boiler, propeller and several cannon being sold for scrap. Several sections of iron frames remain intact on the harbour bed together with teak planks, sheets of Muntz metal, iron ballast blocks and the remains of the steam engine and propeller shaft. The site is occasionally visited by sports divers.

== Bibliography ==
- Dunn, Steve (2024), Steam Yachts at War: The Naval Deployment of British & American Yachts, 1898–1918, Barnsley, UK: Seaforth Publishing, ISBN 978-1-3990-5975-6.
- Hernon, Ian (2003), Britain's Forgotten Wars, Stroud, Gloucestershire: Sutton Publishing, ISBN 0-7509-3162-0.
- Munro, J. Forbes (2003), Maritime Enterprise and Empire: Sir William Mackinnon and His Business Network, 1823-93, Woodbridge, UK: Boydell Press, ISBN 978-0-85115-935-5.
- Patience, Kevin (1995), Zanzibar and the Shortest War in History, Bahrain: Kevin Patience.
