= Astley Cooper Key =

Royal Navy Admiral (1821–1888)

Admiral The Right Honourable Sir Astley Cooper Key GCB ADC FRS
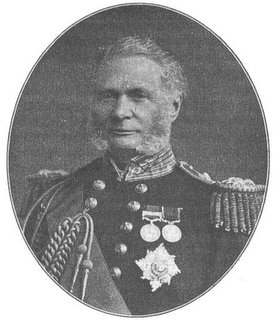
- Sir Astley Cooper Key
- Born: 18 January 1821; London, England
- Died: 3 March 1888 (aged 67); Maidenhead, Berkshire, England
- Military career
- Allegiance: United Kingdom
- Branch: Royal Navy
- Service years: 1833–1886
- Rank: Admiral
- Commands: First Naval Lord; North America and West Indies Station; Royal Naval College, Greenwich; HMS Sans Pareil; HMS Amphion; HMS Bulldog; HMS Admiralty
- Conflicts: Anglo-French blockade of the Río de la Plata; Crimean War; Second Opium War
- Awards: Knight Grand Cross of the Order of the Bath

Admiral Sir Astley Cooper Key, GCB, ADC, FRS (18 January 1821 – 3 March 1888) was a Royal Navy officer. As a junior officer he saw action at the Battle of Vuelta de Obligado in November 1845 during the Anglo-French blockade of the Río de la Plata and took part at the Battle of Bomarsund in August 1854 and the Bombardment of Sveaborg in August 1855 during the Crimean War. He also went ashore with the naval brigade to take part in the Battle of Canton in December 1857 during the Second Opium War. He later commanded a specially-formed Baltic Fleet created in February 1878 to intimidate Russia from entering Constantinople during the closing stages of the Russo-Turkish War. He became First Naval Lord in August 1879 in which role he was primarily interested in administration and technology rather than strategy: he kept the cost of running the Navy within budgets, sanctioned the construction of six Admiral-class battleships and ensured the Navy was properly prepared for the Panjdeh Incident in 1885 when Russian forces seized Afghan territory at Panjdeh.

== Early career ==
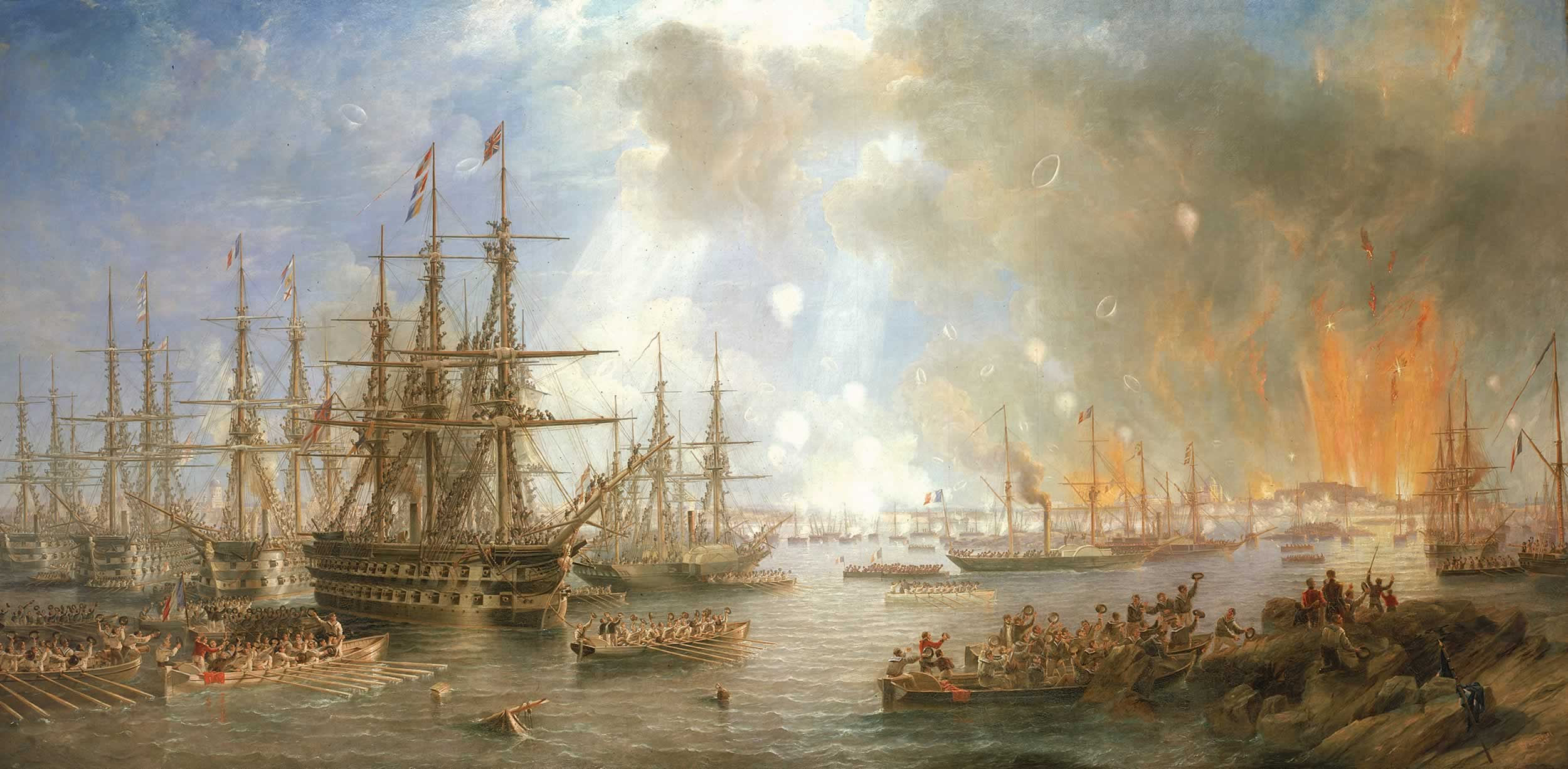
As a junior officer Astley Key was present at the Bombardment of Sveaborg in August 1855

Astley Cooper Key was the son of Charles Aston Key, a well-known surgeon, and Anne Key (née Cooper). His father was a pupil of the pioneering surgeon Astley Cooper. Key joined the Royal Navy in August 1833. After initial training at the Royal Navy College at Portsmouth, he spent his early career in the third-rate HMS Russell in the Mediterranean Fleet and then, from 1839, in the sixth-rate HMS Cleopatra on the North America and West Indies Station.

Promoted to lieutenant on 22 December 1842, Key was posted to the fifth-rate HMS Curacoa on the South America Station. In February 1844 he transferred to the steam frigate HMS Gorgon and was in acting command of the schooner HMS Fanny at the Battle of Vuelta de Obligado in November 1845 during the Anglo-French blockade of the Río de la Plata. Promoted to commander on 18 November 1845, he was given command of the paddle sloop HMS Bulldog in the Mediterranean Fleet in May 1847. Promoted to captain on 11 October 1850, he then took command of the steam frigate HMS Amphion in November 1853 and saw service in the Crimean War. In May 1854, HMS Amphion and the steam screw frigate HMS Conflict captured the town of Liepāja, a town of some 10,000 inhabitants, in Latvia without a shot being fired. He also took part at the Battle of Bomarsund in August 1854 and the Bombardment of Sveaborg in August 1855. He was appointed a Companion of the Order of the Bath on 5 July 1855.

Key took command of the third-rate HMS Sans Pareil on the East Indies and China Station in January 1856 and went ashore with the naval brigade to take part in the Battle of Canton in December 1857 during the Second Opium War. He was appointed a member of the Royal Commission on the Defence of the United Kingdom in August 1859, became captain of the steam reserve at Devonport in July 1860 and went on to be captain of HMS Excellent and superintendent of the Royal Navy College at Portsmouth in July 1863.

== Senior command ==
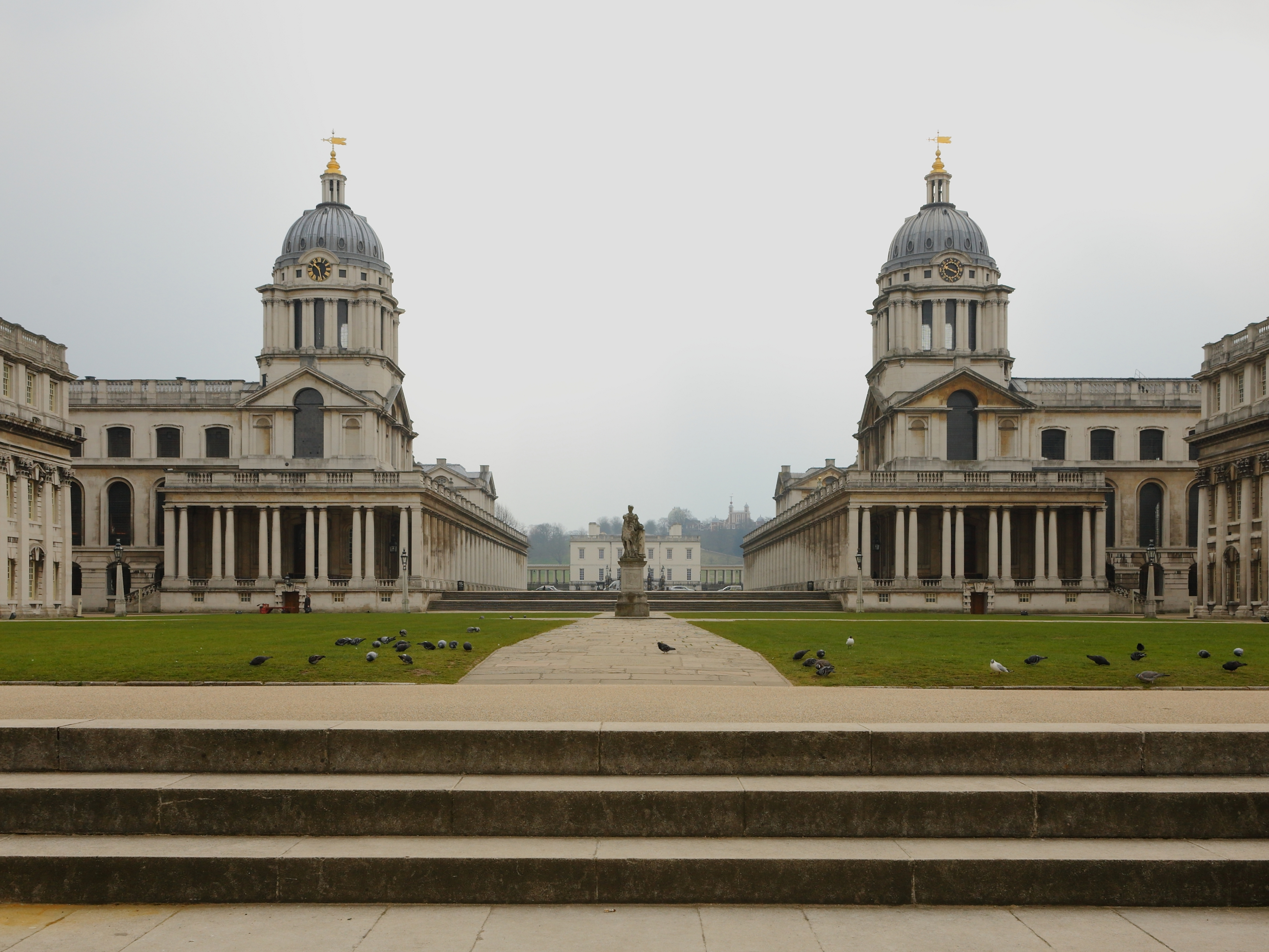
The Royal Naval College, Greenwich of which Key was president

Key had a considerable share in advising as to the reorganization of naval administration. Promoted to rear admiral on 20 November 1866, Key was made Director of Naval Ordnance and became an expert on muzzle-loading guns, this being recognised when he was elected a Fellow of the Royal Society on 4 June 1868. He went on to be Admiral Superintendent of Portsmouth Dockyard in July 1869 and Admiral Superintendent of Malta Dockyard in June 1870 and subsequently second-in-command in the Mediterranean.

Key was made President-designate of the proposed Royal Naval College, Greenwich, which was established by him and which opened the following year. He was promoted to vice admiral on 30 April 1873 and advanced to Knight Commander of the Order of the Bath on 24 May 1873. He became Commander-in-Chief of the North America and West Indies Station in December 1875 and was then asked to command a specially-formed Baltic Fleet created in February 1878 to intimidate Russia from entering Constantinople during the closing stages of the Russo-Turkish War. Promoted to full admiral on 21 March 1878, he was appointed First and Principal Naval Aides-de-Camp to the Queen on 15 June 1879.

Key became First Naval Lord in August 1879 and advanced to Knight Grand Cross of the Order of the Bath on 24 November 1882. As First Sea Lord he was primarily interested in administration and technology rather than strategy: he kept the cost of running the Navy within budgets, sanctioned the construction of six Admiral-class battleships and ensured the Navy was properly prepared for the Panjdeh Incident in 1885 when Russian forces seized Afghan territory at Panjdeh. Having been made a member of the Privy Council on 11 August 1884, he retired in June 1885 and died at his home, Laggan House, in Maidenhead on 3 March 1888.

== Family ==
On 28 April 1856 at Gonville, Jersey, Key married Charlotte Lavinia McNeil, daughter of Edmund and Rose McNeil. Astley and Charlotte's daughter was artist and author Rose Champion de Crespigny. Lady Charlotte died on 30 December 1874.

In October 1877 at Halifax, Key married, secondly, Evelyn Bartolucci, niece of the Governor of Bermuda, Major General John Lefroy, the daughter of Vincenzo Bartolucci of Rome, and the granddaughter of General Luigi Bartolucci.

== Sources ==
- Colomb, Vice-Admiral P. H. (1898). Memoirs of Admiral the Right Honourable Sir Astley Cooper Key, G.C.B., D.C.L., F.R.S. London: Methuen & Co.
- William Loney RN Career History
- Montgomery-Massingberd, Hugh (1976). Burke's Irish Family Records. London: Burke's Peerage Limited. ISBN 978-0850110180.

Military offices
Preceded by Edward Fanshawe	Admiral Superintendent, Malta Dockyard; 1870–1872	Succeeded by Edward Inglefield
New office	President, Royal Naval College, Greenwich; 1873–1875	Succeeded by Sir Edward Fanshawe
Preceded by Sir George Wellesley	Commander-in-Chief, North America and West Indies Station; 1875–1878	Succeeded by Sir Edward Inglefield
Preceded by Sir George Wellesley	First Naval Lord; 1879–1885	Succeeded by Sir Arthur Hood
Honorary titles
Preceded by Sir Henry Keppel	First and Principal Naval Aide-de-Camp; 1879–1886	Succeeded by Sir Geoffrey Hornby
