= Nora Lafi =

French historian

Nora Lafi (born 1965) is a French historian of Algerian origin.

== Biography ==
She was born in 1965 in Istres. She is currently a researcher with the Zentrum Moderner Orient (ZMO) in Berlin. She is a specialist of the history of the Ottoman Empire and specifically of Arab towns of North Africa and the Middle-East during the Ottoman period. She chairs, with Ulrike Freitag, the research field "Cities compared: cosmopolitanism in the Mediterranean and beyond", part of the EUME programme at Wissenschaftskolleg Berlin. She is co-founder and editor of H-Mediterranean (H-Net, Michigan State University).

Nora Lafi is an expert in the following fields:

- History of the Ottoman Empire
- History of Libya, Tunisia and Algeria
- The notion of old regime
- Comparative history
- Urban Studies Middle-East.

== Main publications ==
Monographies

- Esprit civique et organisation citadine dans l'empire ottoman, Leiden, Brill, 2018, 360p.
- Une ville du Maghreb entre ancien régime et réformes ottomanes. Tripoli 1795-1911, Paris, 2002

Edited and Co-Edited Books

- Understanding the City through its Margins, Abingdon, Routledge, 2017, 190p. (Ed. with U. Freitag and A. Chappatte)
- Urban Violence in the Middle East, Oxford, Berghahn, 2015, 334p. (Ed. with U. Freitag, N. Fuccaro, C. Ghrawi)
- Urban Governance Under the Ottomans, Abingdon, Routledge, 2014, 238p. (Ed. with U. Freitag)
- The City in the Ottoman Empire, Abingdon, Routledge, 2010, 288p. (Ed. with U. Freitag, M. Fuhrmann, F. Riedler)
- Municipalités Méditerranéennes, Berlin, K. Schwarz, 2005, 370p.
