= HMS Gorgon (1837) =

Sloop of the Royal Navy

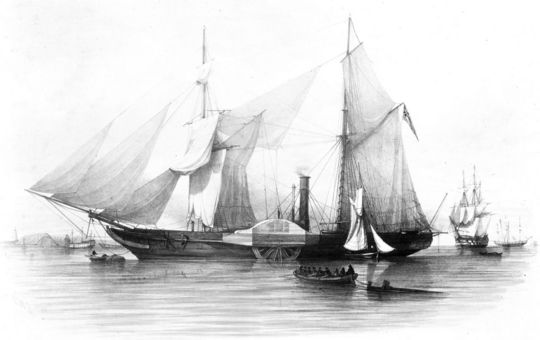
- HMS Gorgon by Sir Oswald Walters Brierly.

History

United Kingdom
- Name: HMS Gorgon
- Ordered: 10 July 1834
- Builder: Royal Dockyard, Pembroke Dock
- Laid down: July 1836
- Launched: 31 August 1837
- Commissioned: 30 August 1838
- Decommissioned: 11 February 1864
- Fate: Sold for breaking on 17 October 1864

General characteristics
- Type: Steam vessel (later, first-class sloop)
- Displacement: 1,610 long tons (1,640 t)
- Tons burthen: 1108 67/94 bm
- Length: 235 ft (71.6 m) (overall); 152 ft 2 in (46.4 m) (keel)
- Beam: 37 ft 6 in (11.4 m)
- Draught: 16 ft (4.9 m)
- Depth of hold: 23 ft (7.0 m)
- Installed power: 800 ihp (600 kW)
- Propulsion: 2-cylinder direct-acting steam engine; 4 flue boilers; 27 ft (8.2 m) Paddles
- Sail plan: Schooner (later brig)
- Speed: 9.5 kn (17.6 km/h)
- Complement: 160
- Armament: 6 guns: As built: 2 × pivot-mounted 10-inch (84 cwt) guns; 2 × 68-pdr (64 cwt) guns; 2 × 42-pdr (22 cwt) carronades; By 1856: 1 × pivot-mounted 10-inch (84 cwt) gun; 1 × pivot-mounted 68-pdr (64 cwt) gun; 4 × 32-pdr (42 cwt) guns

HMS Gorgon was a wooden steam paddle sloop of 6 guns, launched in 1837. In 1840 she took part in the bombardment of Acre, and in 1843 was part of the Royal Navy squadron stationed in the River Plate during the Uruguayan Civil War. She was converted to a troopship and in 1858 assisted Agamemnon in the laying of the first transatlantic telegraph cable. She was sold for breaking in 1864.

== Design and construction ==
Gorgon was designed by Sir William Symonds and was the first vessel to be fitted with direct-acting engines. She was teak built with oak main beams, had a displacement of 1,610 long tons (1,640 t), and her paddle wheels were 27 feet (8.2 m) in diameter. She was laid down at Pembroke Royal Dockyard in July 1836 and launched on 31 August 1837.

=== Engines ===
Gorgon had two engines of 160 horse power each, built by Seaward and Company. They were direct-acting engines, and as such they were a novel construction remarkable for compactness, strength and lightness. Each direct-acting engine placed the crankshaft directly above the center line of the cylinders and these were connected to the shaft by means of a simple connecting rod. The absence of the usual cast-iron framing, sway-beams, side-rods and crossheads saved upwards of 60 tons in weight. The absence of the sway beams and cross-head also meant that the vibration of the engines was deemed barely perceptible. The space occupied by the machinery was little over half that of side-lever engines of the same power.

For producing steam Gorgon had four copper boilers. These stood in pairs, and back to back, but nevertheless quite detached from each other. These could be used independently, allowing repairs to be made to some while others were in use. There were 12 fireplaces and two stoke-holes.

The engine room measured 62 feet from the after-bulk-head to the fore bulk-head. The coal boxes of Gorgon reached along the whole engine room and were eight feet wide on average. They allowed for storage of 400 tons of coals, or 16 days steaming.

=== Armament ===
Gorgon served with an armament of six heavy guns, but this was not according to design. The original design was for her to have a gun deck with 12 32 pdrs 56cwt, four more 32 pdrs 56cwt on the upper deck, and two 10-inch 96 pdrs on swivel beds fore and aft. After Gorgon was launched and equipped, it proved that she was so deep into the water that it was necessary to permanently close the ports meant for the guns on the gun deck.

In 1847, Gorgon had on the upper deck: one 68-pounder 90 cwt, one 10-inch gun 85 cwt, and four 32-pounders 42 cwt gun C. On the main deck it was to have one 32-pounder 56 cwt. Note that the 32-pounders 42 cwt Gun C (first tried in 1838) used on the superstructure were significantly lighter than that of 56 cwt, and there was now supposed to be one gun of 56 cwt on the main deck.

== Service ==
In 1840, Gorgon saw action with three other paddle sloops, Vesuvius, Stromboli and Phoenix, in the bombardment of the city of Acre under the command of Admiral Robert Stopford. At the height of the battle either Gorgon or the fourth-rate HMS Benbow fired the shell that destroyed Acre's powder magazine, causing an explosion that greatly weakened the city's defences.

In 1843, during the Uruguayan Civil War, Gorgon arrived in the River Plate to join the Royal Navy squadron commanded by Commodore John Purvis. She anchored in the bay as a deterrent to potential attackers. She ran aground in the River Plate on 10 May 1844 but was subsequently refloated.

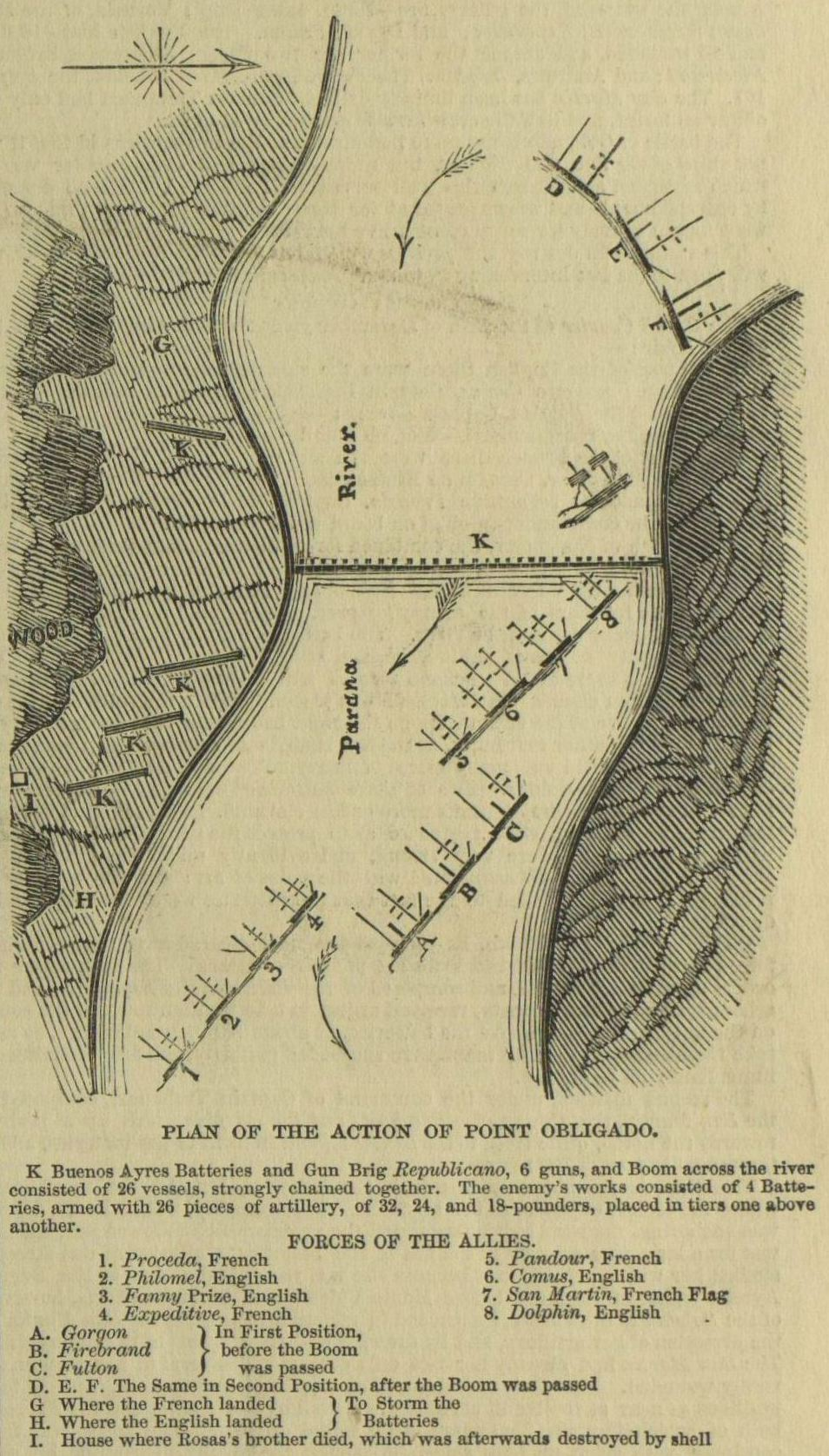
Gorgon in action at the Battle of Vuelta de Obligado in 1846

From 23 February 1854 to 8 May 1854 Gorgon was commanded by Commander (and Captain) Arthur Cumming. On 15 February 1855, she assisted HMS Caesar in the refloating of HMS Hecla, which had run aground at Gibraltar on 23 January. On 23 July, she collided with the Prussian barque Mentor in the English Channel off Beachy Head, Sussex. Mentor was severely damaged; she was towed in to The Downs in a waterlogged condition.

From August 1856 to June 1857 Gorgon was at Boudroum (modern Bodrum) under Captain George William Towsey, commissioned to transport the finds from Sir Charles Thomas Newton's excavation at the Mausoleum of Halikarnassos to the British Museum.

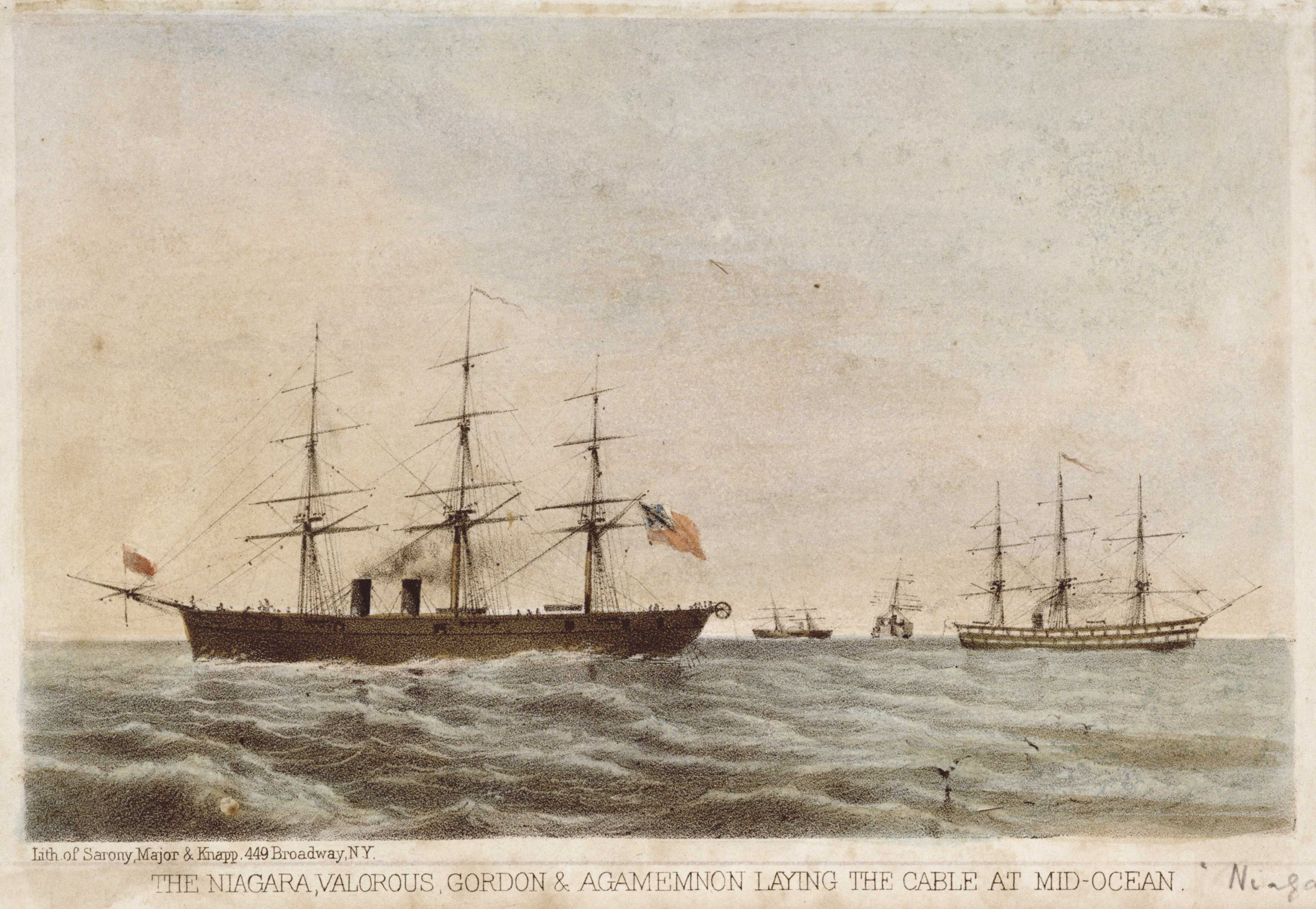
The Niagara, Valorous, Gorgon (misspelt Gordon) and Agamemnon laying the Transatlantic telegraph cable at mid-ocean in 1858

In 1858, Gorgon assisted in the laying of the first transatlantic telegraph cable by taking soundings for the former warship HMS Agamemnon, which had been converted into a cable ship. When the cable link was completed to New York, the crew of the Gorgon and the other ships were feted by civic receptions and processions through the city.

Gorgon was despatched to Madagascar in 1863 to keep the peace on the death of King Radama II. She returned via the Cape of Good Hope, arriving at Spithead on 29 January 1864. She discharged her ammunition and guns at the Royal Arsenal, was paid out of commission on 11 February.

Despite being decommissioned, Gorgon had one last mission. The vessel was towed to Greenhithe on 6 May 1864 to act as a receiving hulk for the crew of HMS Osborne, seven of whom had acquired smallpox. The ship was ultimately dismantled at Woolwich. She was sold to Charlton for breaking on 17 October 1864.

== Bibliography ==
- Colledge, J. J.; Warlow, Ben (2006) [1969]. Ships of the Royal Navy: The Complete Record of All Fighting Ships of the Royal Navy from the 15th Century to the Present (3rd Rev ed.). London: Chatham Publishing. ISBN 978-1-86176-281-8. OCLC 67375475.
- Cooper Key, Sir Astley (1847), A Narrative of the Recovery of the HMS Gorgon, London: Smith, Elder & Co., ISBN 1-84150-801-2
- Dumpleton, Bernard (2002), The Story of the Paddle Steamer, Bristol: Intellect Books, p. 174, ISBN 1-84150-801-2
- Kahanov, Yaacov; Stern, Eliezer; Cvikel, Deborah; Me-Bar, Yoav (2014), "Between Shoal and Wall: The naval bombardment of Akko, 1840", The Mariner's Mirror, 100 (2): 147–167, doi:10.1080/00253359.2014.901699, S2CID 110466181
- Lyon, David & Winfield, Rif (2004). The Sail and Steam Navy List: All the Ships of the Royal Navy 1815–1889. Chatham Publishing. ISBN 978-1-86176-032-6. OCLC 52620555.
