= HMS Erebus =

Five ships of the Royal Navy have been named HMS Erebus after Erebus, the dark region of Hades in Greek Mythology.

- HMS Erebus (1807) was a rocket vessel launched in 1807, converted to an 18-gun sloop in 1808, to a fire ship in 1809, and to a 24-gun post ship in 1810. She was sold in 1819.
- HMS Erebus (1826) was a 14-gun bomb vessel launched in 1826. She and HMS Terror took part in James Clark Ross' expedition to Antarctica from 1839 to 1843. The two ships were converted to screw propulsion in 1844, and took part in Rear Admiral Sir John Franklin's expedition to the Arctic in 1845. In 1848 their crews abandoned them after they became trapped in ice near King William Island.
- HMS Erebus (1856) was a 16-gun iron screw floating battery launched in 1856 and sold in 1884.
- HMS Erebus was an Audacious-class battleship launched in 1864 as HMS Invincible. She was renamed HMS Erebus in 1904, HMS Fisgard II in 1906 and sank in a storm in 1914.
- HMS Erebus (I02) was an Erebus-class monitor launched in 1916 and broken up in 1947.
