= HMS Amphion (1846) =

Frigate of the Royal Navy

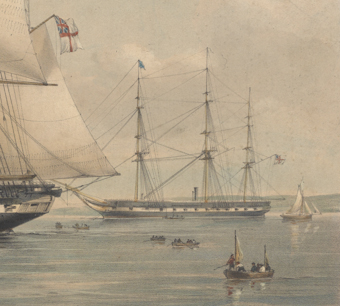
- Amphion in 1848

History

United Kingdom
- Name: HMS Amphion
- Ordered: 13 May 1828 (as sail frigate); 18 June 1844 (as screw frigate)
- Builder: Woolwich Dockyard; Machinery by Miller, Ravenhill & Co
- Laid down: 15 April 1840
- Launched: 14 January 1846
- Commissioned: 13 May 1847
- Renamed: Ordered as HMS Ambuscade, renamed HMS Amphion on 31 March 1831
- Fate: Sold for breaking up on 12 October 1863

General characteristics as built
- Class & type: 36-gun frigate
- Tons burthen: 1474 bm
- Length: 177 ft (53.9 m) (gundeck)
- Beam: 43 ft 2 in (13.2 m)
- Draught: 19 ft 2 in (5.8 m)
- Propulsion: 2-cylinder (48in diam., 48in stroke) horizontal single expansion, direct acting engine; Single screw; 300 nhp (592 ihp)
- Sail plan: Full-rigged ship
- Speed: 6.75 knots (12.5 km/h)
- Complement: 320
- Armament: 36 guns; Middle deck: 6 × 8in (65cwt) shell guns + 14 × 32-pounder (56cwt); Upper deck: 2 × 68-pounder 95 cwt + 14 × 32-pounder (42cwt)

HMS Amphion was a 36-gun wooden hulled screw frigate of the Royal Navy. She was initially ordered as a sail powered ship, but later reordered as a prototype screw frigate conversion.

== Design and construction ==
Amphion was initially planned and ordered from Woolwich Dockyard as HMS Ambuscade on 13 May 1828, but was renamed on 31 March 1831. She was laid down on 15 April 1840, but on 18 June 1844 she was reordered as a screw propelled frigate, to a design by White. She was duly launched on 14 January 1846, and commissioned on 13 May 1847. Her engines and machinery were provided by Miller, Ravenhill & Co, to a design by John Ericsson. Amphion had cost £36,115 for her hull, with a further £16,673 spent on buying and fitting the machinery, which was installed at the East India Docks. A further £22,794 was spent on fitting her for sea, which was carried out at Sheerness. The space taken up by the machinery was found to considerably restrict the amount available to store provisions and munitions.

== Career ==
She was reduced to 30 guns in 1848, but had been restored to 36 guns in 1856.

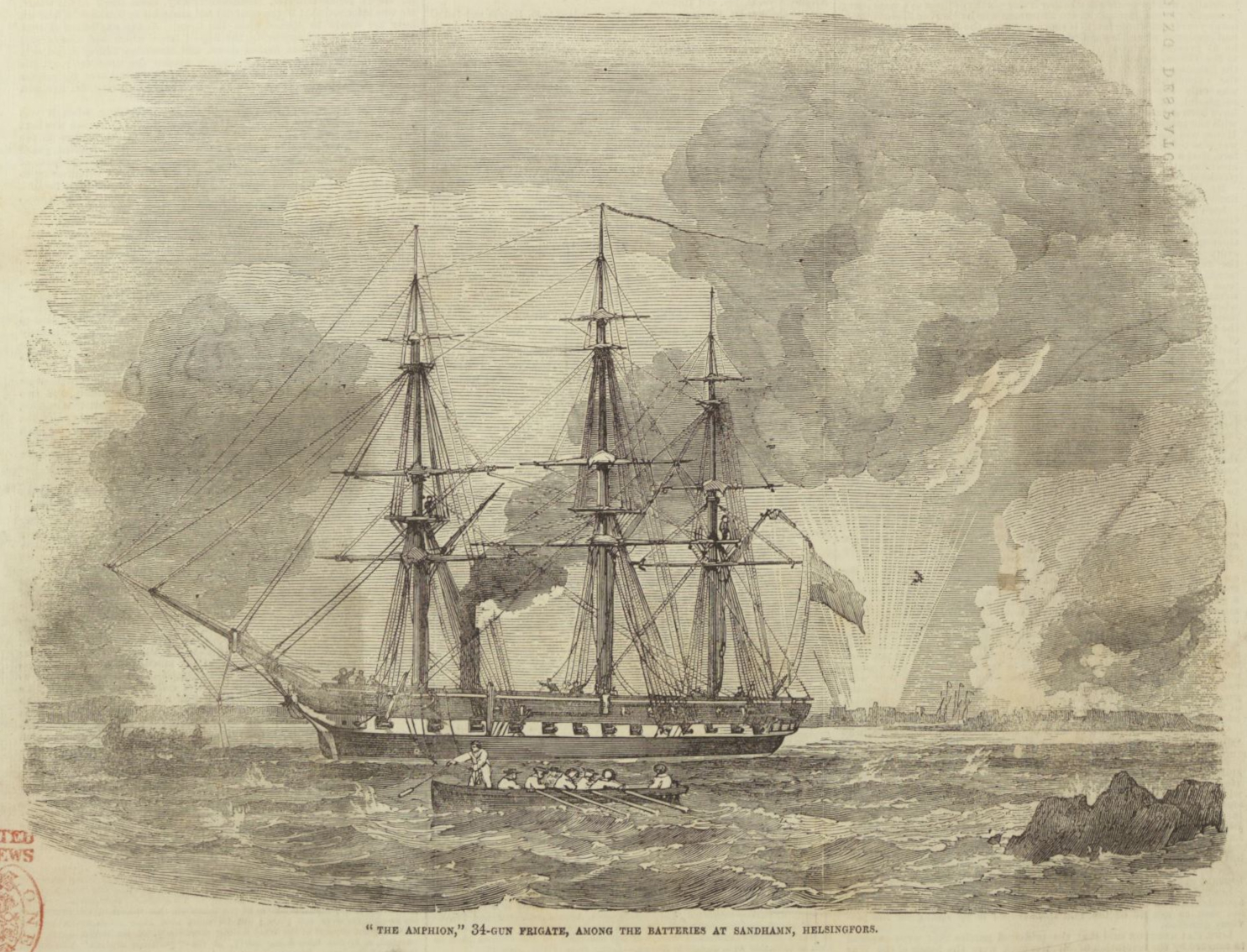
The Amphion among the batteries at Sandhamn, Helsingfors in 1855

During the Crimean War, she served in the Baltic Sea. In June 1855, she ran aground at Sveaborg, Grand Duchy of Finland and was fired on by Russian artillery. One of her crew was killed and two were injured. She was sold to Williams on 12 October 1863 to be broken up.

== See also ==
- List of ship names of the Royal Navy
