= George Pechell Mends =

Captain in the Royal Navy, and prolific sketcher

George Pechell Mends (baptized 10 May 1815 – 15 September 1871) was an English sailor and amateur artist.

He joined the Royal Navy in 1824, first serving on his father's ship. After ten years, he became an officer and served on several other ships. His first command was HMS Pioneer and his subsequent commands were HMS Nimrod and HMS Edgar. When the latter was paid off in 1866, he retired as a captain on half-pay. Throughout his service on naval stations all over the world, he painted watercolours which typically showed ships and nautical landscapes.

== Early life ==
George Pechell Mends was baptized on 10 May 1815 at St Budeaux, Plymouth, Devon, England. He was born into a notable Pembrokeshire naval family. His father was Vice Admiral William Bowen Mends, whose brother, George's uncle, was Commodore Sir Robert Mends (c. 1767–1823). His own elder brother was Admiral Sir William Robert Mends GCB (27 February 1812 – 26 June 1897), and a younger brother was to become a captain in the Royal Navy. He was the first child to go to sea. Mends grew up in Haverfordwest. He formally entered the Navy on 9 February 1824 as a volunteer on his father's ship HMS Blanche.

== Maritime career ==
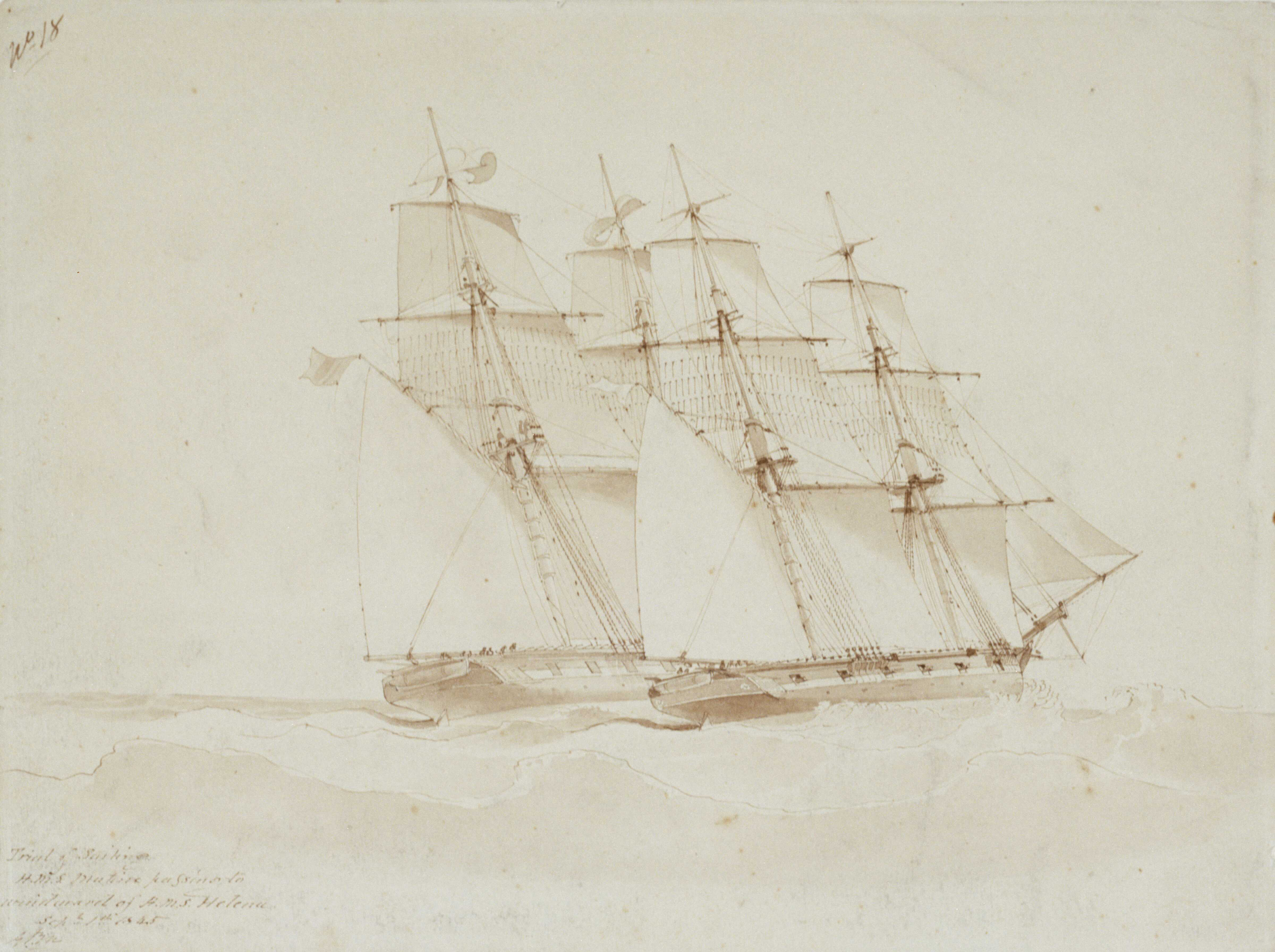
HMS Mutine (right), with Mends on board, passing to windward of HMS Helena during a sailing trial, 1 September 1845

Mends passed his lieutenant's exam on 1 April 1834. He served as mate from around 1840 of the steam paddle-driven Lizard-class gunvessel HMS Locust, which was under the command of Lieutenant-Commander John Lunn, in the Mediterranean. He was first commissioned to the rank of lieutenant on 30 August 1841, and in September was appointed to HMS Malabar, of 72 guns, Captain Sir George Rose Sartorius commanding, in the Mediterranean. In October 1844, he was appointed senior to the brig HMS Mutine, of 12 guns, Captain Richard Borough Crawford, which was attached to the force at the Cape of Good Hope, and from there on 17 October appointed, in a similar capacity, his first lieutenant on HMS Eurydice, 22, Captain Talavera Vernon Anson. Mend's agents were Messrs. Ommanney of Portsmouth. On 25 July 1850 he became first lieutenant in the 120-gun HMS Trafalgar at Sheerness under Montagu Stopford. In July 1851 Mends sailed in her for the Mediterranean (Stopford was later relieved by Henry Francis Greville), until 11 January 1854, when he was promoted Commander. From 23 January that year Mends was second-in-command to Captain George Elliot on the 91-gun HMS James Watt at Portsmouth, and served on her in the Baltic campaign of the Crimean War (1854–55). On 8 February 1856, still as Commander, Mends took command of HMS Pioneer on the North American and West Indies station. Next, on 1 May 1858 he assumed command of a wood screw-gunboat HMS Nimrod in the East Indies and China; he was promoted to Captain on 20 December 1858. From 22 May 1861 to 10 July 1862 Mends was appointed flag captain of HMS Edgar, a screw-propelled 91-gun second rate launched in 1858, under Rear-Admiral John Elphinstone Erskine, who was second-in-command in the Channel. From December 1861 Mends was appointed to the North American and West Indies stations. Edgar arrived in the Bahamas in January 1862 in time to see salvage operations on HMS Conqueror on Rum Cay. Mends remained on Edgar until the ship was paid off at Portsmouth. On 24 March 1866 Mends went on the retired captains list. At the time of his death he was on half pay, as he had been for several years.

== Art career ==
Sketches and watercolours by Mends survive from as early as 1838 and as late as 1865. Over 80 of these works are in the collection of the National Maritime Museum, more than half of which are from a sketchbook that covers the period of 1850 to 1853, immediately before and during his time on HMS Trafalgar, with some examples in private hands. The lithographer and artist Thomas Goldsworthy Dutton used some of his work, and other notable artists also copied it.

== Death ==
Mends died of heart disease, which he had been suffering from for some time, on 15 September 1871, at his home in Seaton Terrace, off Mutley Plain, in Plymouth. He was 56 years old when he died, though obituaries at the time variously gave his age as "in his sixtieth year" and "about 60 years".

He had married Louise Wilcocks from Exeter, while on leave from HMS Trafalgar on 10 July 1851. His daughter Mary Louise, an only child, married Captain Arnold John Errington RN in Exeter on 1 May 1877.

== Gallery ==
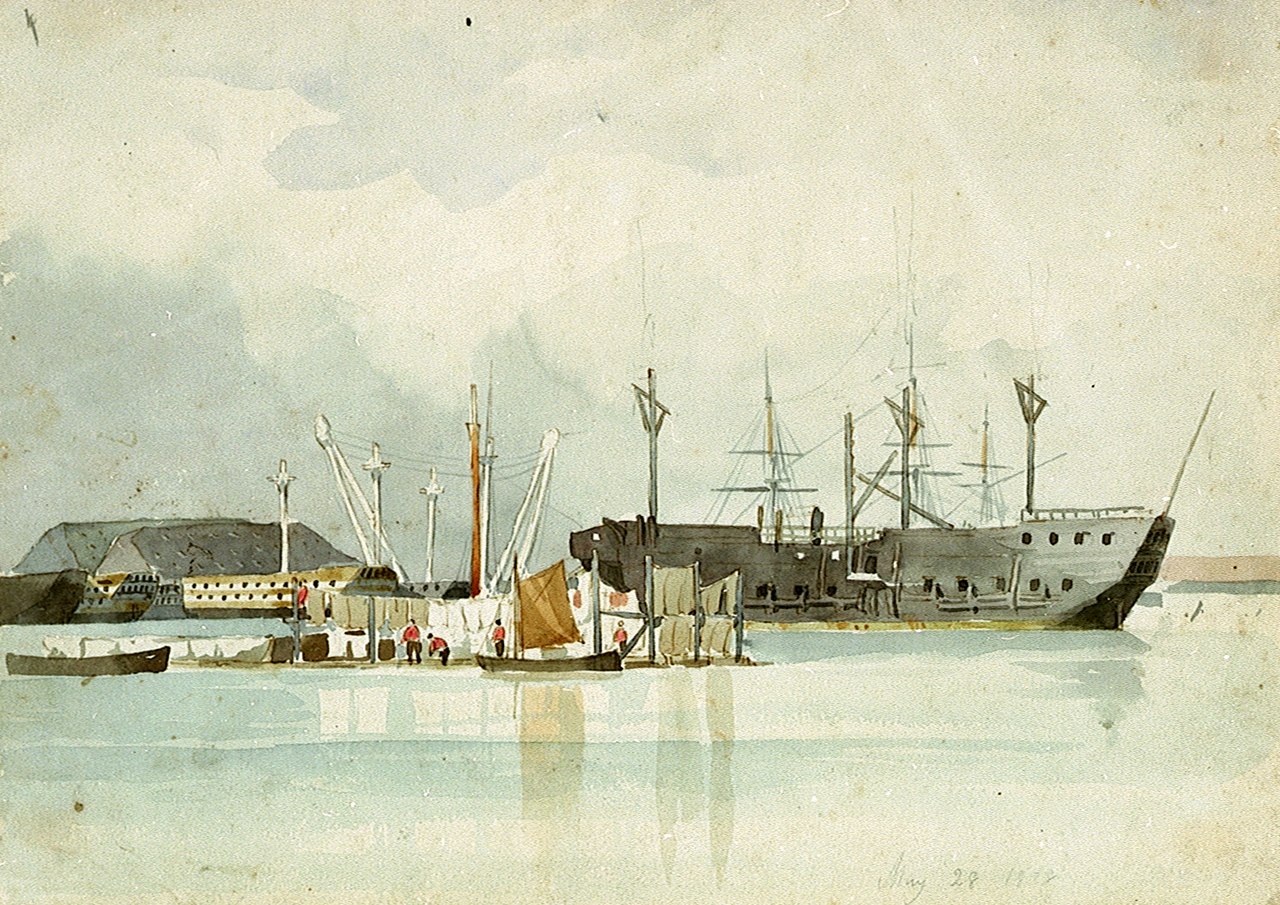
Hulks, probably at Sheerness, 1838, watercolour

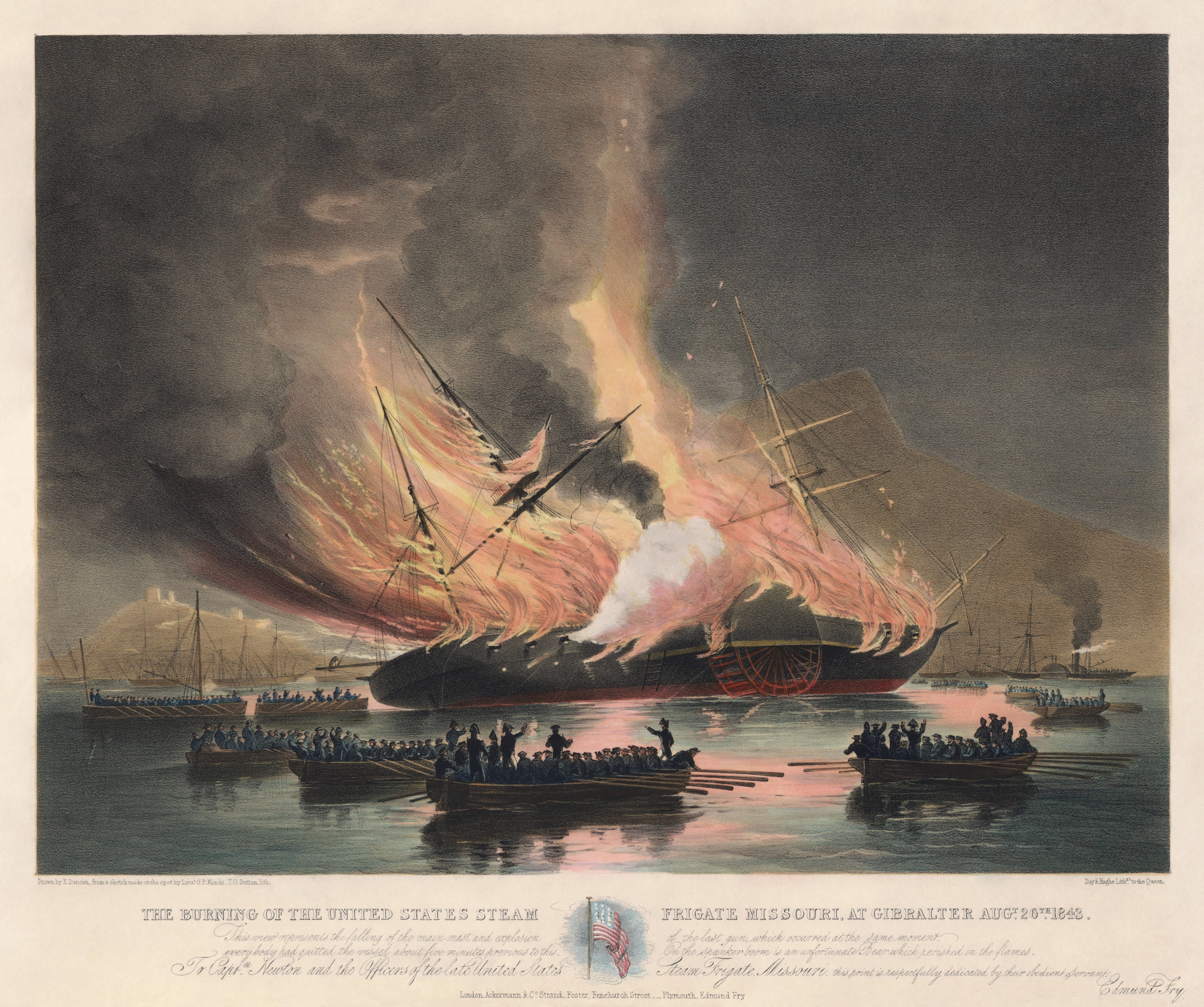
Mends was a witness to the burning of the United States steam frigate USS Missouri at Gibraltar 26 August 1843. His sketch was the basis for a painting by Edward Duncan. This litho from Thomas Goldsworthy Dutton is from that work.

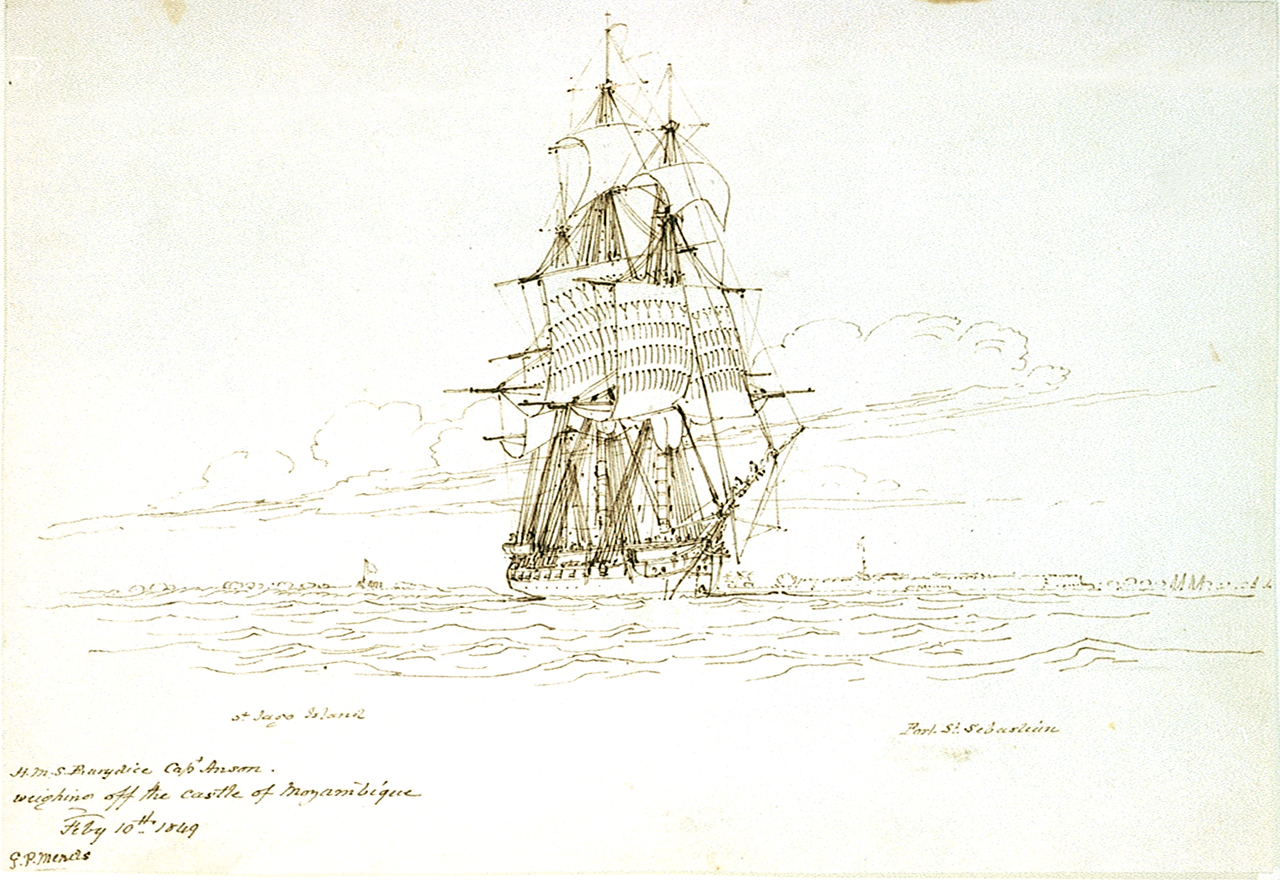
HMS Eurydice weighing anchor off Fort St Sebastian, Mozambique, 10 February 1849. Mends was her senior lieutenant.

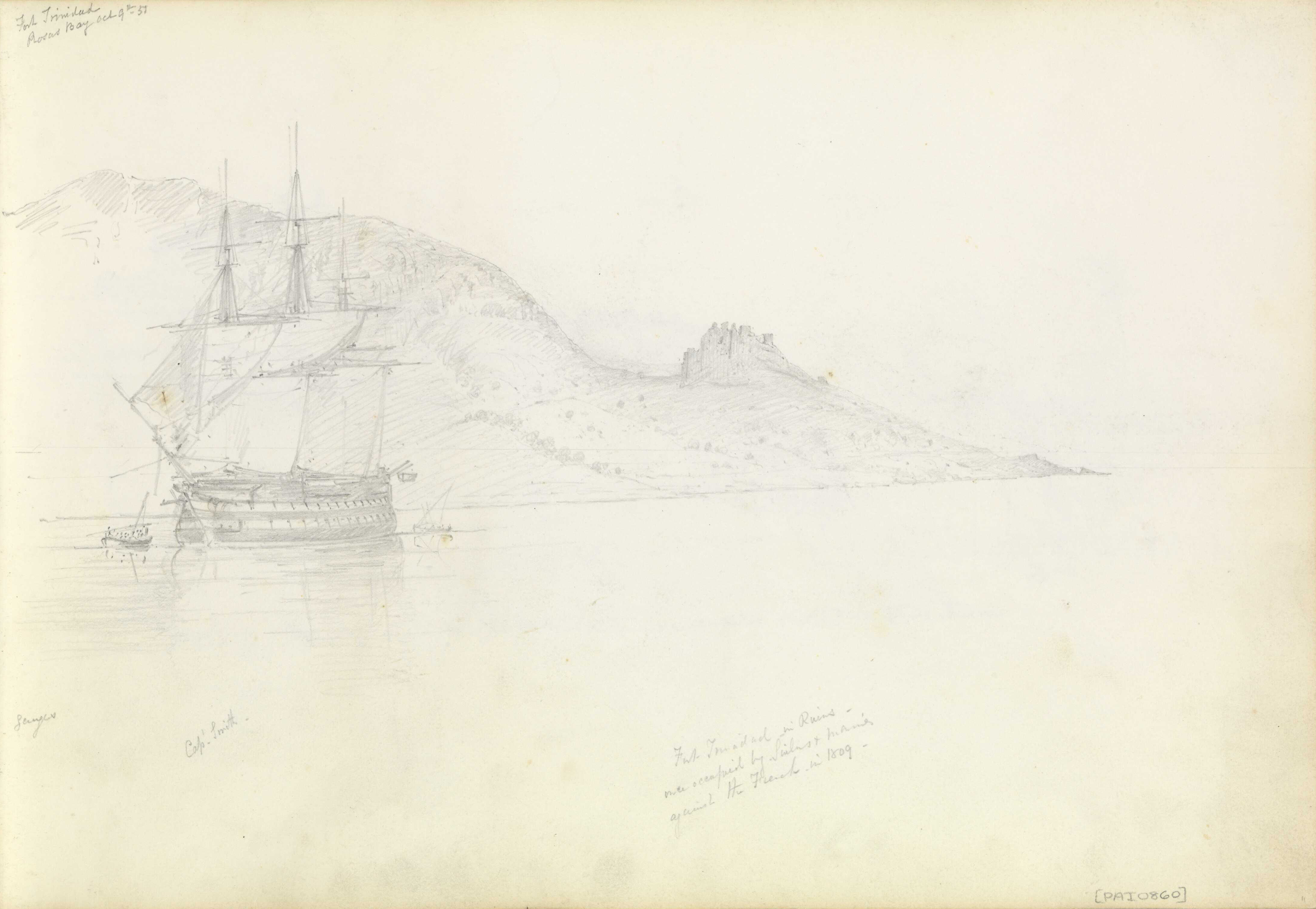
A study of HMS Ganges off Fort Trinidad, Rosas Bay, south-eastern Spain, 9 October 1851; his brother William had been a flag lieutenant on Ganges in the 1840s

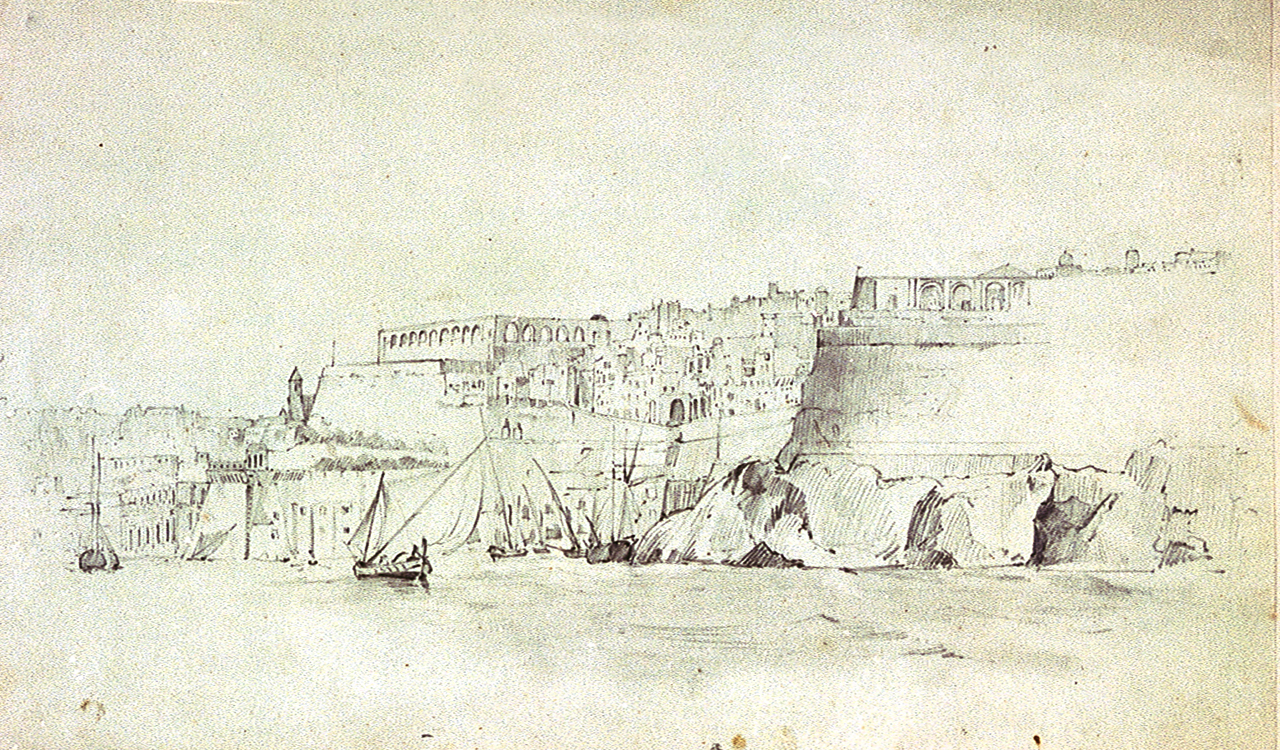
Valletta, Malta, sketch circa 1851

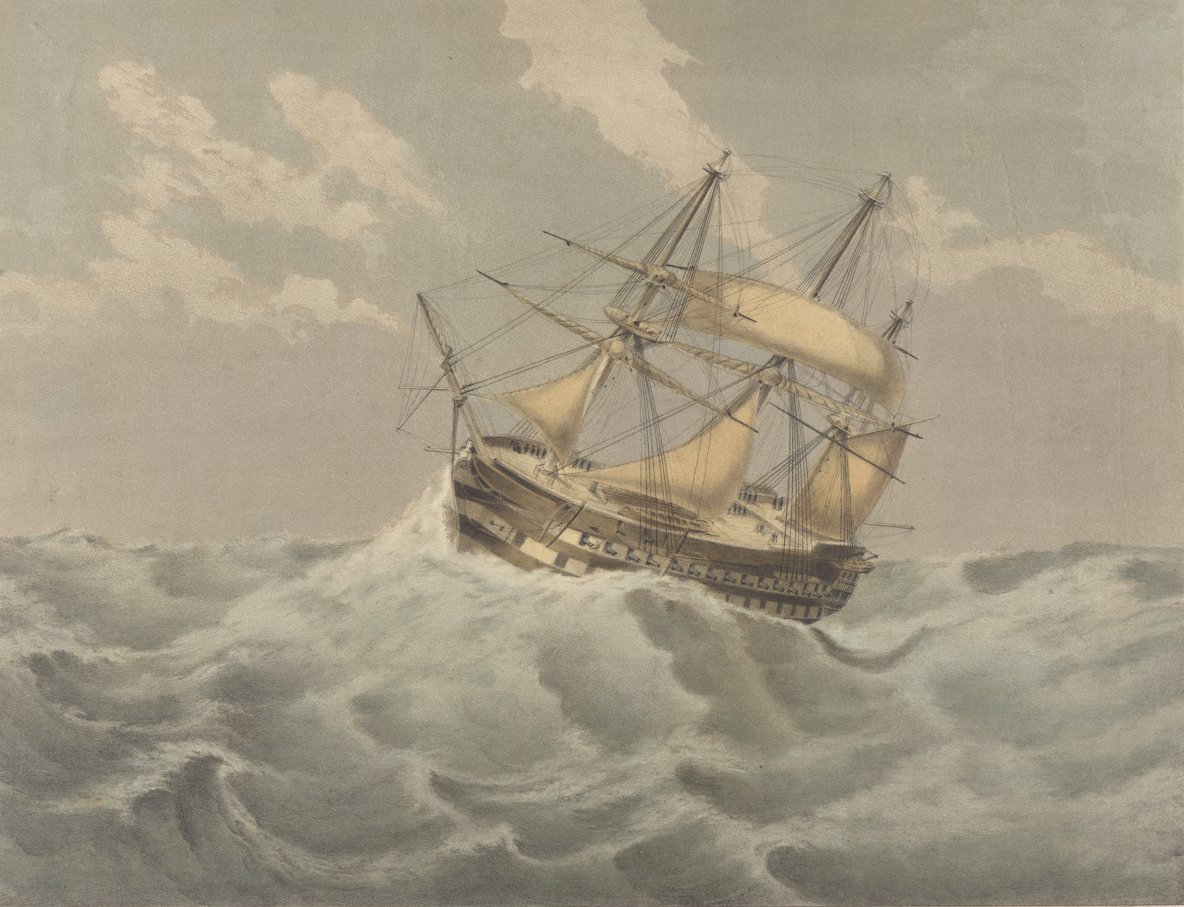
HMS Bellerophon, 50 Miles ESE of Malta, 1 February 1852; made a lithograph by Charles de Brocktorff

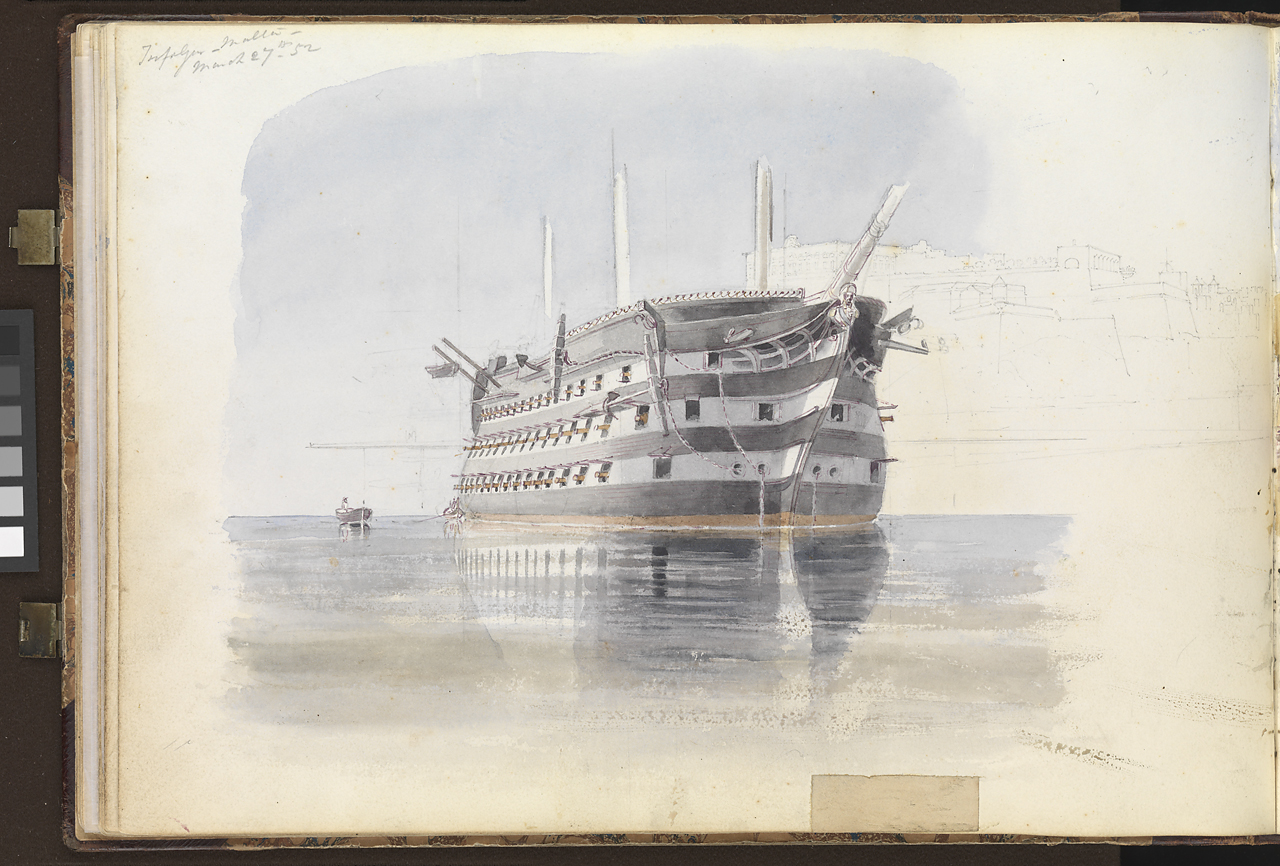
Mends made many drawings of HMS Trafalgar here is one, in his sketchbook, of her under the Upper Barracca, Malta, on 27 March 1852. She was there after losing her rudder at sea in February.

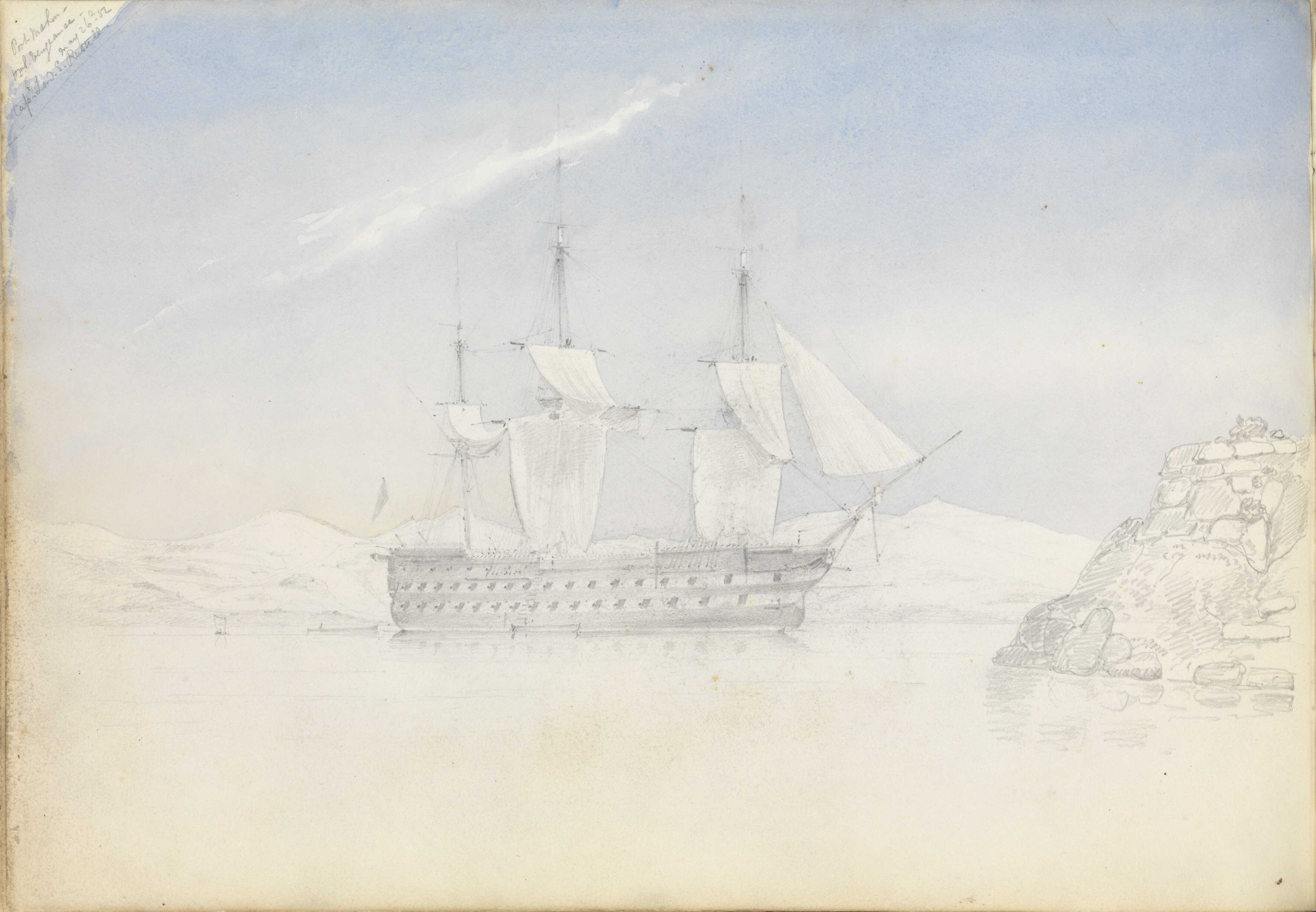
His brother William's ship HMS Vengeance in Port Mahon, 26 May 1852.

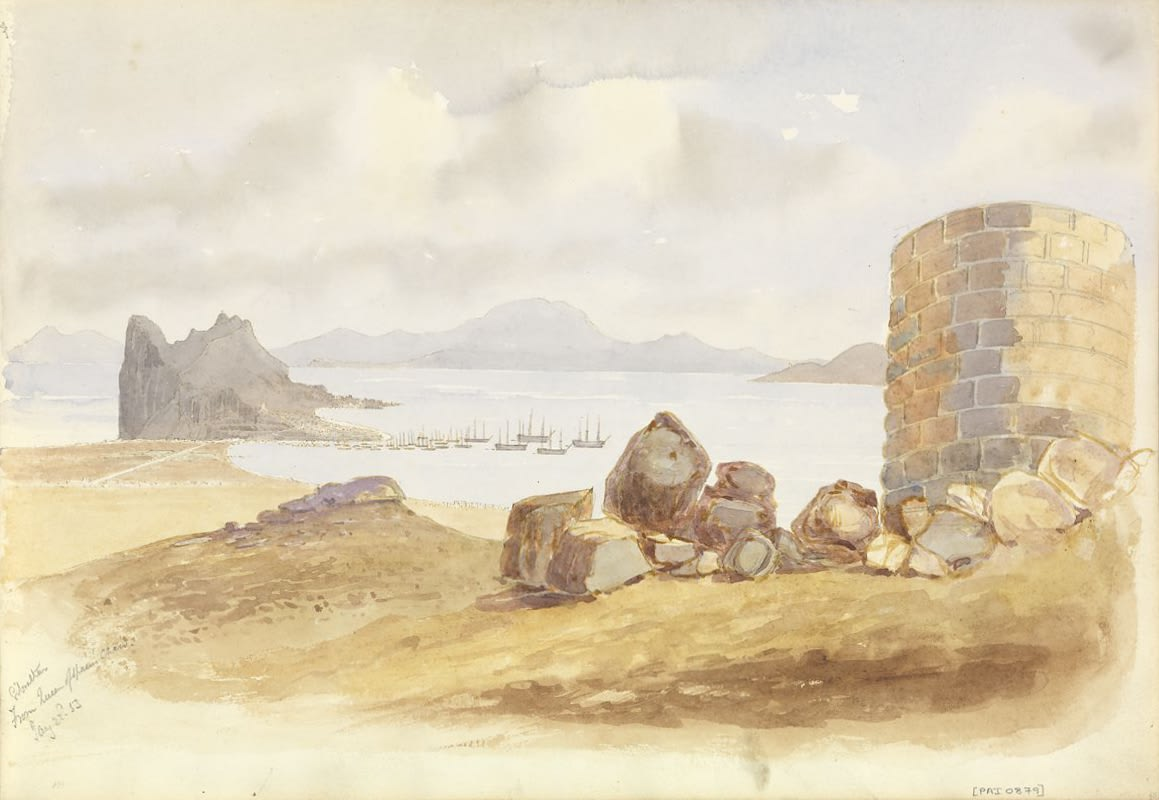
Gibraltar from the Queen of Spain's Chair, 22 January 1853.

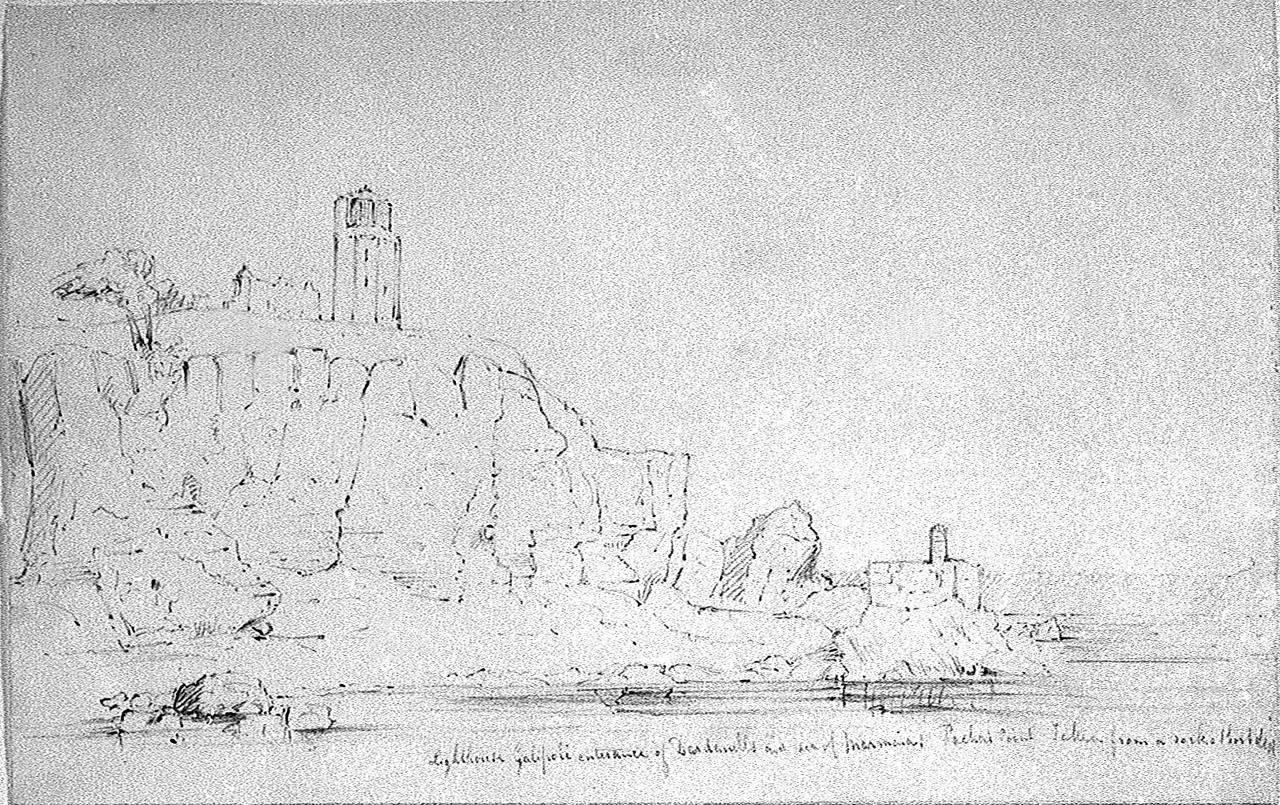
Lighthouse on Pasha's Point, Gallipoli, at the entrance of the Dardanelles and Sea of Marmara, July–October 1853

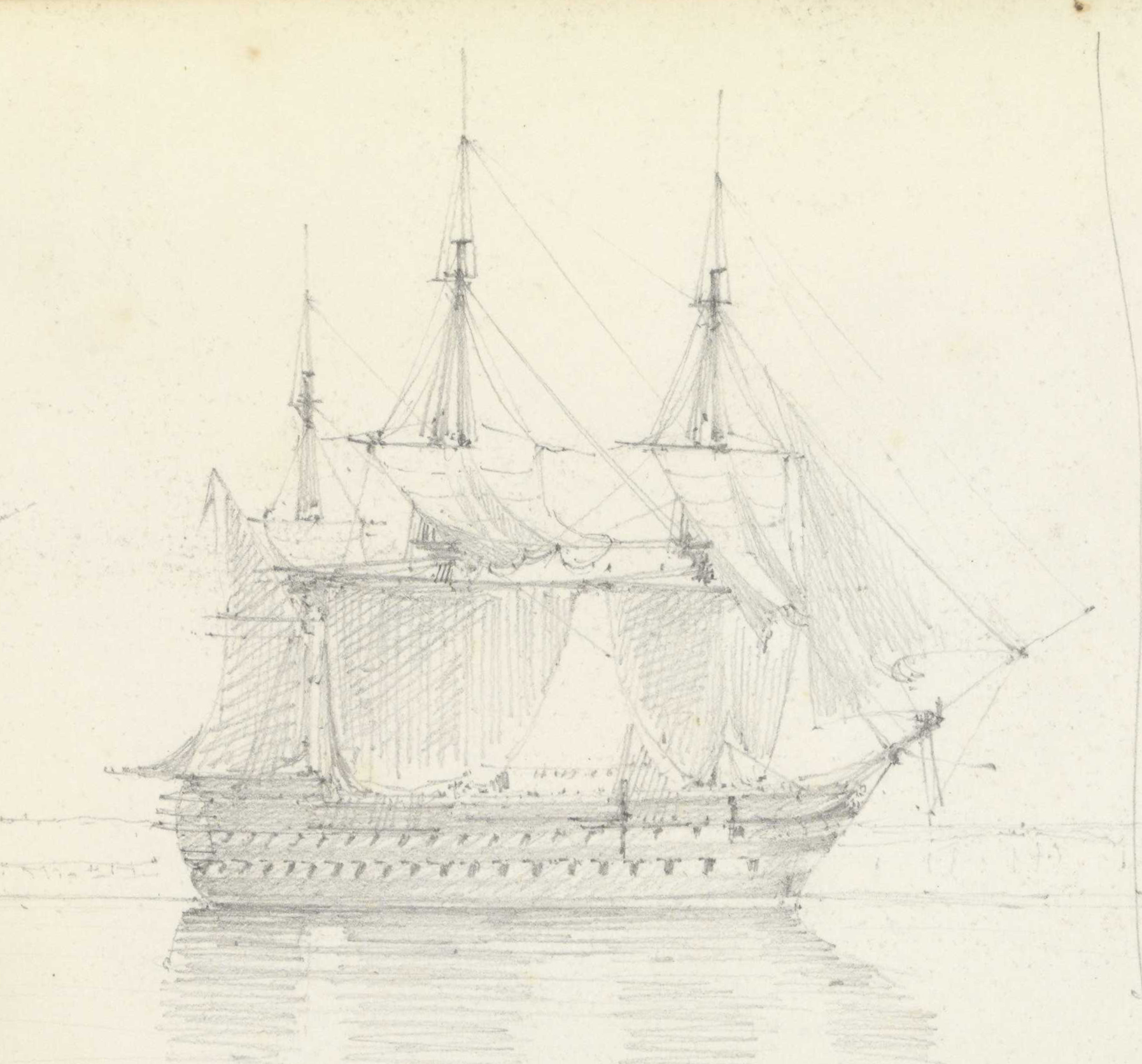
HMS Sans Pareil in Besika Bay, 3 October 1853

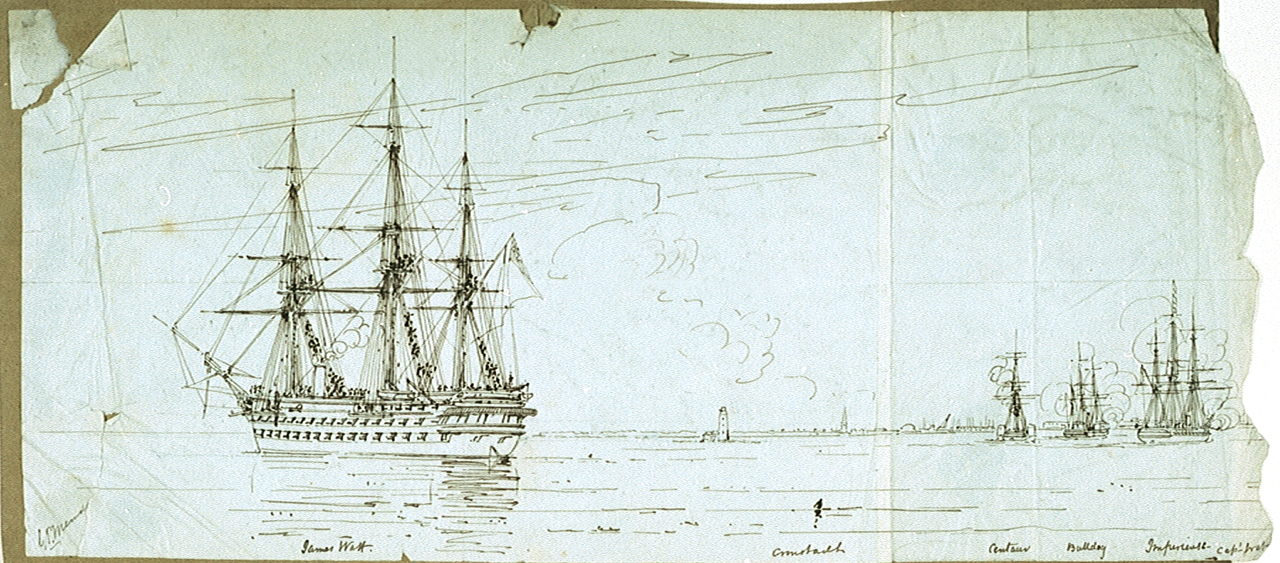
HMS James Watt and Mends were in action in the Baltic, here near the Tolboukin lighthouse, August 1855

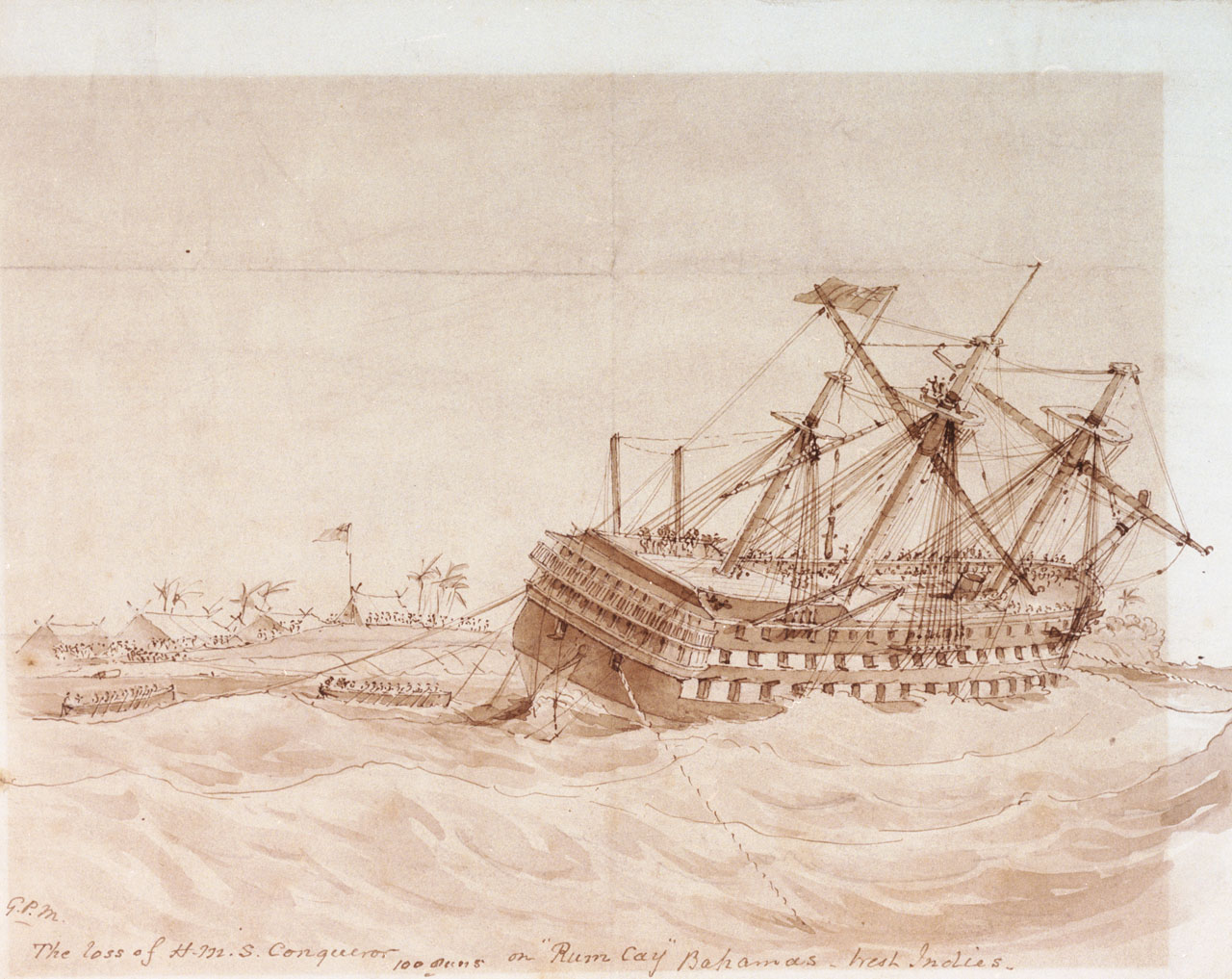
Mends was present, with HMS Edgar, as attempts were made in vain to salvage HMS Conqueror, on Rum Cay, in the Bahamas, January 1862

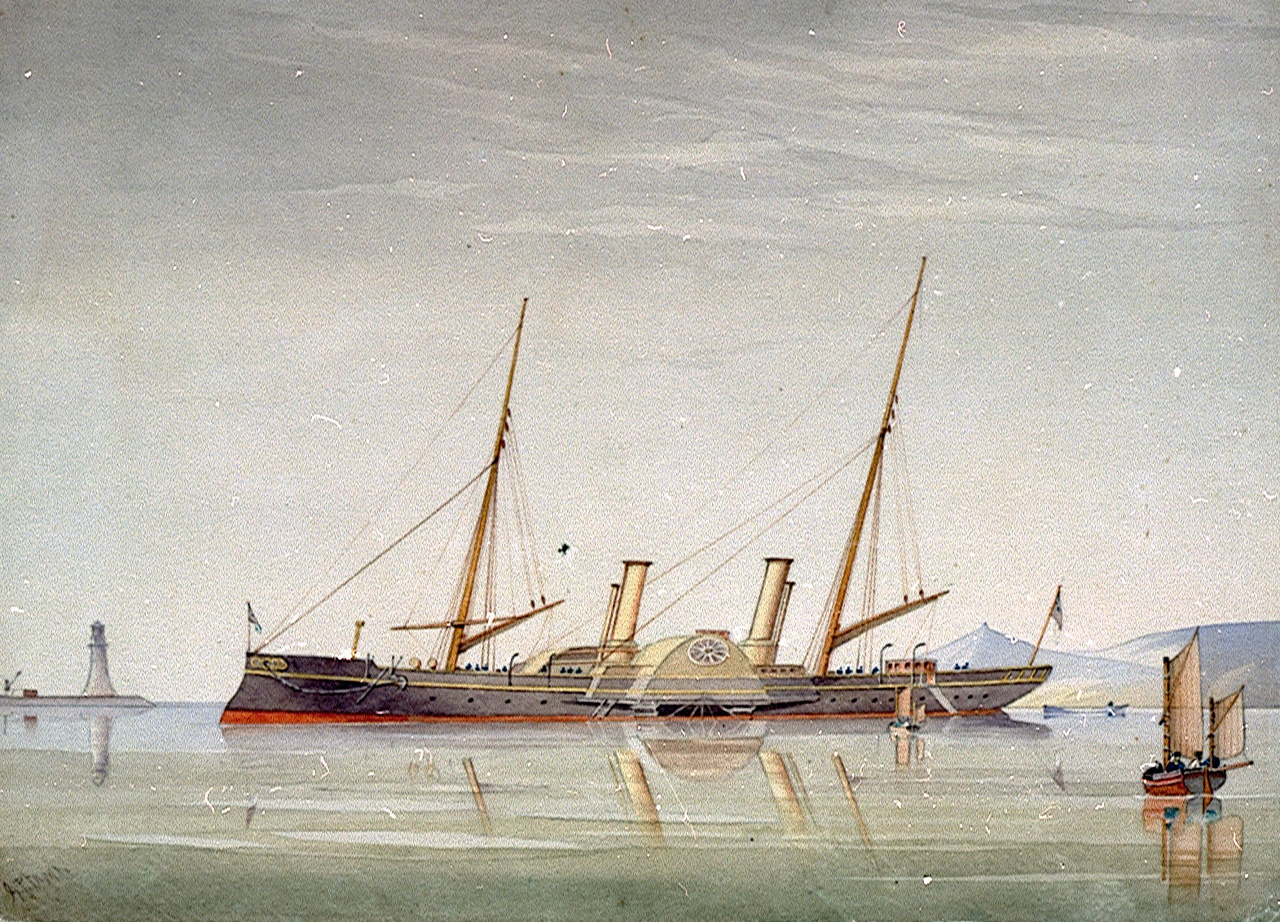
HMS Helicon, circa 1865

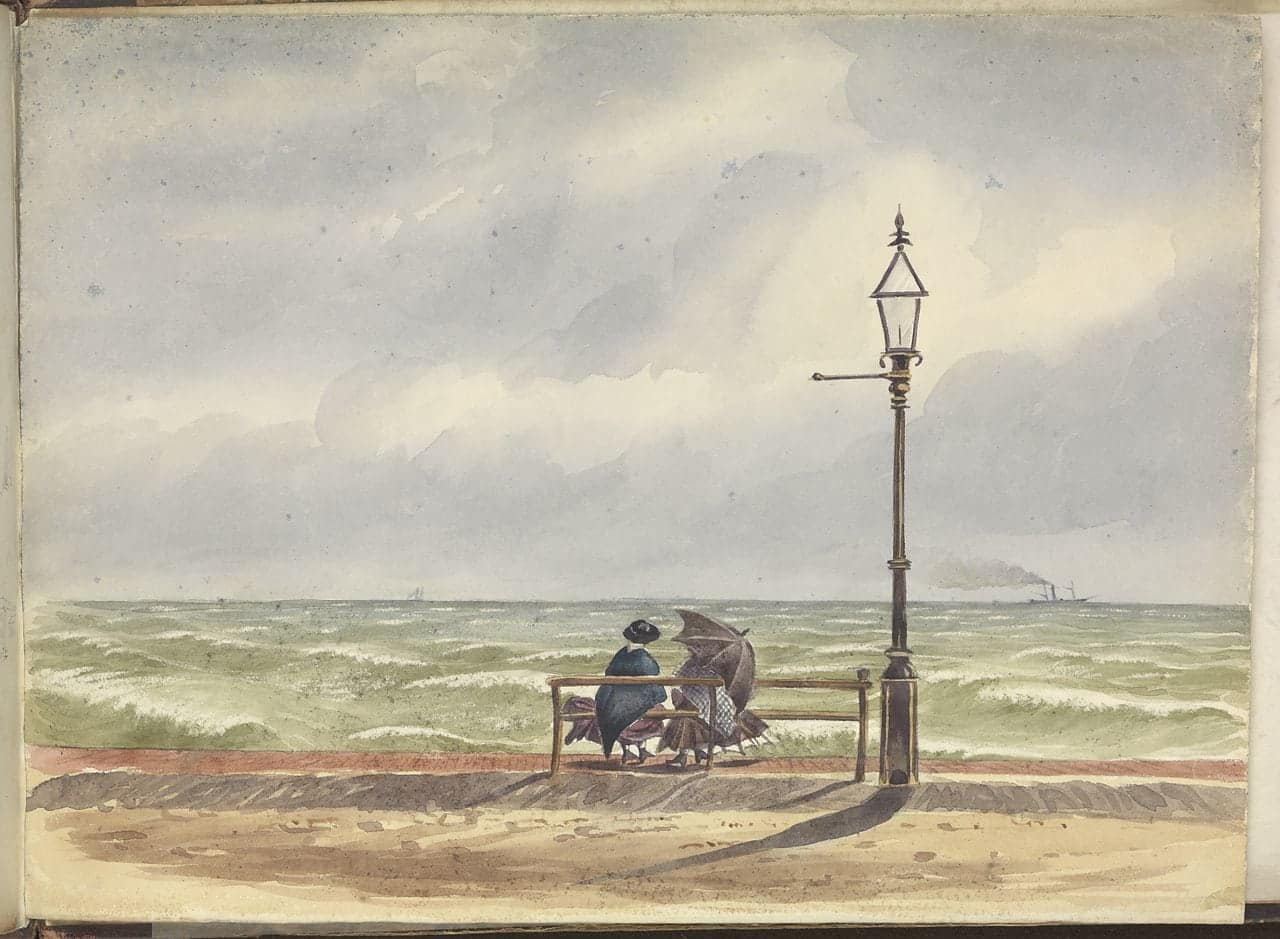
Mends was on half pay at the time of the sketch, and the two ladies looking out to sea are thought to be his wife and daughter
