= HMS Vengeance (1824) =

Ship of the line of the Royal Navy

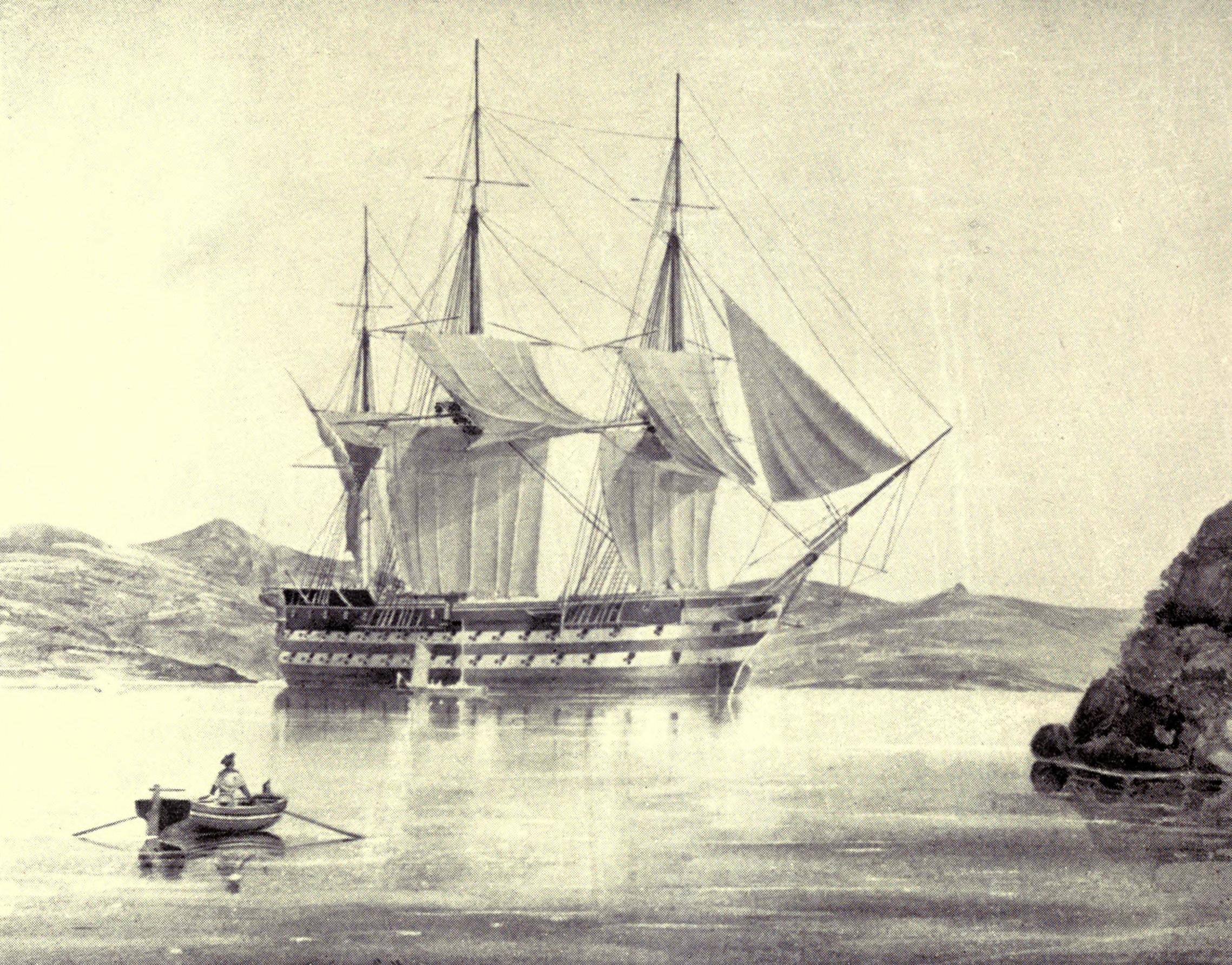
- A painting of HMS Vengeance in Mahón, 26 May 1852; after a study by George Pechell Mends, his brother William Robert Mends, served on her at the time.

History

United Kingdom
- Name: HMS Vengeance
- Ordered: 23 January 1817
- Builder: Pembroke Dockyard
- Laid down: July 1819
- Launched: 27 July 1824
- Fate: Sold, 1897

General characteristics
- Class & type: Canopus-class ship of the line
- Tons burthen: 2284 bm
- Length: 193 ft 10 in (59.08 m) (gundeck)
- Beam: 52 ft 4.5 in (15.964 m)
- Depth of hold: 22 ft 6 in (6.86 m)
- Propulsion: Sails
- Sail plan: Full-rigged ship
- Armament: 84 guns: Gundeck: 28 × 32 pdrs, 2 × 68 pdr carronades; Upper gundeck: 32 × 24 pdrs; Quarterdeck: 6 × 24 pdrs, 10 × 32 pdr carronades; Forecastle: 2 × 24 pdrs, 4 × 32 pdr carronades

HMS Vengeance was an 84-gun second rate ship of the line of the Royal Navy, launched on 27 July 1824 at Pembroke Dockyard. The Canopus-class ships were all modelled on a captured French ship, the Franklin, which was renamed HMS Canopus in British service. Some of the copies were faster than others, though it was reported that none could beat the original. HMS Vengeance was nicknamed 'the wind's-eye liner' and was faster than all the other ships except HMS Phaeton.

In 1849, while under the command of Captain Charles Philip Yorke, 4th Earl of Hardwicke, HMS Vengeance took part in the repression of the republican-inspired Revolt of Genoa in support of the forces of the Kingdom of Sardinia. A landing detachment from the ship occupied unopposed the main coastal defence battery in the harbour, but during the following bombardment of the town HMS Vengeance caused heavy and random damage, including the Hospital of Pammatone where it caused 107 civilian casualties. For these actions, Hardwicke was decorated by the Sardinian King Victor Emmanuel II with a Gold Medal of Military Valour, which he was authorized to accept by Queen Victoria only in 1855.

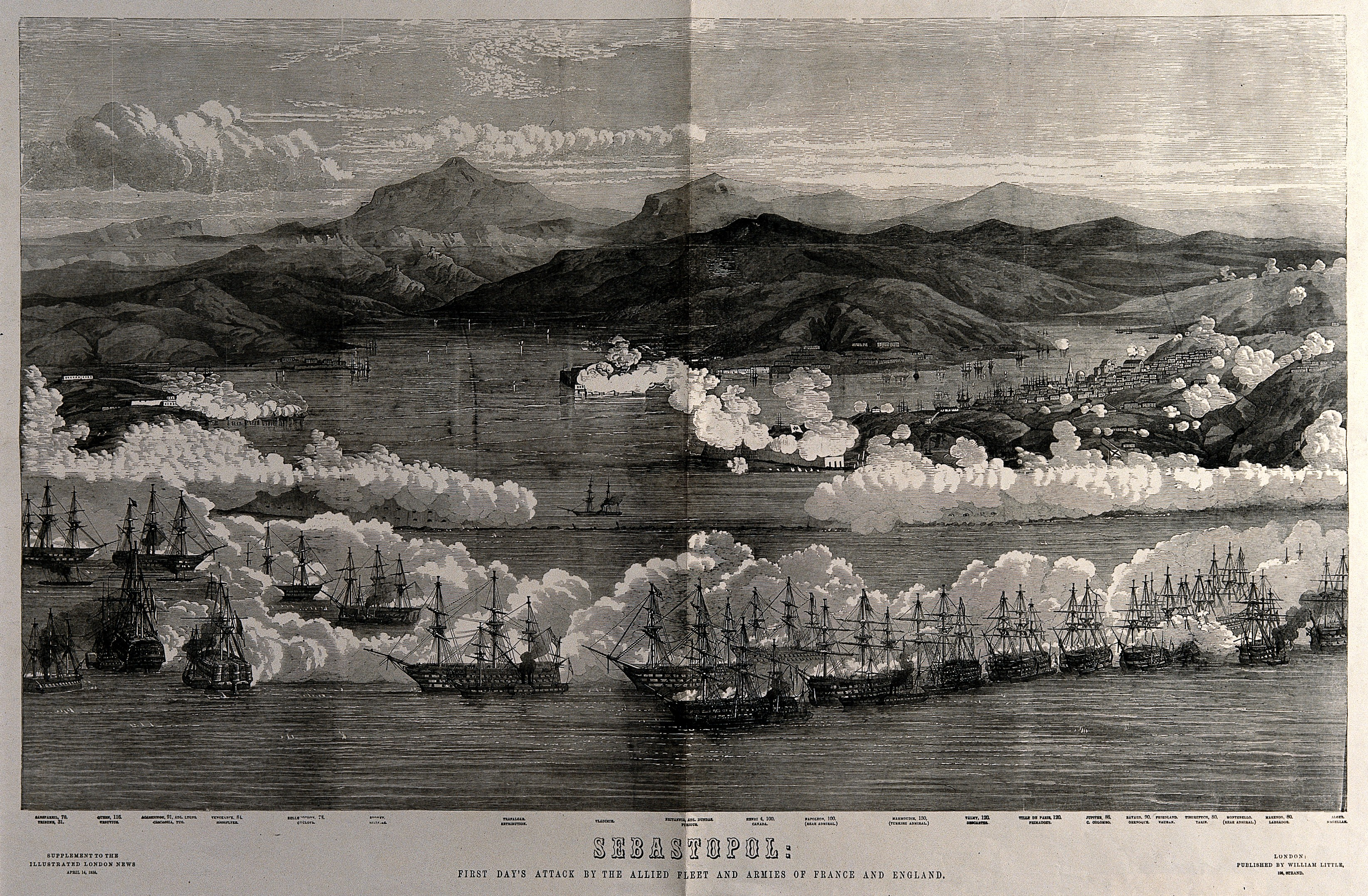
Vengeance at Sebastopol, during the first day's attack by the allied fleet and armies of France and England on 17 October 1854

Having returned to Britain, in August 1851 Vengeance, commanded by Captain Lord Edward Russell, left Portsmouth for the Mediterranean. After stops at Lisbon and Gibraltar, she arrived at Malta on 2 October. Vengeance's commander during 1851 and 1852 was William Robert Mends. On 13 March 1852, she ran aground in Gibraltar Bay and the end of a voyage from Malta to Gibraltar. She was refloated and found to be leaky. Vengeance returned to England at Christmas 1852, before returning to the Mediterranean with a new second in command, Commander George Le Geyt Bowyear, in the spring. By June she had rejoined the fleet at Malta, and then accompanied the whole Mediterranean fleet under Vice-Admiral James Dundas to Bashika Bay outside the Dardanelles as political tension increased before the Crimean War. In October the fleet moved through the Dardanelles to the Bosphorus and moored at Beikos Bay. In January she visited Sinope, where the Battle of Sinop had been fought the previous November between a Turkish squadron and the Russian fleet, resulting in a Turkish defeat. Vengeance moved to Varna in March, and then took part in the bombardment of Odessa on 22 April. The ship assisted with the transportation of the army across the Black Sea to the Crimea before attending at the Battle of Alma on 20 September.. She served in the bombardment of Sebastopol, 17 October 1854.

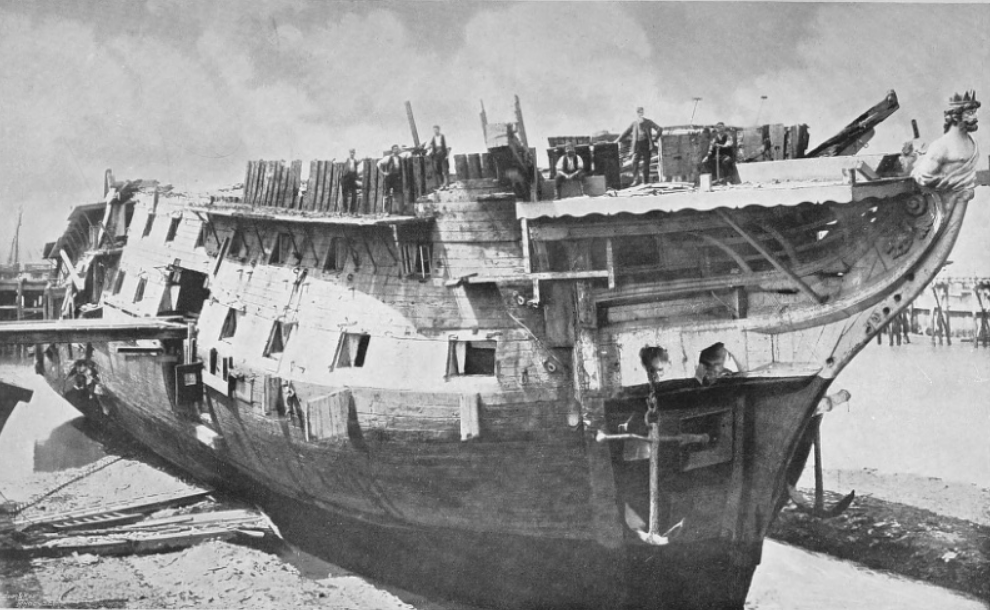
Vengeance c.1898, having broken in two when moved out of her berth at Devonport

She became a receiving ship in 1861, and was eventually sold out of the navy in 1897.
