= George Le Geyt Bowyear =

Royal Navy Officer (1818–1903)

Vice Admiral George Le Geyt Bowyear CB
- Born: 1818; Dilwyn, Herefordshire
- Died: 14 February 1903 (aged 84–85); St Helier, Jersey
- Military career
- Allegiance: United Kingdom
- Branch: Royal Navy
- Service years: 1830–1870
- Rank: Vice Admiral
- Commands: HMS Vulcan; HMS Sans Pareil; HMS Phaeton; RN Dockyard, Bermuda
- Conflicts: Crimean War
- Awards: Companion of the Order of the Bath

Vice Admiral George Le Geyt Bowyear CB (1818 – 14 February 1903) was a senior Royal Navy officer who went on to be Captain in charge of the Royal Naval Dockyard, Bermuda.

== Naval career ==
Bowyear was born at Dilwyn, Herefordshire in 1818, the son of Thomas Kyerwood Bowyear. He entered the Royal Navy as a cadet on 2 December 1830, passed his examination in 1836, and was promoted to lieutenant on 19 April 1840. After serving in HMS Andromeda and HMS Racehorse, he was employed on the North America and West India station, then from 1843 in the East Indies. From 1847 he was First-Lieutenant to Captain Henry Keppel on HMS Maeander, serving several eventful years on the China station, where they were deployed in operations against Borneo pirates.

After his return to the United Kingdom in the autumn of 1851, Bowyear was promoted to commander, and from January 1853 served as second in command on the battleship HMS Vengeance in the Mediterranean Fleet. By June that year Vengeance had rejoined the fleet at Malta and then accompanied the whole Mediterranean Fleet under Vice Admiral James Dundas to Bashika Bay outside the Dardanelles as political tension increased before the Crimean War. In October 1853 the fleet moved through the Dardanelles to the Bosphorus and moored at Beikos Bay. In early 1854 Vengeance visited Sinope and Varna, and then took part in the bombardment of Odessa on 22 April. The ship assisted with the transportation of the army across the Black Sea to the Crimea before attending at the Battle of Alma on 20 September 1854. During the later part of the Crimean war, Bowyear commanded HMS Vulcan, and for his service he was promoted to captain on 10 May 1856. He also received the French Legion d'honeur (Knight) and the Ottoman Order of the Medjidie (5th class).

As a captain he commanded HMS Sans Pareil transporting troops to the China station and from August 1863 to March 1865 HMS Phaeton on the North America and West Indies Station. After holding several home appointments, he was in August 1869 appointed Captain in charge of the Dockyard in the Imperial fortress colony of Bermuda but retired after only a year in September 1870.

Bowyear was appointed a Companion of the Order of the Bath (CB) in the 1869 Birthday Honours. He was promoted to rear admiral on the Retired List on 18 June 1874, and later vice admiral on the Retired List.

Bowyear was unmarried, and lived in St Helier, Jersey, where he died on 14 February 1903.

== See also ==
- O'Byrne, William Richard (1849). "Bowyear, George Le Geyt" . A Naval Biographical Dictionary . John Murray – via Wikisource.
