= HMS Sans Pareil (1851) =

Ship of the line of the Royal Navy

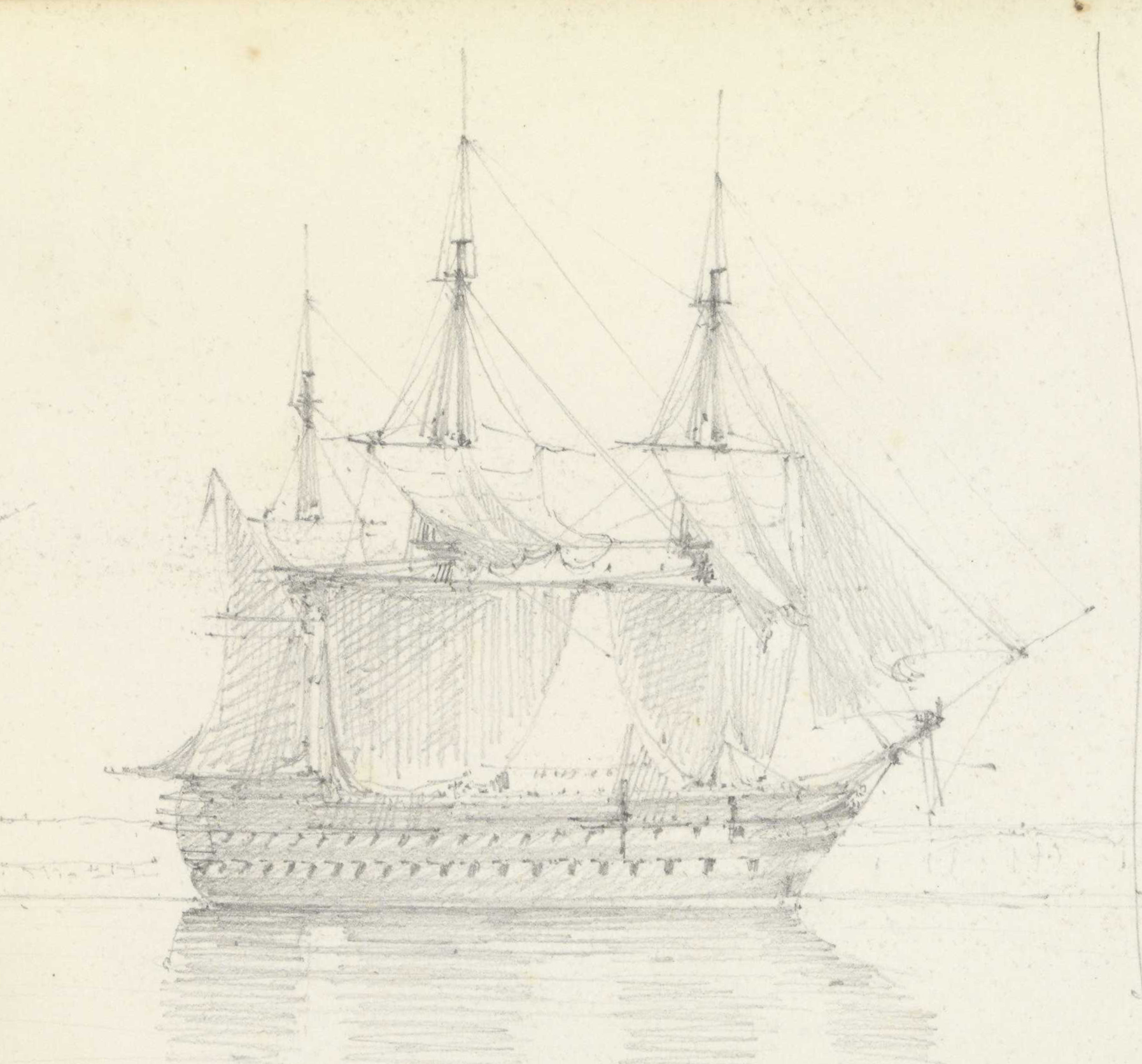
- Sans Pareil in Besika Bay, 3 October 1853

History

United Kingdom
- Name: Sans Pareil
- Namesake: French for peerless
- Ordered: 27 February 1843 (as 80-gun second rate); 18 May 1849 (as 70-gun screw-propelled third rate)
- Builder: Devonport Dockyard
- Laid down: 1 September 1845
- Launched: 18 March 1851
- Commissioned: 12 November 1852
- Fate: Sold for scrap, March 1867

General characteristics (as completed)
- Type: 70-gun, third-rate ship of the line
- Displacement: 3,800 long tons (3,900 t)
- Tons burthen: 2,338 80/94 bm
- Length: 200 ft (61 m) (o/a)
- Beam: 52 ft 3 in (15.9 m)
- Draught: 24 ft 6 in (7.5 m)
- Depth of hold: 22 ft 8 in (6.9 m)
- Installed power: 622 ihp (464 kW)
- Propulsion: 1 screw; 1 single-expansion steam engine
- Sail plan: Full-rigged ship
- Speed: 7.1 knots (13.1 km/h; 8.2 mph) (trials)
- Complement: 626
- Armament: 70 muzzle-loading, smoothbore guns: Lower deck: 30 × 32 pdr guns; Upper deck: 24 × 32 pdr guns + 6 × 8 in (203 mm) shell guns; Quarter deck & Forecastle: 10 × 32 pdr guns

HMS Sans Pareil was a 70-gun, screw-propelled, third-rate ship of the line built for the Royal Navy (RN) during the 1850s. Completed in 1852, she was the first ship of her type to be completed for the RN. The ship played a minor role in the Crimean War of 1854–1856, participating in the bombardment of Sevastopol in 1854. Sans Pareil spent most of the next year having her unreliable engine replaced. She was present during the Indian Mutiny of 1857 and the Second Opium War of 1856–1860, but saw no action, although her crew often formed landing parties for service ashore. In 1859 the ship became a flagship when she served as the guardship for southern Ireland. Sans Pareil served as a troopship in 1861–1862 before she was paid off the following year. The ship was sold for scrap in 1867.

== Background and description ==
Sans Pareil was initially designed as a copy of the earlier 84-gun, second rate Sans Pareil (peerless), a French prize captured in 1794. Implicitly insulting the Surveyor of the Navy, William Symonds' ability to design a ship of her size, the First Lord of the Admiralty, Earl Haddington, and the First Naval Lord, Admiral George Cockburn, decided to have a ship built to a 40-year-old, foreign design that was not judged good enough to be copied any time previously. This was the result of a feud between Haddington and Cochrane, both Tories with Symonds, a Whig. In addition to party factionalism, the conflict was rooted in serious disagreements over his ship designs, which were radically different to previous practice. Other factors included Symonds' increasing opposition to steam propulsion as he aged, his preference for sailing qualities over fighting efficiency, his acerbic personality and his inability to accept criticism as anything other than a personal attack.

Sans Pareil was ordered on 27 February 1843 and the Admiralty ordered that Symonds modify the design to use the gunports and other features used by the 80-gun ships currently building on 22 April. His design was approved on 25 May and the ship was laid down on 1 September 1845 at Devonport Dockyard. Not long after Captain Sir Baldwin Wake Walker was appointed Surveyor on 5 February 1848, work on her was suspended on 2 October.

The ship was intended to measure 193 feet (58.8 m) at the gun deck and 158 feet 11 inches (48.4 m) at the keel. Sans Pareil would have had a beam of 52 feet 1 inch (15.9 m), a depth of hold of 22 feet 8 inches (6.9 m) and had a tonnage of 2,242 50/94 tons burthen. Her crew would have numbered 750 officers and ratings. The ship had the usual three-masted full-ship rig. Her muzzle-loading, smoothbore armament was intended to consist of twenty 32-pounder (56 cwt) guns (Note: "Cwt" is the abbreviation for hundredweight, 56 cwt referring to the weight of the gun.) and eight 8-inch (203 mm) (65 cwt) shell guns on the lower gun deck and twenty-four 50 cwt, 32-pounder guns and four 8-inch (50 cwt) shell guns on the upper gun deck. Between her forecastle and quarterdeck, she would have carried twenty-four 32-pounder (41 cwt) guns.

=== Conversion ===
Sans Pareil was authorized to be converted into a steam-powered ship of the line on 15 November 1848 using the 350-nominal horsepower, single-expansion steam engine intended for the conversion of the frigate Eurotas. A preliminary drawing and model were approved on 14 December that lengthened the ship by seven feet (2.1 m) at the stern to accommodate the engine and boilers, although the ship was not formally re-ordered until 18 May 1849.

The ship measured 200 feet (61 m) on the gun deck and 165 feet 3 inches (50.4 m) on the keel. She had a beam of 52 feet 3 inches (15.9 m), the same depth of hold, a deep draught of 25 feet 8 inches (7.82 m) and had a tonnage of 2,338 80/94 tons burthen. Rather than the engine from Eurotas, the ship was fitted with the four-cylinder, single-expansion steam engine built by Boulton & Watt of the same nominal horsepower from the frigate Horatio. Driving a single propeller shaft, Sans Pareil's boilers provided enough steam to give the engine 622 indicated horsepower (464 kW) that was good for a speed of 7.1 knots (13.1 km/h; 8.2 mph) during her sea trials. The ship retained the masts and rigging of her initial design. Her crew numbered 626 officers and ratings.

The excessive weight of the machinery had to be offset by reducing the planned 80-gun armament to 70 by deleting ten 32-pounder (25 cwt) guns from the quarterdeck. A further reduction in weight was made by exchanging twenty-four 8-inch (52 cwt) shell guns for 32-pounder (45 cwt) guns on the upper deck. Sans Pareil's armament consisted of thirty 32-pounder (56 cwt) guns on the lower gun deck, six 8-inch (52 cwt) guns and the 32-pounder (45 cwt) guns already mentioned on the upper gun deck; while two 32-pounders (56 cwt) and eight 32-pounders (25 cwt) were located on the forecastle and quarterdeck, respectively.

== Construction and career ==
Sans Pareil was the second ship of her name to serve in the Royal Navy. She was launched on 18 March 1851, commissioned on 12 November 1852 by Captain Sydney Dacres and completed on 12 November 1852. She was initially based at Lisbon, but by 1853 was serving with the Channel Fleet. She was reassigned to the Mediterranean before the end of the year.

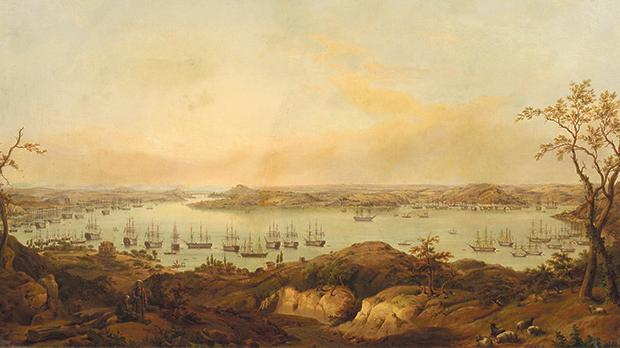
Britannia and the Allied Fleets anchored in the Bosphorus, late 1853; the prelude to the Crimean War. Giuseppe Schranz

The decisive Russian victory in the Battle of Sinop over the Ottoman Navy on 30 November 1853 alarmed politicians in both Britain and France. They decided to intervene on the side of the Ottomans and both countries ordered ships from their Mediterranean Fleets into the Bosphorus on 24 December and then into the Black Sea on 3 January 1854.

Sans Pareil was present during the bombardment of Odessa (modern Odesa) on 22 April, but did not actually participate in the bombardment. The fleets then sailed to Sevastopol where the ship participated in the naval bombardment of the city on 17 October. She was the second-closest ship to the Russian forts at a range of about 800 yards (730 m). The British ships were generally too far away to have much of an effect on the forts; the same was not true for the forts. Sans Pareil's masts and rigging were badly damaged; her crew suffered the second-heaviest casualties of any British ship with 11 dead and 59 wounded.

During the Great Storm of 1854 on 14 November she was driven ashore at Balaklava, Russia. Not long afterwards, Dacres took sick and was replaced by Acting Captain Leopold Heath on 22 November. Sans Pareil arrived in Malta on 23 February 1855. Heath was replaced by Captain Woodford Williams around that time and the ship continued for home for repairs and to have her unreliable engine replaced by a two-cylinder engine rated at 400 nhp that was built by James Watt & Co. During her sea trials off Plymouth on 12 August, the ship reached 9.3 knots (17.2 km/h; 10.7 mph) from 1,471 ihp (1,097 kW). The following month Sans Pareil was used to transport mortars to the Baltic, but she did not arrive before the end of the campaign season. Upon her return home the ship was paid off.

Sans Pareil was recommissioned by Captain Astley Cooper Key on 22 January 1856, and who was placed in charge of a division of gunboats in the Baltic. She was used to return troops from the Crimea in May and then visited Portugal in September. Sans Pareil ferried 300 Royal Marines to China in March 1857 and then took artillery and stores from China to Calcutta in August during the Indian Mutiny. Some of her crewmen garrisoned Fort William in that city for a time, but the ship arrived back at China on 17 December. Sans Pareil participated in the Second Opium War, with Key commanding part of the naval brigade at the capture of Canton on 28 December 1857. Key was invalided back to Britain in April 1858, and was replaced by Captain Julian Foulston Slight. He was in turn replaced by Captain Rochfort Maguire on 30 June for the return trip to Britain. The ship was paid off on 15 February 1859.

Sans Pareil was recommissioned on 31 December by Captain Arthur Eardley-Wilmot to replace HMS Nile as the flagship of Rear-Admiral Charles Talbot and as the Queenstown (now Cobh, Ireland), guardship. In November 1861 she was used to transport troops to Veracruze, Mexico, along with HMS Donegal and HMS Conqueror. Captain George Le Geyt Bowyear relieved Eardley-Wilmot on 7 June 1862, and the ship spent the next year conveying marines to China, and returning invalids home. She was paid off on 11 June 1863. Sans Pareil was reduced to 66 guns in 1866 and was sold to C. Marshall for scrap on 8 March 1867.
