= George Elliot (Royal Navy officer, born 1813) =

Royal Navy Admiral and politician (1813–1901)

Admiral Sir George Elliot KCB
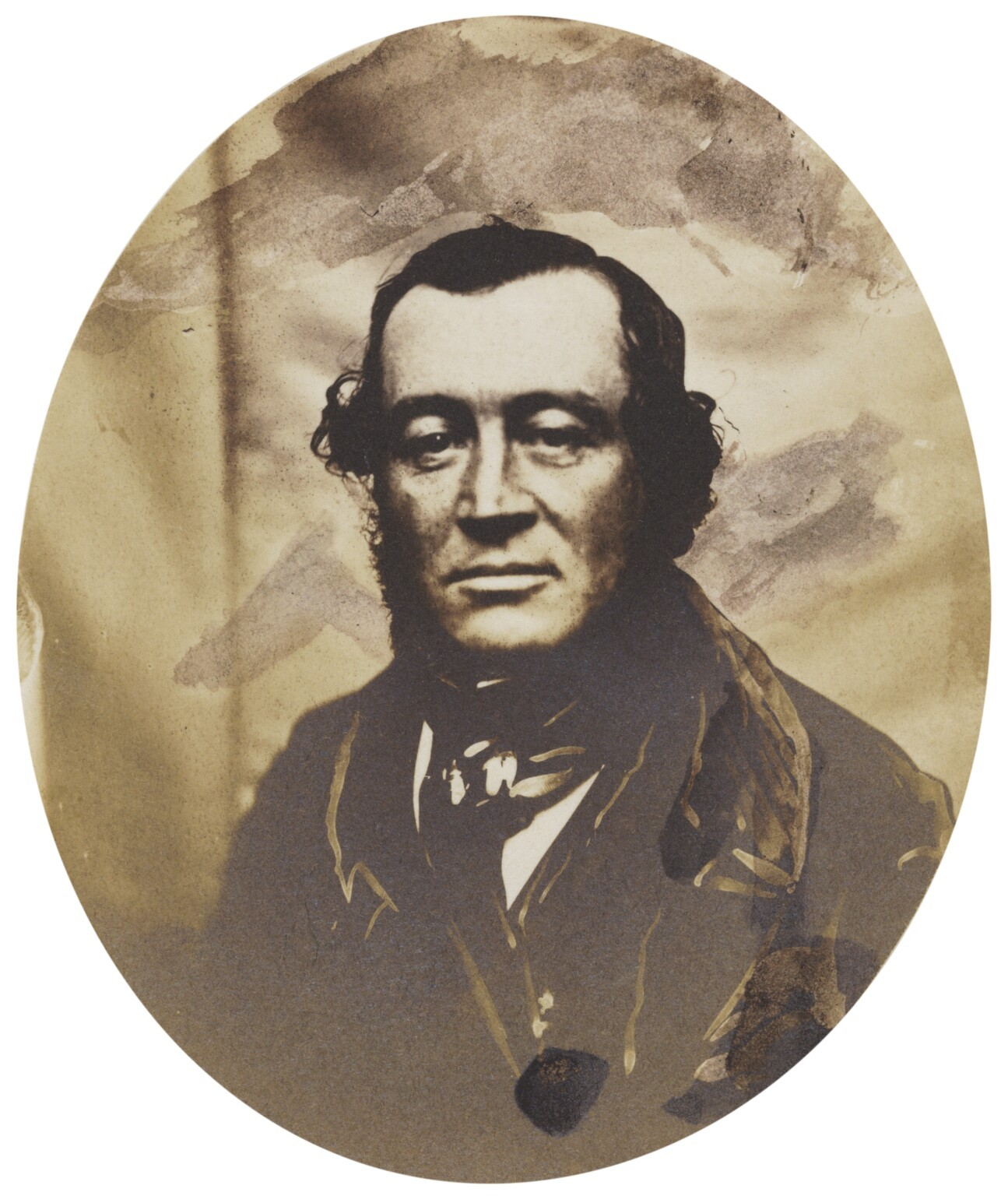
- Salt print of Elliot, late 1840s
- Born: 25 September 1813; Calcutta, India
- Died: 13 December 1901 (aged 88); London, United Kingdom
- Spouse: Hersey Susan Sidney Wauchope
- Relatives: George Elliot (father)
- Military career
- Allegiance: United Kingdom
- Branch: Royal Navy
- Service years: 1827–1878
- Rank: Admiral
- Commands: Columbine; HMS Volage; HMS Eurydice; HMS Phaeton; HMS James Watt; Portsmouth Command
- Awards: Knight Commander of the Order of the Bath

Admiral Sir George Augustus Elliot KCB (25 September 1813 – 13 December 1901) was a British Royal Navy flag officer and politician.

== Naval career ==
He was born in Calcutta, the son of Admiral Sir George Elliot. He entered the navy in November 1827, and was made lieutenant on 12 November 1834. Until 1837 he served aboard HMS Astraea along with Lord Edward Russell, also later to become a Member of Parliament. On 15 January 1838 he was made captain of the brig Columbine at the Cape and South Africa stations, under the direct command of his father, capturing six slavers in the two years he served in this position. In February 1840 he went to China with his father, and on 3 June was given command of HMS Volage after the death of its previous captain, returning to England in 1841 with his invalided father on board as a passenger.

From 1843 to 1846 Elliot commanded the frigate HMS Eurydice, designed by his father, on the North American station, and in December 1849 he was appointed to the frigate HMS Phaeton. She was removed from active duty in 1853, and in January 1854 Elliot commissioned HMS James Watt, one of the first screw battleships, which he commanded in the Baltic campaigns of 1854 and 1855, despite the poor performance of the ship, and the dissatisfaction of Vice-Admiral Charles Napier. On 24 February 1858 Elliot became rear-admiral, and was then captain of the fleet to Sir Charles Fremantle, commanding the Channel Fleet.

Between 1859 and 1860 he was a member of the Royal Commission on the Defence of the United Kingdom and signed a report which concluded that the Royal Navy would be unable to defend the British Isles in the event of an invasion. In 1861 he was a candidate for the post of Controller of the Navy, which was given to Robert Spencer Robinson. Between 1863 and 1865 he was superintendent of HMNB Portsmouth. On 12 September 1865 he became vice-admiral, and then was repeatedly on royal commissions on naval issues. In a dissenting report appended to the 1871 committee on designs, Elliot and Alfred Ryder, who believed that the ram was the primary weapon of naval combat, pressed for increased freeboard, the retention of sailing rig, and the concentration of armour. The direct result of this report was the construction of the battleship HMS Temeraire.

In 1870 Elliot reached the rank of admiral, and in 1874 he was elected Conservative MP for Chatham; but he resigned his seat in 1875, on being appointed Commander-in-Chief, Portsmouth. On 2 June 1877 he was nominated a KCB, and the following year, on 26 September, he was placed on the retired list. He continued to occupy himself with the study of naval questions after retirement, and published in 1885 A Treatise on Future Naval Battles and how to Fight them. He was an active member of the Royal United Services Institute

He died in London on 13 December 1901, after a brief illness.

== Family ==
On 1 August 1842 he married Hersey Susan Sidney Wauchope, daughter of Colonel Wauchope, with whom he had several children. Their daughter Elizabeth Georgina Frances Elliot married George Carnegie, 9th Earl of Northesk, while another daughter, Nina Helen, married Sir Thomas Butler.

== Cricket ==
Elliot is recorded as having played cricket for Cambridge University Cricket Club in two matches in 1831. However, at that time he was already in the Navy, and Alumni Cantabrigienses has no record of his having attended the University.

== See also ==
- This article incorporates text from a publication now in the public domain: Lee, Sidney, ed. (1912). "Elliot, George Augustus". Dictionary of National Biography (2nd supplement). London: Smith, Elder & Co.
- O'Byrne, William Richard (1849). "Elliot, George (b)" . A Naval Biographical Dictionary . John Murray – via Wikisource.

Parliament of the United Kingdom
Preceded by Arthur Otway	Member of Parliament for Chatham; 1874–1875	Succeeded by John Eldon Gorst
Military offices
Preceded by Sir Rodney Mundy	Commander-in-Chief, Portsmouth; 1875–1878	Succeeded by Sir Edward Fanshawe
