= HMS Vulcan (1849) =

History

United Kingdom
- Name: HMS Vulcan
- Namesake: Vulcan
- Ordered: 4 March 1845
- Builder: Ditchburn & Mare/C. J. Mare & Co., Blackwall, London
- Laid down: 12 March 1846
- Launched: 27 January 1849
- In service: 3 March 1851
- Fate: Sold, 1867

General characteristics
- Type: Transport / troopship
- Displacement: 2,396 tons
- Tons burthen: 1,747 tons bm
- Length: 220 ft 8 in (67.26 m) (overall); 195 ft 4 in (59.54 m) (keel)
- Beam: 26 ft 10 in (8.18 m)
- Draught: 14 ft (4.3 m)
- Propulsion: 350 hp (260 kW) steam engine, single screw
- Armament: 14 guns

HMS Vulcan was an intended iron-hulled screw frigate of the British Royal Navy, ordered from Ditchburn & Mare, Blackwall, London on 4 March 1845, to the shipbuilder's design, and had her keel laid on 12 March 1846. Measuring 1,747 tons burthen she had 14 gunports, was fitted with fore, main and mizzen masts, a funnel, a stump bowsprit, and a figurehead depicting a male figure holding a hammer. Following a trial on a target representing the side of the ship, it was decided that iron vessels were unsuitable for war purposes and, on 23 April 1847, Vulcan was ordered to be completed as a transport, with capacity for 677 troops (later that year, Thomas Ditchburn retired from the partnership and construction was continued by C. J. Mare & Co.). She was launched on 27 January 1849, and eventually completed on 3 March 1851. Vulcan was sold in 1867 as the barque Jorawur.

== Ship history ==
From 1852 until 1855 she was under the command of Edward Pelham Brenton von Donop.

Edward Sholto Douglas, R.N., son of the late Major Sholto Douglas, and nephew of the Marchioness of Queensberry, master of HMS Winchester, from which ship he was invalided at Rangoon, was lost from HMS Vulcan off Ascension Island on 27 February 1853. His body was recovered and he was buried on the island.

Times Newspaper for Tuesday 17th Jan 1854 carried the following report about H.M.S Vulcan's arrival at Gravesend. "The Vulcan iron screw steam troopship, Commander Edward P.B Von Dunlop, arrived off Gravesend on Saturday afternoon, and cast anchor there for the purpose of landing 24 soldiers, 18 women, and 86 orphan children, brought home from Bermuda and other islands in the West Indies, the orphans being the sons and daughters of soldiers who had died of the late prevalent fever. The soldiers, women, and children were sent by the North Kent Railway to Chatham, where the depots of the regiments to which they belonged are stationed. The Vulcan left Gravesend about 11 o'clock, and arrived at Woolwich about 1 o'clock p.m., when she was brought up at the dockyard, for the convenience of landing the three companies of Royal Artillery she brought home from Jamaica, Barbados, and Bermuda. The companies landed at the dockyard at 3 o'clock p.m. to-day, and marched up to the Artillery barracks, headed by the band of the regiment, the widows and children having been previously landed under the immediate superintendence of the Rev. Mr. Wright, one of the chaplains of the garrison. Colonel Willis, Lieutenant-Colonel Lake, Brigade-Major Bingham, and Captain Riddell were present at the landing of the companies, and accompanied them to their barracks. The widow and four children of the late Mr.Thompson, who died while serving as bandmaster of the 56th Regiment of Foot also landed at Woolwich. The total number brought home by the Vulcan was 250 soldiers, 59 women, and 166 children, all in very good health.

During the Crimean War, Vulcan operated in the Black Sea, transporting wounded troops from the battle of the Alma to Constantinople in September 1854, and returning with reinforcements in November. A year later, in November 1855, she was taking Russian prisoners to Constantinople.

In May 1858 HMS Vulcan carried 18 officers, 30 sergeants, 16 drummers, and 499 men (also 37 women and 38 children) of the 2nd Battalion, 3rd Regiment of Foot (The Buffs), from England to Malta.

Augustus Chetham Strode was appointed to command her in 1859 to serve in the East Indies and China Station, seeing action in combined operations under the command of Brigadier general Charles William Dunbar Staveley during the Taiping Rebellion in 1862. On 25 January 1863, she rescued all 45 crew and 669 passengers from the merchant ship India, which had been wrecked in the Strait of Malacca three days earlier. On 18 January 1875, Jorawur was abandoned in the Atlantic Ocean whilst on a voyage from London to Calcutta, India. Her crew were rescued by the British ship Epsilon. Jorawur was towed in to Plymouth, Devon on 27 January by the British ship Agenoria.
