= Beşik Bay, Çanakkale =

Body of water in Turkey

Coordinates: 40°12′N 26°24′E

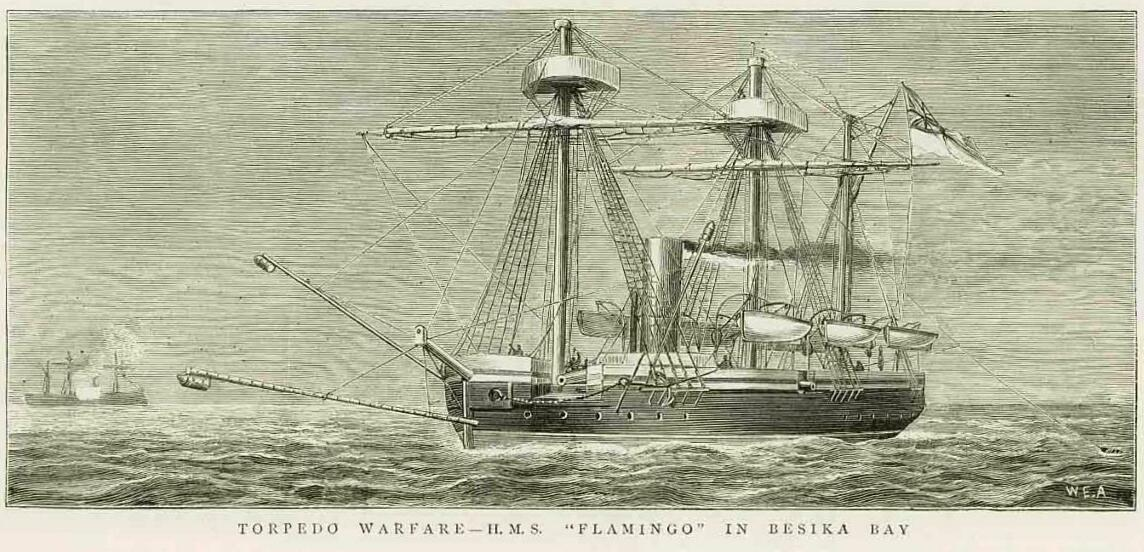
Torpedo Warfare, HMS 'Flamingo' in Besika Bay - The Graphic 1877

Beşik Bay (Turkish: Beşik Koyu, Beşike Koyu or Beşige Koyu) is a small bay on the Aegean shore of Troy, at the mouth of the Hellespont in present-day Asiatic Turkey.

It has been written of since antiquity and throughout the 19th century, and in the 20th was seen as a strategic prize. It played a critical role in the Crimean War, and in the disastrous Gallipoli campaign of World War I.
