= HMS Phaeton (1848) =

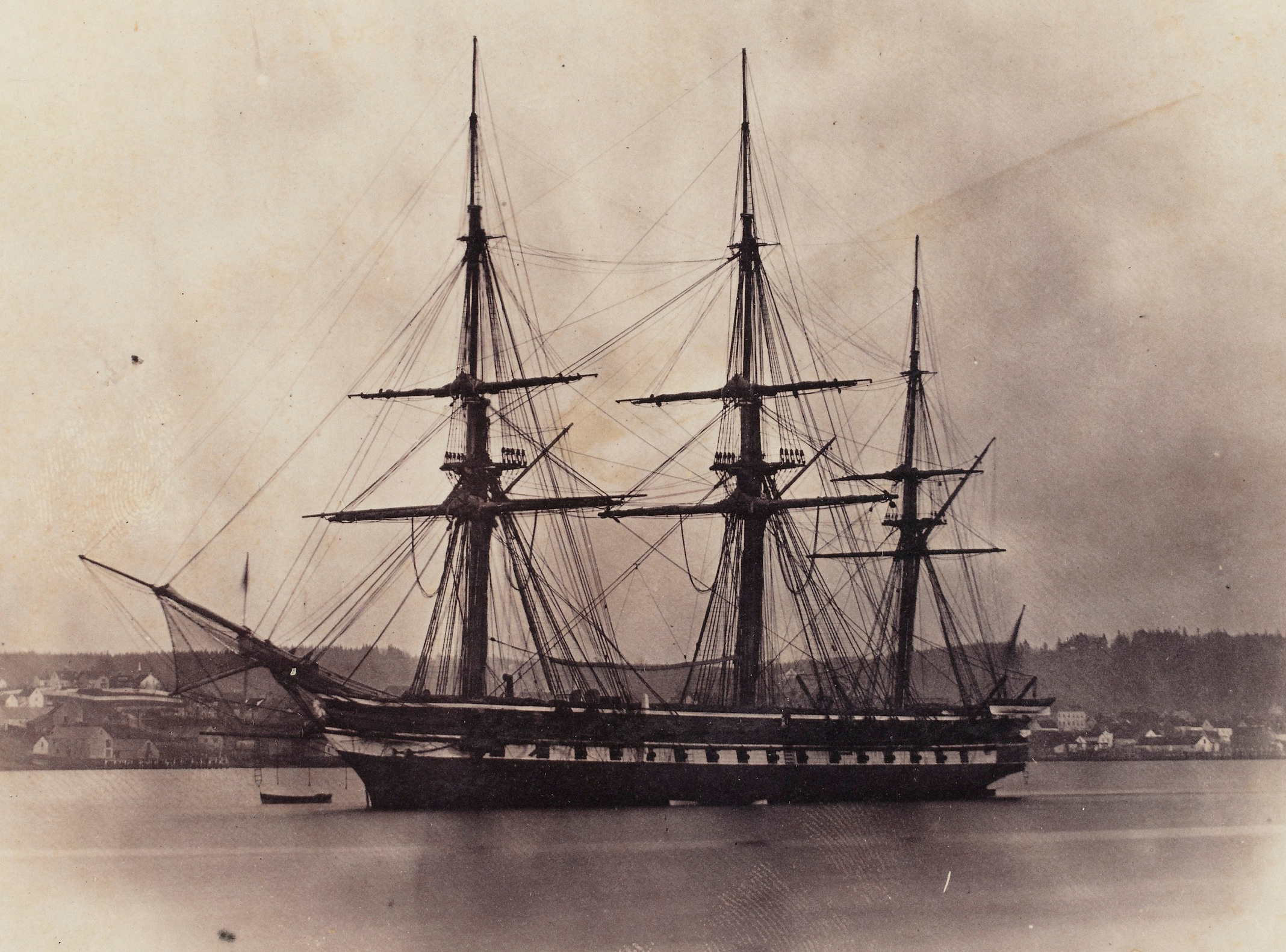
- HMS Phaeton, Halifax, Nova Scotia, 1862, albumen print

History

United Kingdom
- Name: HMS Phaeton
- Ordered: 24 February 1845
- Laid down: 1 September 1845
- Launched: 25 November 1848
- Fate: Broken up 1875

General characteristics
- Displacement: 3099 tons (screw frigate)
- Tons burthen: Originally: 192089/94 (bm; New Act (post 1836)); Screw frigate: 239612/94 (bm)
- Length: Originally; Overall:184 ft 11 in (56.4 m); Keel:152 ft 8 1/2 in (46.5 m); Screw frigate; Overall:220 ft 5 3/8 in (67.2 m); Keel:185 ft 8 5/8 in (56.6 m)
- Beam: Originally:49 ft 5 3/4 in (15.1 m); Screw frigate:49 ft 10 in (15.2 m)
- Propulsion: Originally: Sail; Screw frigate:Steam; Cylinders: 2 × 64" diameter; 3' stroke; NHP:300; IHP:1,566; Speed:10.5 knots
- Complement: 525
- Armament: Originally:8 × 8-inch + 42 × 32-pounder guns; 1865: 39 guns; 1870:28 guns

HMS Phaeton (1848) was a fourth-rate ship of the line of the British Royal Navy, built to a design by Joseph White, of Cowes.

She was launched at Deptford in November 1848. She was originally named Arrogant, but her name was changed to Phaeton shortly after she was ordered. On 20 December 1848 she was at Chatham. From 4 December 1849 to 25 January 1853 Phaeton was under the command of Captain George Augustus Elliot, for "Particular service".

On 30 August 1851 she was part of the Experimental Squadron, the basis for the sailing trials in 1852, to be seen here.

Phaeton was converted to a screw frigate in 1859 at Sheerness, undocking on 12 December 1859 after her conversion. In 1860 was at Sheerness. On 1 November 1861 she was commissioned at Chatham for service on the North America and West Indies Station under Captain Edward Tatham. He remained in command until 24 August 1863. Captain George Le Geyt Bowyear replaced Tatham on the North America and West Indies station until 24 March 1865 when she was paid off at Chatham.

In 1870 Phaeton was at Sheerness.

Phaeton was broken up at Chatham from 24 June 1875.

== Gallery ==
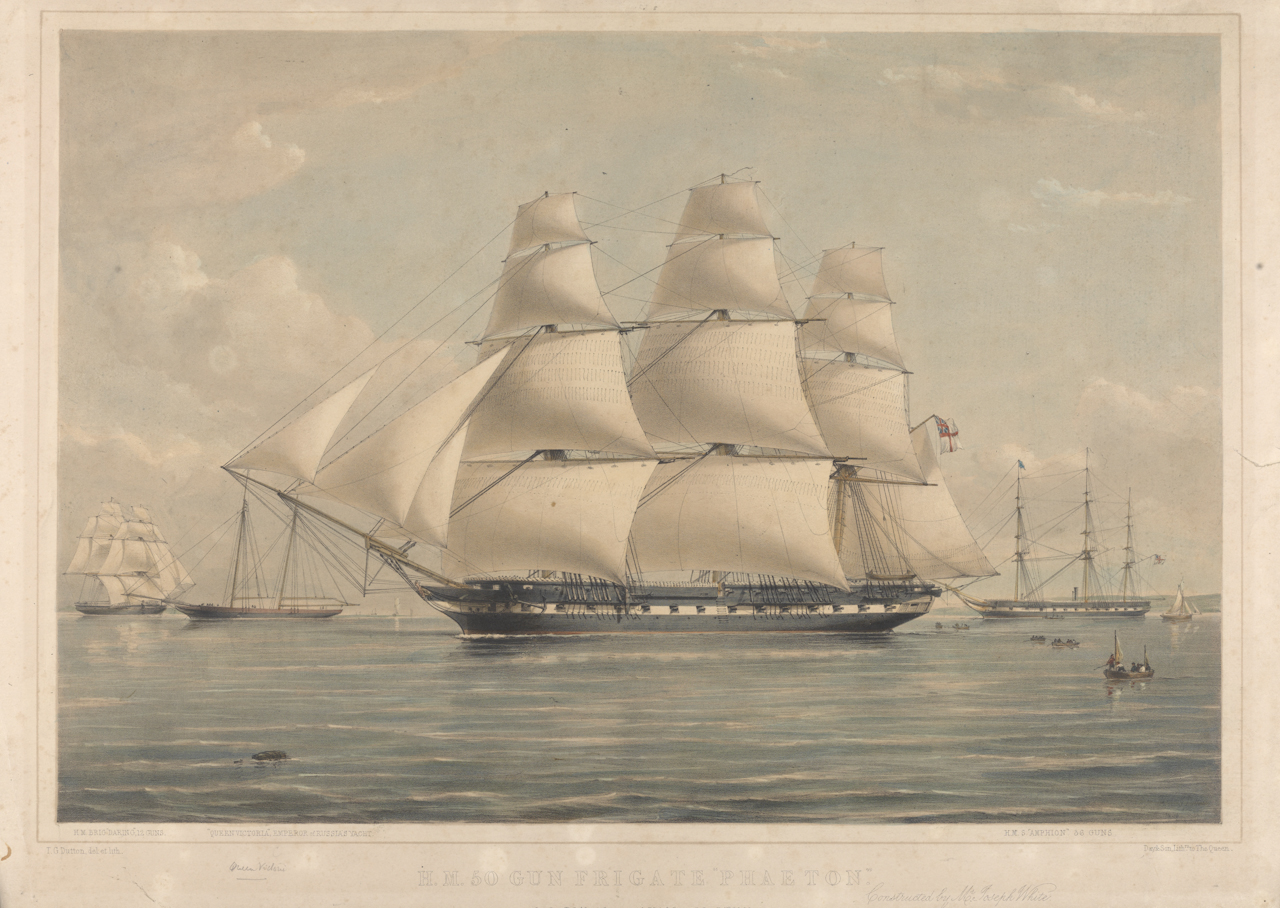
HMS Phaeton, watercolour

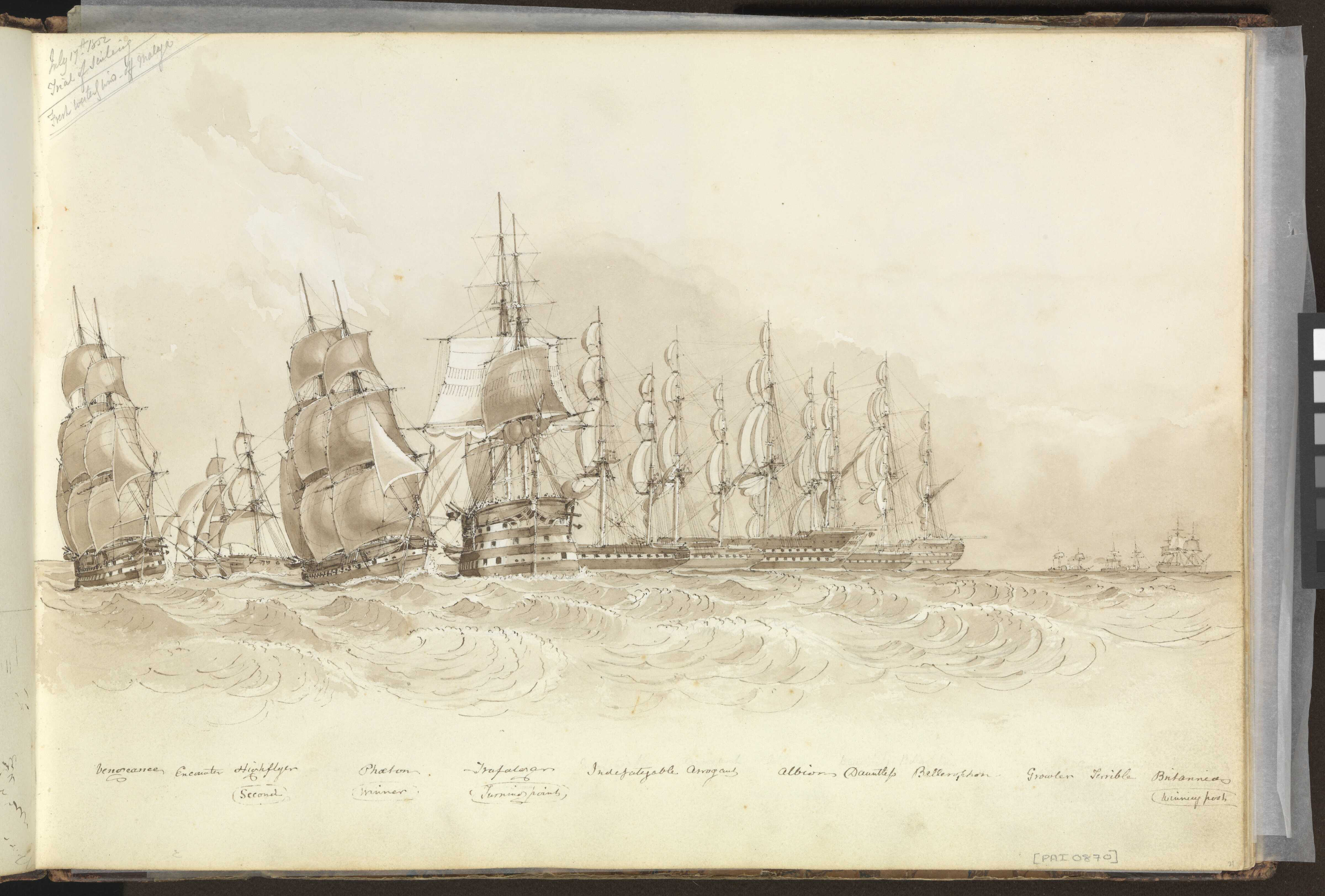
Sailing trial, the turning point, off Malaga, 17 July 1852

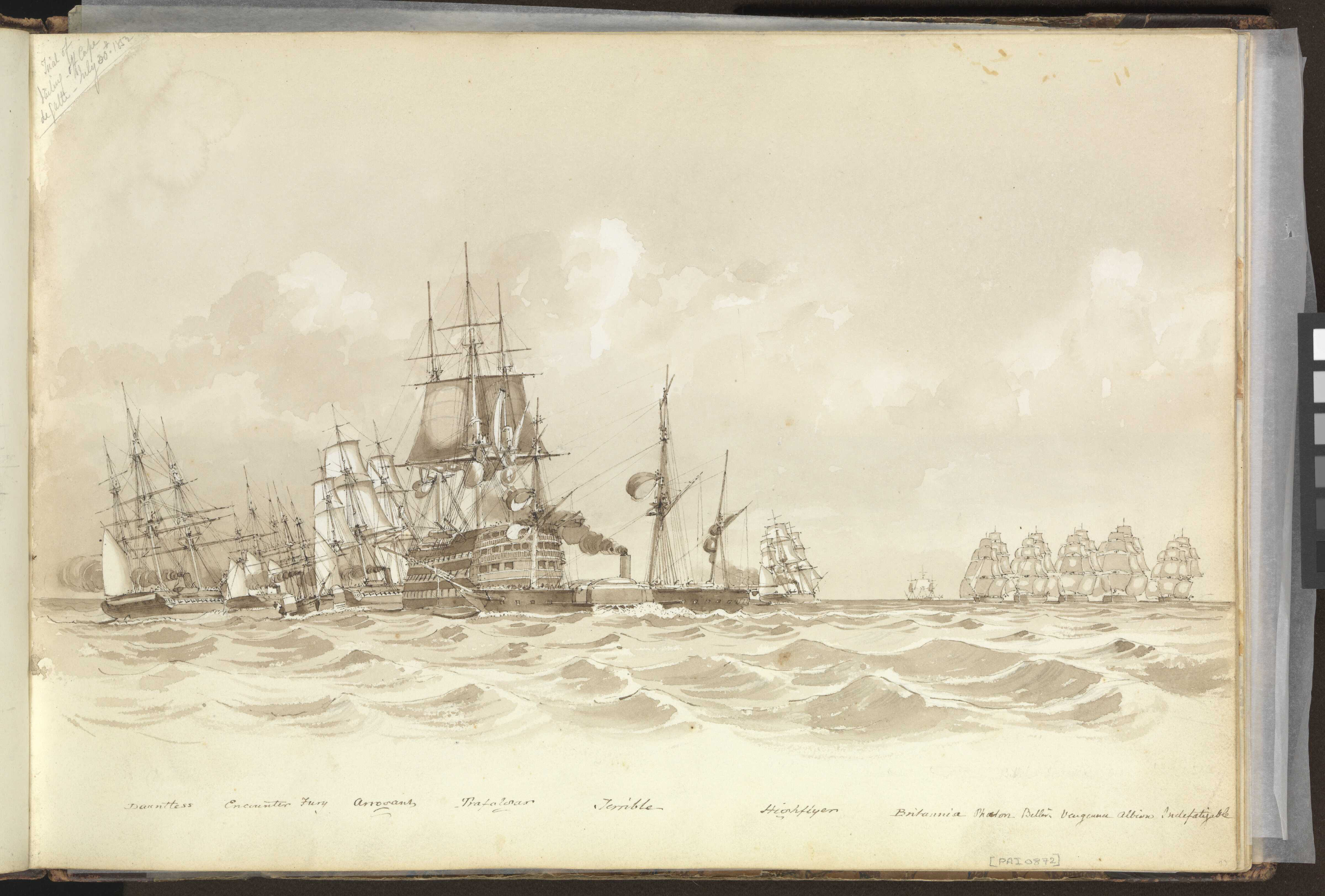
Sailing trials off Cape de Galta (Cabo de Gata), 30 July 1852, Trafalgar and Terrible in the foreground

== Note ==
The National Archives holds the ship's books from 1848 to about 1873.
