= HMS Anson (1860) =

Ship of the line of the Royal Navy

- Anson's half-sister, Revenge, during the 1860s

History

United Kingdom
- Name: Anson
- Ordered: 31 March 1855
- Builder: HM Dockyard, Woolwich
- Laid down: 1 October 1858
- Launched: 15 September 1860
- Completed: 1860
- Renamed: Algiers, 11 January 1883
- Fate: Sold for scrap, April 1904

General characteristics
- Class & type: 91-gun, second rate, Renown-class ship of the line
- Displacement: 5,500 long tons (5,600 t)
- Tons burthen: 3,322 55/94 bm
- Length: 244 ft 10 in (74.6 m) (gun deck)
- Beam: 55 ft 4 in (16.9 m)
- Draught: 24 ft 6 in (7.5 m)
- Depth of hold: 24 ft 5 in (7.4 m)
- Installed power: 3,583 ihp (2,672 kW)
- Propulsion: 1 screw; 1 single-expansion steam engine
- Sail plan: Full-rigged ship
- Speed: 13 knots (24 km/h; 15 mph)
- Complement: 860
- Armament: 91 muzzle-loading, smoothbore guns: Lower deck: 34 × 8 in (203 mm) shell guns; Upper deck: 36 × 32 pdr guns; Quarter deck & Forecastle: 20 × 32 pdrs + 1 × 68 pdr gun

HMS Anson was a 91-gun, second rate, Renown-class ship of the line built for the Royal Navy (RN) during the 1850s. Completed in 1860, the ship was never went to sea and was not commissioned. She was renamed Algiers in 1883. The ship became the flagship of the Admiral-superintendent at HM Dockyard, Chatham, in 1891. Algiers continued in that duty until she was sold for scrap in 1904.

== Background and description ==
The Renown class was a lengthened version of the modified Agamemnon-class ship, HMS Hero. Anson and her sister, Atlas, had their sterns modified to improve the flow of water to their propellers. The ship measured 244 feet 10 inches (74.6 m) on the gun deck and 210 feet (64 m) on the keel. She had a beam of 55 feet 4 inches (16.9 m), a depth of hold of 24 feet 6 inches (7.5 m), and a draught of 24 feet 6 inches (7.5 m). The ship displaced 5,500 long tons (5,600 t) and had a tonnage of 3,315 80/94 tons burthen. Her crew numbered 860 officers and ratings.

The ship was equipped with a two-cylinder, horizontal single-expansion steam engine built by Maudslay, Sons and Field that was rated at 800 nominal horsepower and drove a single propeller shaft. During Anson's sea trials on the Thames River on 24 June 1861, her boilers provided enough steam for the engine to produce 3,583 indicated horsepower (2,672 kW) that was good for a speed of 13 knots (24 km/h; 15 mph), albeit without her rigging. The ships were fitted with three masts and were ship-rigged. To reduce drag and improve performance under sail, they could hoist their propellers into the hull and retract the telescoping funnel.

The Renown-class ships were armed with 91 muzzle-loading, smoothbore guns that consisted of thirty-four 8 in (203 mm) shell guns on their lower gun deck and thirty-six 32-pounder (56 cwt) guns (Note: "Cwt" is the abbreviation for hundredweight, 56 cwt referring to the weight of the gun.) on their upper gun deck. Between the forecastle and quarterdeck, the Renowns carried twenty 32-pounder (45 cwt) guns. The single 68-pounder gun was positioned on the forecastle as a pivot gun so that it could serve as a bow chaser. Her armament was reduced to 81 guns in 1865 and then to 73 guns a decade later.

== Construction and career ==
Named in honour of Admiral Lord George Anson, Anson was the fifth ship of her name to serve with the RN. She was ordered on 31 March 1855, but construction was delayed by labour shortages in the dockyard and the need to season the required timber. The ship was laid down on 1 October 1858 at HM Dockyard, Woolwich, and launched on 15 September 1860. Anson was not commissioned and was placed in ordinary at Sheerness upon completion later that year. She was renamed Algiers on 11 January 1883. The ship served as the flagship of the Admiral-superintendent at HM Dockyard, Chatham, from 1 August 1891 until she was sold for scrap to Henry Castle & Sons in April 1904. Algiers was broken up at their facility in Charlton, London.
