= HMS Defiance (1861) =

Ship of the line of the Royal Navy

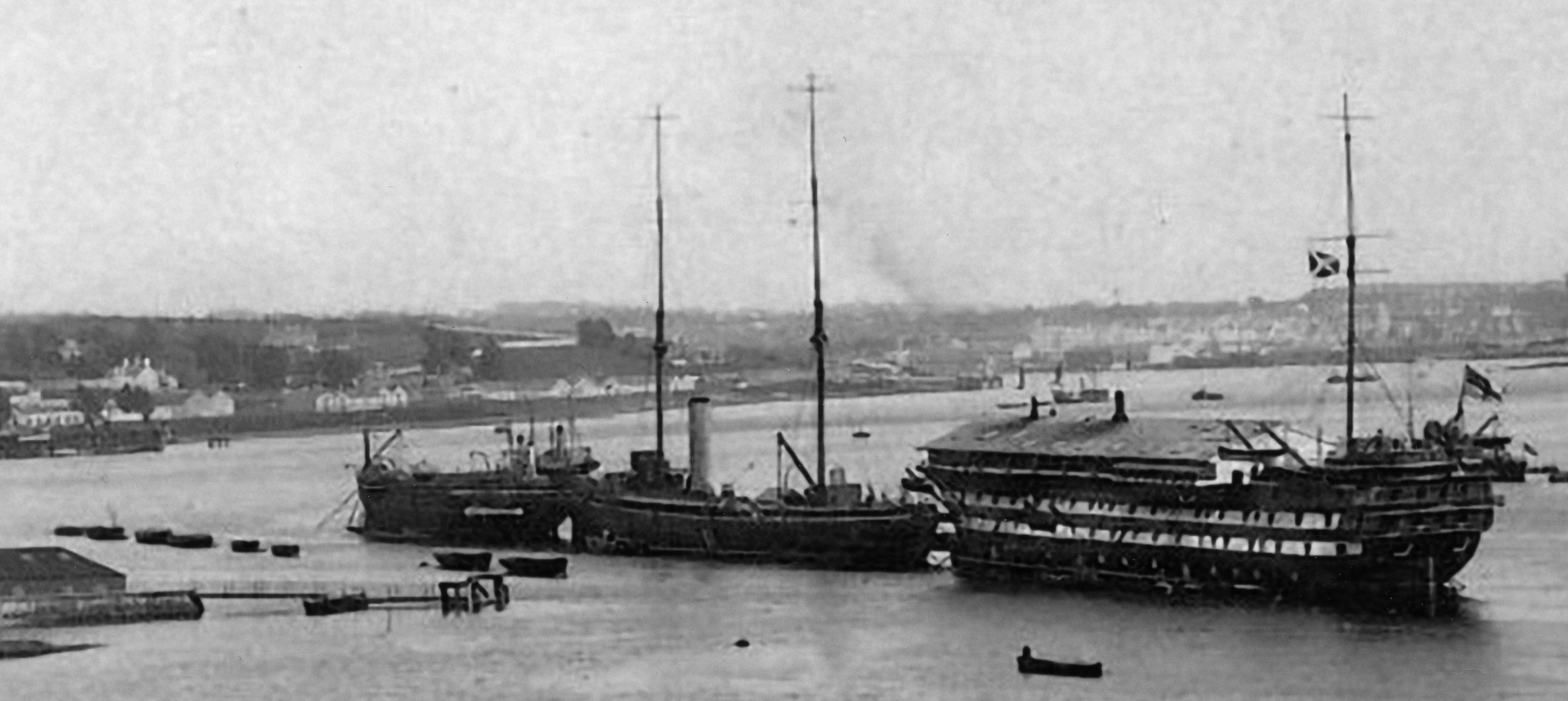
- Defiance moored at Saltash

Class overview
- Name: Defiance
- Operators: Royal Navy
- Preceded by: HMS Brunswick
- Succeeded by: Duncan class
- Built: 1858–1861
- In service: 1884–1931
- Completed: 1
- Scrapped: 1

History

United Kingdom
- Name: Defiance
- Ordered: 31 March 1855
- Builder: HM Dockyard, Pembroke
- Laid down: 20 September 1858
- Launched: 27 March 1861
- Completed: 27 June 1861
- Commissioned: 13 December 1884
- Reclassified: As a schoolship, 13 December 1884
- Fate: Sold for scrap, 26 June 1931

General characteristics
- Type: 91-gun, second rate, ship of the line
- Displacement: 3,958 long tons (4,022 t)
- Tons burthen: 3,475 31/94 (bm)
- Length: 254 ft 9 in (77.6 m) (gun deck)
- Beam: 55 ft 4 in (16.9 m)
- Draught: 24 ft 6 in (7.5 m)
- Depth of hold: 24 ft 6 in (7.5 m)
- Installed power: Boilers; 3,550 ihp (2,650 kW)
- Propulsion: 1 shaft; single-expansion steam engine
- Sail plan: Full-rigged ship
- Speed: 11.9 knots (22.0 km/h; 13.7 mph)
- Complement: 860 officers and ratings
- Armament: 91 muzzle-loading, smoothbore guns: Lower deck: 34 × 8 in (203 mm) shell guns; Upper deck: 36 × 32 pdr guns; Quarter deck & Forecastle: 20 × 32 pdrs + 1 × 68 pdr gun

HMS Defiance was a 91-gun, second rate, screw-powered ship of the line built for the Royal Navy (RN) during the 1850s. She was the last wooden ship of the line launched for the RN. Completed in 1861, she never saw active service, spending the next 23 years in ordinary. Defiance was finally commissioned in 1884 to serve as a school ship. The ship was sold for scrap in 1931.

== Background and description ==
Defiance's design was based on that of the modified Renown class, lengthened by 10 feet (3 m) and with the shape of her bow refined. She was the last ship to use the midsection design that Isaac Watts created for the Agamemnon class. The ship measured 254 feet 9 inches (77.6 m) on the gun deck and 219 feet 11 inches (67 m) on the keel. She had a beam of 55 feet 4 inches (16.9 m), a depth of hold of 24 feet 6 inches (7.5 m), and a draught of 24 feet, 6 inches. Defiance displaced 3,958 long tons (4,022 t) and had a tonnage of 3,475 31/94 tons burthen. Her crew numbered 860 officers and ratings.

The ship was equipped with a two-cylinder, horizontal single-expansion steam engine built by Maudslay, Sons and Field that was rated at 800 nominal horsepower and drove a single propeller shaft. During Defiance's sea trials off Plymouth on 5 February 1862, her boilers provided enough steam for the engine to produce 3,550 indicated horsepower (2,650 kW) that was good for a speed of 11.9 knots (22.0 km/h; 13.7 mph), albeit without masts, rigging or stores. The ship was fitted with three masts and were ship-rigged. To reduce drag and improve performance under sail, she could hoist her propeller into the hull and retract the telescoping funnel.

Like the Renowns, Defiance was armed with ninety-one muzzle-loading, smoothbore guns that consisted of thirty-four 8 in (203 mm) shell guns on her lower gun deck and thirty-six 32-pounder (56 cwt) guns (Note: "Cwt" is the abbreviation for hundredweight, 56 cwt referring to the weight of the gun.) on her upper gun deck. Between the forecastle and quarterdeck, she carried twenty 32-pounder (45 cwt) guns. The single 68-pounder gun was positioned on the forecastle as a pivot gun so that it could serve as a bow chaser.

== Construction and career ==
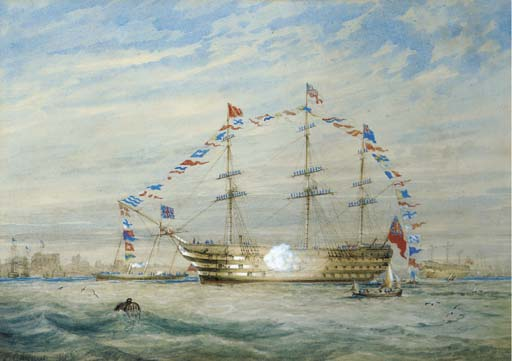
Defiance fires a salute in honour of the Queen's birthday

Defiance was the twelfth ship of her name to serve with the RN. She was ordered on 31 March 1855 and was laid down on 20 September 1858 at HM Dockyard, Pembroke. The ship was launched on 27 March 1861. Defiance was not commissioned and was placed in ordinary upon completion on 27 June.

On 13 December 1884 Defiance was commissioned as the torpedo and mining schoolship in Devonport. In 1895, Captain Henry Jackson was appointed to the command of Defiance, and over the next two years carried out experiments on wireless transmission that would lead to the introduction of wireless telegraphy to the RN. Commander Frederick Hamilton was appointed in command on 1 November 1897, and re-appointed in early January 1898 after promotion to captain.

Defiance was sold for scrap to Castle's on 26 June 1931 for be dismantled at Millbay, Plymouth.

== Bibliography ==
- Colledge, J. J.; Warlow, Ben & Bush, Steve (2020). Ships of the Royal Navy: The Complete Record of all Fighting Ships of the Royal Navy from the 15th Century to the Present (5th revised and updated ed.). Seaforth Publishing. ISBN 978-1-5267-9327-0.
- Lambert, Andrew D. (1984). Battleships in Transition: The Creation of the Steam Battlefleet 1815-1860. Conway Maritime Press. ISBN 0-85177-315-X.
- Pocock, R. F. & Garratt, Gerald Reginald Mansel (1972). The Origins of Maritime Radio: The Story of the Introduction of wireless telegraphy in the Royal Navy Between 1896 and 1900. H.M. Stationery Office. pp. 4–8. ISBN 978-0-11-290113-6.
- Warlow, B. (2000) [1992]. Shore Establishments of the Royal Navy (Revised and enlarged ed.). Maritime Books. ISBN 0-907771-73-4.
- Winfield, Rif (2014). British Warships in the Age of Sail 1817–1863: Design, Construction, Careers and Fates. Seaforth Publishing. ISBN 978-1-84832-169-4.
