= HMS Atlas (1860) =

Ship of the line of the Royal Navy

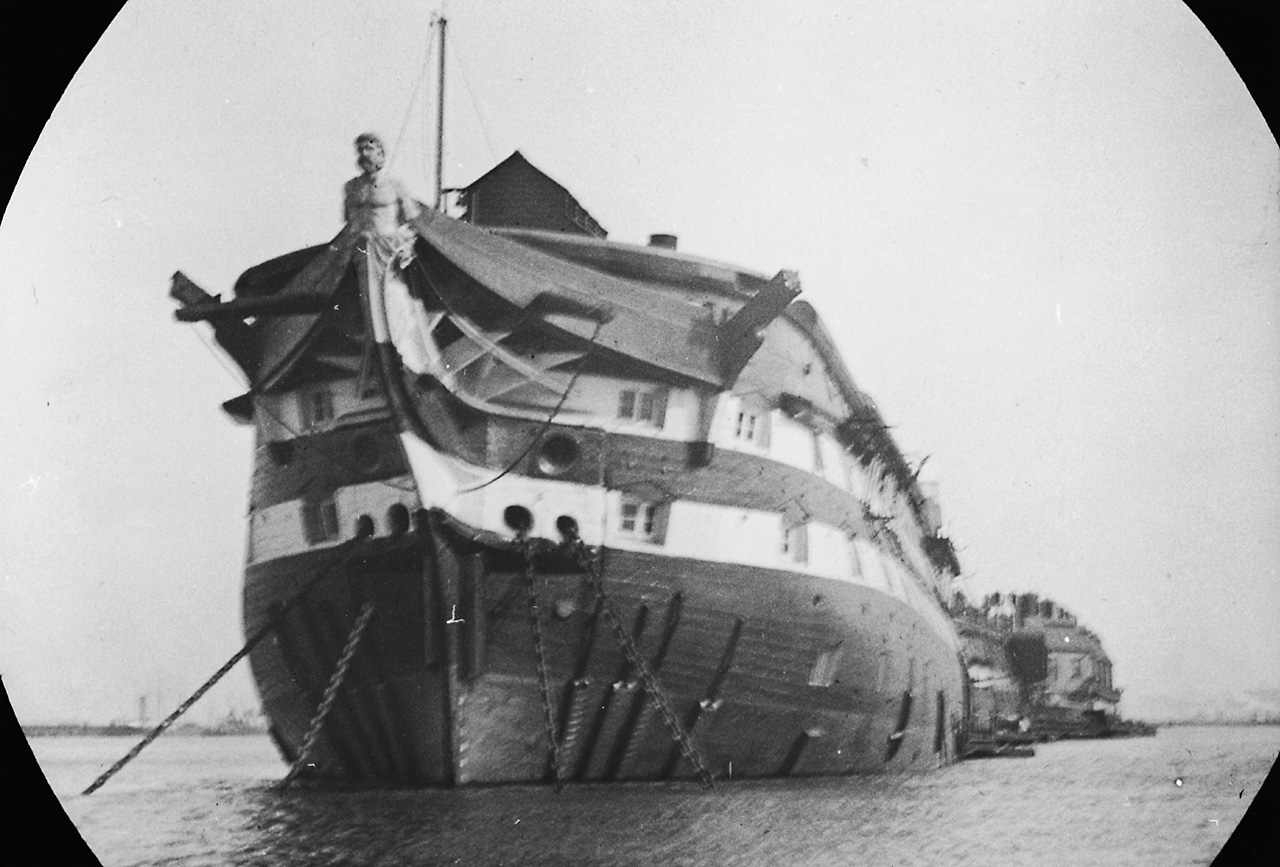
- Atlas, with Endymion and Castalia behind her, 1901

History

United Kingdom
- Name: Atlas
- Namesake: Atlas
- Owner: Royal Navy
- Ordered: 31 March 1855
- Builder: Chatham Dockyard
- Laid down: 23 February 1858
- Launched: 21 July 1860
- In service: 1861 (in reserve)
- Out of service: 1885
- Reclassified: As Hospital ship, July 1881
- Fate: Sold, 1885

United Kingdom
- Name: Atlas
- Owner: Metropolitan Asylums Board
- Acquired: 1885
- In service: July 1881
- Out of service: 1904
- Home port: Deptford
- Fate: Sold for scrap, December 1904

General characteristics
- Class & type: 91-gun, second rate, Renown-class ship of the line
- Displacement: 5,500 long tons (5,600 t)
- Tons burthen: 3,317 62/94 bm
- Length: 244 ft 8 in (74.6 m) (gun deck)
- Beam: 55 ft 4 in (16.9 m)
- Draught: 24 ft 6 in (7.5 m)
- Depth of hold: 24 ft 6 in (7.5 m)
- Installed power: 3,732 ihp (2,783 kW)
- Propulsion: 1 screw; 1 single-expansion steam engine
- Sail plan: Full-rigged ship
- Speed: 13 knots (24 km/h; 15 mph)
- Complement: 860
- Armament: 91 muzzle-loading, smoothbore guns: Lower deck: 34 × 8 in (203 mm) shell guns; Upper deck: 36 × 32 pdr guns; Quarter deck & Forecastle: 20 × 32 pdrs + 1 × 68 pdr gun

HMS Atlas was a 91-gun, second rate, Renown-class ship of the line built for the Royal Navy (RN) during the 1850s. Completed in 1860, she was never fitted for sea and spent her entire service in reserve or as a hospital ship. The ship was lent to the Metropolitan Asylums Board for use as a hospital ship in 1881, and sold to them in 1885. Atlas served until 1904, when she was sold for breaking.

== Background and description ==
The Renown class was a lengthened version of the modified Agamemnon-class ship, HMS Hero. Atlas and her sister, Anson, had their sterns modified to improve the flow of water to their propellers. The ship measured 244 feet 8 inches (74.6 m) on the gun deck and 210 feet (64 m) on the keel. She had a beam of 55 feet 4 inches (16.9 m), a depth of hold of 24 feet 6 inches (7.5 m), and a draught of 24 feet, 6 inches. Atlas displaced 5,500 long tons (5,600 t) and had a tonnage of 3,317 62/94 tons burthen. Her crew numbered 860 officers and ratings.

The ship was equipped with a two-cylinder, horizontal single-expansion steam engine built by Maudslay, Sons and Field that was rated at 800 nominal horsepower and drove a single propeller shaft. During Atlas's sea trials on the Thames River on 25 April 1861, her boilers provided enough steam for the engine to produce 3,732 indicated horsepower (2,783 kW) that was good for a speed of 13 knots (24 km/h; 15 mph), albeit without her masts or stores. The ships were fitted with three masts and were ship-rigged. To reduce drag and improve performance under sail, they could hoist their propellers into the hull and retract the telescoping funnel.

The Renown-class ships were armed with 91 muzzle-loading, smoothbore guns that consisted of thirty-four 8 in (203 mm) shell guns on their lower gun deck and thirty-six 32-pounder (56 cwt) guns (Note: "Cwt" is the abbreviation for hundredweight, 56 cwt referring to the weight of the gun.) on their upper gun deck. Between the forecastle and quarterdeck, the Renowns carried twenty 32-pounder (45 cwt) guns. The single 68-pounder gun was positioned on the forecastle as a pivot gun so that it could serve as a bow chaser.

== Construction and career ==
Named after the Titan from Greek mythology, Atlas was the second ship of her name to serve in the RN. She was ordered on 31 March 1855, but construction was delayed by labour shortages in the dockyard and the need to season the required timber. The ship was laid down on 1 October 1858 at HM Dockyard, Chatham, and was one of the ships under construction there that were inspected by the Lords Commissioners of the Admiralty on 23 August 1859. Atlas was launched on 21 July 1860. Three days later, Atlas was taken to Sheerness Dockyard to be fitted with her steam engine. By April 1861, Atlas was undergoing her sea trials under steam. The ship was not commissioned and was placed in ordinary at Sheerness from 1861. Atlas was transferred to Chatham in 1874.

=== Hospital ship ===
In June 1881, the Lords of the Admiralty agreed to lend Atlas and Endymion to the Metropolitan Asylums Board along with a steam pinnace, due to an outbreak of smallpox. Atlas was to be converted into a hospital ship for 250 patients. The Metropolitan Asylums Board was to insure Atlas and Endymion for £11,000 and £8,000 respectively. There was opposition to the proposed use of Atlas from the Thames Conservancy and other public and private bodies. Agreement had been made to lease a berth at Deptford, Kent, but when the managers of a company with premises nearby learned of the proposed use of Atlas as an isolation hospital, they put pressure on the owners of the berth with the result that the owners then decided not to allow Atlas to be berthed there.

She was stationed at Greenwich, Kent, from July in a berth which had been previously used for another hospital ship. This drew an objection from the shipbuilders J. and G. Rennie because some of their employees refused to work near the riverside where Atlas was moored. It was also necessary to move Atlas and Endymion every time Rennie's launched a ship. Atlas was acquired by the board on 4 June, and Endymion on 5 July. Atlas housed 120 patients. In 1882, the Thames Conservancy wrote to the Metropolitan Asylums Board urging them to move Atlas and Endymion from Greenwich. The Thames Conservancy also called upon the board to pay a large claim for expenses incurred by Messrs Rennie's. At a meeting of the board, it was suggested that if moved, Atlas should be used for convalescent patients. The board decided to await the report from a Royal Commission into infectious diseases hospitals before deciding whether or not to move the ships.

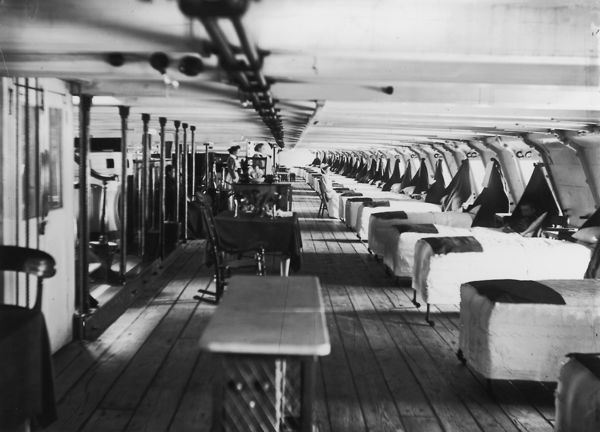
A ward on board Atlas

In August 1882, Atlas was moved to nearby Deptford Creek, and in 1883 downstream to Long Reach, near Dartford. In February 1885, a meeting of the Metropolitan Asylums Board was informed that the Admiralty had stated that if the board wished to continue using Atlas and Endymion, they would have to purchase them at a cost of £8,400 and £6,500 respectively. The board replied that they would purchase the ships, but asked for the cost to be reduced. In June, it was reported that the board were authorised to purchase both ships. Following a fire on the training ship Goliath in 1875, engines and a generator were installed on board Atlas in 1886 to provide the ship with electric light, given that oil lamps had been deemed a fire hazard. Atlas served as a hospital ship until 1904, when the new Joyce Green Hospital opened at Dartford, Kent. Atlas was sold by auction in December, along with Endymion and Castalia for a total of £8,045. Atlas realised £3,725.

== See also ==
- Healthcare in London

== Bibliography ==
- Colledge, J. J.; Warlow, Ben & Bush, Steve (2020). Ships of the Royal Navy: The Complete Record of all Fighting Ships of the Royal Navy from the 15th Century to the Present (5th revised and updated ed.). Seaforth Publishing. ISBN 978-1-5267-9327-0.
- Lambert, Andrew D. (1984). Battleships in Transition: The Creation of the Steam Battlefleet 1815-1860. Conway Maritime Press. ISBN 0-85177-315-X.
- Manning, T. D. & Walker, C. F. (1959). British Warship Names. Putnam. OCLC 838607.
- Winfield, Rif (2014). British Warships in the Age of Sail 1817–1863: Design, Construction, Careers and Fates. Seaforth Publishing. ISBN 978-1-84832-169-4.
