= HMS Renown (1857) =

Ship of the line of the Royal Navy

- An engraving of Renown as a German artillery training ship in 1878 by Fritz Stoltenberg

History

United Kingdom
- Name: Renown
- Ordered: 2 April 1853
- Builder: HM Dockyard, Chatham
- Laid down: 20 December 1854
- Launched: 28 March 1857
- Completed: 20 February 1858
- Commissioned: 21 November 1857
- Fate: Sold to the North German Confederation, 24 March 1870

North German Confederation
- Name: SMS Renown
- Acquired: 23 March 1870
- Commissioned: 18 April 1870
- Fate: Transferred to the Imperial German Navy, 1 January 1871

German Empire
- Decommissioned: 20 September 1881
- Out of service: 1889
- Reclassified: As an artillery training ship, 1871; As an accommodation ship, 1884
- Fate: Sold for scrap, 1892

General characteristics
- Class & type: 91-gun, second rate, Renown-class ship of the line
- Displacement: 5,500 long tons (5,600 t)
- Tons burthen: 3,319 14/94 bm
- Length: 244 ft 10 in (74.6 m) (gun deck)
- Beam: 55 ft 4 in (16.9 m)
- Draught: 24 ft 6 in (7.5 m)
- Depth of hold: 24 ft 5 in (7.4 m)
- Installed power: 3,183 ihp (2,374 kW)
- Propulsion: 1 screw; 1 single-expansion steam engine
- Sail plan: Full-rigged ship
- Speed: 11.4 knots (21.1 km/h; 13.1 mph)
- Complement: 860
- Armament: 91 muzzle-loading, smoothbore guns: Lower deck: 34 × 8 in (203 mm) shell guns; Upper deck: 36 × 32 pdr guns; Quarter deck & Forecastle: 20 × 32 pdrs + 1 × 68 pdr gun

HMS Renown was the lead ship of her class of four 91-gun, second rate, ships of the line built for the Royal Navy (RN) during the 1850s. Completed in 1858, she only had one tour of active duty, during which she served with the Channel Squadron and then the Mediterranean Fleet. Upon her return home in 1861, Renown was paid off and placed in ordinary. The ship was sold to the North German Confederation in 1870, which became the German Empire the following year. Retaining her original name, the ship served as a gunnery training ship until 1881. She was subsequently hulked and converted into a barracks ship. Renown was sold for scrap in 1892.

== Background and description ==
The Renown class was a lengthened version of the modified Agamemnon-class ship, HMS Hero. Renown measured 244 feet 10 inches (74.6 m) on the gun deck and 210 feet 1 inch (64.0 m) on the keel. She had a beam of 55 feet 4 inches (16.9 m), a depth of hold of 24 feet 6 inches (7.5 m), and a draught of 24 feet 6 inches (7.5 m). The ship displaced 5,500 long tons (5,600 t) and had a tonnage of 3,319 14/94 tons burthen. Her crew numbered 860 officers and ratings.

The ship was equipped with a two-cylinder, horizontal single-expansion steam engine built by John Penn and Sons that was rated at 800 nominal horsepower and drove a single propeller shaft. By the time the ship was sold to Germany in 1870, she was fitted with a two-bladed propeller 17 feet 1 inch (5.2 m) in diameter. During Renown's sea trials on 15 March 1858, her six boilers provided enough steam for the engine to produce 3,183 indicated horsepower (2,374 kW) that was good for a speed of 11.4 knots (21.1 km/h; 13.1 mph). The ships were fitted with three masts and were ship-rigged. To reduce drag and improve performance under sail, they could hoist their propellers into the hull and retract the telescoping funnel. In German service, the area of Renown's sails totalled 48,000 sq ft (4,500 m^{2}) until 1872. The following year, the ship had her boilers replaced by four units that had been in the steam frigate Hertha; their working pressure was 1.3 atm (130 kPa; 19 psi).

The Renown-class ships were armed with 91 muzzle-loading, smoothbore guns that consisted of thirty-four 8 in (203 mm) shell guns on their lower gun deck and thirty-six 32-pounder (56 cwt) guns (Note: "Cwt" is the abbreviation for hundredweight, 56 cwt referring to the weight of the gun.) on their upper gun deck. Between the forecastle and quarterdeck, the Renowns carried twenty 32-pounder (45 cwt) guns. The single 68-pounder gun was positioned on the forecastle as a pivot gun so that it could serve as a bow chaser. While in ordinary during the 1860s, her armament was gradually reduced to 89 guns, then 81 guns and consisted of 54 guns by 1869.

== Construction and career ==
Renown was the fifth ship of her name to serve with the RN. She was ordered on 2 April 1853 as a copy of Hero, but her design was lengthened by 10 feet 6 inches (3.2 m) to improve her lines and provide more room for a more powerful engine on 7 December 1854. Despite this, the ship was laid down on 28 March at HM Dockyard, Chatham, and launched on 28 March 1857. Renown was commissioned on 21 November by Captain Arthur Forbes and completed on 20 February 1858 for service with the Channel Squadron. She briefly served as the flagship of its commander-in-chief, Rear-Admiral Charles Fremantle in August. The ship was transferred to the Mediterranean Fleet in May 1859. She returned home to be paid off on 25 September 1861 and was placed in ordinary.

Renown was sold to the North German Confederation on 24 March 1870 and was commmissioned on 18 April, retaining her own name. She was based at Kiel beginning on 28 June and assumed gunnery training duties there the following year. The ship was transferred to Wilhelmshaven in April 1872. Renown was hulked on 30 September 1881 with her propulsion machinery transferred to the training ship Mars; she served as an accommodation ship from 1884 to 1889. The ship was sold for scrap in 1892 and towed to England for demolition.
