= HMS Revenge (1859) =

Ship of the line of the Royal Navy

- Revenge during the 1860s

History

United Kingdom
- Name: Revenge
- Ordered: 2 April 1853
- Builder: HM Dockyard, Pembroke
- Laid down: 22 January 1854
- Launched: 16 April 1859
- Completed: 8 June 1861
- Commissioned: 1 May 1861
- Renamed: Empress, March 1890
- Reclassified: As a training ship, March 1890
- Fate: Sold for scrap, 31 December 1923

General characteristics
- Class & type: 91-gun, second rate, Renown-class ship of the line
- Displacement: 5,500 long tons (5,600 t)
- Tons burthen: 3,322 55/94 bm
- Length: 244 ft 9 in (74.6 m) (gun deck)
- Beam: 55 ft 4 in (16.9 m)
- Draught: 24 ft 6 in (7.5 m)
- Depth of hold: 24 ft 5 in (7.4 m)
- Installed power: 3,028 ihp (2,258 kW)
- Propulsion: 1 screw; 1 single-expansion steam engine
- Sail plan: Full-rigged ship
- Speed: 11.5 knots (21.3 km/h; 13.2 mph)
- Complement: 860
- Armament: 91 muzzle-loading, smoothbore guns: Lower deck: 34 × 8 in (203 mm) shell guns; Upper deck: 36 × 32 pdr guns; Quarter deck & Forecastle: 20 × 32 pdrs + 1 × 68 pdr gun

HMS Revenge was a 91-gun, second rate, Renown-class ship of the line built for the Royal Navy (RN) during the 1850s. Completed in 1861, she spent much of her career as a flagship, first of the Channel Fleet and then of the second-in-command of the Mediterranean Fleet. The ship served as a guard ship between 1865 and 1869. Revenge was recommissioned in 1869 to serve as a naval transport ferrying crews and admirals between Britain and various foreign stations before she was paid off in early 1870. Recommissioned two years later, she served as the flagship of a port admiral in Ireland and mostly remained in that job until she was paid off in 1890. Renamed Empress that year, she served as a training ship until she was sold for scrap in 1923.

== Background and description ==
The Renown class was a lengthened version of the modified Agamemnon-class ship, HMS Hero. Revenge measured 244 feet 9 inches (74.6 m) on the gun deck and 210 feet (64 m) on the keel. She had a beam of 55 feet 4 inches (16.9 m), a depth of hold of 24 feet 6 inches (7.5 m), and a draught of 24 feet 6 inches (7.5 m). The ship displaced 5,500 long tons (5,600 t) and had a tonnage of 3,322 55/94 tons burthen. Her crew numbered 860 officers and ratings.

The ship was equipped with a two-cylinder, horizontal single-expansion steam engine built by Maudslay, Sons and Field that was rated at 800 nominal horsepower and drove a single propeller shaft. During Revenge's sea trials on 14 February 1860, her boilers provided enough steam for the engine to produce 3,028 indicated horsepower (2,258 kW) that was good for a speed of 11.5 knots (21.3 km/h; 13.2 mph). The ships were fitted with three masts and were ship-rigged. To reduce drag and improve performance under sail, they could hoist their propellers into the hull and retract the telescoping funnel.

The Renown-class ships were armed with 91 muzzle-loading, smoothbore guns that consisted of thirty-four 8 in (203 mm) shell guns on their lower gun deck and thirty-six 32-pounder (56 cwt) guns (Note: "Cwt" is the abbreviation for hundredweight, 56 cwt referring to the weight of the gun.) on their upper gun deck. Between the forecastle and quarterdeck, the Renowns carried twenty 32-pounder (45 cwt) guns. The single 68-pounder gun was positioned on the forecastle as a pivot gun so that it could serve as a bow chaser.

== Construction and career ==
Revenge was the eighth ship of her name to serve with the RN. She was ordered on 2 April 1853 as a copy of Hero, but her design was lengthened by 10 feet 6 inches (3.2 m) to improve her lines and provide more room for a more powerful engine on 7 December 1854. Despite this, the ship was laid down on 22 January 1854 at HM Dockyard, Pembroke, and launched on 16 April 1859. Revenge was commissioned on 1 May 1861 by Captain Charles Fellowes and completed on 8 June 1856 for service with the Channel Squadron as the flagship of its commander-in-chief, Rear-Admiral Robert Smart. Fellowes was relieved by Captain Fitzgerald Foley on 13 June 1863 and the ship became the flagship of Rear Admiral Hastings Yelverton, second-in-command of the Mediterranean Fleet. By this time her armament had been reduced to 73 guns. Revenge was paid off on 26 April 1865.

She was recommissioned on 1 September by Captain Thomas Henry Mason to serve as the guard ship for Pembroke Dock, but he was superseded the following day by Captain George Bowyer. He was relieved by Captain William Pullen in 1867. The ship was paid off on 11 March 1869. Revenge was recommissioned on 15 April by Captain Thomas Cochran as a naval transport ferrying replacement crews and admirals to foreign stations; her first voyage thus was to take Vice-Admiral Alexander Mile to assume command of the Mediterranean Fleet and exchange the whole crew with that of the current flagship, Caledonia, and return home under the command of Captain Henry Gardner as Vice-Admiral George Rodney Mundy's flagship. The ship did this three more times before she was paid off on 23 March 1870.

Revenge was recommissioned by Captain Benjamin Pickard on 22 August 1872 to serve as the flagship of Rear-Admiral Edmund Heathcote, port admiral at Queenstown (modern Cobh), Ireland. The ship was tasked to carry out another naval transport mission in January 1874 to relieve Vice-Admiral Yelverton, the commander-in-chief of the Mediterranean Fleet, with Vice-Admiral James Robert Drummond. She also carried replacement crewmen for several ships who returned home in Revenge. The ship resumed her previous role as flagship of the Queenstown port admiral on 17 February 1875. By 1881, her armament had been reduced to 28 guns. Revenge continued as the flagship there until she was paid off on 8 March 1890. Later that month, she was renamed Empress and loaned to the Clyde Industrial Training Ship Association. The ship was sold for scrap on 31 December 1923 and subsequently broken up at Appledore.
