= Renown-class ship of the line =

Ship of the line of the Royal Navy

- Revenge during the 1860

Class overview
- Name: Renown
- Operators: Royal Navy
- Preceded by: Vanguard-class ship of the line
- Succeeded by: HMS Brunswick
- Built: 1854–1861
- In service: 1854–1904
- In commission: 1857–1890
- Completed: 4
- Scrapped: 4

General characteristics
- Type: 91-gun, second rate, ship of the line
- Displacement: 5,500 long tons (5,600 t)
- Tons burthen: 3,317 78/94 bm
- Length: 244 ft 9 in (74.6 m) (gun deck)
- Beam: 55 ft 4 in (16.9 m)
- Draught: 24 ft 6 in (7.5 m)
- Depth of hold: 24 ft 5 in (7.4 m)
- Installed power: Boilers; 3,183–3,732 ihp (2,374–2,783 kW)
- Propulsion: 1 screw; 1 single-expansion steam engine
- Sail plan: Full-rigged ship
- Speed: 11.5–13 knots (21.3–24.1 km/h; 13.2–15.0 mph)
- Complement: 860
- Armament: 91 muzzle-loading, smoothbore guns: Lower deck: 34 × 8 in (203 mm) shell guns; Upper deck: 36 × 32 pdr guns; Quarter deck & Forecastle: 20 × 32 pdrs + 1 × 68 pdr gun

The Renown class consisted of four 91-gun, second-rate ships of the line built for the Royal Navy (RN) during the 1850s.

== Background and description ==
Completion of the French fast steam-powered, second-rate Napoléon in early 1852 and the French preparations for building more like her caused an invasion scare that prompted the First Derby ministry to authorize a large programme of steam-powered ships of the line to maintain British naval superiority; thus initiating a naval arms race between France and Britain. Influenced by the Surveyor of the Navy, Captain Baldwin Wake Walker's assessment of the French programme, the First Lord of the Admiralty, Sir James Graham concurred with Walker and ordered the first pair of the Renown class, Renown and her sister Revenge in early 1853.

The Renown class was a lengthened version of the modified Agamemnon-class ship, HMS Hero. The ships measured 244 feet 9 inches (74.6 m) on the gun deck and 210 feet (64 m) on the keel. They had a beam of 55 feet 4 inches (16.9 m), a depth of hold of 24 feet 6 inches (7.5 m), and a draught of 24 feet 6 inches (7.5 m). The ships displaced 5,500 long tons (5,600 t) and had a tonnage of 3,317 78/94 tons burthen. Their crew numbered 860 officers and ratings.

The ships were equipped with a two-cylinder, horizontal single-expansion steam engine that was rated at 800 nominal horsepower and drove a single propeller shaft. During their sea trials their boilers provided enough steam for the engine to produce 3,028 indicated horsepower (2,258 kW) that was good for a speed of 11.5 knots (21.3 km/h; 13.2 mph). The ships were fitted with three masts and were ship-rigged. To reduce drag and improve performance under sail, they could hoist their propellers into the hull and retract the telescoping funnel.

The Renown-class ships were armed with 91 muzzle-loading, smoothbore guns that consisted of thirty-four 8 in (203 mm) shell guns on their lower gun deck and thirty-six 32-pounder (56 cwt) guns (Note: "Cwt" is the abbreviation for hundredweight, 56 cwt referring to the weight of the gun.) on their upper gun deck. Between the forecastle and quarterdeck, the Renowns carried twenty 32-pounder (45 cwt) guns. The single 68-pounder gun was positioned on the forecastle as a pivot gun so that it could serve as a bow chaser.

== Ships ==
Construction data
Ship	Builder	Ordered	Laid down	Launched	Completed	Fate
Renown	HM Dockyard, Chatham	2 April 1853	20 December 1854	28 March 1857	20 February 1858	Sold to the North German Confederation, 24 March 1870; Scrapped, 1892
Revenge	HM Dockyard, Pembroke	2 April 1853	22 January 1854	16 April 1859	8 June 1861	Renamed Empress and converted into a training ship, March 1890; Sold for scrap, 31 December 1923
Atlas	HM Dockyard, Chatham	31 March 1855	23 February 1858	21 July 1860	1861?	Scrapped, 1904
Anson	HM Dockyard, Woolwich	31 March 1855	1 October 1858	15 September 1860	1860?	Sold for scrap, April 1904

== Bibliography ==
- Gröner, Erich; Jung, Dieter & Maass, Martin (1988). Die deutschen Kriegsschiffe 1815–1945 [German Warships 1815–1945] (in German). Vol. 5: Hilfschiffe II: Lazarettschiffe, Wohnschiffe, Schulschiffe, Forschungsfahrzeuge, Hafenbetriebesfahrzeuge (I). Bernard & Graefe. ISBN 3-7637-4804-0.
- Lambert, Andrew D. (1984). Battleships in Transition: The Creation of the Steam Battlefleet 1815-1860. Conway Maritime Press. ISBN 0-85177-315-X.
- Warlow, B. (2000) [1992]. Shore Establishments of the Royal Navy (Revised and enlarged ed.). Maritime Books. ISBN 0-907771-73-4.
- Winfield, Rif (2014). British Warships in the Age of Sail 1817–1863: Design, Construction, Careers and Fates. Seaforth Publishing. ISBN 978-1-84832-169-4.
