= HMS Brunswick (1855) =

Ship of the line of the Royal Navy

Class overview
- Name: Brunswick
- Operators: Royal Navy
- Preceded by: Renown class
- Succeeded by: HMS Defiance
- Built: 1847–1856
- In service: 1856–1860
- Completed: 1
- Scrapped: 1

History

United Kingdom
- Name: Brunswick
- Ordered: 19 February 1844
- Builder: HM Dockyard, Pembroke
- Laid down: August 1847
- Launched: 1 June 1855
- Completed: 27 June 1855
- Commissioned: 20 December 1855
- Fate: Sold for scrap, March 1867

General characteristics (as built)
- Class & type: 80-gun, second rate, ship of the line
- Displacement: 3,632 long tons (3,690 t)
- Tons burthen: 2,491 84/94 bm
- Length: 190 ft (57.9 m) (gun deck)
- Beam: 55 ft 10 in (17 m)
- Draught: 24 ft 6 in (7.5 m)
- Depth of hold: 23 ft 4 in (7.1 m)
- Installed power: Boilers; 1,438 ihp (1,072 kW)
- Propulsion: 1 screw; 1 single-expansion steam engine
- Sail plan: Full-rigged ship
- Speed: 7.8 knots (14.4 km/h; 9.0 mph)
- Complement: 860
- Armament: 80 muzzle-loading, smoothbore guns: Lower deck: 10 × 8 in (203 mm) shell guns + 18 × 32 pdr guns; Upper deck: 4 × 8 in shell guns + 24 × 32 pounders; Quarter deck & Forecastle: 24 × 32 pdrs

HMS Brunswick was an 80-gun, second rate, modified Vanguard-class ship of the line built for the Royal Navy (RN) during the 1850s. She was converted to screw propulsion while still under construction. Completed in 1856, the ship was intended to serve with the Baltic Fleet during the Crimean War of 1854–1856 against the Russian Empire, but the war ended before she was finished; Brunswick was assigned to the Mediterranean Fleet instead. She was transferred to the North American and West Indies Station in 1857, to the Channel Squadron the following year and back to the Mediterranean Fleet in 1859. The ship was paid off in 1860 and sold for scrap seven years later.

== Background and description ==
The Vanguard class was designed by the Surveyor of the Navy, William Symonds, with an emphasis on sailing qualities, rather than battle efficiency as they had a quick roll in poor weather that made them bad gun platforms. Brunswick was modified with less beam and a fuller midsection by Symonds in 1847. The ship would have measured 190 feet (57.9 m) at the gun deck and 155 feet 5 inches (47.4 m) at the keel. She would have had a beam of 55 feet 9 inches (17 m), a depth of hold of 23 feet 4 inches (7.1 m) and had a tonnage of 2,484 27/94 tons burthen. Her crew would have numbered 750 officers and ratings. The ship had the usual three-masted full-ship rig. Her muzzle-loading, smoothbore armament was intended to consist of eight 8 in (203 mm) shell guns and twenty 32-pounder guns on the lower gun deck and four 8-inch shell guns and twenty-four 32-pounder guns on the upper gun deck. Between her forecastle and quarterdeck, she would have carried twenty-four more 32-pounder guns.

=== Screw conversion ===
Despite the Anglo-French alliance during the on-going Crimean War, Captain Baldwin Wake Walker, the new Surveyor of the Navy, still believed that France was still Britain's primary naval rival. As part of his plan to counter large the number of French screw ships of the line under construction, he ordered Brunswick, while still under construction, to be converted into a screw-propelled ship in 1854. As apart of the conversion, the ship's mid-section was to be filled out. Brunswick's measurements did not significantly change after the conversion. The ship displaced 3,632 long tons (3,690 t), had a draught of 25 feet 3 inches (7.7 m) and her crew increased to 750 officers and ratings. She was fitted with a 400-nominal horsepower, single-expansion steam engine built by Miller, Ravenhill & Co. Her boilers produced enough steam that the two-cylinder, horizontal engine produced 1,438 indicated horsepower (1,072 kW) which gave the ship a speed of 7.8 knots (14.4 km/h; 9.0 mph) during her sea trials off Plymouth on 29 March 1856.

Brunswick's lower gun deck armament consisted of ten 65 cwt, (Note: "Cwt" is the abbreviation for hundredweight, 65 cwt referring to the weight of the gun.) 8-inch shell guns and eighteen 32-pounder (56 cwt) guns. The upper gun deck had four 8-inch shell guns and twenty-four 32-pounders of 50 cwt. The combined armament of the forecastle and quarterdeck totalled twenty-four 42 cwt 32-pounders.

== Construction and career ==
Named after the Prussian Field Marshal, Charles William Ferdinand, Duke of Brunswick who was married to the sister of George III, Brunswick was the third ship of her name to serve in the RN. Ordered on 19 February 1844, the ship was laid down at HM Dockyard, Pembroke, in August 1847, but was reordered as a screw-propelled ship on 23 June 1854. Work began on 7 August and she was launched on 1 June 1855. The ship was commissioned on 20 December by Captain Hastings Yelverton and completed on 2 April 1856 at HM Dockyard, Devonport. The Board of Admiralty had intended for her to serve as a partially disarmed depot ship commanding a division of gunboats during the 1856 campaign planned for the Baltic Sea, but this was forestalled by the Treaty of Paris that ended the war being signed in March.

Yelverton was relieved by Captain Harry Broadbent on 12 July and the ship was assigned to the Mediterranean Fleet. Broadbent was relieved in his turn by Captain Erasmus Ommanney on 22 October 1857 and the ship was transferred to the North American and West Indies Station. While based at Colón, Gran Colombia, Ommanney had to deal with the American filibuster William Walker. The following year, Brunswick served with the Channel Squadron and then she rejoined the Mediterranean Fleet in 1859. She returned home to be paid off in 2 March 1860. The ship was refitted in July–August for the Steam Reserve. Brunswick's armament was reduced to 68 guns three years later and then to 60 guns in 1866. The ship was sold to Marshall in March 1867 to be broken up for scrap.
