= PS Castalia =

British paddle steamer (1874–1905)

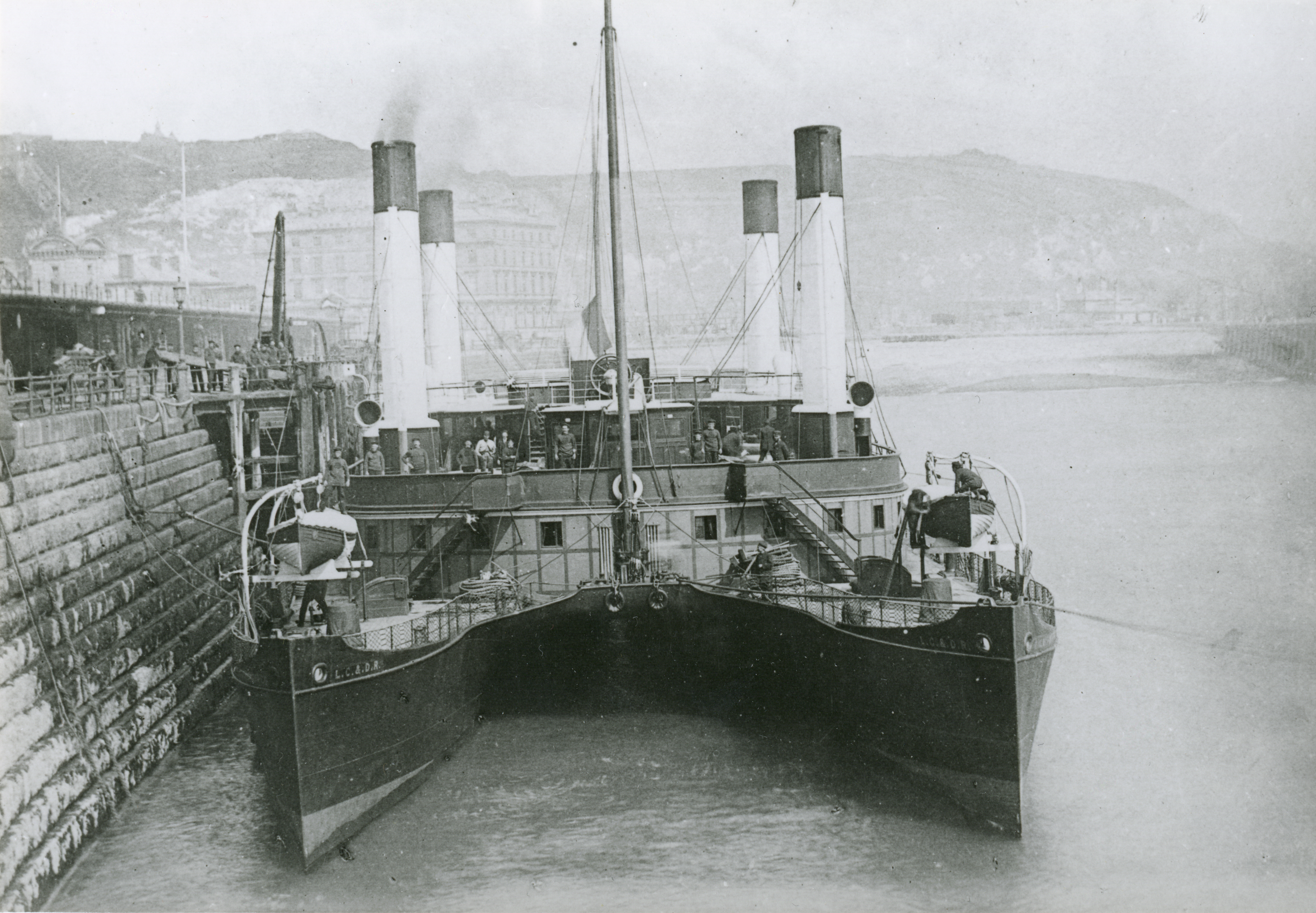
- Castalia in Dover, 1881

History

United Kingdom
- Name: Castalia
- Owner: English Channel Steamship Company (1874–78); London, Chatham & Dover Railway (1878–84); Metropolitan Asylums Board (1884–1904)
- Operator: English Channel Steamship Company (1874–76); Metropolitan Asylums Board (1884–1904)
- Port of registry: (United Kingdom of Great Britain and Ireland) United Kingdom
- Builder: Thames Ironworks and Shipbuilding Company
- Cost: £70,000
- Launched: 2 June 1874
- Completed: October 1874
- In service: 1874
- Out of service: 1876–84
- Fate: Scrapped 1905

General characteristics
- Type: Paddle steamer (1874–83); Hospital ship (1884–1904)
- Tonnage: 1,533 GRT
- Length: 295 ft 6 in (90.07 m)
- Beam: 60 ft 6 in (18.44 m)
- Draught: 7 ft 2 in (2.18 m)
- Installed power: 2 x 140 hp (100 kW)
- Propulsion: Twin compound steam engines, two paddle wheels
- Speed: 11 knots (20 km/h)
- Capacity: 700 passengers

Castalia^{[Note A]} was a paddle steamer built in London in 1874. She was a 1,533 GRT twin-hulled paddle steamer built by the Thames Ironworks and Shipbuilding Company, Leamouth, London for the English Channel Steamship Company. She was acquired by the London, Chatham and Dover Railway (LCDR) in 1878 but had already been laid up by then and was not operated by the LCDR. In 1883, she was sold to the Metropolitan Asylums Board and converted to a hospital ship. She served until 1904 and was scrapped in 1905.

== Description ==
Castalia was a twin-hulled paddle steamer, comprising two half-hulls with a length of 295 feet 6 inches (90.07 m) and a beam of 60 feet 6 inches (18.44 m). The two half-hulls were 26 feet (7.9 m) apart internally. Her draught was 7 feet 2 inches (2.18 m). The ship was designed with bows forward and astern in order to avoid the need to turn round at Calais, France.

She was propelled by two diagonal compound steam engines, of 140 horsepower (100 kW) each, driving a single paddle wheel. The engines were built by J & A Blyth, London. The two paddle wheels were placed side by side between the twin hulls. These could propel her at 11 knots (20 km/h). Following improvements in 1875, the boilers and paddle wheels were by Maudslay, Sons, & Field, Lambeth, Surrey. She had capacity to carry 700 passengers.

== History ==
=== Construction as an unconventional cross-Channel ferry ===
Castalia was built in 1874 by the Thames Ironworks and Shipbuilding Company, Leamouth for the English Channel Steamship Company. Costing about £70,000 to build, she was designed by a Captain Dicey, who thought that she should be more stable therefore leading to less seasickness for her passengers. Castalia was launched on 2 June. She was named for Lady Granville, who launched her.

==== Underpowered and uneconomically slow ====
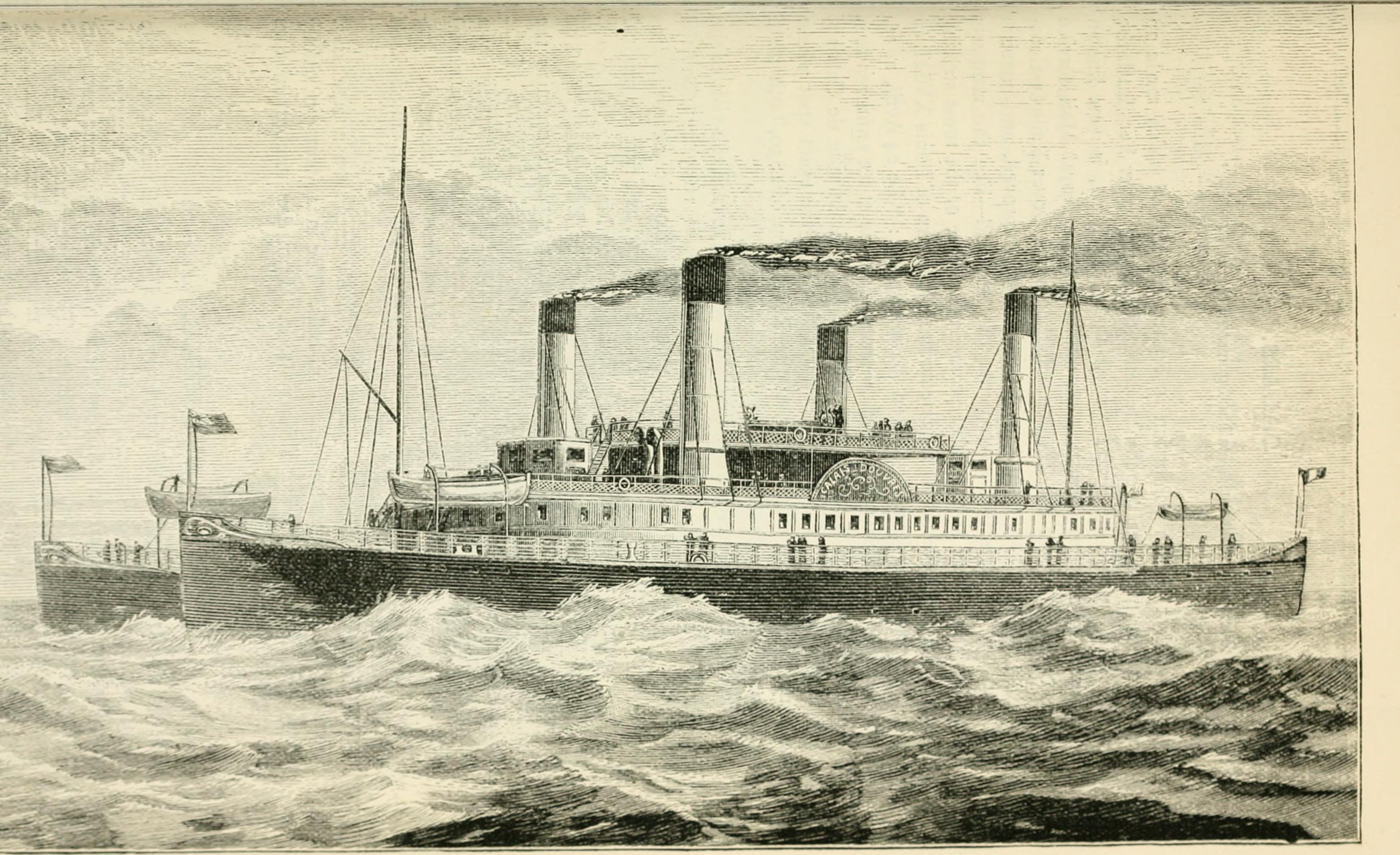
Another view of Castalia

Completed in October, trials soon showed that she was too slow. Castalia was returned to her makers for new boilers and paddles to be fitted. A debenture of £16,000 being sought by the English Channel Steamship Company to finance the improvements. On her delivery voyage from Gravesend, Kent to Dover on 15 September 1874, trouble was experienced with priming of her boilers, necessitating a reduction to half-power, although a speed of 10 knots (19 km/h) was attained. On arrival at Dover, large crowds came to see the novel ship. Castalia made a trial run between Dover and Calais on 21 July 1875. The voyage had begun at Gravesend with the intention that she would sail to Calais, but the Board of Trade inspector on board ordered her into Dover as she approached the North Foreland. A protruding bolt on the Admiralty Pier at Dover caused some minor damage, which was quickly repaired. Although her steering gear had failed, there was no difficulty in manoeuvering the ship, attributed to the fact that the engines drove each paddle wheel independently. Castalia then made the crossing to Calais. She made a public trial crossing of the Channel on 2 August. The Times commented that she was underpowered, having 280 horsepower (210 kW) for a gross register tonnage of 1,533. Mailboats then in service had 160 horsepower (120 kW) for a tonnage of 400 GRT.

Castalia entered into regular service on 5 August 1875. She departed from Dover at 09:35, arriving in time for passengers to catch the 12:30 train to Paris. She departed from Calais at 13:20, allowing passengers from the Continent to arrive at London that evening. She operated daily except Sundays. Fares were 8s 6d first class, 6s 6d second class. Private cabins were available at £1 extra and refreshments were available on board. Her lack of speed meant that she could not operate in connection with mail trains and she was not a success financially. Only capable of 11 knots (20 km/h), she needed to be able to achieve at least 12 knots (22 km/h) to be as fast as ships then in service on the cross-channel route, and 13 knots (24 km/h) to be able to provide the required service. It had been hoped that Castalia would be able to achieve 14 knots (26 km/h).

==== Illustrious passengers ====
Following his unsuccessful attempt at swimming across the English Channel on 12 August 1875, Matthew Webb returned to the United Kingdom on board Castalia. Following the successful swim across the Channel on 24 August, he again returned to the United Kingdom on board Castalia. Reaction from passengers who sailed on board Castiliâ was generally favourable. Castalia was reported to only roll by about 5° to port and starboard in heavy seas, whereas a conventional ship would roll by 15° or more. In identical conditions, Foam was reported to have taken 1 hour 42 minutes for a crossing from Calais to Dover, pitching and rolling heavily, whereas Castalia took three hours, but with little pitching and rolling. On 11 October, the Prince of Wales travelled on board Castalia as part of his journey from London to India. The prince chose Castalia as he was prone to seasickness. He was accompanied from London to Calais by the Princess of Wales, who slept on board Castalia after arrival at Calais and returned to Dover the next day.

==== An improved successor ====
In January 1876, the board of the English Channel Steamship Company agreed to an issue of £150,000 of shares paying a dividend of 7% in order to finance an improved version of Castalia. The new ship was to be capable of 14 knots (26 km/h). The new ship was the Express, which was built by Hawthorn, Leslie & Co Ltd, Hebburn-on-Tyne, Northumberland. Express was renamed Calais-Douvres before entering service with the LCDR.

==== Political manoeuvres ====
It was reported that for each of the months from August to November, an increase of the average number of passengers carried per day was recorded, from 38 in August to 159 in November. In March, the South Eastern Railway Bill had its second reading in Parliament. Sir Charles Russell, MP stated that the South Eastern Railway (SER) had done everything in its power to obstruct the English Channel Steamship Company. Lord Elcho stated that if the railway was sincere in its desire to improve communication with the continent (the stated aim of the bill), then it would run its trains to suit Castalia, rather than expecting the ship to run to suit its trains. After some discussion, the bill passed its second reading. Sir Edward Watkin was asked about this state of affairs at a shareholders meeting of the SER on 3 August. He replied that the railway could not run a special and regular service of trains to meet an irregular sailing schedule such as that operated by Castalia, which did not run in the winter. The boats that connected with the SERs trains operated a regular, year-round service.

==== Modifications, further trials, and end of ferry career ====
Having been withdrawn for further modifications and improvements, Castalia re-entered service on 3 June 1876. The average number of passengers using Castalia increased from 1,741 in June to 2,933 in July and 5,388 in August. In March 1877, Castalia was fitted with new paddle wheels. These only had twelve paddles against the 32 of the original wheels. Although her boilers were priming, an increase in speed of 2 knots (3.7 km/h) was achieved compared against similar power settings for the old paddle wheels. Although the trial was declared a success, Castalia was withdrawn from service. She was laid up on Galleons Reach on the River Thames, at Erith, Kent.

The English Channel Steamship Company was wound up by order of the Court of Chancery following a petition from Castalia's builders. The ship being the only asset owned by the company and it was mortgaged to her builders for £20,000. In 1878, the English Channel Steamship Company was acquired by the LCDR, and Castalia was one of the ships that LCDR acquired. A further four-hour trial run was made on 17 August 1878 when Castalia sailed from North Woolwich, having been laid up for seventeen months. Speed was reduced due to her bottom being fouled and her steam engines not having been in use during that time. Following the Princess Alice disaster on 3 September 1878, the Board of Trade held an enquiry. One of the recommendations was that ships that were laid up, such as Atlas and Castalia should be either moved to different locations or moored nearer the river bank, leaving a wider area of the river available for navigation. On 24 October, Castalia rescued the captain of Ruth, which had sunk in the River Thames during a squall.

=== Reconstruction as an unconventional hospital ship ===
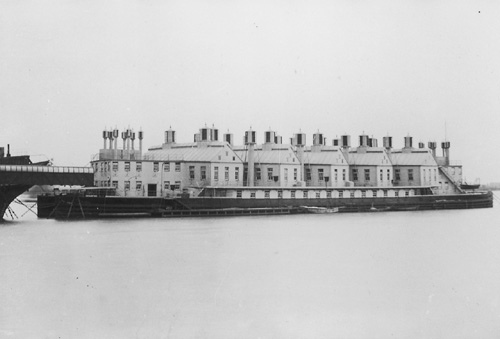
Castalia as converted to a hospital ship, with the stern of Endymion at left

In September 1881, Castalia was advertised to be sold the following month on the instructions of the mortgagees, Messrs Bailey & Ridley. The sale was advertised as taking place at the Captain's Room of the Royal Exchange, London on 20 October 1881. In May 1883, Castalia was sold to the Metropolitan Asylums Board for £5,500 and converted to a hospital ship with provision for 150 patients. She was converted at a cost of between £30,000 and £35,000. Castalia joined the board's two other ships, Atlas and Endymion at Long Reach, near Dartford. Her engines and paddle wheels were removed and the void covered over to form a deck, The machinery that was removed was advertised for sale in July 1883. Five ward blocks were built at an oblique angle on her twin hulls. This was to ensure a flow of air through the wards. Male patients were housed on board Atlas and female patients on board Castalia; with Endymion serving as an administration and stores ship. Ventilation was by a number of Boyle's self-acting ventilators, which removed 1,200 cubic feet (34 m^{3}) of air per minute from the ship. A pump provided an artificial draught in times of calm. The ventilators could change the air in the wards nine times per hour. Castalia entered service as a hospital ship in June 1884. In 1885, it was reported that a child born on board the ship had been named Castalia.

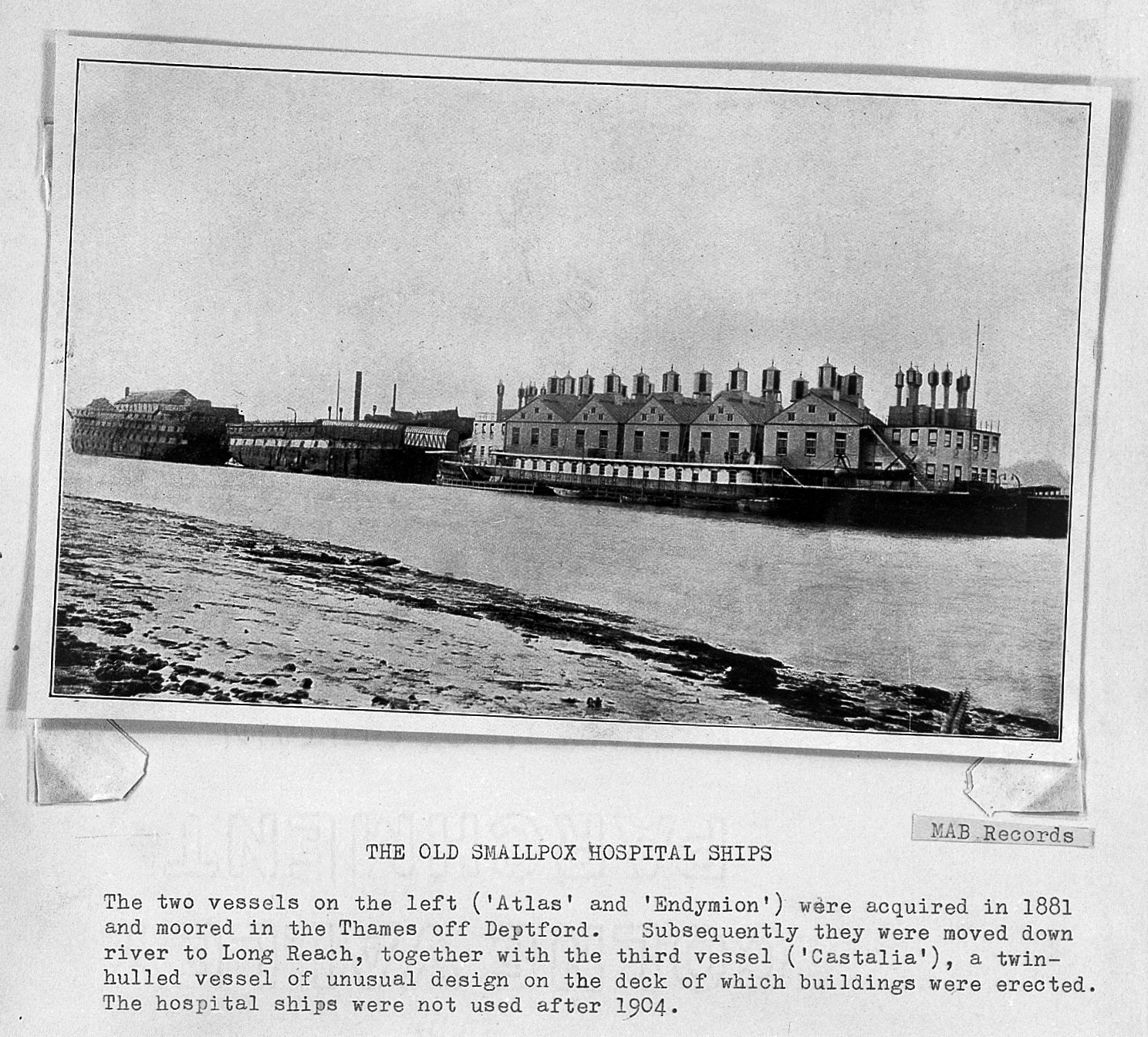
The old smallpox hospital ships; Atlas, Endymion and Castalia

On 9 December 1898, SS Barrowmore was in collision with Castalia. Some of the patients jumped overboard. Castalia had to be dry docked for repairs. The three ships served until 1904, when the new Joyce Green Hospital opened at Dartford, Kent. In December 1904, she was sold by auction at the Bull Hotel, Dartford, Kent, for breaking. Castalia sold for £1,120. Along with Atlas and Endymion, a total of £8,045 was realised. The ships were to be removed within two months or a rental of £25 per week would then be payable.

== See also ==
- List of multihulls

== Notes ==
1. The ship's name was sometimes spelled "Castaliâ", but most sources spelled it "Castalia".
