= Hastings Yelverton =

Royal Navy Admiral (1804-1878)

Admiral Sir Hastings Yelverton GCB
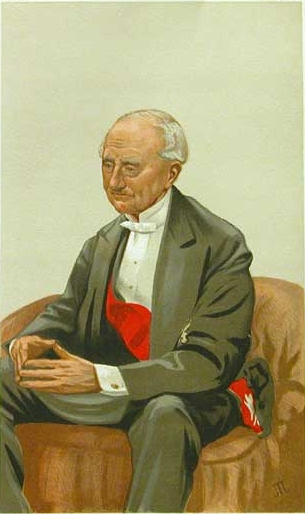
- As depicted by James Tissot in Vanity Fair, June 1877. Caption read "Spanish Ironclads"
- Born: Hastings Reginald Henry; 8 March 1808; Kildare, Ireland
- Died: 24 July 1878 (aged 70); Bath, Somerset
- Military career
- Allegiance: United Kingdom
- Branch: Royal Navy
- Service years: 1823–1877
- Rank: Admiral
- Commands: First Naval Lord; Mediterranean Fleet; Channel Squadron; HMS Conqueror; HMS Brunswick; HMS Arrogant; HMS Aigle; HMS Queen
- Conflicts: Portuguese Civil War; Crimean War; Cantonal Revolution
- Awards: Knight Grand Cross of the Order of the Bath

Admiral Sir Hastings Reginald Yelverton, GCB (born Hastings Reginald Henry; 21 March 1808 – 24 July 1878) was a Royal Navy officer. As a junior officer he took part in a major action against pirates off Candia in June 1826 and was involved in protecting British interests during the Portuguese Civil War during the early 1830s. He saw action in the Crimean War as Captain of one of the two ships that captured a Russian barque beneath the batteries at Ekenäs in Finland in May 1854. Then in July 1873 he took part in the suppression of the Cantonal Revolution in Cartagena. He became First Naval Lord in September 1876 and in that role implemented a series of economies demanded by the Disraeli ministry but was also involved in ordering the small, cheap and thoroughly unsuccessful ironclad Ajax-class battleships.

== Early career ==
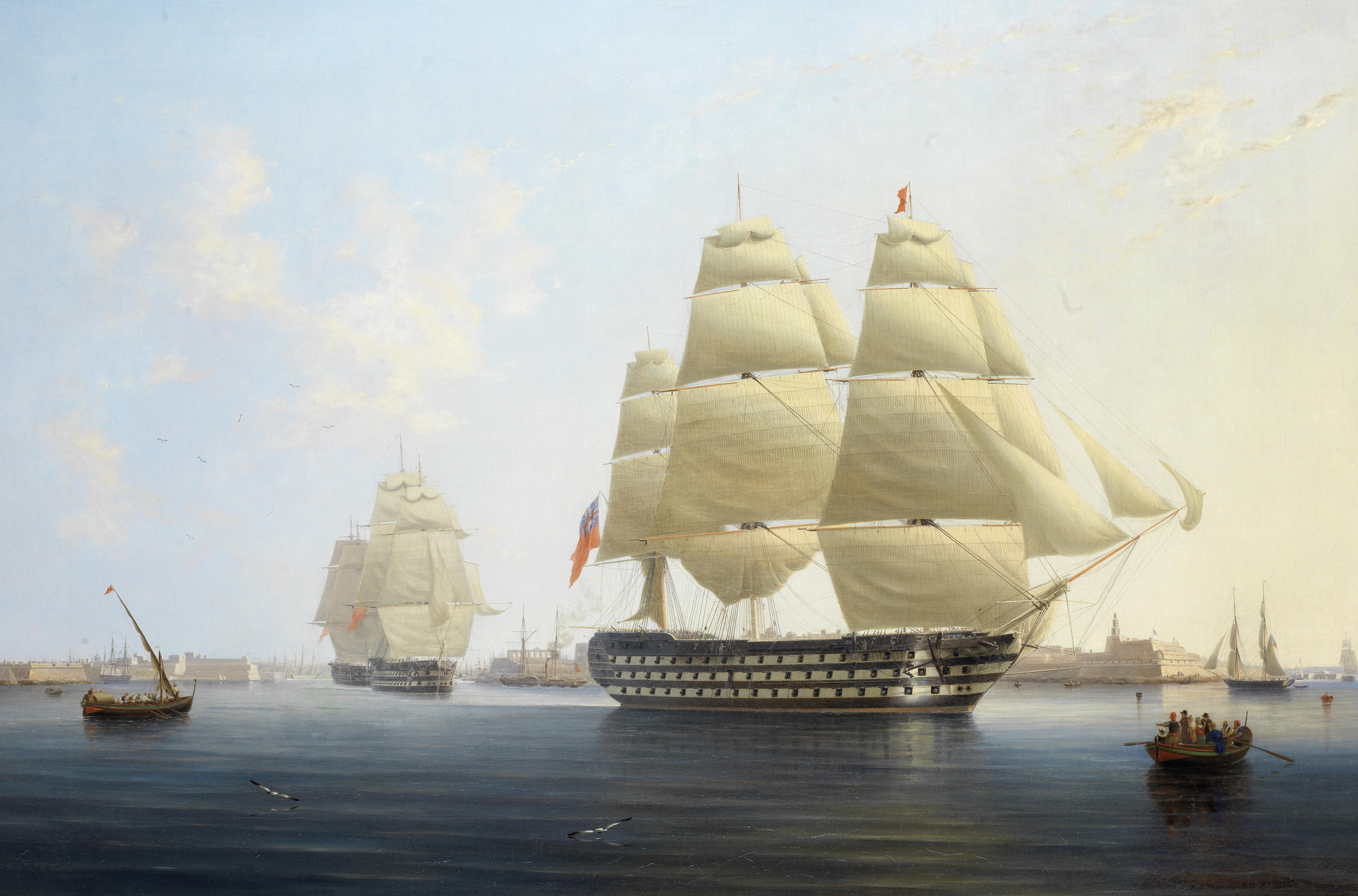
The first-rate HMS Queen which Yelverton commanded

Born the son of John Joseph Henry (of Straffan) and Lady Emily Elizabeth FitzGerald (daughter of William FitzGerald, 2nd Duke of Leinster), Hastings Henry, as he then was, entered the Royal Navy as a first-class volunteer aboard the frigate HMS Sibylle in the Mediterranean Fleet in 1823. He took part in a major action against pirates off Candia in June 1826 and subsequently served as a midshipman and mate in the brig HMS Columbine, the frigate HMS Undaunted and then the battleship HMS St Vincent in home waters.

Promoted lieutenant on 18 December 1830, Henry was posted to the second-rate HMS Asia, flagship of Sir William Parker, in September 1831. HMS Asia was then based at Lisbon, protecting British interests during the Portuguese Civil War. He joined the sixth-rate HMS Rattlesnake on the East Indies Station in December 1834. Promoted to commander on 28 June 1838, he joined the sloop HMS Styx at Sheerness in August 1841 and then took command of the sloop Devastation in the Mediterranean Fleet in September 1841. He became acting captain of the first-rate HMS Queen in the Mediterranean Fleet in May 1842 and acting captain of the fifth-rate HMS Aigle also in the Mediterranean Fleet in April 1843. He was promoted to captain on 5 September 1843 and, following his marriage to Barbara Rawdon-Hastings, Marchioness of Hastings (born Barbara Yelverton), assumed the surname of Yelverton on 3 January 1849.

== Crimean service ==
Yelverton was given command of the steam screw frigate HMS Arrogant in October 1853 and saw service in the Crimean War. In May 1854, HMS Arrogant and the steam screw frigate HMS Hecla captured a Russian barque beneath the batteries at Ekenäs in Finland. Throughout much on 1855, Yelverton with HMS Arrogant and HMS Magicienne operated independently destroying Ruotsinsalmi sea fortress and Svartholm fortress, and was appointed a Companion of the Order of the Bath for his services on 5 July 1855. In December 1856, he took command of the second-rate HMS Brunswick and a gunboat flotilla for further operations but the Crimean War ended before he saw any action. He went on to be captain of the first-rate HMS Conqueror in the Mediterranean Fleet in July 1856 and comptroller-general of the coastguard in July 1859.

== Higher command ==
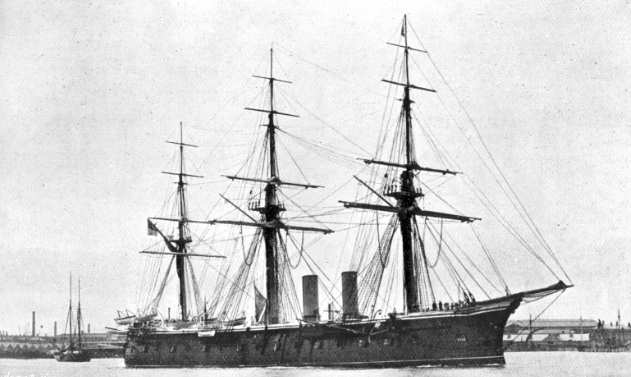
The armoured frigate HMS Lord Warden, flagship of the Mediterranean Fleet, which Yelverton commanded in the early 1870s

Promoted rear admiral on 30 January 1863, Yelverton became second-in-command of the Mediterranean Station, hoisting his flag in the second-rate HMS Revenge in June 1863 and then, from May 1865, in the broadside ironclad HMS Caledonia.

He went on to be Commander-in-Chief of the Channel Squadron in June 1866, and having been promoted to vice admiral on 29 May 1869, he was appointed by Hugh Childers, then First Lord of the Admiralty, to a committee to consider the new turret ship design. He was elevated to Knight Commander of the Order of the Bath on 2 June 1869. He was again given command of the Channel Squadron in July 1870 and then became Commander-in-Chief, Mediterranean Fleet, hoisting his flag in the battleship HMS Lord Warden, in October 1870.

In July 1873, he took part in the suppression of the Cantonal Revolution in Cartagena. He was advanced to Knight Grand Cross of the Order of the Bath on 29 May 1875 and promoted to full admiral on 30 July 1875.

Yelverton, by now suffering from deafness, became First Naval Lord in September 1876 after Sir Geoffrey Hornby refused the post. In that role Yelverton implemented a series of economies demanded by the Disraeli ministry but was also involved in ordering the small, cheap and thoroughly unsuccessful ironclad Ajax-class battleships. Due to failing health, Yelverton resigned in November 1877 and died at the Grand Pump Hotel in Bath on 24 July 1878.

== Family ==
Yelverton married the widowed Barbara Rawdon-Hastings, Marchioness of Hastings, who was suo jure Barbara Yelverton, 20th Baroness Grey de Ruthyn (d. 1858) on 9 April 1845; their only child was born shortly thereafter - Hon. Barbara Yelverton (12 January 1849 – 1 October 1924), who married the John Yarde-Buller, 2nd Baron Churston.

== See also ==
- O'Byrne, William Richard (1849). "Henry, Hastings Reginald" . A Naval Biographical Dictionary . John Murray – via Wikisource.

== Sources ==
- William Loney RN Career History

Military offices
Preceded by Sir Sydney Dacres	Commander-in-Chief, Channel Squadron; 1866–1867	Succeeded by Frederick Warden
Preceded by Sir Thomas Symonds	Commander-in-Chief, Channel Squadron; July 1870–October 1870	Succeeded by Sir George Wellesley
Preceded by Sir Alexander Milne	Commander-in-Chief, Mediterranean Fleet; 1870–1874	Succeeded by Sir James Drummond
Preceded by Sir Alexander Milne	First Naval Lord; 1876–1877	Succeeded by Sir George Wellesley
