= HMS Hero (1858) =

Ship of the line of the Royal Navy

History

United Kingdom
- Name: Hero
- Ordered: 27 March 1852
- Builder: Chatham Dockyard
- Laid down: 8 June 1854
- Launched: 15 April 1858
- Completed: 10 May 1859
- Decommissioned: 22 November 1862
- Fate: Sold for scrap, 20 June 1871

General characteristics (as built)
- Class & type: 91-gun second-rate Agamemnon-class ship of the line
- Displacement: 4,765 long tons (4,841 t)
- Tons burthen: 3,148 30/94 bm
- Length: 234 ft 4 in (71.4 m) (gun deck)
- Beam: 55 ft 4 in (16.9 m)
- Draught: 24 ft 6 in (7.5 m)
- Depth of hold: 24 ft 6 in (7.5 m)
- Installed power: 2,662 ihp (1,985 kW)
- Propulsion: 1 screw; 1 single-expansion steam engine
- Sail plan: Full-rigged ship
- Speed: 11.7 knots (21.7 km/h; 13.5 mph) (trials)
- Complement: 860
- Armament: 91 muzzle-loading, smoothbore guns: Lower deck: 34 × 8 in (203 mm) shell guns; Upper deck: 34 × 32 pdrs; Quarter deck & Forecastle: 22 × 32 pdrs; 1 × 68 pdr

HMS Hero was a 91-gun, second-rate, screw-powered, modified Agamemnon-class ship of the line built for the Royal Navy during the 1850s. Completed in 1859, she initially served with the Channel Squadron and then conveyed Edward, Prince of Wales, to North America in 1860. The ship spent most of 1862 at the North America and West Indies Station before being paid off towards the end of the year. Hero was sold for scrap in 1871.

== Description ==
The Agamemnon-class ships of the line were built in response to the perceived threat from France by the construction of the steam-powered Napoléon-class ships of the line. Hero's design was modified by the Surveyor of the Navy, Baldwin Wake Walker, by lengthening her keel by 4 feet (1.2 m) and fining the lines of her bow with respect to her half-sisters. The ship measured 234 feet 4 inches (71.4 m) on the gundeck and 199 feet 3 inches (60.7 m) on the keel. She had a beam of 55 feet 4 inches (16.9 m), a depth of hold of 24 feet 6 inches (7.5 m), a deep draught of 24 feet 6 inches (7.47 m). Hero displaced 4,765 long tons (4,841 t) and had a tonnage of 3,148 30/94 tons burthen. The ship was fitted with a two-cylinder, single-expansion steam engine built by Maudslay, Sons and Field that was rated at 600 nominal horsepower and drove a single propeller shaft. During her sea trials on 5 November 1858, Hero's boilers provided enough steam for the engine to produce 2,662 indicated horsepower (1,985 kW) that was good for a speed of 11.7 knots (21.7 km/h; 13.5 mph). Her crew numbered 860 officers and ratings.

The ships had three masts and were ship-rigged. To reduce drag and improve performance under sail, the Agamemnons could hoist their propeller into the hull and retract the telescoping funnel. The ships were regarded as very manoeuverable for steamships, able to match sailing ships in their ability to tack and wear with precision.

The ships' muzzle-loading, smoothbore armament consisted of thirty-four 8 in (203 mm) shell guns on their lower gundeck and thirty-four 32-pounder (56 cwt) guns (Note: "Cwt" is the abbreviation for hundredweight, 56 cwt referring to the weight of the gun.) on their upper gundeck. Between their forecastle and quarterdeck, they carried twenty-two 32-pounder (45 cwt) guns. The single 68-pounder gun was positioned on the forecastle as a pivot gun so that it could serve as a bow chaser.

== Construction and career ==
Hero was the fourth ship of her name to serve in the Royal Navy. Unlike her half-sisters that had been ordered as 80-gun ships, she was ordered as a 91-gun ship on 27 March 1852. The ship was laid down at Chatham Dockyard on 8 June 1854 and launched on 15 April 1858. Hero was commissioned at Sheerness Dockyard by Captain George Broke. He was invalided out of the service on 29 April and replaced by Captain Henry Seymour. The ship completed on 10 May and was assigned to the Channel Squadron.

The ship was selected in 1860 to host the Prince of Wales during his tour of North America and she departed HM Dockyard, Devonport, on 12 July. His return was delayed by prolonged contrary winds and he did not arrive until 16 November, by which time, only one week's provisions remained and the royal party was reduced to eating salted beef and pork like the crew. Captain Alfred Ryder relieved Seymour on 5 January 1861 and the ship was transferred to the North America and West Indies Station. Hero was paid off at Sheerness on 22 November 1862. Her armament was reduced to 89 guns that same year, 79 guns during 1863–1869 and 71 guns until she was sold for scrap to Henry Castle & Sons on 20 June 1871 to be broken up at Charlton.
