= Pivot gun =

Type of cannon mounted on a fixed central emplacement

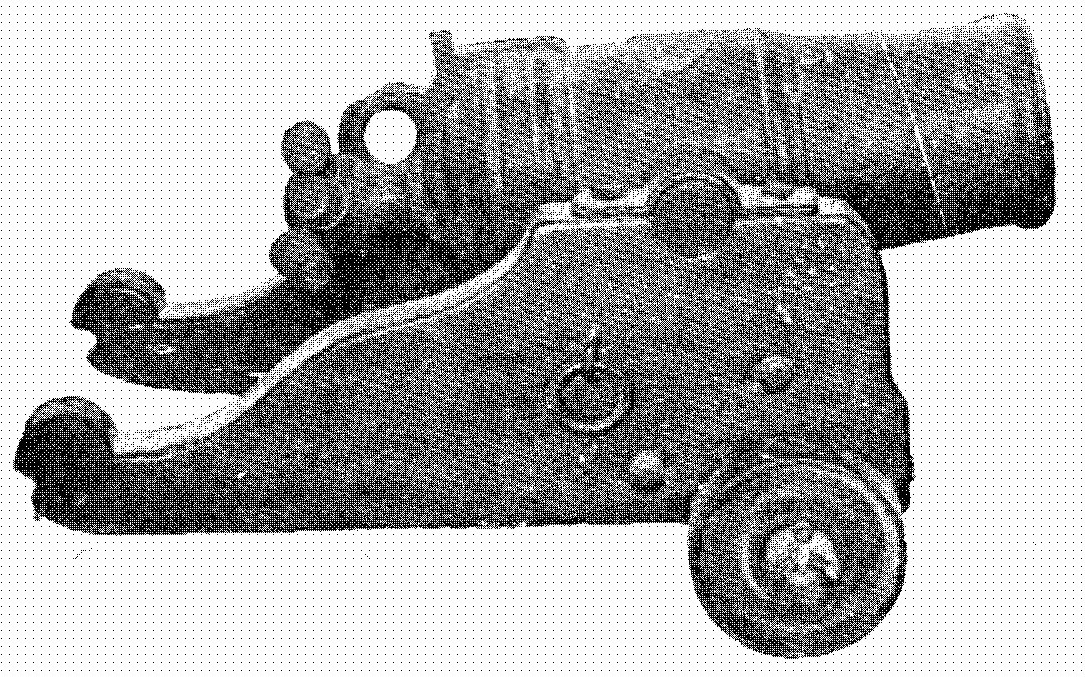
Pivot gun cannon belonging to Roberto Cofresí, a 19th-century Puerto Rican pirate

A pivot gun was a type of cannon mounted on a fixed central emplacement which permitted it to be moved through a wide horizontal arc. They were a common weapon aboard ships and in land fortifications for several centuries but became obsolete after the invention of gun turrets.

== History ==
By mounting a cannon on a pivot, a much wider arc of fire could be obtained than was possible with conventional carriage-mounted cannons. Unlike the latter, however, pivot guns were fixed in one place and could not easily be moved outside of their horizontal arc; they could thus only really be used in fixed positions such as in a fort or on a battleship.

There was no standard size of pivot gun, though they tended to be fairly substantial weapons. Like other cannons, they were usually muzzleloaders and could fire either shells or grapeshot (or other types of shot). Their calibers ranged from a few inches to the giant 11-inch Dahlgren guns used by the United States Navy in the mid-19th century.

Pivot guns had a major disadvantage in warfare: they were very difficult to protect in battle and were necessarily very exposed, as they lay close to the surface of a ship's deck and required an open field of view. In the late 19th century, large-caliber weapons were replaced by "disappearing guns" and ultimately by turrets, which enabled a broad arc of fire while providing the gunners with all-round protection from incoming fire. Smaller guns, particularly secondary batteries and the primary armament of cruisers and destroyers, retained pivot mountings until the 1920s, when turrets generally replaced them.

Pivot guns should not be confused with swivel guns, a much smaller type of ordnance.

== Gallery ==
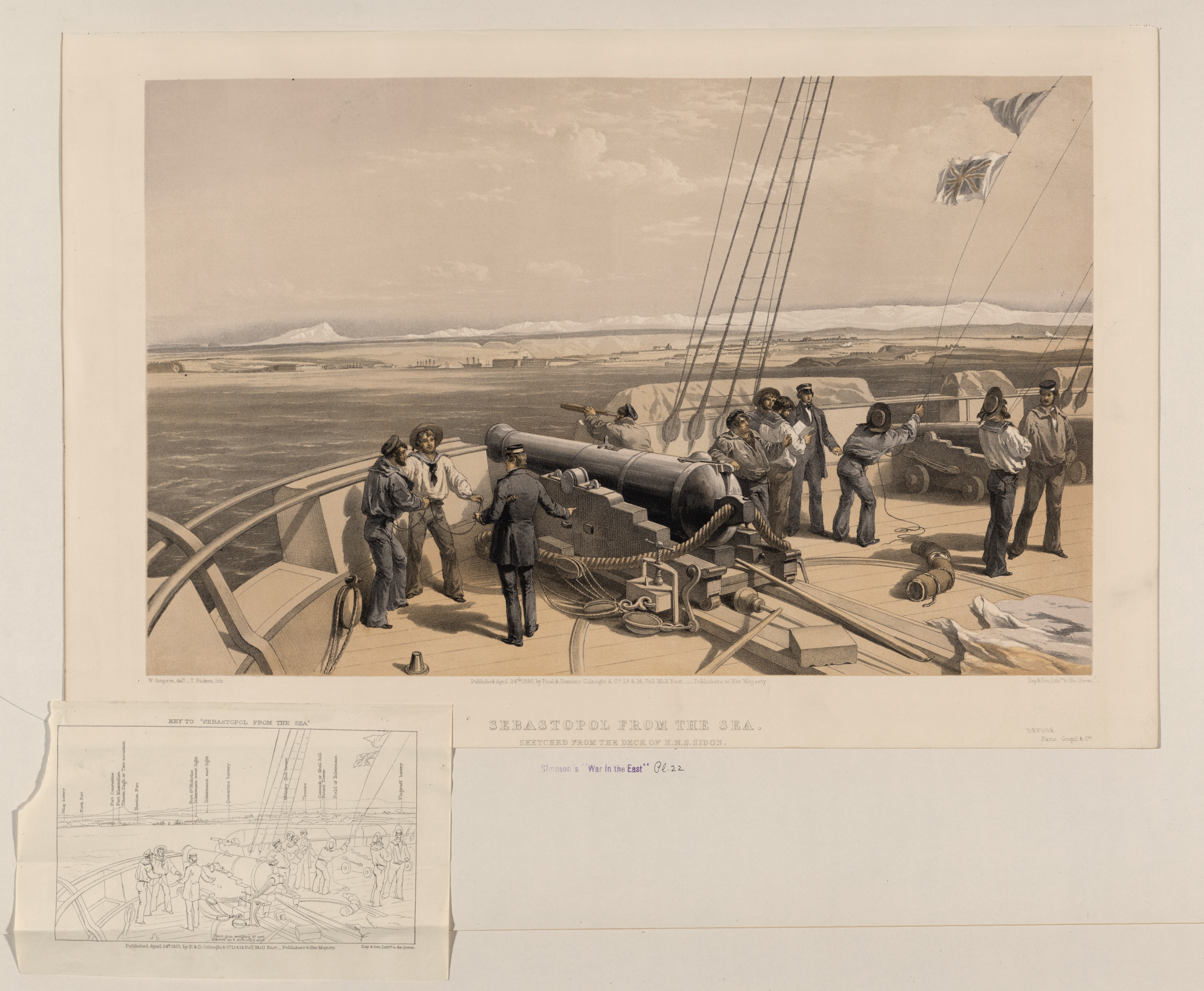
Sebastopol from the sea - sketched from the deck of HMS Sidon. The men are operating a 68-pounder 88 cwt smoothbore muzzle-loading gun.

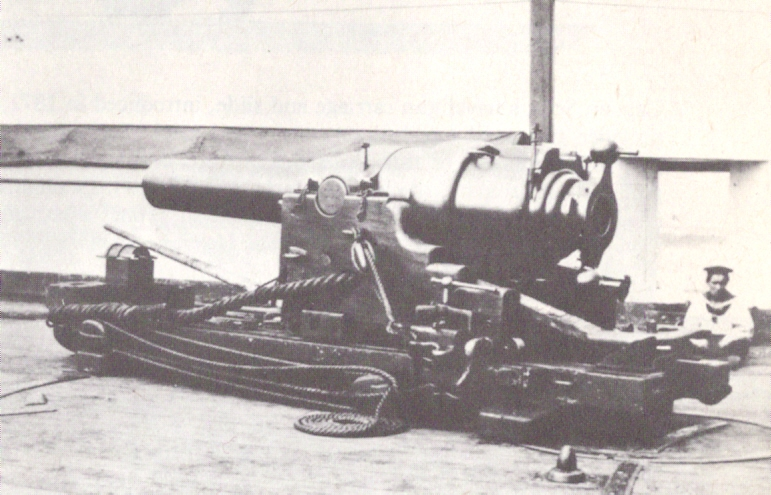
Armstrong 110-pounder rifled breech-loader mounted as a pivot gun on the forecastle of a Royal Navy ship

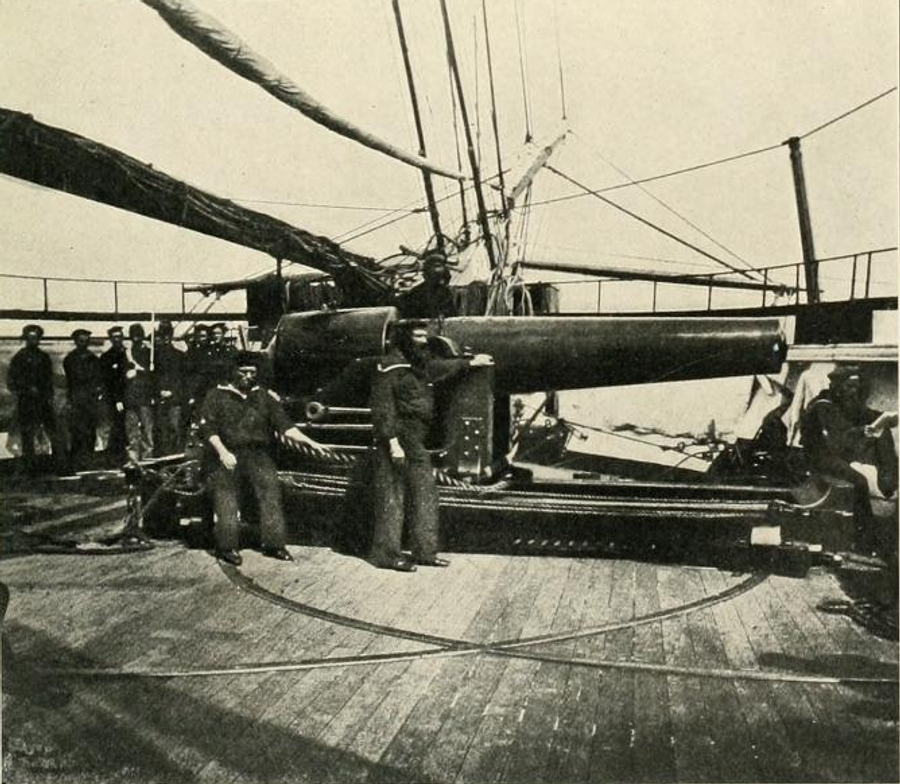
Pivot gun crew of USS Wabash

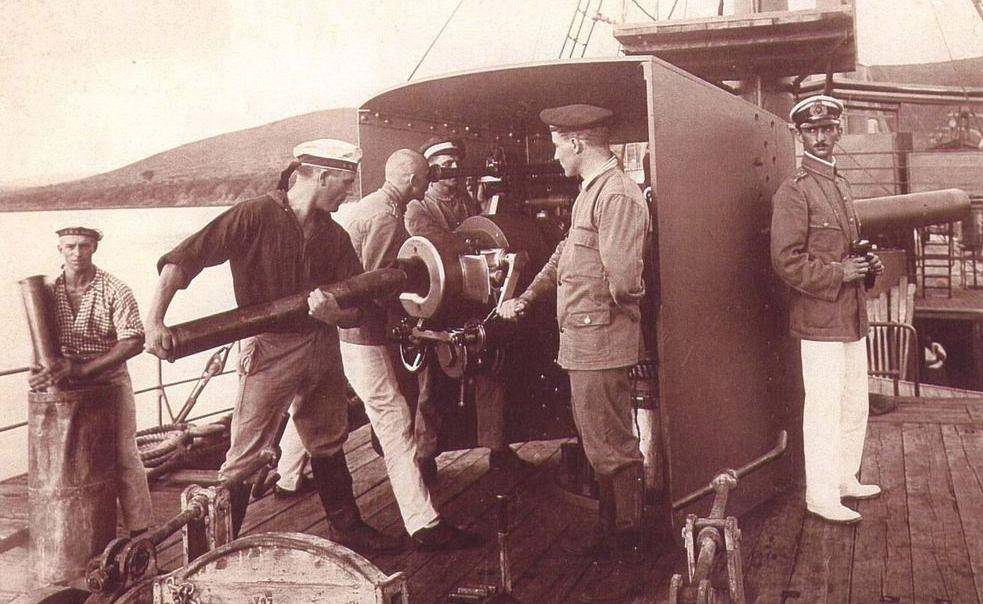
A 10.5 cm SK L/40 naval gun salvaged from the light cruiser Königsberg and mounted on the gunboat SS Graf von Götzen during World War I

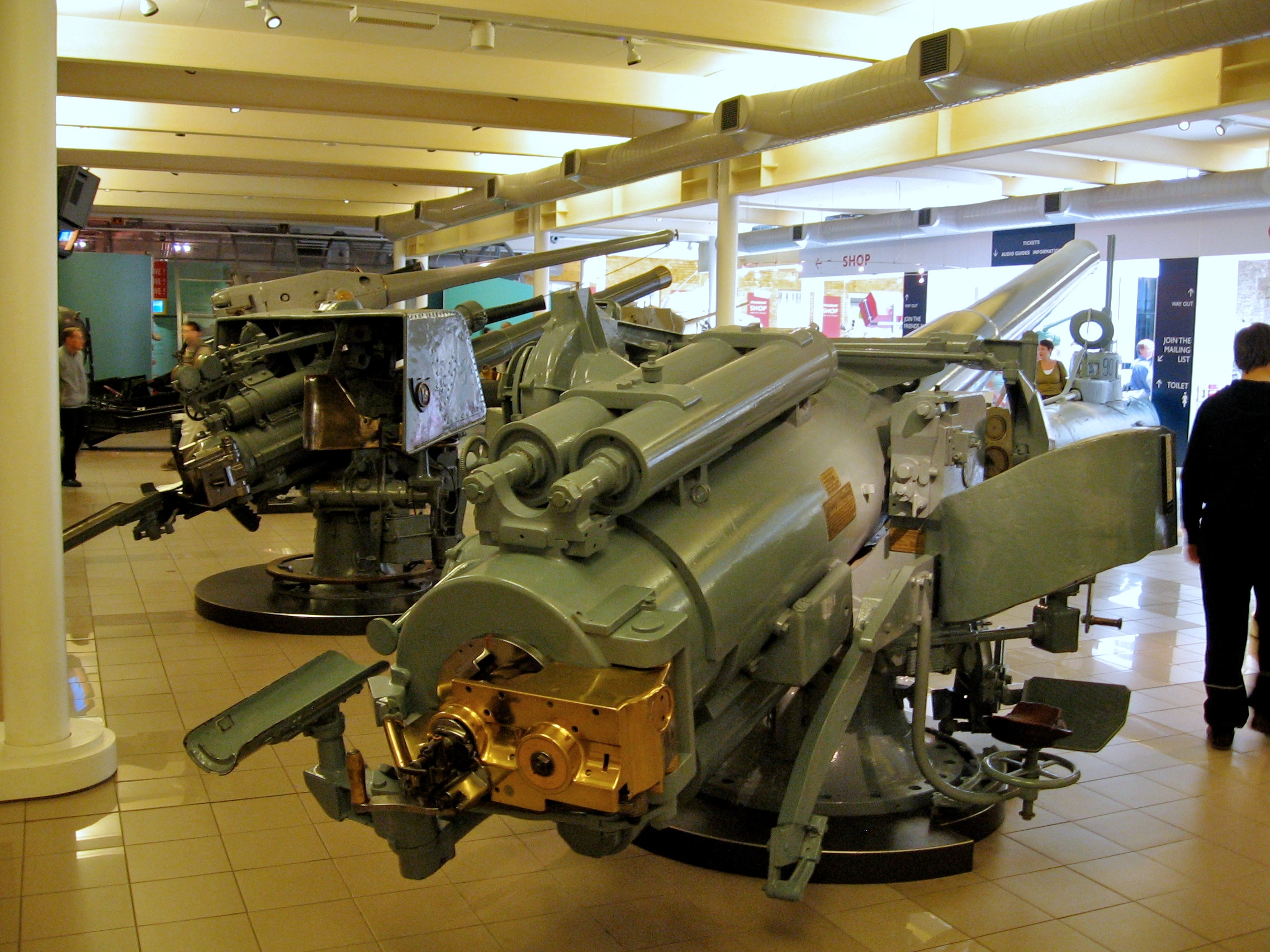
One of HMS Chester's 5.5-inch guns at the Imperial War Museum, London

== See also ==
- Apilan and kota mara
- Chase gun
- History of gunpowder
- Naval artillery in the Age of Sail
- Naval tactics in the Age of Sail
