= ML 8-inch shell gun =

Ordnance ML 8 inch gun
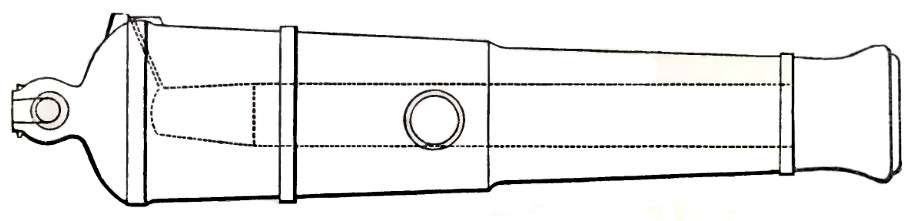
- 54 cwt gun
- Type: Naval gun
- Place of origin: United Kingdom

Service history
- In service: 1825–1860s
- Used by: Royal Navy

Production history
- Designer: General William Millar, R.A.
- Unit cost: £172

Specifications
- Mass: 7,280 pounds (3,300 kg) (65 cwt version); 6,048 pounds (2,743 kg) (54 cwt version)
- Barrel length: 9 feet (2.7 m) (65 cwt version); 8 feet (2.4 m) (54 cwt version)
- Shell: 49 pounds 14 ounces (22.6 kg) (Common shell); 51 pounds 8 ounces (23.4 kg) (Martin's shell)
- Calibre: 8.05-inch (204.5 mm)
- Muzzle velocity: 1,464 feet per second (446 m/s) (49 lb 14 oz Common shell); 1,506 feet per second (459 m/s) (51 lb 8 oz Martin's shell)
- Maximum firing range: 3,300 yards (3,000 m)

The ML 8-inch shell guns of 50 cwt, 54 cwt and 65 cwt were the three variants of British cast iron smoothbore muzzle-loading guns designed specifically to fire the new generation of exploding shells pioneered in the early to mid-nineteenth century by Henri-Joseph Paixhans.

== Design ==
The idea behind a gun that could fire spherical exploding shells but not solid armour-piercing shot was that large projectiles capable of carrying a large explosive filling could be fired from comparatively light guns: the 8-inch 68 pounder gun intended to fire solid shot weighed 95 cwt (4,826 kg) compared to the 65 cwt (3,302 kg) of the typical 8-inch shell gun.

This was a "chambered" gun, meaning that the area at the breech-end of the gun where the gunpowder propellant charge burned was not of the same cylindrical section as the gun bore itself. The chamber was of the "Gomer" conical pattern, tapering towards the rear, typical of mortars of the day. This was necessitated by the need to minimise the gun's weight while still allowing it to fire a relatively heavy shell : it ensured that the thickest amount of metal surrounded the point of maximum pressure on firing, at the rear of the chamber. However, mortars fired at high elevations, allowing the powder charge to naturally seat into the coned rear end of the chamber, whereas guns such as this fired on a relatively flat trajectory, leading to the powder charge sitting on the bottom of the chamber. Hence in sea service using smaller "reduced" charges such as in short-range actions this slowed the rate of fire as precautions had to be taken to ensure that the powder charge remained correctly positioned within the chamber until firing, to avoid a misfire.

== Deployment ==
The early 6.71 ft (205 cm) 50 cwt version was deemed "too light and short for armament of great ships of war" and the 9 ft (270 cm) 65 cwt version of 1838 was the model typically deployed on British warships "of all rates and classes".

They were superseded by the new generation of rifled muzzle-loading guns in the 1860s, and 65 cwt versions were converted to RML 64-pounder 71 cwt guns via Palliser's method.

== See also ==
- List of naval guns

== Surviving examples ==
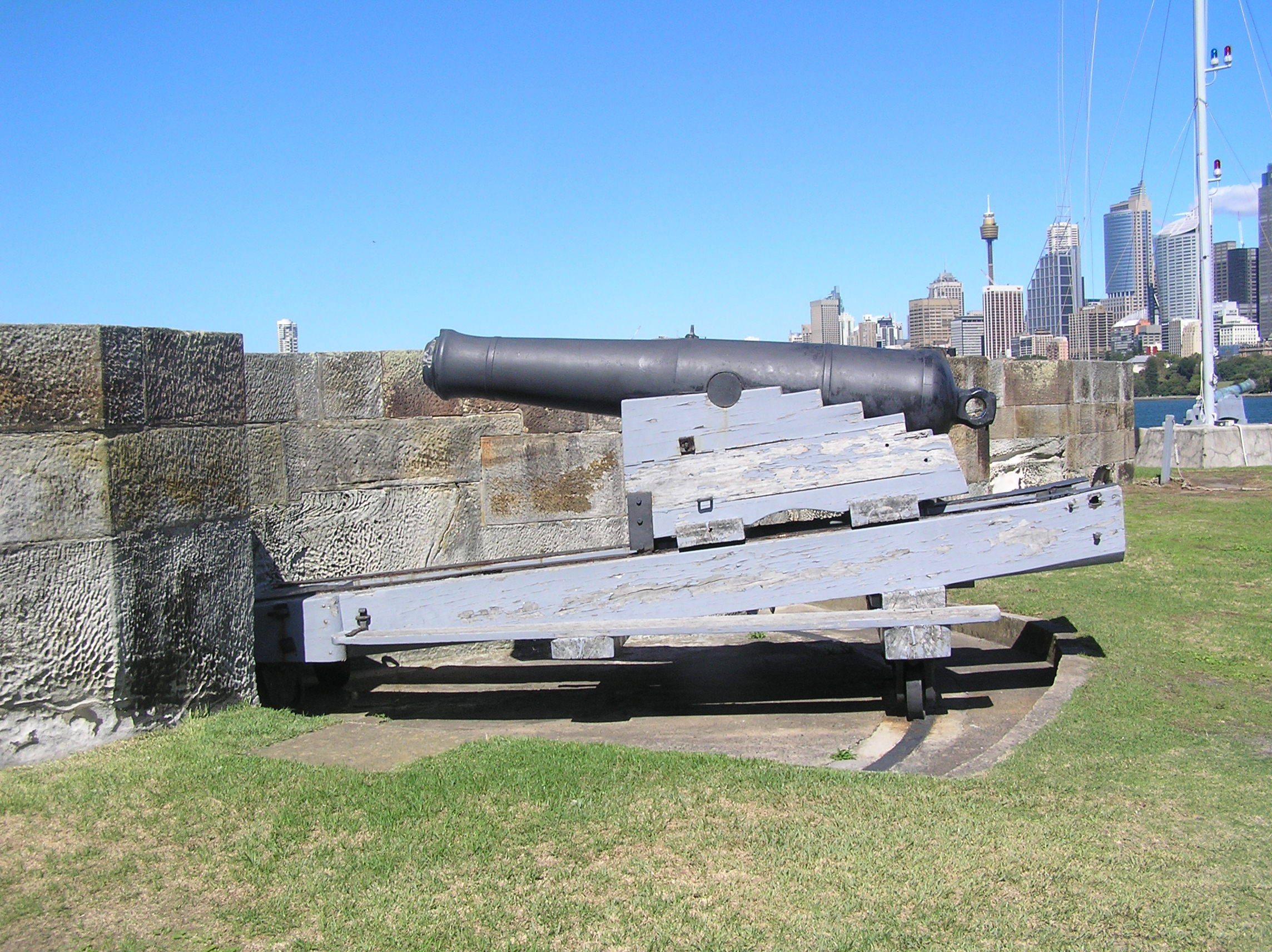
65 cwt gun at Fort Denison, Sydney, Australia

- 65 cwt gun at Fort Denison, Sydney, Australia
- 65 cwt gun at Pendennis Castle, Cornwall, UK
- Two 65 cwt guns dated 1843 at Fort Rouillé Monument, Toronto, Canada
- Two 65 cwt guns at the British Residency, Lucknow, India

== Bibliography ==
- General Sir Howard Douglas, "A Treatise on Naval Gunnery". Fifth edition, revised. published by John Murray, London, 1860
- Lieutenant-Colonel C H Owen R.A., "The principles and practice of modern artillery". published by John Murray, London, 1873
