= 32-pounder gun =

Naval gun from the Age of Sail

32-pounder guns
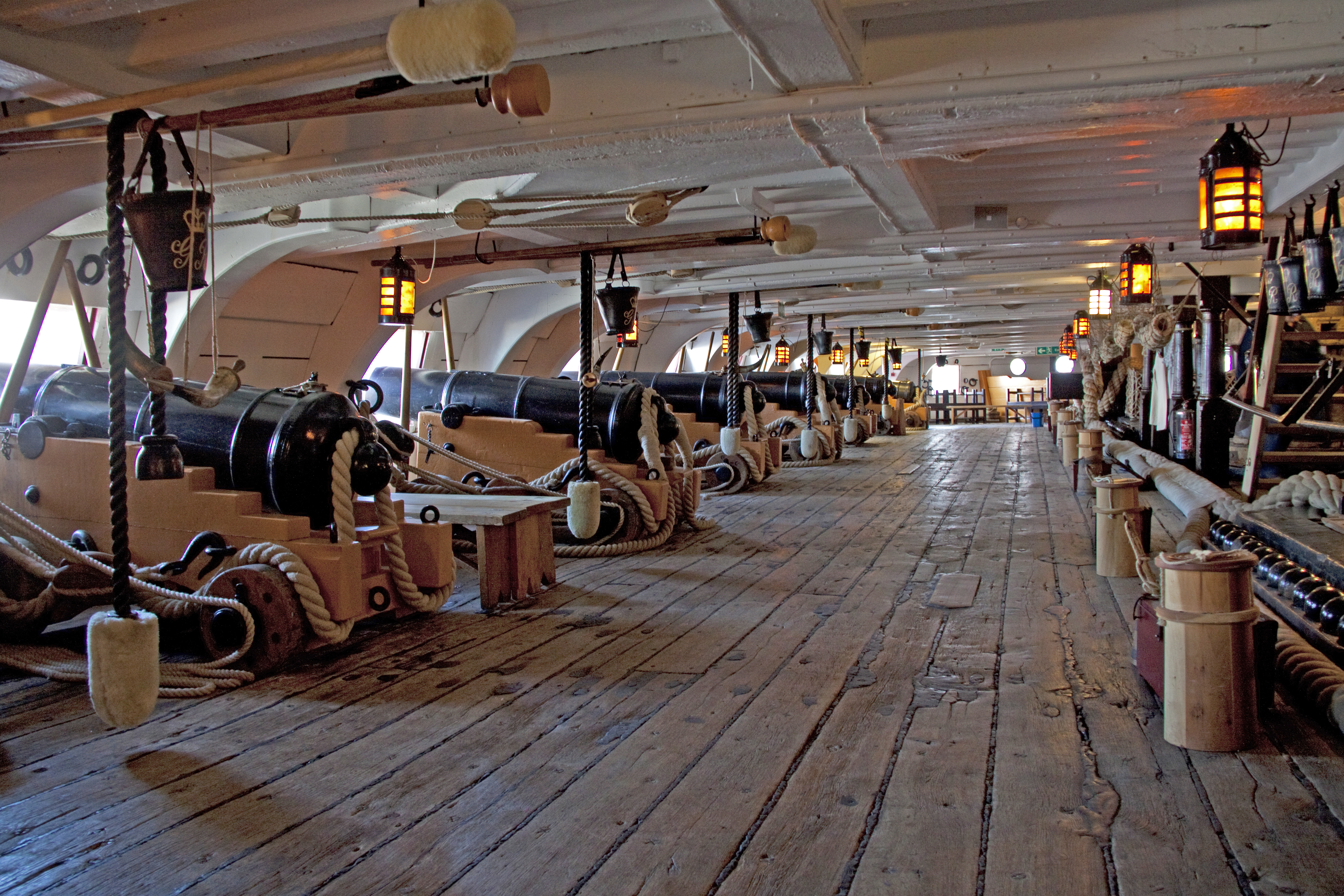
- 32 pdr gun deck on HMS Victory
- Type: Naval gun

Service history
- Used by: Great Britain

Specifications
- Mass: 1,270 - 3,200 kg
- Length: 5 ft 4 in (1.63 m) – 9 ft 6 in (2.90 m)
- Crew: 9 - 14
- Shell weight: 14.4 kg
- Calibre: 6.3–6.41 in (160–163 mm)
- Muzzle velocity: ~487 m/s

The 32-pounder guns (and the French 30-pounders) were sets of heavy-calibre pieces of artillery mounted on warships in the last century of the Age of Sail, during the 18th and early 19th centuries. It was usually the most powerful armament on a warship. The British version fired a 14.4-kilogram projectile at about 487 metres per second, for a muzzle energy of over 1.7 MJ (32 pounds at 1600ft/sec for an energy of ~1.3Mft-lbf) . They were most famous being mounted on HMS Victory of the Royal Navy. Such a powerful gun with a large weight of shot posed serious damage to enemy ships.

== Variations ==
Traditionally the calibre of a cannon was a good indication of the effectiveness of a gun. This was not quite true for the 32-pounders of the 1830s and later. The Royal Navy differentiated its 32-pounders by noting the weight of the piece in hundredweight (cwt). A 32-pounder 56 cwt was a heavy gun for ships of the line. It had a long range, a high chance to hit the target and had a high power of penetration. A 32-pounder 25 cwt fired the same shot, but with less gunpowder. It led to a lower muzzle velocity, lower range and less power of penetration. Because of the lower weight of the piece, the recoil was worse and tended to shake the gun, lowering the chances of hitting the target.

== Advocates of a high uniform calibre ==
In 1822 the French engineer Paixhans described the general superiority of heavy-calibre guns over smaller calibre guns. He proposed that in general, higher calibre guns were more effective than lower calibre guns, 'especially when firing at short ranges during the moments that decided a naval fight'. With regard to the upper calibres he thought that cannon over 36 (French) pounds were too slow and bulky. For the 36 pdr and lower calibres Paixhans claimed that it would be effective to use the highest-calibre cannon of the ships of the line as the uniform calibre used by these ships (le calibre du canon le plus gros de la batterie principale des vaisseaux de ligne peut être adopté comme calibre unique). The result would be the maximum effectiveness and simplified means.

As a practical implementation Paixhans proposed to retain the 36-pounder firing with 12 pounds of gunpowder on the lower deck of the ships of the line. For the second deck of the ships of the line and the big frigates he envisaged a lighter 36-pounder. It would be just as long, and weigh just as much as the French 24 pdr then in use, and fire with 7–8 pounds of gunpowder. For the third deck of the ships of the line and the small frigates he proposed an even lighter 36 pdr. It would weigh somewhere in between the 12- and 18-pounders then in use, and fire with only 5–6 pounds of powder. For the uppermost decks of the ships of the line and the frigates, and for small vessels, he proposed to retain the 36-pounder carronade, that weighed only 2,500 French pounds. Of course this proposal was suited for an approach that aimed to create these guns by boring up (or reaming out) guns to the next calibre.

== Bored-up guns ==
Boring up a gun meant increasing the calibre of an existing gun by removing metal from the inside of the gun. This was often combined with reducing windage (the space between the inside of the barrel and the projectile), so bored-up guns could propel a projectile with a lower gunpowder charge. The reduced windage did indeed result in greater power of penetration. Firing a heavy shot from a lighter gun did, however, mean a more severe recoil, damage to the carriage, rendering the gun unsteady, and therefore making the accuracy of fire more uncertain. A lighter gun therefore had a lower probability of hitting a target, especially at longer distances. If the service charge was reduced to limit the recoil, the power of penetration was lessened, thereby obviating the purpose of boring up.

The practice of boring up guns was especially popular in the 1830s, because it delivered the advantage of heavier shot and shell without incurring the expense of new heavier guns.

== British 32-pounders 1790-1830 ==
=== 32-pounder 56 cwt. by Blomefield ===
In the 1790s Sir Thomas Blomefield developed a 32-pounder cannon weighing a nominal 56 cwt. (2,845 kg). When it was designed, the weight and length of naval cannon was generally proportionate to the weight of the shot. As such the Blomefield 32-pdr was a classic smoothbore gun that 'founded' the family of innovative 32-pdrs. The Blomefield would remain popular right till the 1860s. In 1851 the captain of the H.M.S. Excellent, the naval testing laboratory ship, wrote in praise of the gun: The old gun has been a great favourite. It works extremely easy, its recoil is not too severe, it does not wear its vent away quickly, its precision is equal to the new Monk A, B, and C guns, which work heavily, and wear the vent away rapidly, and which have reduced windage.

=== 32-pounder carronade (17 cwt) ===
The carronade had been developed in the 1770s. It followed a pattern different from that of traditional smooth-bore cannon. As a 32-pounder it was shorter, lighter (17 cwt, 864 kg) and used less powder than a 32 pdr cannon. It compensated for this by having less windage (space between the barrel and the shot). By 1825 the 32-pounder carronade was the only carronade still in general use in the Royal Navy.

== British 32-pounders of the 1830s & 1840s ==
In 1829–1830 Melville had planned for 4 different weights of 32-pounders with which to realize the ambition of uniform calibre: the 63, 56 (existing), 48 and 25 cwt. In the end the admiralty decided on the expedient to bore up lighter guns in order to achieve uniform calibre as cheaply as possible. A technical reason for this economy was that at the time, the advent of shell guns threatened large broadside armaments with extinction. The net effect was that the existing 32-pounders (those of 56 cwt) on the lower decks tended to stay in place. The 18 and 24-pounder guns on the upper decks of ships were at first replaced by bored-up 32-pounders of the same weight, and later by new 32-pounders of about the same weight.

=== British heavy 32-pounders ===
==== 32-pounder 63 cwt by Millar ====
In 1829 William Millar designed a new heavy 32-pounder. It measured 9 feet 7 inches (292 cm), and weighed 63 cwt (3200 kg), considerably more than Blomefield's 32-pounder. There is a note suggesting that it was intended to become the new main gun for first-rates. The first-rate Howe might have had this gun on the lower deck for some time. In actual use the 63 cwt was found much too heavy for extensive broadside armament, and only 205 were cast. The 32 pdr 63 cwt was not mentioned in Douglas' table of artillery in use published in 1855, so it might have dropped out of general use on ships by then.

This heavy 32-pounder did find a use as solid shot armament in large steamers. HMS Dee (1832) carried four of them on pivots. The gun was mentioned during practices at Deal in 1839, where it achieved a very long range. This range was attained by increasing elevation. It was noted that the 63 cwt could fire indefinitely at 6 degrees of elevation (giving a more or less horizontal recoil). At 32 degrees elevation, however, the gun burst at the sixtieth round. The explanation was that at higher elevations the carriage only partially absorbed the recoil, giving the sides of the gun a much greater shock from the recoil.

==== 32-pounder 58 cwt by Dundas ====
Lieutenant-Colonel William Dundas designed a new heavy 32-pounder gun in 1847, aware that a fresh supply of 32-pounders would soon be needed. The new gun was of the same 9-foot-6-inch (290 cm) length as the Blomefields, but slightly heavier at 58 cwt (2946 kg). The new gun had slightly reduced windage compared with the Blomefield, at 0.198 inches (5.0 mm). Trials were held in 1847 and 1851, with the gun being adopted into service in 1853.

=== British medium 32-pounders ===
==== 32-pounder 48–50 cwt by Millar and Dickson ====
In 1829, or in the early 1830s, Millar designed a medium 32-pounder, 8 feet (240 cm) in length and weighing 48 to 50 cwt (2438 to 2540 kg). According to some, he designed the 32 pdr of 8 feet and 48 cwt, it having only two muzzle moulding rings. In 1865 the War Department noted that it had three patterns of 48 cwt, and two of 50 cwt. The name of Sir Alexander Dickson was also attached to these guns. He may have designed one of the other 32-pounders of 48–50 cwt. It did not really matter that much, because these guns were: 'Issued indiscriminately, mounted on the same carriages, and bracketed together in returns'. By 1855 the 8-foot cannon of 48 and 50 cwt were designated as Dickson's and Millar's and were still in service, but marked to be replaced by a 9 ft 50 cwt gun.

==== 32-pounders of 39, 40 and 41 cwt (bored up) ====
In 1830 the Royal Navy started to bore up a number of 24 pdr guns in order to get lighter 32-pounders. Eight-hundred 'Congreve' 24-pounders of 7 feet 6 inches (229 cm) and about as many 'Blomefield' 24-pounders were bored up to 32-pounders. The Blomefield 8-foot 24 pdr became the 32 pdr 41 cwt. The Blomefield 24 pdr 7 feet 6 inches became the 32 pdr 39 cwt, the Congreve 7 feet 6 inches became the 32 pdr 40 cwt.

==== 32-pounder 50 cwt Medium Gun A by Monk ====
It had been intended to bore up all the 6-foot and 9-foot 24-pounders to 32-pounders, but, in the trials made with several, they failed, partly through a diminution of the windage from .21 inch to .15 inch, and partly from the increase of the weight of the shot; on which accounts, though the diminution of the weight of metal was inconsiderable in itself, the strength of the guns was so much reduced that they could not resist the charges; it therefore became necessary to provide new 32-pounders, medium guns, as they were called, in order to complete the gradation to the old standard, the 32-pounder, 56 cwt., and 9 feet 6 inches long.

Mr. Monk put forward a new principle for the construction of guns in 1838. He maintained the ratio of metal in the gun to the shot as it had been (about 1.75 cwt to 1 pound, cf Blomefield's 32-pounder of 56 cwt). At the same time he redistributed a lot of metal from the chase of the gun to the charging cylinder.

In 1838 gun 'A' of 9 feet and 50 cwt succeeded its trials. Douglas remarked that this was an 'excellent gun'. It weighed no more than the old 24 pdr of 9.5 feet, but was thicker in the charge than the 32 pdr of 56 cwt. With a charge of 8 lbs it shot almost as far as the old gun of 56 cwt that was 6 inches longer. Note that the calibre (as in width of the barrel) of Monk's guns was less than that of the old 32-pounders, reducing windage.

Douglas noted that the 32 pdr 50 cwt had generally superseded the 24 pdrs of 48 and 50 cwt in the naval service. This statement seems counter-intuitive when one assumes that Gun A had almost the same effectiveness as the 56 cwt. It is nevertheless confirmed by Douglas' overview of the armament of the British Navy by July 1848. It shows that the 32 pdr 50 cwt was placed on the middle deck of the Caledonia class, replacing the 24 pdrs there, while the 32 pdrs of 56 cwt remained in place on the lower deck. The same applied to the second-rates of the Superb class. On some of the larger frigates the 50 cwt did become the main armament, but then again it was a replacement for the 24-pounder.

==== 32-pounder 45 cwt Medium Gun B by Monk ====
After succeeding with gun A, Monk brought gun 'B' of 8'6" 45 cwt to trial later in 1838. It also It seems that the Gun B of 45 cwt was not widely adopted.

==== 32-pounder 42 cwt Medium Gun C by Monk ====
The third gun designed by Monk was gun C of 8 feet and 42 cwt. This gun found widespread adaption in the Royal Navy. It was placed on the main deck of the first-rates of the Caledonia class, and on that of the Queen class. It was also on the quarterdeck and forecastle of the second-rates of the Albion class, and on a fifth-rate like HMS Pique.

=== British light 32-pounders ===
==== 32-pounder 25 cwt by Millar and Dickson ====
In 1829 Millar designed a 32-pounder of 6 feet, weighing only 25 cwt. At first he was also named as the designer of a 32-pounder of 5 feet 4 inch and 25 cwt, but later this gun was attributed to Alexander Dickson. Note that these light guns of 25 cwt were designed along the lines proposed by the advocates of high-calibre guns (cf. above). These guns were not that successful. The 6-foot gun vanished quickly; that of 5 feet 4 inches was declared obsolete in 1865.

== Overview of British 32-pounders ==
The base for the below table of 32-pounders is table XVII in Douglas' A treatise on Naval Gunnery published in 1855:

Gun Length (ft)	Weight (cwt)	Bore	Windage	Charge	Date first cast	Notes
9' 6"	58	6.375"	0.198"	10 lbs ?	1847	Dundas
9' 6"	56	6.41"	0.233"	10 lbs	1790s	Blomefield's
8'	48–50	6.41"	0.233"	8 lbs	1829	Dickson and Millar
9'	50	6.375"	0.198"	8 lbs	1838	Monk's gun A
8'6"	45	6.35"	0.173"	7 lbs	1838	Monk's gun B
8'	42	6.35"	0.173"	6 lbs	1838	Monk's gun C
7'6"-8'	39-41	6.35"	0.173"	6 lbs	1830	Bored up Blomefield and Congreve 24 pdrs
6'6"	32	6.3"	0.123"	5 lbs	1839	Bored up Blomefield 24 pdr used in brigs and some 1st-rates
6'	25	6.3"	0.123"	4 lbs	1845	Dundas, new and bored up 18 pdrs Has only two muzzle mouldings
4'	17	6.25"	0.073"	2lbs 11 oz.	1779	Carronade
