= 68-pounder gun =

68-pounder smoothbore cannon
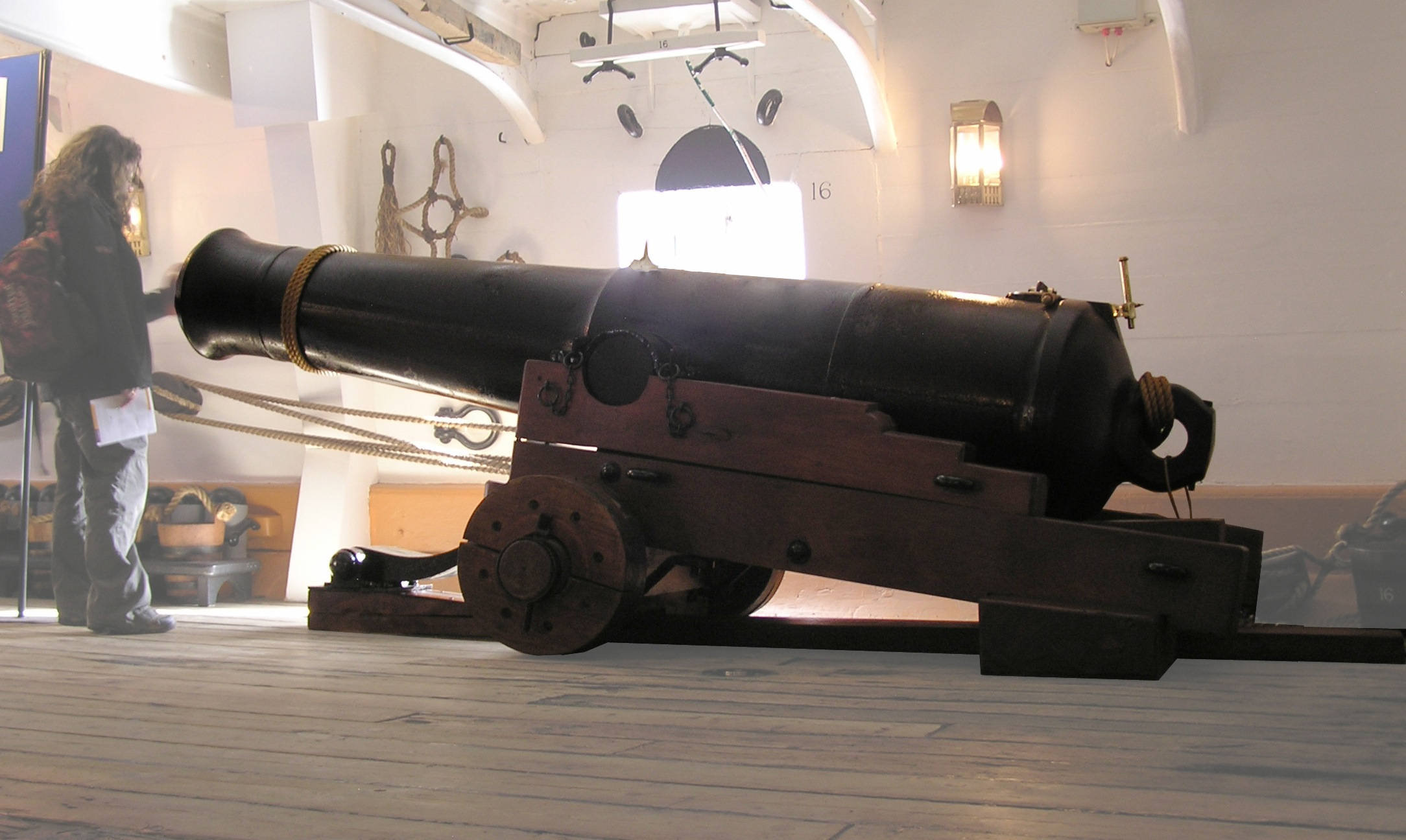
- Replica 68-pounder aboard HMS Warrior.
- Type: Naval gun Coast Defence gun
- Place of origin: United Kingdom

Service history
- In service: 1846–1921
- Used by: United Kingdom; Empire of Brazil
- Wars: Crimean War

Production history
- Designer: William Dundas
- Manufacturer: Low Moor Ironworks
- Unit cost: £225
- Produced: 1841–1861
- No. built: In excess of 2,000

Specifications
- Mass: 88, 95 or 112 cwt
- Barrel length: 88 cwt: 9 feet 6 inches (2,896 mm); 95 cwt: 10 feet (3,048 mm); 112 cwt: 10 feet 10 inches (3,302 mm)
- Crew: 9 – 18
- Shell: Solid Shot; Explosive Shell
- Shell weight: 68 pounds (30.84 kg)
- Calibre: 8.12 inches (20.62 cm)
- Elevation: 0 – 15 degrees
- Muzzle velocity: 1,579 feet per second (481 m/s)
- Effective firing range: Approximately 3,000 yards (2,700 m)
- Maximum firing range: 3,620 yards (3,310 m)

The 68-pounder cannon was an artillery piece designed and used by the British Armed Forces in the mid-19th century. The cannon was a smoothbore muzzle-loading gun manufactured in several weights firing projectiles of 68 lb (31 kg). Colonel William Dundas designed the 112 cwt version in 1841 which was cast the following year. The most common variant, weighing 95 long cwt (4,800 kg), dates from 1846. It entered service with the Royal Artillery and the Royal Navy and saw active service with both arms during the Crimean War. Over 2,000 were made and it gained a reputation as the finest smoothbore cannon ever made.

The gun was produced at a time when new rifled and breech loading guns were beginning to make their mark on artillery. At first the 68-pounder's reliability and power meant that it was retained even on new warships such as HMS Warrior, but eventually new rifled muzzle loaders made all smoothbore muzzle-loading guns obsolete. However, the large surplus stocks of 68-pounders were given new life when converted to take rifled projectiles; the cannon remained in service and was not declared obsolete until 1921.

== Design ==
The cannon was designed in response to the need for heavier weaponry as armour on ships of the line improved. Colonel William Dundas, the government's Inspector of Artillery between 1839 and 1852, designed the cannon in 1846. It was cast by the Low Moor Iron Works in Bradford in 1847 and entered service soon after. Like numerous cannon before it, it was a cast iron smoothbore loaded from the muzzle. The cannon was relatively cheap to produce – the Royal Commission on the Defence of the United Kingdom estimated that each cannon cost approximately £167. (2010 : £12,645). Over 2000 were cast before 1861 and its exceptional durability, range and accuracy earned it a reputation as the finest smoothbore cannon ever made.

== Operation ==
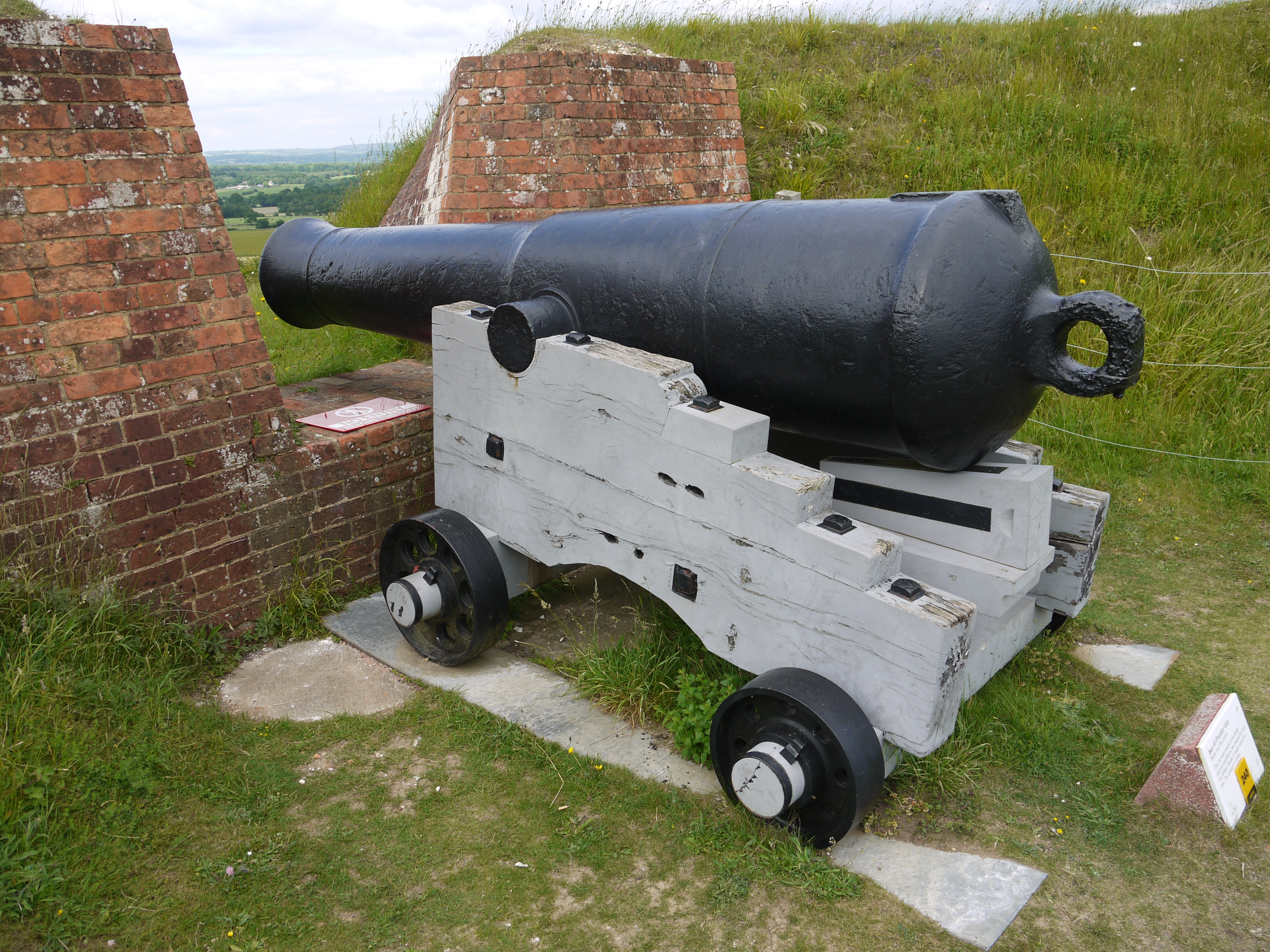
A 68-pounder on a replica carriage

The gun was a traditional muzzleloader; it needed to be loaded from the front end of the barrel. Before it could be loaded the bore of the barrel was cleaned with a sponge, after which a propellant charge (gunpowder in a cloth bag) was rammed down into the breech. This was followed by a projectile, often encased in wadding. The gun was primed (using a metal spike inserted through the vent that pierced the charge), and fired using a percussion cap (which ignited the charge and forced the projectile out of the barrel). The estimated rate of fire of this weapon was between 55 and 70 seconds, though loading speed could be expected to fall off as crew became fatigued.

The 68-pounder had an effective range of approximately 3,000 yd (2,700 m), however at its maximum elevation of 15 degrees it had a maximum range of 3,620 yd (3,310 m), a distance that the projectile would cover in 15 seconds. With a 16 lb (7.3 kg) powder charge (the "far" charge, although the gun was proofed to 25 lb charges) the cannon fired a 68 lb (31 kg) solid shot at a muzzle velocity of 1,579 ft/s (481 m/s). (Note: This is the velocity and range recorded by Andrew Lambert but there are alternatives records of the 68-pounder's velocity. Winton records it as 1,280 ft/s (390 m/s) and Hogg as 1,425 ft/s (434 m/s) The 1865 Treatise on Ordnance and Armour recorded a maximum mean velocity of 2,040 ft/s (620 m/s), but both range and velocity were heavily influenced by the gun's elevation.)

The cannon could fire solid shot, explosive shells, grapeshot, case shot and "Martins Liquid Iron Shell" (thin walled shells filled with molten iron, intended to serve as heated shot). Although the cannon's barrel bore was 8.12 inches (20.6 cm), both shot and shells were 7.92 inches (20.1 cm) in diameter. This allowed a windage gap of 0.1 in (0.25 cm) around the projectile; enough to aid the loading process, but not enough to seriously diffuse the propellant gasses.

A muzzle-loaded cannon: 1) projectile (shot), 2) powder charge, 3) vent

The official weight of the shot was listed at 68 lbs but in reality this varied according to the material of the shot itself; cast iron shot weighed 67 lb (30 kg), wrought iron shot and steel shot weighed 72 lb (33 kg), and chilled steel weighed 68 lb 8 oz (31.1 kg). It was estimated that one 68-pound shot had the destructive power equivalent to five 32-pound shot. The explosive shells were primed with 4 lb (1.8 kg) of gunpowder. They were fitted with simple fuses that were ignited by the flash of the charge – early wooden fuses were eventually replaced by more reliable fuses designed by Captain Edward Boxer in 1849. The gun crew still had to gauge the best length of fuse for the range they were firing – ideally the shell should explode just before hitting its target. To prevent the shell exploding in the barrel it was fitted with a sabot to ensure the fuse faced away from the charge.

On land a minimum crew of nine men (usually commanded by a non-commissioned officer) was required to fire the gun, which was normally mounted on a traversing gun carriage. On board a ship the gun crew could be doubled to 18 men who needed to traverse the gun carriage by hand, using hand spikes and rope tackles. The extra crew was because sailing ships usually only fired their cannon from one side of the deck. In the unlikely event of both sides being in action at once, nine men would be detached to man the gun opposite. In both cases the gun was elevated using wooden wedges driven under the breech of the barrel by brute force. It was aimed using an advanced hexagonal sighting mechanism marked with the elevation on one face and the gun's range (according to different weights of cartridge charges) on the other five faces.

== Service ==
The cannon was put to use both on land and at sea. It was fitted to numerous Royal Navy warships of different sizes such as HMS Queen, Odin, Victor Emmanuel, Sepoy and the Conqueror-class ships of the line. Several of these ships saw action during the Crimean War where the 68-pounder was used extensively during the Siege of Sevastopol. Along with 32-pounders and Lancaster guns they were taken from their ship mountings and dragged up to siege batteries by the Naval Brigade, from where they regularly bombarded Russian positions for the next year. The cannon was also fitted in large numbers to the Aetna-class ironclad floating batteries, although these had little impact on the war.

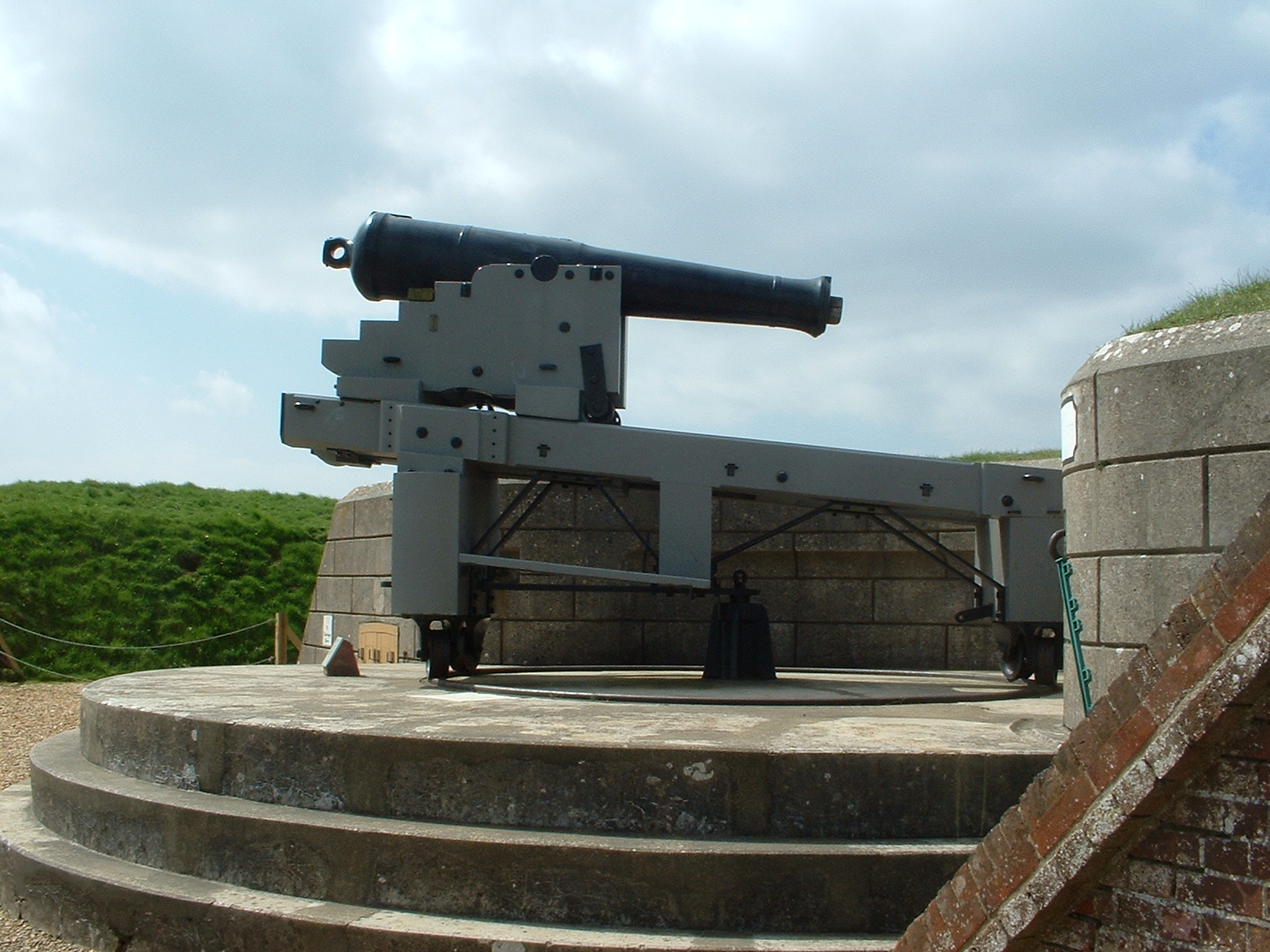
A typical land based traversing carriage. This is actually a 64-pounder rifled muzzle-loading cannon, displayed at Fort Nelson.

Most notably the 68-pounder was fitted to the Warrior-class ironclads Warrior and Black Prince. Originally it was intended to fit forty 68-pounders, primarily on one gun deck, but this specification changed during their building and they were finally equipped with twenty-six 68-pounders (13 on each side). Alongside these, the ships were equipped with new rifled breech loading Armstrong guns of two types; 7 inch and 40 pounders. Although the Armstrong guns represented a new direction in artillery, the breech loading mechanism meant that they were unable to withstand the explosion of a heavy cartridge. Smaller cartridge charges were therefore required and the gun's muzzle velocity suffered as a result. Ironically the Armstrong Guns were therefore incapable of penetrating the armour fitted to the Warrior-class ships, while the 68-pounder (with its high muzzle velocity) could. As late as 1867 it was planned to fit the new Plover-class gunvessels with 68-pounders, but they were instead completed with a RML 7 inch gun and a RML 64 pounder 64 cwt gun.

On land the 68-pounder was used extensively in British coastal defences constructed during the 1850s - notably at forts like Gomer and Elson defending Portsmouth, and Forts Victoria, Albert and Freshwater Redoubt defending the Needles Passage. The 1859 Royal Commission envisaged arming the numerous new forts they proposed with the 68-pounder cannon and costed for them accordingly. The introduction of the Armstrong gun initially led many to think that weapon would be used instead, but whilst the forts were being built, the Armstrong gun's weaknesses were exposed and the military reverted to using muzzle loaded weapons. However, the advantages of rifling and the Armstrong's wrought iron construction were retained, leading to a new design of artillery piece – rifled muzzle loaders.

== Conversion to rifled muzzle loader ==
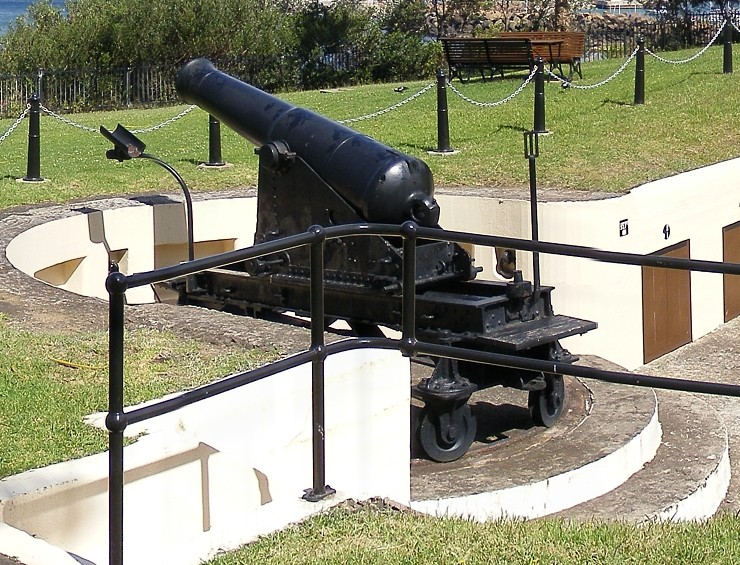
RML 80-pounder 55 long tons (5.1 t; 5.6 short tons) at Smiths Hill Fort, Wollongong, NSW, Australia.

The introduction of rifled muzzle loaders (also classed as RMLs) rendered smoothbore guns largely obsolete. However, the 68-pounder and other smoothbores still existed in large numbers and various attempts were made to adapt the guns to fire new projectiles. Eventually Captain William Palliser patented a method of boring out the gun barrel and inserting a wrought iron rifled liner. This allowed rifled shot and shells to be fired from old smoothbore cannon and experiments revealed that it made them even more powerful than they had been before. Introduced in 1872, 68-pounders adapted in this way had a calibre of 6.29 inches (16.0 cm) and were known as a RML 68-pounder, or officially as the RML 80-pounder 5 ton. With a 10 lb (4.5 kg) powder charge they could fire an 80 lb (36 kg) projectile at a muzzle velocity of 1,240 feet per second (380 m/s). They were deployed as coast defence and garrison artillery around the British Empire and remained in service until eventually declared obsolete in 1921.

At least two 68 pounders were converted to 7 in (18 cm) 6.55 long tons (6.66 t; 7.34 short tons) RML guns, firing a 115 lb (52 kg) or 150 lb (68 kg) double shot.

== Surviving examples ==
- Southsea Castle
- Carrickfergus Castle
- Fort Nelson, Hampshire, Royal Amouries Collection
- Bradleys Head, Sydney Harbour, Australia
- Flagstaff Hill Fort, NSW, Australia
- Two guns at Port Fairy, Victoria, Australia - from Flickr
- Garden Island Dockyard, NSW, Sydney, Australia
- Halifax Citadel, Canada
- Daylesford Botanical Gardens, Victoria Australia.

== See also ==
- 68-pounder Lancaster gun - a gun of the same weight and calibre, featuring an early design of rifling.

== Bibliography ==
- Treatise on the Construction and Manufacture of Ordnance in the British Service. Royal Gun Factory, 1877
- Cantwell, Anthony (1985). Fort Victoria: 1852–1969. Isle of Wight County Council Cultural Services. ISBN 0-906328-32-2.
- General Sir Howard Douglas, "A Treatise on Naval Gunnery". Fifth edition, revised. published by John Murray, London, 1860
- Hogg, Ian (1974). Coast Defences of England and Wales, 1856–1956. Vancouver: David & Charles. ISBN 0-7153-6353-0.
- Lambert, Andrew (1987). Warrior: Restoring the World's First Ironclad. London: Conway. ISBN 0-85177-411-3.
- Winton, John (1987). Warrior, The First and the Last. Cornwall: Maritime Books. ISBN 0-907771-34-3.
- Winton, John (2001) [First published in 2000]. An Illustrated History of the Royal Navy. London: Salamander Books. ISBN 1-84065-218-7.
