= HMS Hannibal (1854) =

Ship of the line of the Royal Navy

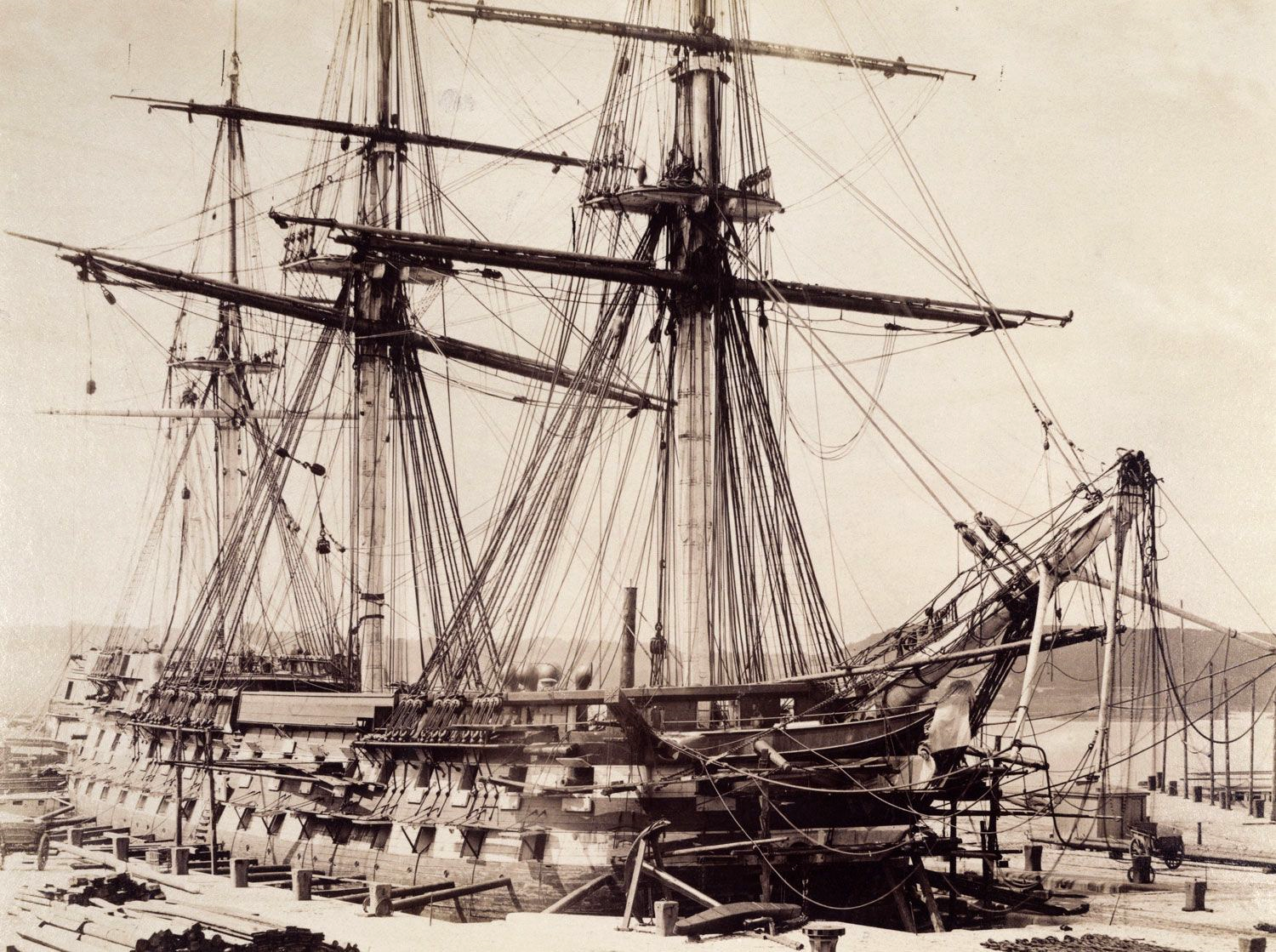
- Hannibal fitting for the Black Sea fleet, December 1853

History

Royal NavyUnited Kingdom
- Name: Hannibal
- Ordered: 12 March 1840
- Builder: Deptford Dockyard
- Launched: 31 January 1854
- Reclassified: Hulked, 1884
- Fate: Sold for scrap, 12 April 1904

General characteristics (as built)
- Class & type: 91-gun, second-rate Princess Royal-class ship of the line
- Tons burthen: 3,136 bm
- Length: 217 ft 6 in (66.3 m) (gundeck)
- Beam: 58 ft 1 in (17.7 m)
- Draught: 26 ft 6 in (8.1 m)
- Depth of hold: 24 ft (7.3 m)
- Installed power: Boilers; 1,071 ihp (799 kW)
- Propulsion: 1 screw; 1 single-expansion steam engine
- Sail plan: Full-rigged ship
- Speed: 8.6 knots (15.9 km/h; 9.9 mph)
- Complement: 850
- Armament: 91 muzzle-loading, smoothbore guns: Lower deck: 32 × 8 in (203 mm) shell guns; Upper deck: 34 × 32 pdrs; Quarter deck & Forecastle: 24 × 32 pdrs; 1 × 68 pdr

HMS Hannibal was a 91-gun, second rate Princess Royal-class ship of the line built for the Royal Navy (RN) during the 1850s. The ship was converted to screw power while under construction. Completed in 1854, she played a minor role in the Crimean War of 1854–1856 against the Russian Empire, participating in the Battle of Kinburn in 1855 as a flagship. The ship was then assigned to the Mediterranean Fleet before she returned home and was paid off at the end of 1856. Hannibal spent most of the later 1850s as a guard ship. She later served as a flagship in the Mediterranean Fleet before she was paid off in 1861. Hannibal then became a depot ship. The ship was sold for scrap in 1904.

== Background and description ==
Hannibal was originally ordered in 1840 as an Albion-class ship of the line, but only work on her hull frames had begun at Woolwich Dockyard before work was suspended in 1842. The ship's frames were subsequently moved to a smaller slipway to make room for the first rate Royal Albert and then they were taken down and placed in storage in early 1843. She was modified by the Assistant Surveyor of the Navy, John Edye, in 1847 to eliminate the deep hull shape preferred by the Surveyor of the Navy, William Symonds, who was now out of favour with the Board of Admiralty, and was lengthened four feet (1.2 m) over her sister, Princess Royal. Hannibal was reordered to the new design later that year and her frames were transferred to Deptford Dockyard, although the last of them did not arrive until the end of 1848.

The ship was intended to measure 208 feet (63.4 m) at the gun deck and 170 feet 7 inches (52.0 m) at the keel. She would have had a beam of 58 feet (17.7 m), a depth of hold of 24 feet (7.3 m) and had a tonnage of 2,965 75/94 tons burthen. Her crew would have numbered 750 officers and ratings in peacetime and 820 at war. The ship had the usual three-masted full-ship rig. Hannibal's muzzle-loading, smoothbore armament was intended to consist of twenty-eight 32-pounder (56 cwt) guns (Note: "Cwt" is the abbreviation for hundredweight, 56 cwt referring to the weight of the gun.) and four 8 in (203 mm) (65 cwt) shell guns on the lower gun deck. The upper gun deck was planned to have had twenty-six 50 cwt, 32-pounders and six 8-inch shell guns. Between her forecastle and quarterdeck, the ship would have carried twenty-four 32-pounder (42 cwt) guns and a pair of 8-inch, 52 cwt, shell guns.

=== Screw conversion ===
Completion of the French fast steam-powered, second-rate Napoléon in early 1852 and the French preparations for building more like her caused an invasion scare that prompted the First Derby ministry to authorize a large programme of steam-powered ships of the line to maintain British naval superiority; thus initiating a naval arms race between France and Britain. Captain Baldwin Wake Walker, the new Surveyor of the Navy, ordered Hannibal to be converted in 1852 in response while she was still under construction. Hannibal measured 217 feet 6 inches (66.3 m) on the gun deck and 179 feet 7 inches (54.7 m) on the keel. The ship was widened by an inch (25 mm), but her depth of hold were unaltered. She had a deep draught of 26 feet 6 inches (8.1 m) and had a tonnage of 3,136 tons burthen. The ship was fitted with a horizontal, geared, two-cylinder, single-expansion steam engine built by Scott, Sinclair & Co. that had been taken from the frigate HMS Greenock. It was rated at 450 nominal horsepower and drove a single propeller shaft. Her boilers provided enough steam to give the engine 1,071 indicated horsepower (799 kW) that was good for a speed of 8.6 knots (15.9 km/h; 9.9 mph) during her sea trials at the Nore on 12 April 1854, with some of her launching equipment still attached. To reduce drag and improve performance under sail, the ship could hoist her propeller into the hull and retract the telescoping funnel. Her crew numbered 850 officers and ratings.

The ship's armament consisted of thirty-two 8-inch shell guns on her lower gun deck and thirty-four 322-pounder (56 cwt) guns on her upper gun deck. Between her forecastle and quarterdeck, she carried twenty-four 32-pounder (42 cwt) guns and a single 68-pounder gun on a pivot mount.

== Construction and career ==
Named for the Carthaginian general, Hannibal was the fifth ship of her name to serve in the RN. She was ordered as a 90-gun, second rate, Albion-class ship of the line on 12 March 1840, but was never laid down. The ship was reordered to a John Edye design on 19 June 1847 that was lengthened from the modified Princess Royal design of the same year. She was laid down at Deptford Dockyard in December 1848. The ship was reordered again as a screw-powered, 90-gun, second rate on 23 September 1852. The conversion was ordered on 30 October and work began the same day which included inserting a 9-foot (2.7 m) section into the ship's middle to accommodate the steam engine. She was launched on 31 January 1854 and was commissioned by Captain Frederick Grey on 18 March 1854. Hannibal was completed for sea on 22 June.

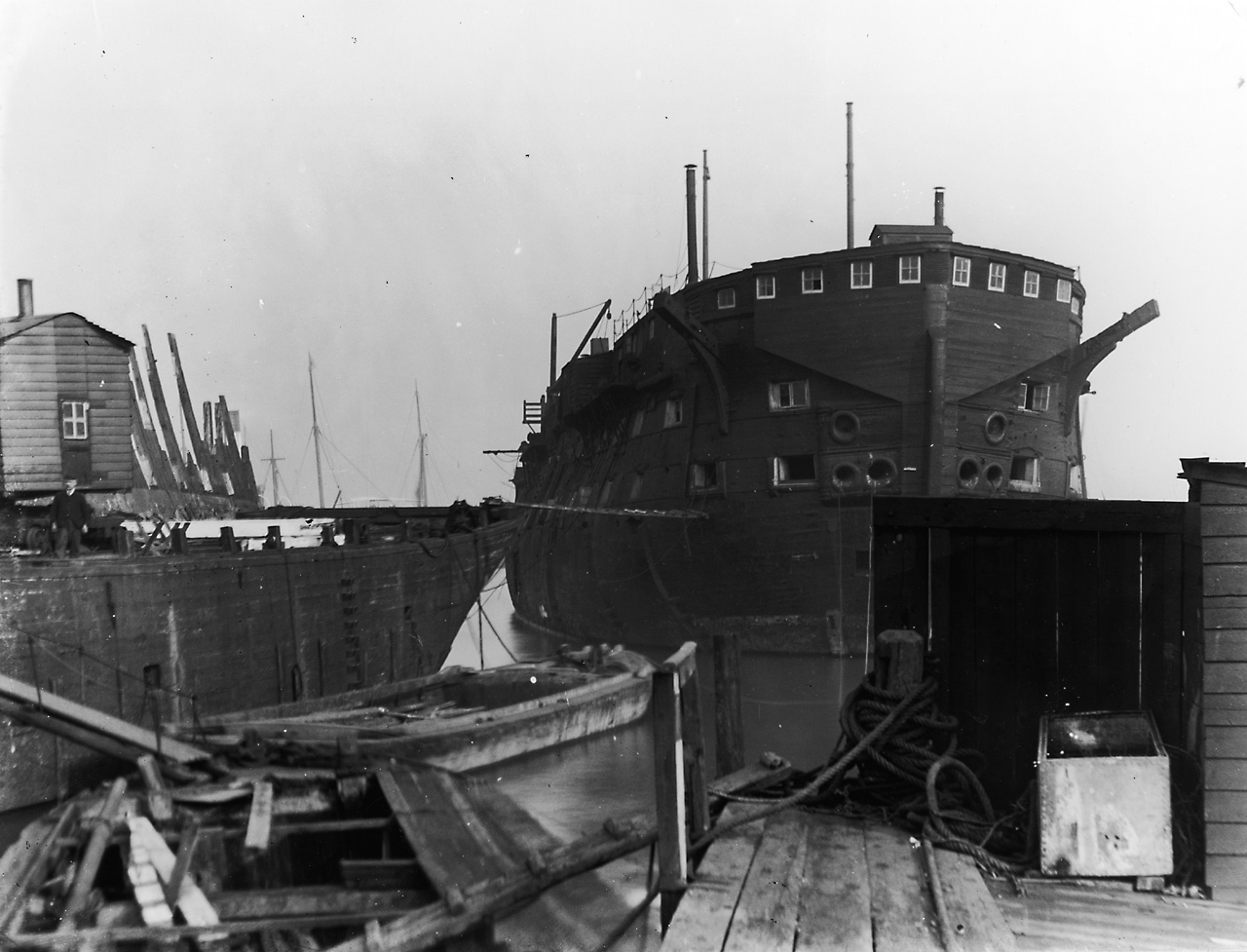
Hannibal in Castles Yard, Charlton for scrapping

She served in the Crimean War, initially as the flagship of Commodore Frederick Grey, commanding the fleet bringing 10,000 French troops to the Åland Islands in June 1854; Hannibal off-loaded the guns from her lower gun deck to accommodate some of the French troops. After the Battle of Bomarsund in August, the ship helped to ferry 343 of the Russian prisoners back to Britain. She arrived off Sevastopol, Crimea, in December. By 25 January 1855, the ship was the flagship of Rear-Admiral Houston Stewart in the Black Sea and was commanded by Captain John Charles Dalrymple Hay. On 22 May, Hannibal was part of the fleet that landed Allied troops near the city of Kerch. The Russian troops in the vicinity withdrew, demolishing the local defences and burning most of their supplies, allowing the Allies to occupy and loot Kerch and Yeni-Kale. The ship then participated in the June raid on Anapa that was forestalled by the evacuation of the Russian garrison. During the Battle of Kinburn on 17 October, she bombarded the fort and was not damaged during the battle. Hannibal departed from the Black Sea on 15 November, bound for the Mediterranean. She spent most of 1856 there, before she arrived at Portsmouth on 20 November to be paid off.

The ship was recommissioned on 1 February 1858 by Captain George Hastings as the guard ship at Portsmouth. He was relieved by Captain George Gordon on 29 June. Gordon was relieved in his turn by Captain Matthew Connolly on 29 April 1859 when the ship was transferred to the Mediterranean Fleet as the flagship of the second-in-command, Rear-Admiral Rodney Mundy. Captain Arthur Farquhar replaced Connolly on 30 March 1860. During Giuseppe Garibaldi's Expedition of the Thousand, Hannibal was present during the Siege of Palermo, Sicily, in May 1860 to protect British citizens and property. The ship was paid off on 24 December 1861.

Hannibal was recommissioned by Commander Charles Curme on 6 February 1863 to serve as a depot ship in Portsmouth. Captain John Seccombe relieved Curme on 1 April 1863. She was replaced by Duke of Wellington on 30 April, but became a part of Duke of Wellington's establishment. Hannibal was hulked in 1884 and sold for scrap to Henry Castle & Sons on 12 April 1904. The ship was subsequently broken up at their facility in Charlton, London.

== Bibliography ==
- Clowes, William Laird (1901). The Royal Navy: A History from the Earliest Times to the Present. Vol. VI. Sampson Low, Marston.
- Colledge, J. J.; Warlow, Ben & Bush, Steve (2020). Ships of the Royal Navy: The Complete Record of all Fighting Ships of the Royal Navy from the 15th Century to the Present (5th revised and updated ed.). Seaforth Publishing. ISBN 978-1-5267-9327-0.
- Duckers, Peter (2011). The Crimean War at Sea: Naval Campaigns against Russia, 1854-56. Pen & Sword Maritime. ISBN 978-1-84884-267-0.
- Heathcote, T. A. (2002). The British Admirals of the Fleet 1734–1995: A Biographical Dictionary. Leo Cooper. ISBN 1-84468-009-6.
- Lambert, Andrew D. (1984). Battleships in Transition: The Creation of the Steam Battlefleet 1815-1860. Conway Maritime Press. ISBN 0-85177-315-X.
- Lambert, Andrew D. (1991). The Last Sailing Battlefleet: Maintaining Naval Mastery 1815 - 1850. Conway Maritime Press. ISBN 0-85177-591-8.
- Lambert, Andrew (2011) [1990]. The Crimean War: British Grand Strategy Against Russia, 1853–56 (Second ed.). Ashgate. ISBN 978-1-4094-1011-9.
- Manning, T. D. & Walker, C. F. (1959). British Warship Names. Putnam. OCLC 838607.
- Warlow, B. (2000) [1992]. Shore Establishments of the Royal Navy (Revised and enlarged ed.). Maritime Books. ISBN 0-907771-73-4.
- Winfield, Rif (2014). British Warships in the Age of Sail 1817–1863: Design, Construction, Careers and Fates. Seaforth Publishing. ISBN 978-1-84832-169-4.
