= Princess Royal-class ship of the line =

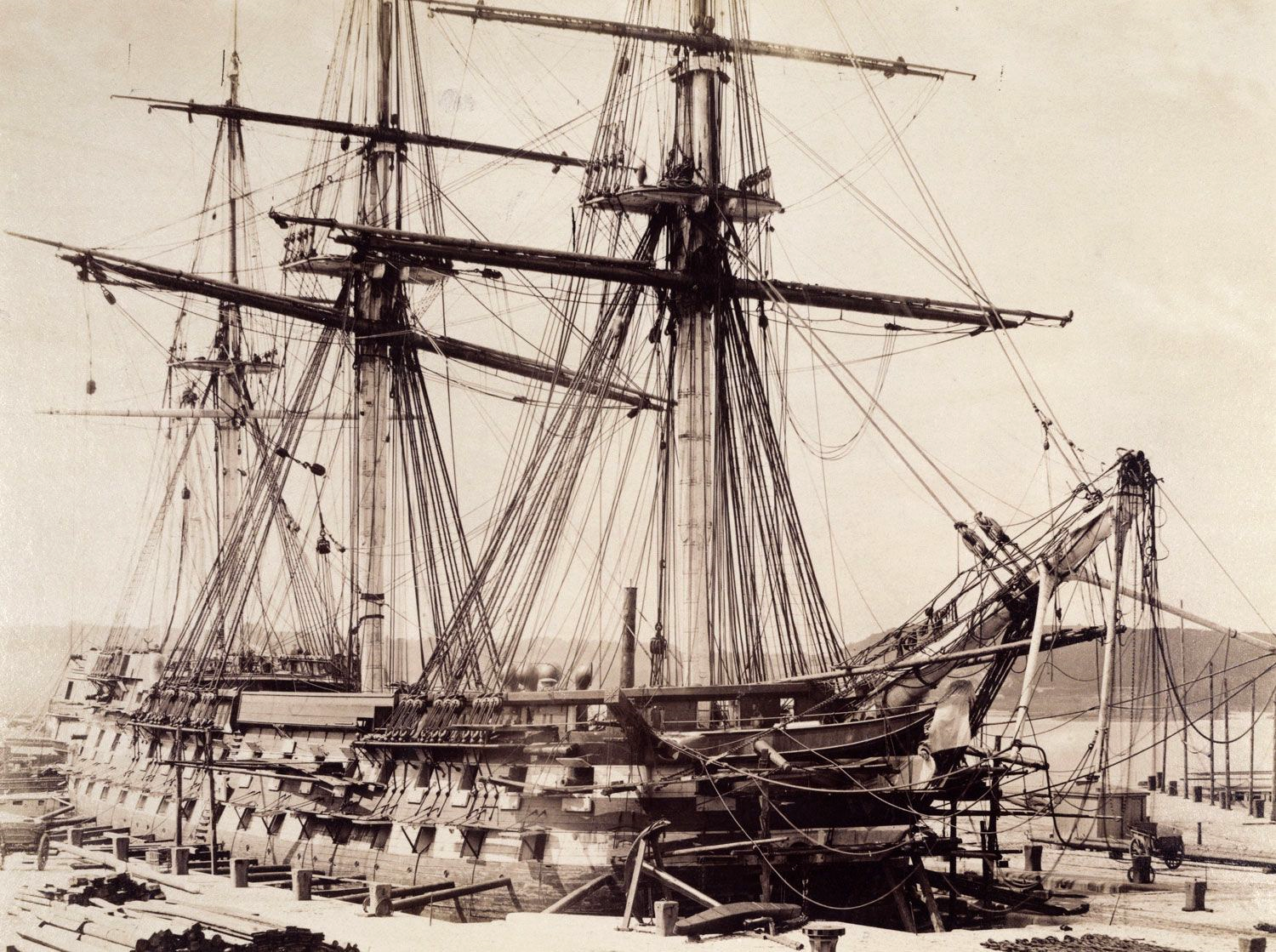
- Hannibal fitting out for the Black Sea fleet, December 1853

Class overview
- Name: Princess Royal
- Operators: Royal Navy
- Preceded by: Orion-class ship of the line
- Succeeded by: HMS Caesar
- Built: 1841–1854
- In service: 1854–1904
- In commission: 1854–1867
- Completed: 2
- Scrapped: 2

General characteristics (Princess Royal as converted)
- Type: First-rate ship of the line
- Tons burthen: 3,130 bm
- Length: 217 ft (66.1 m) (overall)
- Beam: 58 ft 2 in (17.7 m)
- Draught: 26 ft 6 in (8.1 m)
- Depth of hold: 24 ft (7.3 m)
- Installed power: Boilers; 1,492 ihp (1,113 kW)
- Propulsion: 1 screw; 1 single-expansion steam engine
- Sail plan: Full-rigged ship
- Speed: 11 knots (20 km/h; 13 mph)
- Complement: 850
- Armament: 91 muzzle-loading, smoothbore guns: Lower deck: 32 × 8 in (203 mm) shell guns; Upper deck: 34 × 32 pdr guns; Quarter deck & Forecastle: 24 × 32 pdrs + 1 × 68 pdr gun

The Princess Royal class consisted of a pair of 91-gun, second-rate ships of the line built for the Royal Navy (RN) during the 1850s, Princess Royal and Hannibal. The sisters were both converted into screw-propelled ships while under construction. Completed in 1854, they participated in the Crimean War of 1854–1856 against the Russian Empire. They were both assigned to the Baltic Fleet in 1854; Princess Royal for blockade duty while Hannibal served as a troopship. They were both transferred to the Mediterranean Fleet the following year for service in the Black Sea, Hannibal as the fleet flagship. Princess Royal played a minor role in the Siege of Sevastopol (1854–1855) and both sisters participated in the Battle of Kinburn. They returned home in mid- to late 1856.

Princess Royal subsequently served as a flagship for the Channel Squadron and the East Indies and China Station. She was paid off upon her return home in 1867 and was sold for scrap in 1872. Hannibal spent most of the later 1850s as a guard ship. She served as a flagship in the Mediterranean Fleet before she was paid off in 1861. The ship then became a depot ship. Hannibal was sold for scrap in 1904.

== Background and description ==
The Princess Royal-class ships were originally ordered in 1840 as Albion-class ships of the line. Hannibal was not laid down, only Princess Royal. She was intended to measure 204 feet (62.2 m) at the gun deck and 165 feet 11 inches (50.6 m) at the keel. The ship would have had a beam of 60 feet (18.3 m), a depth of hold of 23 feet 8 inches (7.2 m) and had a tonnage of 3,083 12/94 tons burthen. Her crew would have numbered 750 officers and ratings in peacetime and 820 at war. The ship had the usual three-masted full-ship rig. Princess Royal's muzzle-loading, smoothbore armament was intended to consist of twenty-eight 32-pounder (56 cwt) guns (Note: "Cwt" is the abbreviation for hundredweight, 56 cwt referring to the weight of the gun.) and four 8 in (203 mm) (65 cwt) shell guns on the lower gun deck. The upper gun deck was planned to have had twenty-six 56 cwt, 32-pounders and six 8-inch shell guns. Between her forecastle and quarterdeck, the ship would have carried twenty-four 32-pounder (42 cwt) guns and a pair of 8-inch, 52 cwt, shell guns.

Only work on Hannibal's hull frames had begun at Woolwich Dockyard before work was suspended in 1842. The ship's frames were subsequently moved to a smaller slipway to make room for the first rate Royal Albert and then they were taken down and placed in storage in early 1843. Hannibal's frames were transferred to Deptford Dockyard five years later. The sisters had their design modified by the Assistant Surveyor of the Navy, John Edye in 1847 to eliminate the deep hull shape preferred by the Surveyor of the Navy, William Symonds, who was now out of favour with the Board of Admiralty. They were generally identical, although Hannibal was lengthened four feet (1.2 m) over Princess Royal.

The half-built Princess Royal was dismantled to allow her hull be modified accordingly. The ship's length at the gun deck did not change, but her length at the keel increased to 166 feet 7 inches (50.8 m), vice Hannibal's 208 feet (63.4 m) at the gun deck and 170 feet 7 inches (52 m) at the keel. The beam for the sisters was decreased to 58 feet (17.7 m), their depth of hold increased to 24 feet (7.3 m). Princess Royal's tonnage was reduced to 2,896 25/94 tons burthen while Hannibal's tonnage was 2,965 75/94. The ships' armament and crew size did not change.

=== Screw conversion ===
Completion of the French fast steam-powered, second-rate Napoléon in early 1852 and the French preparations for building more like her caused an invasion scare that prompted the First Derby ministry to authorize a large programme of steam-powered ships of the line to maintain British naval superiority, thus initiating a naval arms race between France and Britain. Captain Baldwin Wake Walker, the new Surveyor of the Navy, ordered the sisters to be converted on 23 September 1852 in response while they was still under construction. The ships only differed in small ways and Princess Royal measured 217 feet (66.1 m) on the gun deck and 179 feet 3 inches (54.6 m) on the keel. She had a beam of 58 feet 2 inches (17.7 m), a depth of hold of 24 feet (7.3 m), a deep draught of 26 feet 6 inches (8.1 m) and had a tonnage of 3,130 tons burthen. Princess Royal was fitted with a single-expansion steam engine that was rated at 400 nominal horsepower (nhp) and drove a single propeller shaft. During her sea trials in Stokes Bay on 2 November 1853, her boilers provided enough steam for the engine to produce 1,491 indicated horsepower (1,112 kW) that was good for a speed of 11 knots (20 km/h; 13 mph). Hannibal was fitted with a 450 nhp steam engine that had been taken from the frigate HMS Greenock. Her engine produced 1,071 ihp (799 kW) that was good for a speed of 8.6 knots (15.9 km/h; 9.9 mph) during her sea trials at the Nore on 12 April 1854, with some of her launching equipment still attached. To reduce drag and improve performance under sail, the ships could hoist their propellers into the hull and retract the telescoping funnel. Their crew numbered 850 officers and ratings. The ships' armament consisted of thirty-two 8-inch shell guns on their lower gun deck and thirty-four 32-pounder (56 cwt) guns on their upper gun deck. Between their forecastle and quarterdeck, she carried twenty-four 32-pounder (42 cwt) guns and a single 68-pounder gun on a pivot mount.

== Ships ==
Construction data
Ship	Builder	Ordered	Laid down	Launched	Completed	Fate
Princess Royal	HM Dockyard, Portsmouth	12 March 1840	February 1841	23 June 1853	11 March 1854	Sold for scrap, 7 December 1872
Hannibal	HM Dockyard, Deptford	12 March 1840	December 1848	31 January 1854	22 June 1854	Sold for scrap, 12 April 1904

== Service history ==
The Princess Royal class were ordered as Albion-class ships of the line on 12 March 1840, although Princess Royal was originally named Prince Albert. Her name was changed to Princess Royal on 26 March 1842, but she was re-ordered on 15 April 1847 to a modified John Edye design. Hannibal had not been laid down by then and she was reordered to a lengthened version of Edye's design on 19 June of the same year. The sisters was reordered again as screw-powered ships on 23 September 1852. Hannibal's conversion began that same day, although it took longer to finish that her sister's. Princess Royal's conversion was ordered on 30 October and work began on 15 November.

She was briefly the flagship of the Baltic Fleet before the fleet departed Britain for the Baltic Sea in March. While moving through Køge Bay, Denmark, on 1 April, Princess Royal and the third rate Cressy accidentally collided with each other, neither much damaged. The fleet departed the bay on 12 April to blockade the exit from the Baltic. The French fleet rendezvoused with the British at Barö Sound, Grand Duchy of Finland, on 13 June. Princess Royal spent the rest of the year based at Nargen (modern Naissaar) Island where she could blockade the exit from the Gulf of Finland. Bad weather forced the fleet to withdraw to Kiel, Germany, from Nargen on 19 October, from where they could still blockade the exit from the Baltic. The bulk of the fleet was back home before 24 December.

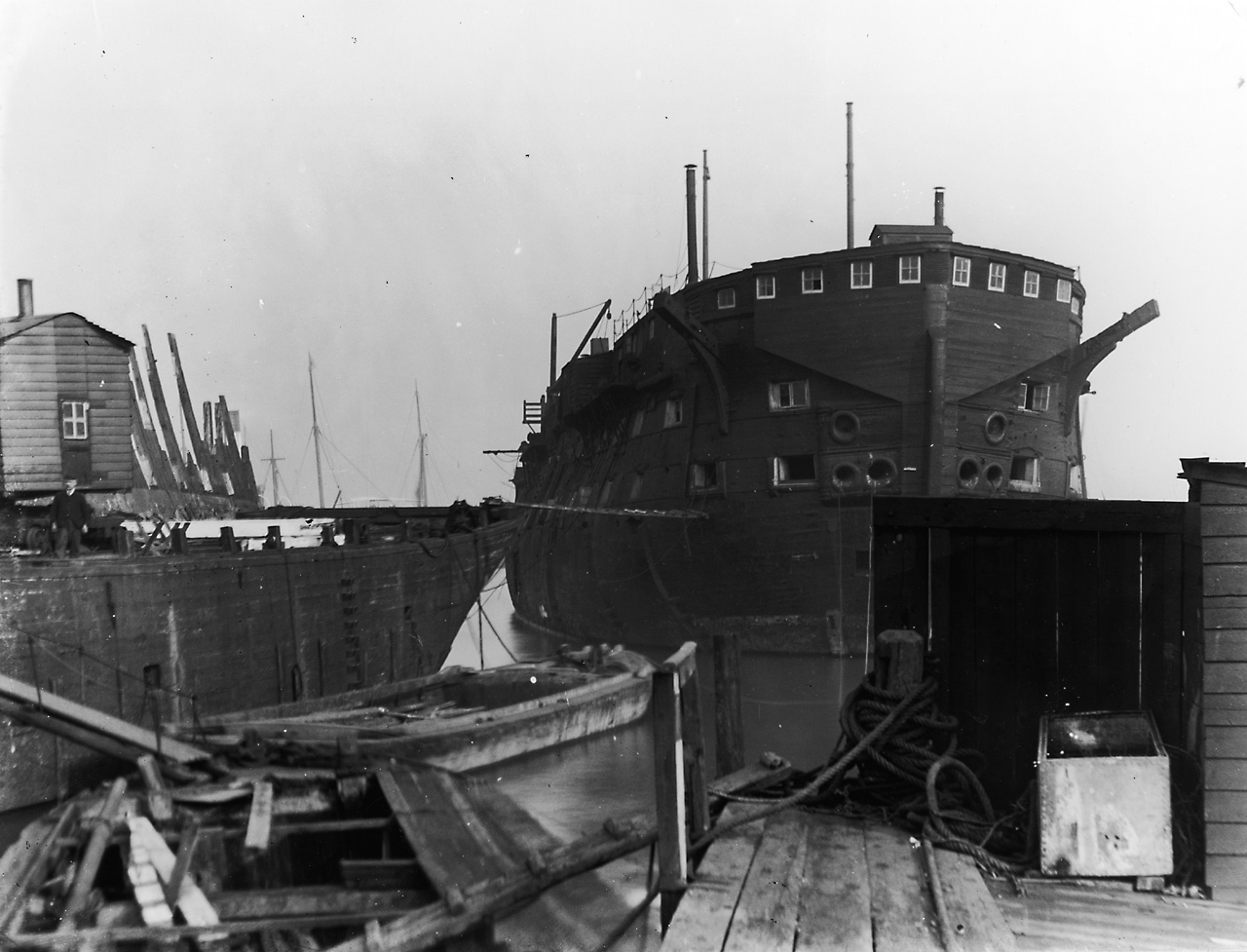
Hannibal in Castles Yard, Charlton, for scrapping

Hannibal served as a troop transport in June 1854, helping to ferry French troops to the Åland Islands; the ship off-loaded the guns from her lower gun deck to accommodate some of the French troops. After the Battle of Bomarsund in August, the ship helped to ferry 343 of the Russian prisoners back to Britain. She arrived off Sevastopol, Crimea, in December. By the time that her sister joined her in late January 1854, Hannibal was the flagship of Rear-Admiral Houston Stewart in the Black Sea. On 22 May, the sisters were part of the fleet that landed Allied troops near the city of Kerch. The Russian troops in the vicinity withdrew, demolishing the local defences and burning most of their supplies, allowing the Allies to occupy and loot Kerch and Yeni-Kale. The fleet then successfully attacked Taganrog on 3 June with Princess Royal contributing some boats and their crews to the attack. Princess Royal was the most heavily damaged Allied ship during the battle; she was hit three times, splinters from which wounded two crewmen. Hannibal did not participate in this attack, but was assigned to the June raid on Anapa that was forestalled by the evacuation of the Russian garrison.

Princess Royal returned from this expedition in time to participate in the ineffective preliminary bombardment of Sevastopol on 17 June to support the unsuccessful second Allied attack on the Great Redan the following day. She was hit several times and had one man killed, and wounded three others. The sisters then in the successful bombardment of the Kinburn Fortress, at the mouth of the Dnieper–Bug estuary, on 17 October. They departed from the Black Sea on 15 November, bound for the Mediterranean. They spent the first half of 1856 there, before they arrived at Portsmouth to be paid off.

Princess Royal was recommissioned that same year and returned to the Mediterranean. The ship returned home and was paid off in late 1859. The ship was recommissioned in early 21 January 1861 to serve as the flagship of Rear-Admiral Robert Smart, commander of the Channel Squadron. She was paid off on 30 April 1861 at Plymouth. Princess Royal was recommissioned in 1864 to serve as the flagship of Rear Admiral George St Vincent King in his role as Commander-in-Chief, East Indies and China Station. The ship returned home to be paid off in mid-1867. Princess Royal was sold for scrap to Henry Castle & Sons on 7 December and subsequently broken up at its facility in Charlton, London.

Hannibal was recommissioned in 1858 by Captain George Hastings as the guard ship at Portsmouth. The ship was transferred to the Mediterranean Fleet as the flagship of the second-in-command, Rear-Admiral Rodney Mundy the following year. During Giuseppe Garibaldi's Expedition of the Thousand, Hannibal was present during the Siege of Palermo, Sicily, in May 1860 to protect British citizens and property. The ship was paid off on 24 December 1861. Hannibal was recommissioned in 1863 to serve as a depot ship in Portsmouth. The ship was replaced by Duke of Wellington shortly afterwards, but became a part of Duke of Wellington's establishment. She was hulked in 1884 and sold for scrap to Henry Castle & Sons in 1904.
