= HMS Orion (1854) =

Ship of the line of the Royal Navy

History

United Kingdom
- Name: Orion
- Namesake: Orion
- Ordered: 30 March 1848
- Builder: Chatham Dockyard
- Laid down: 1 February 1850
- Launched: 6 November 1854
- Completed: 29 March 1855
- Commissioned: 11 January 1855
- Out of service: 9 November 1861
- Fate: Scrapped, 4 July 1867

General characteristics (as built)
- Class & type: 91-gun, second-rate Orion-class ship of the line
- Tons burthen: 3,281 bm
- Length: 238 ft 2 in (72.6 m) (gun deck)
- Beam: 55 ft 10 in (17 m)
- Draught: 26 ft 10 in (8.2 m) (deep load)
- Depth of hold: 24 ft (7.3 m)
- Installed power: 2,329 ihp (1,737 kW)
- Propulsion: 1 screw; 1 trunk steam engine
- Sail plan: Full-rigged ship
- Speed: 11.5 knots (21.3 km/h; 13.2 mph)
- Complement: 860
- Armament: 91 muzzle-loading, smoothbore guns: Lower deck: 34 × 8 in (203 mm) shell guns; Upper deck: 34 × 32 pdr guns; Quarter deck & Forecastle: 22 × 32 pdrs + 1 × 68 pdr

HMS Orion was the lead ship of her class of 91-gun, second rate ships of the line built for the Royal Navy (RN) during the 1850s, the last sailing ships of the line ordered for the RN. She was converted to screw-power while under construction. Completed in 1855, the ship played a minor role with the Baltic Fleet during the Crimean War of 1854–1856 against the Russian Empire. Orion was assigned to the North America and West Indies Station after the war. She served as a flagship for the Channel Fleet before she was transferred to the Mediterranean Fleet in 1859. Two years later the ship was paid off as unseasoned timber used to expedite her completion during the war had begun to rot. Orion was sold for scrap in 1867 and subsequently broken up.

== Background and description ==
The Orion-class ships were originally ordered as 80-gun, Vanguard-class ships of the line, but the design of their hull was significantly revised by the Assistant Surveyors of the Navy, John Edye and Isaac Watts. The ships were intended to measure 198 feet (60.4 m) at the gun deck and 161 feet 1 inch (49.1 m) at the keel. They would have had a beam of 55 feet 9 inches (17.0 m), a depth of hold of 23 feet 4 inches (7.1 m) and had a tonnage of 2,600 1/94 tons burthen. Their crew would have numbered 720 officers and ratings. The ships had the usual three-masted full-ship rig. Their muzzle-loading, smoothbore armament was intended to consist of twenty 32-pounder (56 cwt) guns (Note: "Cwt" is the abbreviation for hundredweight, 56 cwt referring to the weight of the gun.) and eight 8 in (203 mm) (65 cwt) shell guns on the lower gun deck. The upper gun deck was intended to have had twenty-four 50 cwt, 32-pounder and four 8-inch shell guns. Between their forecastle and quarterdeck, the ships would have carried twenty-four 32-pounder (42 cwt) guns.

=== Screw conversion ===
Completion of the French fast steam-powered, second-rate Napoléon in early 1852 and the French preparations for building more like her caused an invasion scare that prompted the First Derby ministry to authorize a large programme of steam-powered ships of the line to maintain British naval superiority; thus initiating a naval arms race between France and Britain. Captain Baldwin Wake Walker, the Surveyor of the Navy, ordered Orion to be converted in 1852 in response while she was still under construction. She had to be lengthened by 40 feet (12.2 m) to incorporate a steam engine and a propeller. The ship measured 238 feet 2 inches (72.6 m) on the gundeck and 202 feet 9 inches (61.8 m) on the keel. She had a beam of 55 feet 10 inches (17 m), a depth of hold of 24 feet (7.3 m), a deep draught of 26 feet 10 inches (8.2 m) and had a tonnage of 3,281 tons burthen. The ship was fitted with a two-cylinder, trunk steam engine built by John Penn and Sons that was rated at 600 nominal horsepower and drove a single propeller shaft. To reduce drag and improve performance under sail, the ship could hoist her propeller into the hull and retract the telescoping funnel. Her boilers provided enough steam for the engine to produce 2,329 indicated horsepower (1,737 kW) that was good for a speed of 11.5 knots (21.3 km/h; 13.2 mph) during her sea trials in the Thames River on April 1855. Her crew numbered 860 officers and ratings.

The ship's armament consisted of thirty-four 8-inch shell guns on her lower gun deck and thirty-four 56 cwt, 32-pounder guns on her upper gun deck. Between her forecastle and quarterdeck, she carried twenty-two 32-pounder, 45 cwt guns and a single 68-pounder gun on a pivot mount.

== Construction and career ==
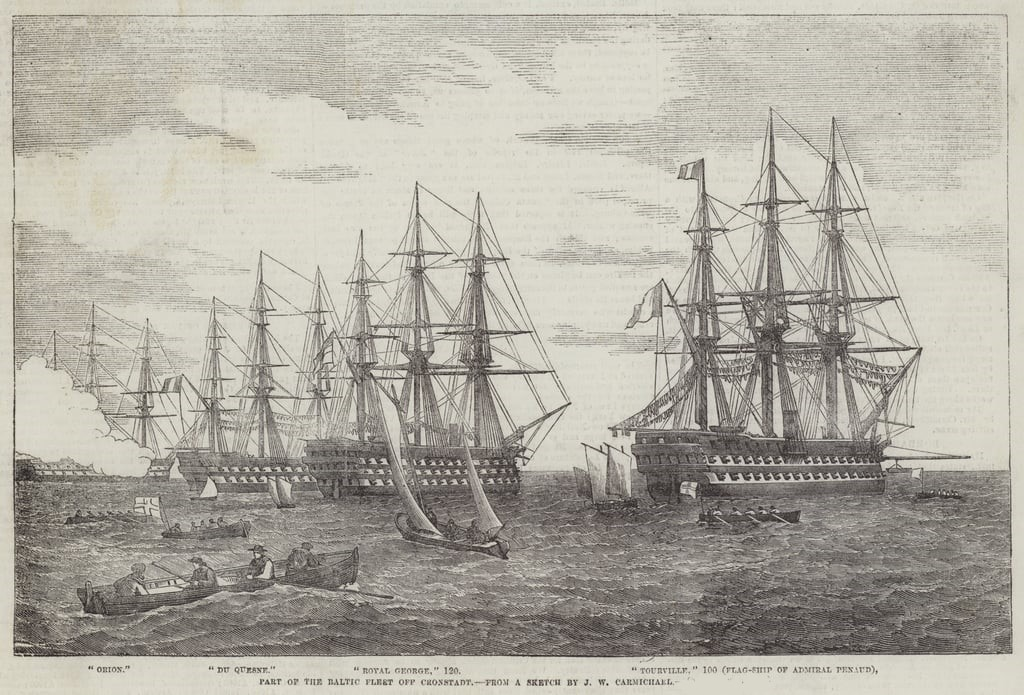
Part of the Baltic Fleet off Kronstadt, ships L-R; Orion; Du Quesne; Royal George; Tourville, flagship of Admiral Penaud. Illustrated London News, 1855

Named after the mythological hunter, Orion was the second ship of her name to serve in the RN. The ship was ordered as an 80-gun second rate on 30 March 1848 and laid down to a modified design at Chatham Dockyard on 1 February 1850; together with her sister ship, HMS Hood, they were the last sailing ships of the line to be laid down for the RN. With the advent of steam propulsion in warship design, she was reordered on 30 October 1852. Her stern had to be partially launched to allow the hull to be lengthened and the official launching occurred on 6 November 1854. Orion was commissioned by Captain John Elphinstone Erskine on 18 January 1855 and completed for sea on 29 March. During the Crimean War, the ship was assigned to the Baltic Fleet, the main body of which departed The Downs on 9 April and arrived at Kiel, Germany, nine days later. The fleet left Kiel on 3 May and reached their intended anchorage at Nargen Island in the Estonian Governorate a week later. Orion was detailed to inspect the fortress of Kronstadt, the principal Russian naval base in the Baltic on 27 May. Erskine, confused by the hazy weather, erroneously reported that the Russian fleet was anchored outside the harbour. The main body of the fleet arrived for a more thorough reconnaissance four days later, but the defences were found to be beyond the capabilities of the allied forces. The bulk of the fleet withdrew from the Gulf of Finland on 11 November, Orion remaining behind to support the remaining ships. She reached Kiel on 29 October. The ship was transferred to the North America and West Indies Station in 1856 and returned home to be paid off on 1 October 1857.

Captain Edwin Tennyson-d'Eyncourt recommissioned Orion on 3 June 1858, serving as the flagship of Rear-Admiral Charles Fremantle of the Channel Fleet. Captain Tennyson-d'Eyncourt was relieved by Captain Wallace Houston on 27 January 1859 and she was transferred to the Mediterranean Fleet. Houston was relieved in his turn by Captain John Frere on 22 June. Captain William de Vere assumed command on 7 October 1861 until the ship was paid off on 9 November. She was in ordinary at Sheerness Dockyard from 1862 to 1866. During this time her armament was reduced to 89 guns by 1862 and later to 79 guns. Orion had been hastily built to finish her in time to participate in the Crimean War and her timbers rotted quickly. The ship was sold for scrap in April 1867 to Henry Castle & Sons and she arrived at Charlton, London, on 4 July 1867 to begin demolition.

== Bibliography ==
- Clowes, William Laird (1901). The Royal Navy: A History from the Earliest Times to the Present. Vol. VI. Sampson Low, Marston.
- Colledge, J. J.; Warlow, Ben & Bush, Steve (2020). Ships of the Royal Navy: The Complete Record of all Fighting Ships of the Royal Navy from the 15th Century to the Present (5th revised and updated ed.). Seaforth Publishing. ISBN 978-1-5267-9327-0.
- Lambert, Andrew D. (1984). Battleships in Transition: The Creation of the Steam Battlefleet 1815-1860. Conway Maritime Press. ISBN 0-85177-315-X.
- Lambert, Andrew (2011) [1990]. The Crimean War: British Grand Strategy Against Russia, 1853–56 (Second ed.). Ashgate. ISBN 978-1-4094-1011-9.
- Manning, T. D. & Walker, C. F. (1959). British Warship Names. Putnam. OCLC 838607.
- Winfield, Rif (2014). British Warships in the Age of Sail 1817–1863: Design, Construction, Careers and Fates. Seaforth Publishing. ISBN 978-1-84832-169-4.
