= HMS Princess Royal (1853) =

Ship of the line of the Royal Navy

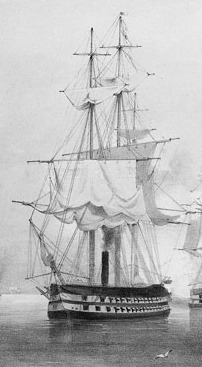
- Princess Royal

History

United Kingdom
- Name: Princess Royal
- Ordered: 12 March 1840
- Builder: HM Dockyard, Portsmouth
- Laid down: February 1841
- Launched: 23 June 1853
- Commissioned: 29 October 1853
- Decommissioned: 14 August 1867
- Renamed: From Prince Albert, 26 March 1842
- Fate: Sold for scrap, 7 December 1872

General characteristics (as completed)
- Class & type: 91-gun, second rate, Princess Royal-class ship of the line
- Tons burthen: 3,130 bm
- Length: 217 ft (66.1 m) (overall)
- Beam: 58 ft 2 in (17.7 m)
- Draught: 26 ft 6 in (8.1 m)
- Depth of hold: 24 ft (7.3 m)
- Installed power: Boilers; 1,492 ihp (1,113 kW)
- Propulsion: 1 screw; 1 single-expansion steam engine
- Sail plan: Full-rigged ship
- Speed: 11 knots (20 km/h; 13 mph)
- Complement: 850
- Armament: 91 muzzle-loading, smoothbore guns: Lower deck: 32 × 8 in (203 mm) shell guns; Upper deck: 34 × 32 pdr guns; Quarter deck & Forecastle: 24 × 32 pdrs + 1 × 68 pdr gun

HMS Princess Royal was the lead ship of her class of 91-gun, second-rate, ships of the line built for the Royal Navy (RN) in the 1850s. The ship was converted to screw power while under construction. Completed in 1854, she participated in the Crimean War of 1854–1856 against the Russian Empire. Princess Royal was assigned to the Baltic Fleet in 1854 and was transferred to the Mediterranean Fleet the following year for service in the Black Sea. The ship played a minor role in the Siege of Sevastopol (1854–1855) and participated in the Battle of Kinburn. She subsequently served as a flagship for the Channel Squadron and the East Indies and China Station. Princess Royal was paid off upon her return home in 1867 and was sold for scrap in 1872.

== Background and description ==
Princess Royal was originally ordered in 1840 as an Albion-class ship of the line and was laid down the following year. She was intended to measure 204 feet (62.2 m) at the gun deck and 165 feet 11 inches (50.6 m) at the keel. She would have had a beam of 60 feet (18.3 m), a depth of hold of 23 feet 8 inches (7.2 m) and had a tonnage of 3,083 12/94 tons burthen. Her crew would have numbered 750 officers and ratings in peacetime and 820 at war. The ship had the usual three-masted full-ship rig. Princess Royal's muzzle-loading, smoothbore armament was intended to consist of twenty-eight 32-pounder (56 cwt) guns (Note: "Cwt" is the abbreviation for hundredweight, 56 cwt referring to the weight of the gun.) and four 8 in (203 mm) (65 cwt) shell guns on the lower gun deck. The upper gun deck was planned to have had twenty-six 56 cwt, 32-pounders and six 8-inch shell guns. Between her forecastle and quarterdeck, the ship would have carried twenty-four 32-pounder (42 cwt) guns and a pair of 8-inch, 52 cwt, shell guns.

Construction was slow with work being suspended twice before she was reordered to a modified design by the Assistant Surveyor of the Navy, John Edye, in 1847 to eliminate the deep hull shape preferred by the Surveyor of the Navy, William Symonds, who was now out of favour with the Board of Admiralty, in 1847. The half-built ship was dismantled to allow her hull be modified accordingly. The ship's length at the gun deck did not change, but her length at the keel increased to 166 feet 7 inches (50.8 m). Her beam was decreased to 58 feet (17.7 m), her depth of hold increased to 24 feet (7.3 m) and her tonnage was reduced to 2,896 25/94 tons burthen. The ship's armament and crew size did not change.

=== Screw conversion ===
Completion of the French fast steam-powered, second-rate Napoléon in early 1852 and the French preparations for building more like her caused an invasion scare that prompted the First Derby ministry to authorize a large programme of steam-powered ships of the line to maintain British naval superiority, thus initiating a naval arms race between France and Britain. Captain Baldwin Wake Walker, the new Surveyor of the Navy, ordered Princess Royal to be converted in 1852 in response while she was still under construction. The ship measured 217 feet (66.1 m) on the gun deck and 179 feet 3 inches (54.6 m) on the keel. She had a beam of 58 feet 2 inches (17.7 m), a depth of hold of 24 feet (7.3 m), a deep draught of 26 feet 6 inches (8.1 m) and had a tonnage of 3,130 tons burthen. Princess Royal was fitted with a horizontal, two-cylinder, single-expansion steam engine built by Maudslay, Sons and Field that was rated at 400 nominal horsepower and drove a single propeller shaft. During her sea trials in Stokes Bay on 2 November 1853, her boilers provided enough steam for the engine to produce 1,491 indicated horsepower (1,112 kW) that was good for a speed of 11 knots (20 km/h; 13 mph). To reduce drag and improve performance under sail, the ship could hoist her propeller into the hull and retract the telescoping funnel. Her crew numbered 850 officers and ratings.

The ship's armament consisted of thirty-two 8-inch shell guns on her lower gun deck and thirty-four 32-pounder (56 cwt) guns on her upper gun deck. Between her forecastle and quarterdeck, she carried twenty-four 32-pounder (42 cwt) guns and a single 68-pounder gun on a pivot mount.

== Construction and career ==
Named after the title sometimes conferred upon the eldest daughter of the monarch, Princess Royal was the third ship of her name to serve in the RN. She was ordered as a 90-gun, second-rate Albion-class ship of the line on 12 March 1840 under the name of Prince Albert and she was laid down at HM Dockyard, Portsmouth, in February 1841. Her name was changed to Princess Royal on 26 March 1842, but she was re-ordered on 15 April 1847 to a modified John Edye design. The ship was reordered again as a screw-powered, 90-gun, second rate on 23 September 1852. The conversion was ordered on 30 October and work began on 15 November which included inserting a 9-foot (2.7 m) section into the ship's middle to accommodate the steam engine. She was launched on 23 June 1853 and was commissioned by Captain Lord Clarence Paget on 29 October 1853. Paget had great difficulties finding seamen for his ship. Princess Royal had run aground on 27 February 1854 while conducting her sea trials in Stoke Bay when Vice-Admiral Sir Charles Napier, commander of the Baltic Fleet, came aboard to hoist his flag aboard, much to Paget's chagrin. The ship was completed for sea on 11 March, just in time to depart for the Baltic Sea from Spithead with the main body of the fleet.

While moving through Køge Bay, Denmark, on 1 April, Princess Royal and the 80-gun Cressy accidentally collided with each other, neither much damaged. The fleet departed the bay on 12 April to blockade the exit from the Baltic. The French fleet rendezvoused with the British at Barö Sound, Finland, on 13 June. Princess Royal spent the rest of the year based at Nargen (modern Naissaar) Island where she could blockade the exit from the Gulf of Finland. Bad weather forced the fleet to withdraw to Kiel, Germany, from Nargen on 19 October, from where they could still blockade the exit from the Baltic. The bulk of the fleet was back home before 24 December.

For the 1855 campaign, the ship was transferred to the Mediterranean Fleet, arriving in the Black Sea at the end of January. On 22 May, the ship was part of the fleet that landed Allied troops near the city of Kerch. The Russian troops in the vicinity withdrew, demolishing the local defences and burning most of their supplies, allowing the Allies to occupy and loot Kerch and Yeni-Kale. The fleet then successfully attacked Taganrog on 3 June with Princess Royal contributing some boats and their crews to the attack. Princess Royal was the most heavily damaged Allied ship during the battle; she was hit three times, splinters from which wounded two crewmen. The ship returned from this expedition in time to participate in the ineffective preliminary bombardment of Sevastopol on 17 June to support the unsuccessful second Allied attack on the Great Redan the following day. She was hit several times and had one man killed, and wounded three others. Paget was invalided home in July and he was replaced by Captain Lewis Jones on 13 August. She participated in the successful bombardment of the Kinburn Fortress, at the mouth of the Dnieper–Bug estuary, on 17 October. Princess Royal departed from the Black Sea on 15 November, bound for the Mediterranean. She spent the first half of 1856 there, before she arrived at Portsmouth on 28 July to be paid off.

The ship was recommissioned the following day by Captain George Giffard and returned to the Mediterranean. He was relieved by Captain Thomas Baillie on 6 February 1858. Princess Royal returned home and was paid off on 5 December 1859. The ship was recommissioned by Captain Charles Fellowes on 21 January 1861 to serve as the flagship of Rear-Admiral Robert Smart, commander of the Channel Squadron. She was paid off on 30 April 1861 at Plymouth. Princess Royal was recommissioned on 12 February 1864 by Captain William Gore Jones to serve as the flagship of Rear Admiral George St Vincent King in his role as Commander-in-Chief, East Indies and China Station.

In 1865, Princess Royal conveyed Sir Harry Smith Parkes, accompanied by a detachment of Royal Marines, to the treaty port of Yokohama on his appointment as envoy to Japan. Admiral of the Fleet Lord Walter Kerr served as a lieutenant on board Princess Royal during the ship's deployment to Japan. The ship returned home to be paid off on 14 August 1867. She was docked at HM Dockyard, Devonport in August–September 1872, to have her copper sheathing removed. Princess Royal was sold for scrap to Henry Castle & Sons on 7 December and subsequently broken up at its facility in Charlton, London.
