= HMS Conqueror (1855) =

Ship of the line of the Royal Navy

Coordinates: 23°38′30″N 74°48′0″W

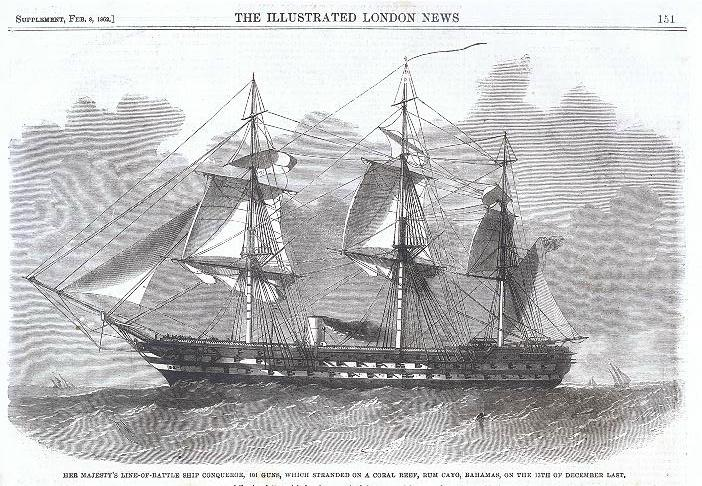
- A line drawing of Conqueror from The Illustrated London News, 1862

History

United Kingdom
- Name: Conqueror
- Ordered: 27 March 1852
- Builder: Devonport Dockyard
- Laid down: 25 July 1853
- Launched: 2 May 1855
- Completed: 9 April 1856
- Commissioned: 30 November 1855
- Fate: Wrecked, 29 December 1861

General characteristics
- Class & type: Conqueror-class ship of the line
- Tons burthen: 3,224 64/94 (bm)
- Length: 240 ft (73.2 m) (gun deck)
- Beam: 55 ft 4 in (16.9 m)
- Draught: 21 ft 2 in (6.5 m) (light)
- Depth of hold: 24 ft 5 in (7.44 m)
- Installed power: Boilers; 2,812 ihp (2,097 kW)
- Propulsion: 1 shaft; 1 trunk steam engine
- Speed: 10.8 knots (20.0 km/h; 12.4 mph)
- Complement: 830
- Armament: 101 muzzle-loading guns guns; Lower gun deck: 36 × 8 in (203 mm) shell guns; Upper gun deck: 36 × 32 pdr guns; Forecastle & Quarterdeck: 22 × 32 pdr guns + 1 × 68 pdr gun

HMS Conqueror was the lead ship of her class of 101-gun, screw-propelled, second-rate ships of the line built for the Royal Navy in the 1850s. Completed in 1856, the ship served with the Channel Squadron and the Mediterranean Fleet before she was wrecked on Rum Cay in what was then the British Bahamas in 1861. Her wreck is a popular dive site.

== Background and description ==
Completion of the French fast steam-powered, second-rate Napoléon in early 1852 and the French preparations for building more like her caused an invasion scare that prompted the First Derby ministry to authorize a large programme of steam-powered ships of the line to maintain British naval superiority; thus initiating a naval arms race between France and Britain. Captain Baldwin Wake Walker, the Surveyor of the Navy, ordered the Conqueror class as an slightly lengthened version of HMS St Jean d'Acre. Conqueror measured 240 feet (73.2 m) on the gun deck and 204 feet 1 inch (62.2 m) on the keel. She had a beam of 55 feet 4 inches (16.9 m), a depth of hold of 24 feet 5 inches (7.4 m), a light draught of 18 feet 1 inch (5.51 m) and had a tonnage of 3,223 64/94 tons burthen. Her crew numbered 930 officers and ratings.

The ships were equipped with a two-cylinder, trunk steam engine built by John Penn and Sons that was rated at 800 nominal horsepower and drove a single propeller shaft. During Conqueror's sea trials on 12 June 1856, her boilers provided enough steam for the engine to produce 2,812 indicated horsepower (2,097 kW) that was good for a speed of 10.8 knots (20.0 km/h; 12.4 mph). The ships were fitted with three masts and were ship-rigged. To reduce drag and improve performance under sail, the ship could hoist her propeller into the hull and retract the telescoping funnel.

The Conqueror-class ships were armed with 101 muzzle-loading, smoothbore guns that consisted of thirty-six 8 in (203 mm) shell guns on their lower gun deck and thirty-six 32-pounder (56 cwt) guns (Note: "Cwt" is the abbreviation for hundredweight, 56 cwt referring to the weight of the gun.) on their upper gun deck. Between the forecastle and quarterdeck, the Conquerors carried twenty-eight 32-pounder (45 cwt) guns. The single 68-pounder gun was positioned on the forecastle as a pivot gun so that it could serve as a bow chaser.

== Construction and career ==
Conqueror was the fifth ship of her name to serve with the RN. She was ordered on 27 March 1852 to a design from the Surveyor's Department, but her design was revised to use the lines of St Jean d'Acre on 15 November, albeit lengthened by 2 feet (0.6 m). The ship was laid down on 25 July 1853 at Devonport Dockyard and launched on 2 May 1855. Conqueror was commissioned on 30 November by Captain Thomas Symonds. For the 1856 campaign season, the ship was intended to allocated to the Baltic, but this was forestalled by the signing of the Treaty of Paris (1856) that ended the war in March. She was completed on 9 April 1856 for service with the Channel Squadron. Symonds was relieved by Captain Hastings Yelverton on 12 July and subsequently transferred to the Mediterranean Fleet.

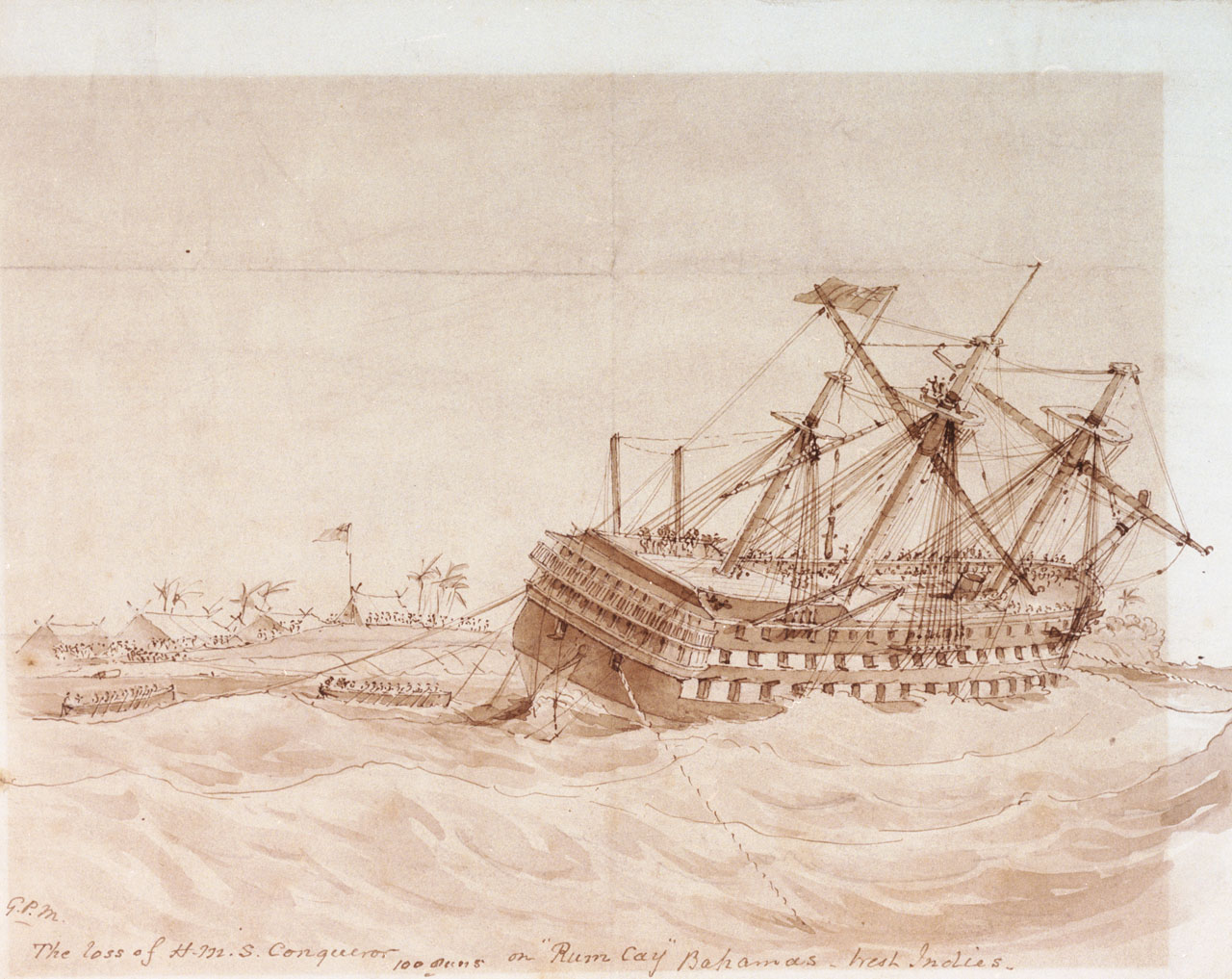
A drawing of the attempted salvage of Conqueror on Rum Cay, Bahamas, by Captain George Pechell Mends

Yelverton was succeeded by Captain William Clifford on 22 July 1859, and was relieved in his turn by Captain James Willcox in December at Devonport. Captain Edward Sotheby replaced Willcox in January 1860 and the ship rejoined the Channel Squadron. In November 1861 she was used to transport Royal Marines during the Second French intervention in Mexico along with her sister Donegal and Sans Pareil. After unloading her troops in Jamaica on mid-November, the ship set sail for Bermuda through the Bahamas on 27 December. Two days later, Conqueror struck a reef on Rum Cay before dawn; her crew's efforts to get the ship off were unsuccessful and her anchors were deployed to prevent her from going further aground. The rising swell of the ocean the following day broke the anchor cables and the ship swung sideways to the reef. The movement increased her flooding and her crew was ordered to focus on unloading her guns and stores. All of the crew survived and were rescued. The subsequent court-martial attributed the wreck to a navigation error due to a strong southerly current that was not appreciated by either the ship's sailing master or her officer of the watch.

Attempts to salvage the ship were unsuccessful and the ship's wreckage lies scattered in 30 feet (9.1 m) of water off Rum Cay. The wreck is preserved as an Underwater Museum of the Bahamas and is a popular dive site.
