= Orion-class ship of the line =

Class overview
- Name: Orion
- Builders: HM Dockyard, Chatham
- Operators: Royal Navy
- Preceded by: HMS Algiers
- Succeeded by: Princess Royal class
- Built: 1841–1859
- Completed: 2
- Scrapped: 2

General characteristics (Orion as built)
- Type: 91-gun, second-rate ship of the line
- Tons burthen: 3,350bm
- Length: 238 ft (72.5 m) (gun deck)
- Beam: 55 ft 11 in (17 m)
- Draught: 26 ft 10 in (8.2 m) (deep load)
- Depth of hold: 24 ft (7.3 m)
- Installed power: 2,385 ihp (1,778 kW)
- Propulsion: 1 screw; 1 trunk steam engine
- Sail plan: Full-rigged ship
- Speed: 11.7 knots (21.7 km/h; 13.5 mph)
- Complement: 860
- Armament: 91 muzzle-loading, smoothbore guns: Lower deck: 34 × 8 in (203 mm) shell guns; Upper deck: 34 × 32 pdr guns; Quarter deck & Forecastle: 22 × 32 pdrs + 1 × 68 pdr

The Orion class consisted of a pair of 91-gun, second-rate, ships of the line built for the Royal Navy (RN) during the 1850s, Orion and Hood. When they were ordered in 1848, they were the last sailing ships of the line to be laid down for the RN. The sisters were ordered to be converted into screw-propelled ships while under construction. Orion was the first of the sisters to do so, and was completed in 1855 during the Crimean War of 1854–1856 against the Russian Empire. She served in the Baltic Theatre during the war and was transferred to the North America and West Indies Station after the war ended in 1856. The ship was later a flagship in the Channel Squadron and then assigned to the Mediterranean Fleet, before being paid off for the final time in 1861. In poor condition due to the use of green timber during her building, Orion was sold for scrap in 1867.

Hood was converted after the war ended, but was not completed until 1859. The ship was never commissioned as she was placed in ordinary upon her completion. Hood was loaned to the British Army in 1872 to serve as a barracks ship. The ship was sold for scrap in 1888.

== Background and description ==
The Orion-class ship was originally designed as 80-gun Vanguard-class ship of the line in early 1848, but the design was reworked by the Assistant Surveyors of the Navy, John Edye and Isaac Watts, over the course of the year. They reshaped the hull, adding eight feet (2.4 m) to the length and was one foot (0.3 m) narrower than the Vanguard class. The ships were intended to measure 198 feet (60.4 m) at the gun deck and 161 feet 1 inch (49.1 m) at the keel. They would have had a beam of 55 feet 9 inches (17.0 m), a depth of hold of 23 feet 4 inches (7.1 m) and had a tonnage of 2,600 1/94 tons burthen. Their crew would have numbered 720 officers and ratings. The ships had the usual three-masted full-ship rig. Their muzzle-loading, smoothbore armament was intended to consist of twenty 32-pounder (56 cwt) guns (Note: "Cwt" is the abbreviation for hundredweight, 56 cwt referring to the weight of the gun.) and eight 8 in (203 mm) (65 cwt) shell guns on the lower gun deck. The upper gun deck was intended to have had twenty-four 50 cwt, 32-pounder and four 8-inch shell guns. Between their forecastle and quarterdeck, the ships would have carried twenty-four 32-pounder (42 cwt) guns. The ships were the last sailing ships of the line to be laid down by the RN.

=== Screw conversion ===
Completion of the French fast steam-powered, second-rate Napoléon in early 1852 and the French preparations for building more like her caused an invasion scare that prompted the First Derby ministry to authorize a large programme of steam-powered ships of the line to maintain British naval superiority; thus initiating a naval arms race between France and Britain. Captain Baldwin Wake Walker, the Surveyor of the Navy, ordered Orion to be converted on 30 October 1852 in response while she was still under construction. She had to be lengthened by 40 feet (12.2 m) to incorporate a steam engine and a propeller. The ship measured 238 feet 2 inches (72.6 m) on the gundeck and 202 feet 9 inches (61.8 m) on the keel. She had a beam of 55 feet 10 inches (17 m), a depth of hold of 24 feet (7.3 m), a deep draught of 26 feet 10 inches (8.2 m) and had a tonnage of 3,281 tons burthen. The ship was fitted with a two-cylinder, trunk steam engine built by John Penn and Sons that was rated at 600 nominal horsepower and drove a single propeller shaft. To reduce drag and improve performance under sail, the ship could hoist her propeller into the hull and retract the telescoping funnel. Her boilers provided enough steam for the engine to produce 2,329 indicated horsepower (1,737 kW) that was good for a speed of 11.5 knots (21.3 km/h; 13.2 mph) during her sea trials in the Thames River in April 1855. Her crew numbered 860 officers and ratings.

The ship's armament consisted of thirty-four 8-inch shell guns on her lower gun deck and thirty-four 56 cwt, 32-pounder guns on her upper gun deck. Between her forecastle and quarterdeck, she carried twenty-two 32-pounder, 45 cwt guns and a single 68-pounder gun on a pivot mount.

The arms race between France and Britain in screw-propelled ships of the line resumed after the Crimean War ended in 1856 and Walker ordered Hood to be converted on 9 April of that year. She was generally identical to her sister, but her stern was modified to improve the water flow to the screw and she was slightly larger.

== Ships ==
Construction data
Ship	Builder	Ordered	Laid down	Launched	Completed	Fate
Orion	HM Dockyard, Chatham	30 March 1848	1 February 1850	6 November 1854	29 March 1855	Sold for scrap, April 1867
Hood	HM Dockyard, Chatham	30 March 1848	13 August 1849	4 May 1859	15 June 1859	Sold for scrap, 1888

== Service history ==
Commissioned in 1855, Orion played a minor role with the Baltic Fleet during the war and was assigned to the North America and West Indies Station afterwards. The ship was paid off in 1867, but was recommissioned the following year for service as a flagship for the Channel Squadron. She was transferred to the Mediterranean Fleet in 1859. Two years later the ship was paid off as unseasoned timber used to expedite her completion during the war had begun to rot. Orion was sold for scrap in 1867 and subsequently broken up.

Hood was never commissioned and was placed in ordinary immediately upon completion, remaining in that status until 1870. She was loaned to the British Army to serve as a barracks ship at Woolwich in 1872. The ship was sold for scrap in 1888.
