= HMS St Jean d'Acre =

Ship of the line of the Royal Navy

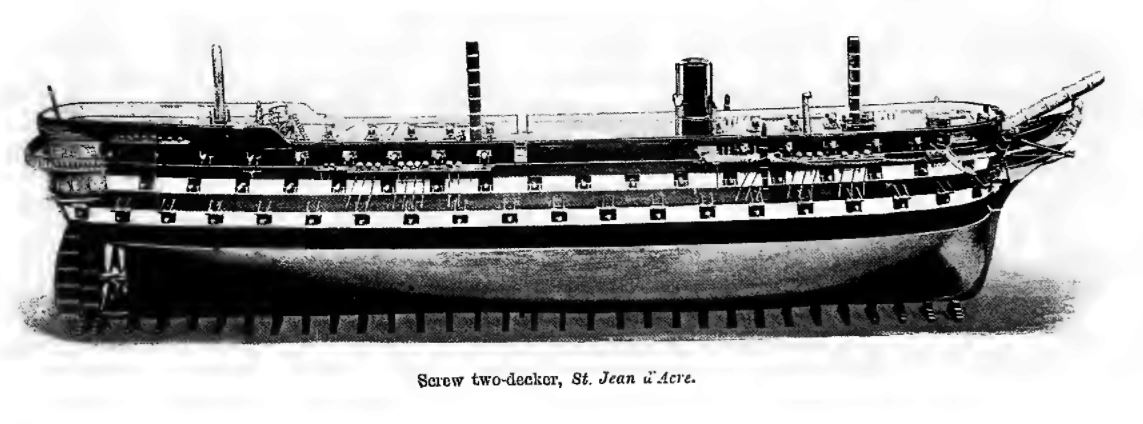
- A model of St Jean d'Acre

Class overview
- Name: St Jean d'Acre
- Operators: Royal Navy
- Preceded by: Agamemnon class
- Succeeded by: Conqueror class
- Completed: 1
- Scrapped: 1

History

United Kingdom
- Name: St Jean d'Acre
- Ordered: 15 February 1851
- Builder: Devonport Dockyard
- Laid down: June 1851
- Launched: 23 March 1853
- Commissioned: 21 May 1853
- Out of service: 13 September 1861
- Fate: Sold for scrap, January 1875

General characteristics
- Type: 101-gun, second-rate, screw-powered ship of the line
- Displacement: 5,499 long tons (5,587 t)
- Tons burthen: 3,258 32/94 bm
- Length: 238 ft (72.5 m) (gun deck)
- Beam: 55 ft 4 in (16.9 m)
- Draught: 25 ft (7.6 m)
- Depth of hold: 24 ft 5 in (7.4 m)
- Installed power: 2,136 ihp (1,593 kW)
- Propulsion: 1 screw; 1 trunk steam engine
- Sail plan: Full-rigged ship
- Speed: 11.2 knots (20.7 km/h; 12.9 mph) (trials)
- Complement: 930
- Armament: 101 muzzle-loading, smoothbore guns: Lower deck: 36 × 8 in (203 mm) shell guns; Upper deck: 36 × 32 pdrs; Quarter deck & Forecastle: 28 × 32 pdrs; 1 × 68 pdr

HMS St Jean d'Acre was a 101-gun, screw-powered, second-rate ship of the line built for the Royal Navy (RN) in the 1850s; the only ship of her class. Completed in 1853, the ship was briefly assigned to the Channel Squadron before she was transferred to the Baltic Fleet after the beginning of the Crimean War in 1854. The following year St Jean d'Acre conveyed troops from Ireland to the Crimea and participated in the bombardment of Kinburn. After the war she took the British delegation to the coronation of Czar Alexander II in 1856 and was then paid off.

Recommissioned three years later, the ship was assigned to the Mediterranean Fleet. Paid off in 1861, St Jean d'Acre was sold for scrap in 1875.

== Background and description ==
Design work for St Jean d'Acre was ordered in early 1851 by the Surveyor of the Navy, Baldwin Wake Walker, in response to the revolutionary French 90-gun, screw-powered ship of the line, Napoléon. Walker wanted a more powerful ship and his assistants, John Edye and Isaac Watts, obliged with St Jean d'Acre, which was based on Edye's earlier 91-gun design, James Watt, lengthened to accommodate the 10 additional guns. The ship measured 238 feet (72.5 m) on the gun deck and 202 feet 5 inches (61.7 m) on the keel. She had a beam of 55 feet 4 inches (16.9 m), a depth of hold of 24 feet 5 inches (7.4 m), a deep draught of 25 feet (7.6 m). St Jean d'Acre had a tonnage of 3,258 32/94 tons burthen and displaced 5,499 long tons (5,587 t). The ship was fitted with a two-cylinder, trunk steam engine built by John Penn and Sons that was rated at 600 nominal horsepower and drove a single propeller shaft. During her sea trials on 3 December 1853 in Stokes Bay, St Jean d'Acre's boilers provided enough steam for the engine to produce 2,136 indicated horsepower (1,593 kW) that was good for a speed of 11.2 knots (20.7 km/h; 12.9 mph). Her crew numbered 930 officers and ratings.

St Jean d'Acre had three masts and was ship-rigged. To reduce drag and improve performance under sail, the ship could hoist her propeller into the hull and retract the telescoping funnel. She was regarded as very manoeuvrable for a steamship, able to match sailing ships in their ability to tack and wear with precision.

Her muzzle-loading, smoothbore armament consisted of thirty-six 8 in (203 mm) shell guns on the lower gun deck and thirty-six 32-pounder (56 cwt) guns (Note: "Cwt" is the abbreviation for hundredweight, 56 cwt referring to the weight of the gun.) on her upper gun deck. Between the forecastle and quarterdeck, St Jean d'Acre carried twenty-eight 32-pounder (45 cwt) guns. The single 68-pounder gun was positioned on the forecastle as a pivot gun so that it could serve as a bow chaser.

== Construction and career ==
St Jean d'Acre remains the only ship of her name to serve in the Royal Navy as of 2020. Her design was approved on 15 February 1851, and she was ordered that same day. Her keel was laid down at HM Dockyard, Devonport, in June 1851, using materials collected for a 90-gun, sailing Albion-class ship of the line of the same name, which was ordered in 1844, but suspended the following year before she was laid down. The Admiralty originally intended to equip St Jean d'Acre with the 700 nhp Robert Napier & Sons engine taken from the iron frigate Simoom, but a new engine was ordered instead. The ship was launched on 23 March 1853 and commissioned by Captain Henry Keppel on 21 May. She was completed on 20 September and was assigned to the Channel Squadron.

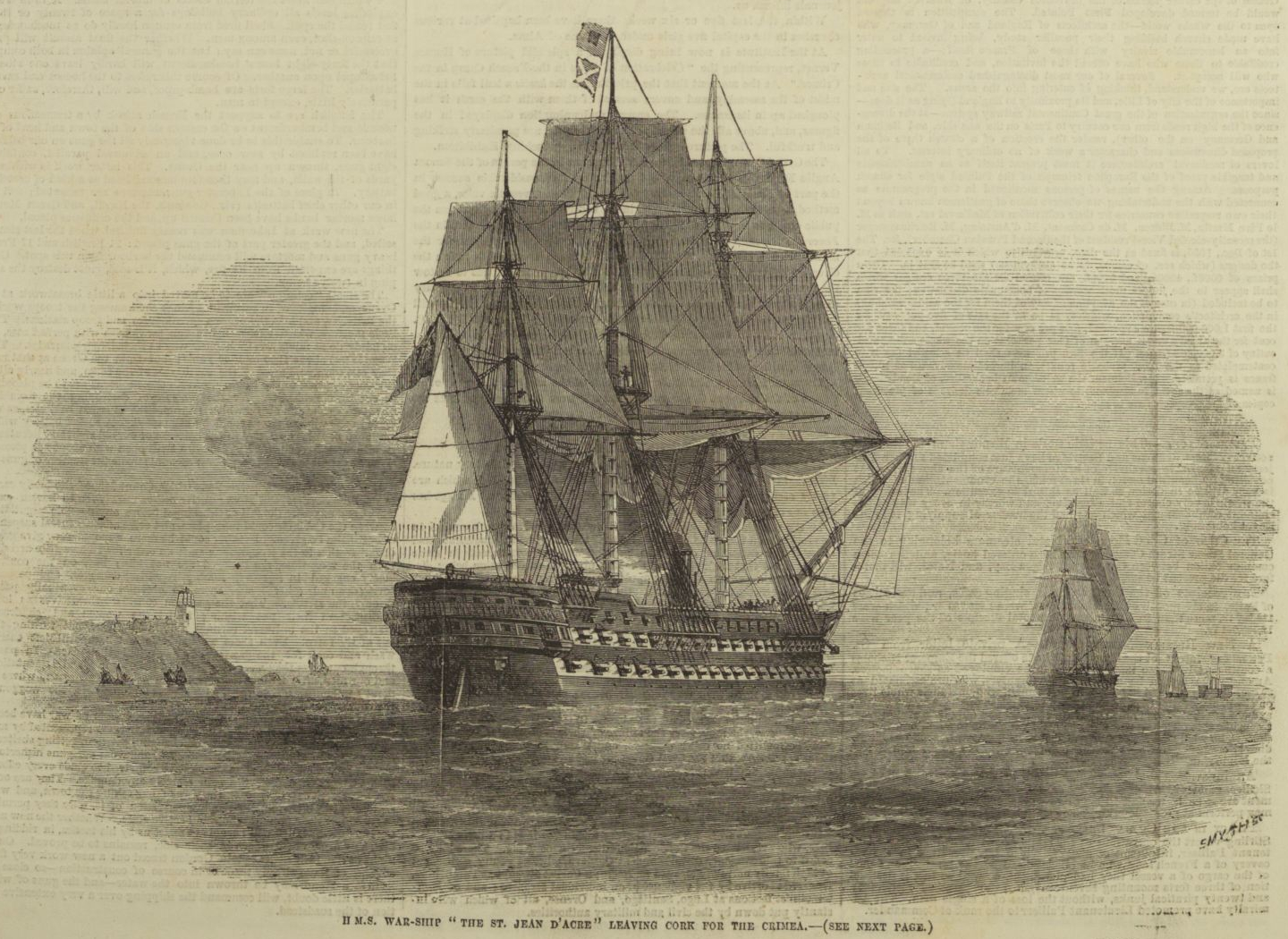
St Jean d'Acre leaving Cork for the Crimea, 1855.

In May 1854 she was assigned to the Baltic Fleet deploying against Russia in the Crimean War. The ship was part of the force based near Nargen Island (now Naissaar) blockading Reval (now Tallinn) and the southern coast of the Gulf of Finland by late 1854. By 19 October, bad weather had forced the ships to withdraw to Kiel, Germany, where they blockaded the entrance to the Baltic Sea until December when they were ordered home. Instead of paying off as expected at Devonport, she was ordered to Cork, Ireland, to load troops on 2 January 1855 and proceed to join the Mediterranean Fleet in the Black Sea, arriving on 30 January. On 22 May, the ship was part of the fleet that landed Allied troops near the city of Kerch. The Russian troops in the vicinity withdrew, demolishing the local defences and burning most of their supplies, allowing the Allies to occupy and loot Kerch and Yeni-Kale. On 7 July Captain George King relieved Keppel. While detached to the Naval Brigade at Sevastopol, Bosun's Mate John Sheppard attempted to penetrate Sevastopol Harbour using a punt that he built himself in order to attach an explosive device to a Russian warship on 15 July and 16 August, albeit unsuccessfully. St Jean d'Acre participated in the bombardment of the Kinburn Fortress, at the mouth of the Dnieper–Bug estuary, on 17 October, and the ship was ordered to return to the Mediterranean the following month.

In September 1856, St Jean d'Acre took Earl Granville to Saint Petersburg, Russia, to attend the coronation of Czar Alexander II in Moscow. Earl Granville was leader of the Liberal Party in the House of Lords. She was paid off on 21 October 1856 at Devonport. The ship was recommissioned on 4 February 1859 by Captain Thomas Pickering Thompson for service in the Mediterranean. He was invalided out of the service on 26 September 1860 and replaced by Captain Charles Elliot. St Jean d'Acre was paid off for the last time on 13 September 1861. She was reclassified as a 99-gun ship in 1862 and an 81-gun ship the following year. St Jean d'Acre was sold to Henry Castle & Sons in January 1875, left Devonport on 19 September and was broken up in October at Charlton, London.

== Bibliography ==
- Brazier, Kevin (2015). The Complete Victoria Cross: A Full Chronological Record of All Holders of Britain's Highest Award for Gallantry (Revised and Updated Paperback ed.). Pen & Sword Books. ISBN 978-1-47384-351-6.
- Clowes, William Laird (1901). The Royal Navy: A History from the Earliest Times to the Present. Vol. VI. Sampson Low, Marston.
- Colledge, J. J.; Warlow, Ben & Bush, Steve (2020). Ships of the Royal Navy: The Complete Record of all Fighting Ships of the Royal Navy from the 15th Century to the Present (5th revised and updated ed.). Seaforth Publishing. ISBN 978-1-5267-9327-0.
- Duckers, Peter (2011). The Crimean War at Sea: Naval Campaigns against Russia, 1854-56. Pen & Sword Maritime. ISBN 978-1-84884-267-0.
- Lambert, Andrew D. (1984). Battleships in Transition: The Creation of the Steam Battlefleet 1815–1860. Conway Maritime Press. ISBN 0-85177-315-X.
- Lambert, Andrew D. (1991). The Last Sailing Battlefleet: Maintaining Naval Mastery 1815 - 1850. Conway Maritime Press. ISBN 0-85177-591-8.
- Winfield, Rif (2014). British Warships in the Age of Sail 1817–1863: Design, Construction, Careers and Fates. Seaforth Publishing. ISBN 978-1-84832-169-4.
