= Lewis Jones (Royal Navy officer) =

Royal Navy admiral (1797–1895)

Admiral Sir Lewis Jones GCB
- Born: 24 December 1797; Birmingham, Warwickshire, England
- Died: 11 October 1895 (aged 97); Southsea, Hampshire, England
- Burial place: Fareham, Hampshire
- Military career
- Allegiance: United Kingdom
- Branch: Royal Navy
- Service years: 1808–1865
- Rank: Admiral
- Commands: HMS Penelope; HMS Sampson; HMS London; HMS Princess Royal; Queenstown
- Conflicts: Napoleonic Wars; War of 1812; Crimean War
- Awards: Knight Grand Cross of the Order of the Bath

Admiral Sir Lewis Tobias Jones GCB (24 December 1797 – 11 October 1895) was a Royal Navy officer who became Commander-in-Chief, Queenstown.

== Naval career ==
Jones became commanding officer of the fifth-rate HMS Penelope in December 1847 and commanding officer of the frigate HMS Sampson in December 1850. In HMS Sampson he saw action in the Black Sea during the Crimean War. He went on to be commanding officer of the second-rate HMS London in November 1854 and commanding officer of the second-rate HMS Princess Royal in August 1855. He went on to be Second-in-command, East Indies and China Station in September 1859 and Commander-in-Chief, Queenstown in March 1862 before he retired in March 1865. In retirement he was Governor of Greenwich Hospital.

Jones died on 11 October 1895 at his home Rugby House in Southsea and was buried in the family vault in the churchyard of Holy Trinity, Fareham.

Coat of arms of Lewis Jones

Notes
Confirmed 7 August 1873 by Sir John Bernard Burke, Ulster King of Arms.
Crest
A lion couchant Or armed and langued Gules charged on the shoulder with a trefoil slipped Vert.
Escutcheon
Per bend sinister Ermine and Ermines a lion rampant Or armed and langued Gules a bordure engrailed of the third.
Motto
Periculum Et Aliis Facito

Military offices
Preceded by Charles Talbot	Commander-in-Chief, Queenstown; 1862–1865	Succeeded by Charles Frederick
Preceded by Sir Sydney Dacres	Governor, Greenwich Hospital; 1884–1895	Succeeded by Post abolished
