= HMS Donegal (1858) =

UK ship

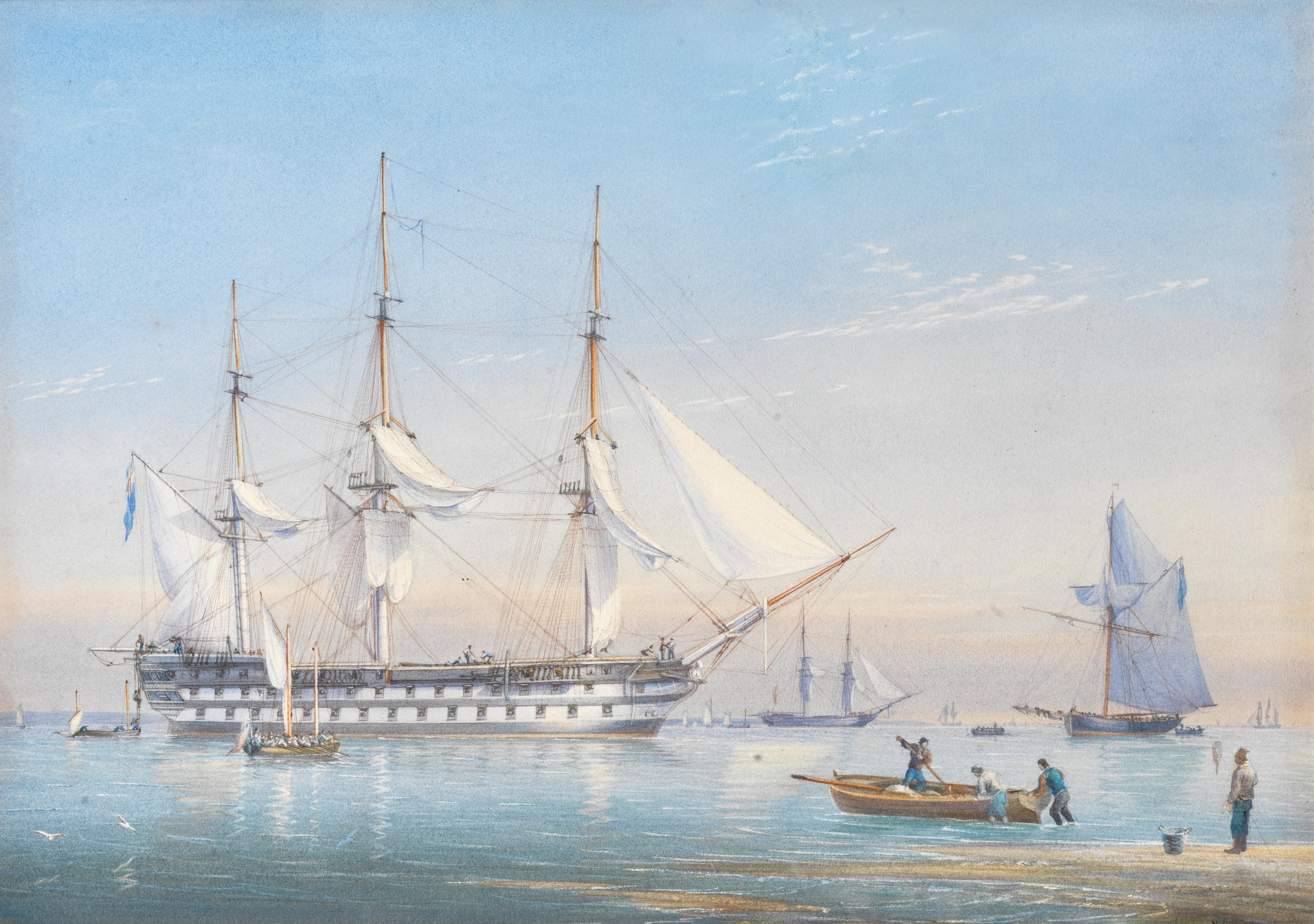
- Donegal at sea, by John Cantiloe Joy, 1885

History

United Kingdom
- Name: Donegal
- Namesake: Battle of Donegal, 1798
- Ordered: 27 December 1854
- Builder: HM Dockyard, Devonport
- Laid down: 27 September 1855
- Launched: 23 September 1858
- Completed: 27 August 1859
- Commissioned: 23 June 1859
- Decommissioned: 30 September 1870
- Renamed: As Vernon, 14 January 1886
- Reclassified: As training ship, 14 January 1886
- Fate: Sold for scrap, 18 May 1925

General characteristics (as built)
- Class & type: Conqueror-class ship of the line
- Tons burthen: 3,245 73/94 (bm)
- Length: 275 ft (83.8 m) (o/a)
- Beam: 55 ft 5 in (16.9 m)
- Draught: 21 ft (6.4 m)
- Depth of hold: 24 ft 5 in (7.4 m)
- Installed power: boilers; 3,103 ihp (2,314 kW; 3,146 PS)
- Propulsion: 1 shaft; trunk steam engine
- Sail plan: Full-rigged ship
- Speed: 11.8 kn (21.9 km/h; 13.6 mph)
- Complement: 930
- Armament: Lower gundeck: 36 × 8 in (203 mm) shell guns; Upper gundeck: 36 × 32 pdr guns; Forecastle & Quarterdeck: 28 × 32 pdr guns; 1 × 68 pdr gun

HMS Donegal was a 101-gun, two-deck, first-rate, screw-driven Conqueror-class ship of the line built for the Royal Navy (RN) during the 1850s. Completed in 1859, she served with the Channel and North America and West Indies Squadrons before she was paid off in 1862. Donegal was a guard ship in Liverpool from 1864 to 1869. The ship was renamed Vernon in 1886 when she became part of HMS Vernon, the RN's torpedo and mine school. The ship was sold for scrap in 1925.

== Design and description ==
The Conqueror-class ships were lengthened version of the preceding HMS St Jean d'Acre. Donegal measured 240 feet (73.2 m) on the gun deck and 204 feet 10 inches (62.4 m) on the keel. She had a beam of 55 feet 5 inches (16.9 m), a depth of hold of 24 feet 5 inches (7.4 m), a light draught of 21 feet 1 inch (6.43 m) and had a tonnage of 3,245 73/94 tons burthen. Her crew numbered 930 officers and ratings.

The ships were equipped with a two-cylinder, trunk steam engine built by John Penn and Sons that was rated at 800 nominal horsepower and drove a single propeller shaft. During Donegal's sea trials on 16 July 1859, her boilers provided enough steam for the engine to produce 3,103 indicated horsepower (2,314 kW) that was good for a speed of 11.9 knots (22.0 km/h; 13.7 mph). The ships were fitted with three masts and were ship-rigged. To reduce drag and improve performance under sail, they could hoist their propeller into the hull and retract the telescoping funnel.

The Conqueror-class ships were armed with 101 muzzle-loading, smoothbore guns that consisted of thirty-six 8 in (203 mm) shell guns on their lower gun deck and thirty-six 32-pounder (56 cwt) guns (Note: "Cwt" is the abbreviation for hundredweight, 56 cwt referring to the weight of the gun.) on their upper gun deck. Between the forecastle and quarterdeck, the Conquerors carried twenty-eight 32-pounder (45 cwt) guns. The single 68-pounder gun was positioned on the forecastle as a pivot gun so that it could serve as a bow chaser.

== Construction and career ==
Named for the British victory in the 1798 Battle of Donegal, Donegal was the second ship of her name to serve in the RN. She was ordered on 27 December 1854 and was laid down at HM Dockyard, Devonport, on 27 September 1855. The ship was launched on 23 September 1858 and commissioned by Captain William Glanville on 23 June 1859. Donegal completed on 27 August and sailed to Liverpool to recruit a crew and then joined the Channel Squadron. On 28 October, William Hall was presented with the Victoria Cross by Rear-Admiral Charles Talbot while Donegal was anchored at Queenstown Harbour (modern Cobh). In November she was transferred to the North America and West Indies Station. Captain Henry Broadhead relieved Glanville on 3 November and was relieved in his turn by Captain Sherard Osborn on 18 May 1861. Donegal returned home the following year and was paid off on 10 June 1862 at Devonport Dockyard.

The ship was recommissioned by Captain James Paynter on 1 September 1864; by this time her armament had been reduced to 81 guns. Assigned to Liverpool as a guard ship, Paynter took the last surrender of the American Civil War on 6 November 1865 when the Confederate cruiser CSS Shenandoah surrendered after travelling 9,000 miles (14,500 km) from the Pacific Ocean to avoid American ships and possibly being hanged as pirates if captured. Shenandoah had originally been there when news reached her of the end of the Civil War, necessitating such a long voyage. Captain Edwin Turnour relieved Paynter on 1 May 1867 and the ship was relieved of her guard ship duties in May 1869.

On her next assignment she carried Vice-Admiral Sir Henry Kellett and a replacement crew to relieve HMS Ocean, then on the China Station under Vice-Admiral Henry Keppel. Captain William Hewett commissioned the ship on 25 November and was seconded by Commander John Fisher. In 1870 she became a tender to HMS Duke of Wellington, which was then a receiving ship in Portsmouth. Donegal was paid off on 30 September 1870.

On 14 January 1886, Donegal was hulked and became part of the Torpedo School at Portsmouth; she was renamed Vernon. On 23 April 1895 she was moved to Portchester Creek, along with the rest of the hulks making up the school. She remained in this role until the torpedo school moved onshore in 1923, and Donegal was sold for scrap on 18 May 1925 to Harry Pounds, shipbreakers of Portsmouth. Some of the timbers and panelling were used to rebuild the Prince of Wales public house (reopened as The Old Ship in 2007) in Brighouse in 1926.

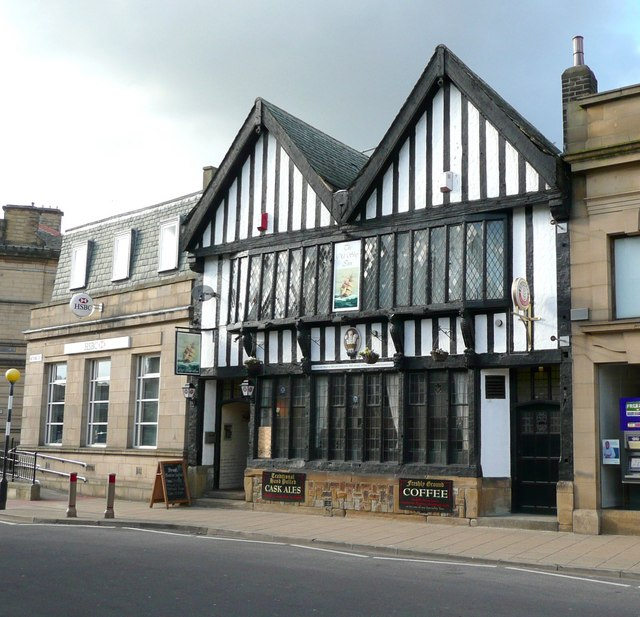
The Old Ship public house in Brighouse which was built from the timbers of the decommissioned Donegal in 1926.

== Bibliography ==
- Baldwin, John & Powers, Ron (2007). Last Flag Down: The Epic Journey of the Last Confederate Warship. Crown Publishers.
- Colledge, J. J.; Warlow, Ben & Bush, Steve (2020). Ships of the Royal Navy: The Complete Record of all Fighting Ships of the Royal Navy from the 15th Century to the Present (5th revised and updated ed.). Seaforth Publishing. ISBN 978-1-5267-9327-0.
- Lambert, Andrew D. (1984). Battleships in Transition: The Creation of the Steam Battlefleet 1815-1860. Conway Maritime Press. ISBN 0-85177-315-X.
- Manning, T. D. & Walker, C. F. (1959). British Warship Names. Putnam. OCLC 838607.
- Warlow, B. (2000) [1992]. Shore Establishments of the Royal Navy (Revised and enlarged ed.). Maritime Books. ISBN 0-907771-73-4.
- Winfield, Rif (2014). British Warships in the Age of Sail, 1817–1863: Design, Construction, Careers and Fates. Seaforth Publishing. ISBN 978-1-84832-169-4.
