= Conqueror-class ship of the line =

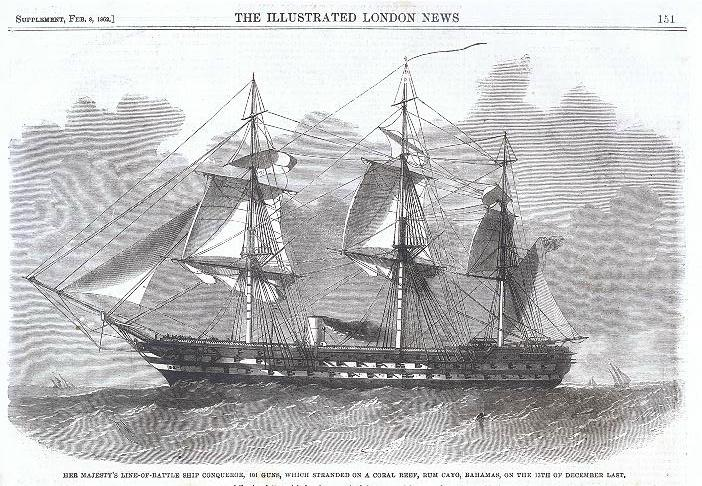
- An image of Conqueror from the Illustrated London News, 1861

Class overview
- Name: Conqueror
- Operators: Royal Navy
- Preceded by: HMS St Jean d'Acre
- Succeeded by: Duncan class
- Built: 1853–1859
- In service: 1856-1925
- Completed: 2
- Lost: 1
- Scrapped: 1

General characteristics
- Type: Second-rate Ship of the line
- Tons burthen: 3,245 bm
- Length: 275 ft (83.8 m) (o/a)
- Beam: 55 ft 5 in (16.9 m)
- Draught: 21 ft (6.4 m)
- Depth of hold: 24 ft 5 in (7.4 m)
- Installed power: 3,103 ihp (2,314 kW; 3,146 PS)
- Propulsion: Screw propeller
- Sail plan: Full-rigged ship
- Speed: 11.8 kn (21.9 km/h; 13.6 mph)
- Complement: 930
- Armament: Lower gundeck: 36 × 8 in (203 mm) shell guns; Upper gundeck: 36 × 32 pdr guns; Forecastle & Quarterdeck: 28 × 32 pdr guns; 1 × 68 pdr gun

The Conqueror-class ships of the line consisted of a pair of 101-gun, second-rate screw-propelled ships designed by the Surveyor's Department for the Royal Navy during the 1850s.

== Design ==
The Conqueror class ships were designed in 1852 as two-decker 101-gun second rates in a period when many under-construction sailing ships of the line were being redesigned to use screw propulsion in addition to sail. Two ships were subsequently completed, HMS Conqueror and HMS Donegal.

== Careers ==
Both ships saw service in the Channel Squadron. Both were used to transport troops to Mexico in support of the French intervention there in 1861. HMS Conqueror was wrecked on Rum Cay whilst carrying this out, but without losses, and most of her machinery, guns and stores were subsequently salvaged. The advent of armoured ironclads, such as HMS Warrior in the 1860s made the traditional ships of the line largely obsolete. HMS Donegal continued in service as a guard ship, in which role she took the last surrender of the American Civil War. She was hulked in 1886, and became part of the torpedo training school HMS Vernon. She served until the establishment moved on shore in 1923, and was broken up in 1925.

== Ships ==
- HMS Conqueror

Builder: Devonport Dockyard
Ordered: 16 November 1852
Laid down: 25 July 1853
Launched: 2 May 1855
Completed: 9 April 1856
Fate: Wrecked at Rum Cay, 13 December 1861

- HMS Donegal

Builder: Devonport Dockyard
Ordered: 27 December 1854
Laid down: 27 September 1855
Launched: 23 September 1858
Completed: 27 August 1859
Fate: Renamed HMS Vernon, 14 January 1886. Sold for breaking up, 18 May 1925
