= HMS Hood (1859) =

Ship of the line of the Royal Navy

History

United Kingdom
- Name: Hood
- Ordered: 30 March 1848
- Builder: Chatham Dockyard
- Laid down: 13 August 1849
- Launched: 6 November 1859
- Completed: 15 June 1855
- Fate: Scrapped, 1888

General characteristics (as built)
- Class & type: 91-gun, second-rate Orion-class ship of the line
- Tons burthen: 3,350bm
- Length: 238 ft (72.5 m) (gun deck)
- Beam: 55 ft 11 in (17 m)
- Draught: 26 ft 10 in (8.2 m) (deep load)
- Depth of hold: 24 ft (7.3 m)
- Installed power: 2,385 ihp (1,778 kW)
- Propulsion: 1 screw; 1 trunk steam engine
- Sail plan: Full-rigged ship
- Speed: 11.7 knots (21.7 km/h; 13.5 mph)
- Complement: 860
- Armament: 91 muzzle-loading, smoothbore guns: Lower deck: 34 × 8 in (203 mm) shell guns; Upper deck: 34 × 32 pdr guns; Quarter deck & Forecastle: 22 × 32 pdrs + 1 × 68 pdr

HMS Hood was a 91-gun, second rate Orion-class ship of the line built for the Royal Navy (RN) during the 1850s, the last sailing ships of the line ordered for the RN. She was converted to screw propulsion while still under construction. The ship was completed in 1859, but was never fitted for sea duty or commissioned. Hood was in ordinary from 1860 to 1870. The ship served as a barracks ship from 1872 until 1888 when she was sold for scrap.

== Background and description ==
The Orion-class ships were originally ordered as 80-gun, Vanguard-class ships of the line, but the design of their hull was significantly revised by the Assistant Surveyors of the Navy, John Edye and Isaac Watts. The ships were intended to measure 198 feet (60.4 m) at the gun deck and 161 feet 1 inch (49.1 m) at the keel. They would have had a beam of 55 feet 9 inches (17.0 m), a depth of hold of 23 feet 4 inches (7.1 m) and had a tonnage of 2,600 1/94 tons burthen. Their crew would have numbered 720 officers and ratings. The ships had the usual three-masted full-ship rig. Their muzzle-loading, smoothbore armament was intended to consist of twenty 32-pounder (56 cwt) guns (Note: "Cwt" is the abbreviation for hundredweight, 56 cwt referring to the weight of the gun.) and eight 8 in (203 mm) (65 cwt) shell guns on the lower gun deck. The upper gun deck was intended to have had twenty-four 50 cwt, 32-pounder and four 8-inch shell guns. Between their forecastle and quarterdeck, the ships would have carried twenty-four 32-pounder (42 cwt) guns.

=== Screw conversion ===
Based on the experiences gained during the Crimean War, Captain Baldwin Wake Walker, Surveyor of the Navy, favored converting first- and second-rate ships as they could accommodate the engines and their required coal better than smaller ships. The arms race between France and Britain in screw-propelled ships of the line had resumed after the Crimean War ended in 1856 and Walker ordered Hood to be converted in April of that year whilst she was still under construction. She generally followed her sister in detail, but her stern was modified to improve the water flow to the screw and she was slightly larger. She had to be lengthened by 40 feet (12.2 m) to incorporate a steam engine and a propeller. The ship measured 238 feet (72.5 m) on the gun deck and 206 feet (62.8 m) on the keel. She had a beam of 55 feet 11 inches (17 m), a depth of hold of 24 feet (7.3 m), a deep draught of 26 feet 10 inches (8.2 m) and had a tonnage of 3,350 tons burthen. The ship was fitted with a two-cylinder trunk steam engine built by John Penn and Sons that was rated at 600 nominal horsepower and drove a single propeller shaft. To reduce drag and improve performance under sail, the ship could hoist her propeller into the hull and retract the telescoping funnel. Her boilers provided enough steam for the engine to produce 2,385 indicated horsepower (1,778 kW) that was good for a speed of 11.7 knots (21.7 km/h; 13.5 mph) during her sea trials on the Thames River on 24 November 1859, although her masts and stores were not yet fitted. Her crew numbered 860 officers and ratings.

The ship's armament consisted of thirty-four 8-inch shell guns on her lower gun deck and thirty-four 56 cwt, 32-pounder guns on her upper gun deck. Between her forecastle and quarterdeck, she carried twenty-two 32-pounder, 45 cwt guns and a single 68-pounder gun on a pivot mount.

== Construction and career ==
HMS Hood brooch from Duke of Cambridge's Own (Middlesex Regiment) in Auckland Museum

Hood was originally ordered with the name Edgar on 30 March 1848 as an 80-gun second rate. The ship received her final name on 29 June and was the first ship of her name to serve in the RN. She was laid down to a modified design at Chatham Dockyard on 13 August 1849; together with Orion, they were the last sailing ships of the line to be laid down for the RN. With the advent of steam propulsion in warship design, she was reordered on 9 April 1856. Her stern had to be partially launched to allow the hull to be lengthened and the official launching occurred on 4 May 1859. Hood was never outfitted for sea and was completed for ordinary by 15 June at Sheerness Dockyard. The ship remained at Sheerness until 1870, by which time she had been reduced to 54 guns. Hood was loaned to the War Department to serve as a barracks ship at Woolwich in 1872. The ship was sold for scrap in 1888.

== Bibliography ==
- Colledge, J. J.; Warlow, Ben & Bush, Steve (2020). Ships of the Royal Navy: The Complete Record of all Fighting Ships of the Royal Navy from the 15th Century to the Present (5th revised and updated ed.). Seaforth Publishing. ISBN 978-1-5267-9327-0.
- Lambert, Andrew D. (1984). Battleships in Transition: The Creation of the Steam Battlefleet 1815-1860. Conway Maritime Press. ISBN 0-85177-315-X.
- Manning, T. D. & Walker, C. F. (1959). British Warship Names. Putnam. OCLC 838607.
- Warlow, B. (2000) [1992]. Shore Establishments of the Royal Navy (Revised and enlarged ed.). Maritime Books. ISBN 0-907771-73-4.
- Winfield, Rif (2014). British Warships in the Age of Sail 1817–1863: Design, Construction, Careers and Fates. Seaforth Publishing. ISBN 978-1-84832-169-4.
