= HMS Penelope (1829) =

Frigate of the Royal Navy

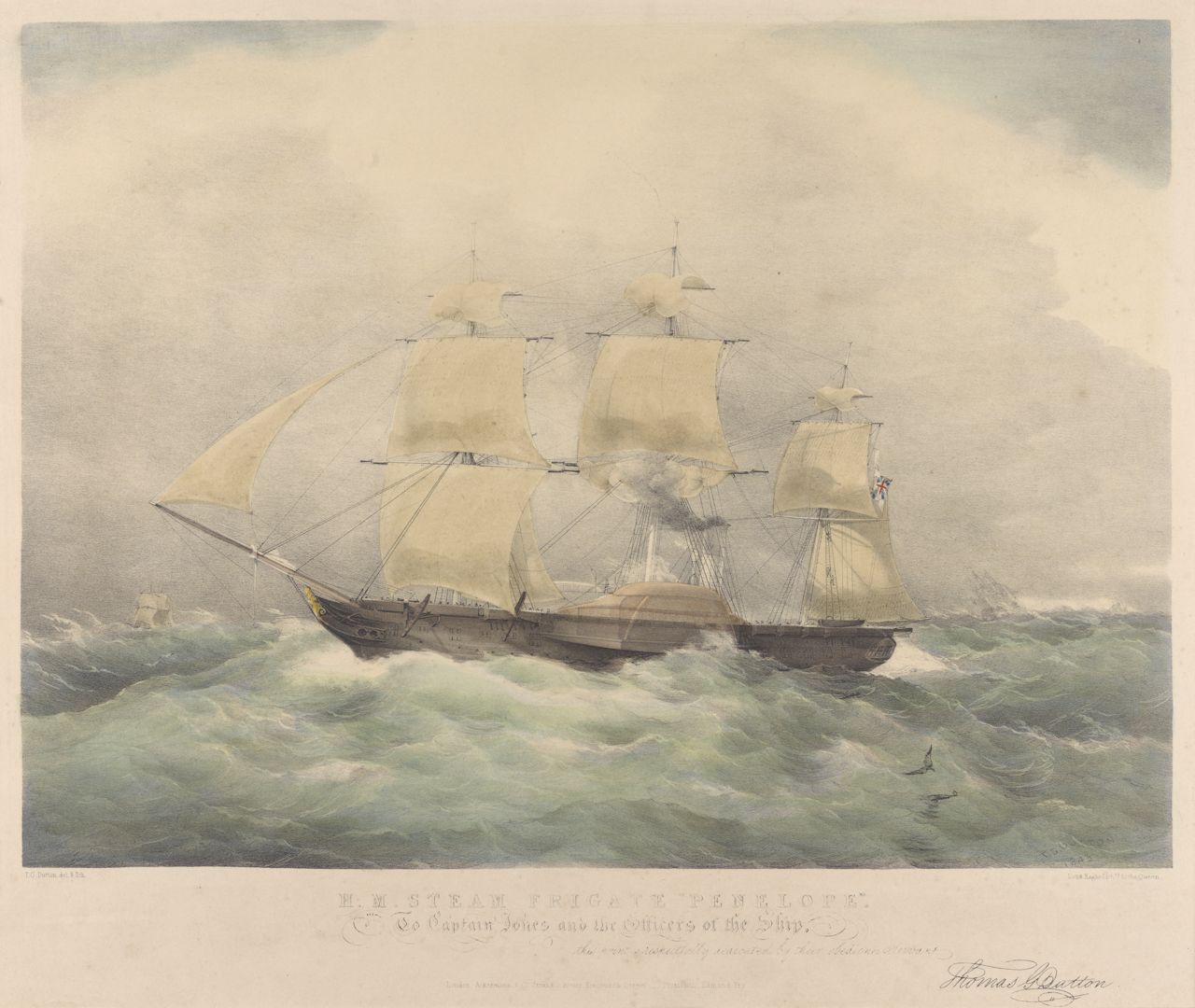
- Steam frigate Penelope

History

United Kingdom
- Name: Penelope
- Namesake: Penelope
- Builder: Admiralty, Chatham
- Launched: 13 October 1829

General characteristics (as sailing frigate)
- Class & type: Leda-class frigate
- Displacement: 1,469 tons
- Tons burthen: 1,09055/94 bm
- Length: 151 ft 10 in (46.3 m) (pp)
- Beam: 40 ft 2 in (12.2 m) (extreme)
- Depth of hold: 26 ft 4 in (8.03 m)
- Sail plan: Full-rigged ship
- Armament: 46 guns: Upper gundeck: 28 × 18 pdr cannon; Quarterdeck: 14 × 32 pdr carronades; Forecastle: 2 × 9 pdr cannon and 2 × 32 pdr carronades

General characteristics (as paddle frigate)
- Displacement: 2,766 long tons
- Tons burthen: 1,630 (bm)
- Length: 215 ft 2 in (65.6 m) (pp); 215 ft (65.5 m) (main deck)
- Beam: 40 ft 9 in (12.4 m)
- Draft: 20 ft 4 in (6.2 m) (max.)
- Depth of hold: 26 ft 8 in (8.13 m)
- Propulsion: Two direct-acting engines; 650 nhp
- Speed: 10.5–11 knots (19.4–20.4 km/h; 12.1–12.7 mph)
- Complement: 300
- Armament: Main gundeck: 8 × 68 pdr 65 cwt; 2 × 68 pdr 36 cwt; Quarterdeck and forecastle: 2 × 42 pdr 84 cwt guns on pivots; 10 × 42 pdr 23 cwt carronade; 2 × 24 pdr howitzer; 2 × 18 pdr howitzer

HMS Penelope was first laid down as one of the many sail frigates that England built to a French model. She was then changed to a unique steam paddle frigate. For some time she was a very famous ship, having a claim to being the first steam frigate. In the end the promise that she would be the first of a line of true steam paddle frigates proved false.

== Context ==
In the first decades of the nineteenth century the United Kingdom built many comparatively light sail frigates. Penelope was one of the last of these. When it became clear that they could not stand up to more modern heavy frigates, some of them, including Penelope, were not finished. Contemporary steam vessels propelled by paddle wheels could match the speed of heavy frigates in most circumstances, but they lacked a comparable armament. Therefore, the major navies spent much money attempting to create a steam frigate. A steam frigate would be a steam vessel with an armament comparable to a heavy frigate. Penelope was one of the (failed) attempts to create such a ship with paddle wheel propulsion.

== Characteristics ==
=== Design ===
Penelope was designed and built as one of the Leda-class frigates. At the time they were often called Hébé-class frigates because they were based on the French frigate Hébé. In 1815 it was decided that the Royal Navy should have 80 frigates, and that they should be of the class and on the lines on Hébé. In 1815 six were ordered to "a modified design that incorporated Sir Robert Seppings's circular stern and "small-timber" form of construction," hence the name "improved Leda class." In 1817 another 22 of these were ordered, but two of these were cancelled and three later re-ordered to a different design. Those that were launched were fitted for ordinary and laid up.

By 1831 there were 54 of these ships built and building. In 1832 Sir Thomas Hardy pointed out that the Hébés could not match foreign frigates that had increased their armament. Construction of the rest of the class including Penelope was then stopped. In 1838 the assistant-surveyor of the navy, John Edye, submitted a plan to convert these frigates into war-steamers. After much discussion, Penelope was chosen as a ship upon which to conduct the experiment.

The design of the converted Penelope was simple in the basics. The existing sail frigate had to be cut in two, and a 63-foot (19 m) mid-section was to be inserted to house the steam engine. However, the proposal for her reconstruction was considerably changed, and so the weight of everything loaded on board was increased by 143.5 tons. The total cost of the conversion came to £59,489, of which £34,042 for the machinery.

=== Machinery ===
During her rebuild Penelope received the most powerful machinery yet seen. There were two direct acting engines of 650 nominal horsepower combined. They were supplied by Messrs. Seaward & Co. of Limehouse. The paddle wheels had a diameter of 30 feet (9.1 m). The weight of this machinery was 530 tons. The fuel of 500 tons of coal added another 500 tons of weight. It meant that of the total displacement of 2,766 tons, the hull (1,294 t), machinery and coal took 2,324 tons.

=== Sails ===
Penelope retained full sail plan as a steam frigate. Nevertheless, the total weight of masts, rigging and sails was 85 tons as a sailing frigate, and only 25 tons as a steam frigate. She carried "nearly as much sail as when she was a sailing frigate," so less than she would have as a sail-only frigate. Penelope had an apparatus to disconnect her engines, so she was not hindered too much by the paddle-wheels when sailing.

=== Armament ===
As built Penelope was intended to have the same armament as the rest of the Leda class. That is a traditional armament of 18-pounder (8.2 kg) guns on the main deck, and 32-pounder (15 kg) carronades on the quarterdeck and forecastle. By the time of her conversion to a steam frigate guns had generally increased in calibre and weight. Nevertheless, despite an 88% increase in size, Penelope as a steam frigate carried a smaller total weight of guns, powder and shot than as a far smaller sailing frigate (132 tons versus 144 tons).

=== Criticism ===
Penelope acquired a lot of praise and a lot of criticism. In early 1844 Charles Napier ranted about Penelope, stating that "sailors called her the Porpoise, for she was always under water, and only came up once every hour to breathe." There was even harsher criticism of the original Penelope and some of her sisters in 1851. The suggestion was that she was already a failure as a sailing frigate. and therefore also failed as a steam frigate. Assistant-surveyor Edye later suggested more conversions of the class to steam frigates. In a memo dated 12 June 1845 he suggested using an engine of only 500 hp with 400 tons of coal. It would put a new frigate 14 inches (360 mm) higher in the water, and raise the ports to 6 feet (1.8 m). It might have solved the shortcomings of Penelope, but by then the navy was already working on converting HMS Amphion to screw propulsion. "The Admiralty decided that converting frigates to screw propulsion was more effective and probably easier."

== Construction and commissioning ==
Penelope was first launched on 13 October 1829. She then lay in ordinary till the plan to convert her to a steam frigate came up. The orders to do so were given on 26 March 1842, and were executed in a dry dock at Chatham Dockyard. She was docked on 11 June 1842. After the alterations had been made she was undocked on 1 April 1843. She was then towed up the River Thames to the wharf of Messrs. Seaward and Co. The machines had been ordered on 27 April 1842, and were ready to be placed on board on 1 March 1843. The installation of the engines was started in the second week of April and finished on 21 June 1843.

Penelope was commissioned on 27 June 1843 under Captain William Jones.

== Service ==
=== Visit to Antwerp ===
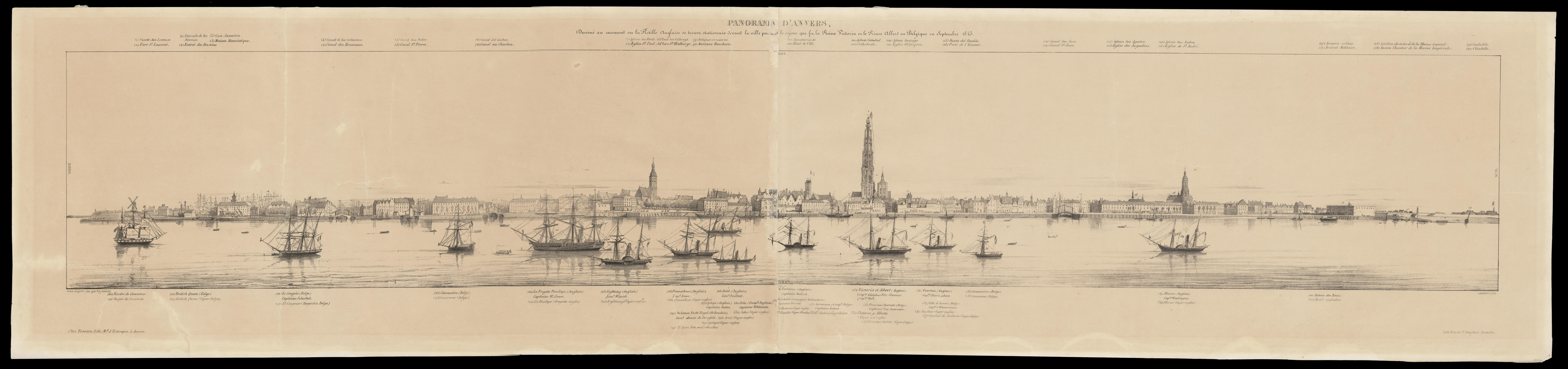
The royal squadron in Antwerp in 1843. Note the relative size of Penelope

In September 1843 Penelope joined a royal squadron near Walmer Castle in Kent. It had the royal yacht HMY Victoria and Albert (1843), with Queen Victoria and Prince Albert on board and several other steam vessels including HMS Cyclops. The royal yacht brought the queen to Ostend on 13 September. The squadron continued and arrived in Vlissingen on 14 September, and then in Antwerp on the 15th. After visiting Bruges, Ghent and Brussels, Victoria visited Antwerp, where she embarked on her yacht and left on 20 September. While Penelope was in Antwerp she was visited by the Dutch Lieutenant Willem Huyssen van Kattendijke, an ADC to the director of the Dutch navy. He spoke to several officers of Penelope, and wrote an article about her. After first citing an article in the Annales Maritimes, he noted that the depth of Penelope was 21.5 feet (6.6 m) before Antwerp, that she made 9 knots (17 km/h; 10 mph) in good circumstances, but only 7–8 knots (13–15 km/h; 8.1–9.2 mph) in bad weather. Also that the weight of the machinery and coal, together 1,035 tons, was not in line with the displacement allowed by the added mid-section. He also claimed that her officers did not agree with the idea that she could transport a 1,000 soldiers to the Cape. Van Kattendijke concluded that it was clear that the experiment had not been as successful as had been hoped, but applauded the daring of the designers.

=== To Cork ===
On 22 September 1843 Penelope arrived in Portsmouth. Penelope remained at Spithead until 28 September. On 29 September she arrived in Plymouth and proceeded to Cork the next day. The idea was to join Admiral Charles Rowley who commanded the ships of the line HMS St Vincent, HMS Caledonia and HMS Camperdown. From 6–11 October Penelope was with the squadron. Rowley ordered her to execute some manoeuvres and observed that she did quite well under steam, except that in a harsh wind she did not appear to get ahead. Under canvas without steam, she certainly was leewardly and did not sail well. But, altogether Rowley reported favourably about Penelope's qualities. After arriving in Cork in mid-October Captain Jones reported very favourably about the ship, and stressed that she was much better than the other war steamers.

=== Policing against slavers ===
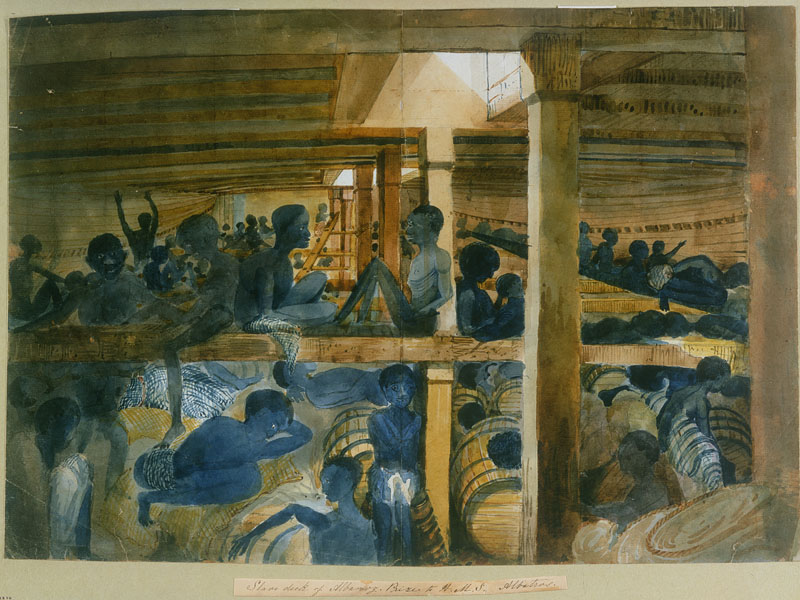
Francis Meynell, a lieutenant on Penelope recorded conditions on the transatlantic slave ship Albanoz in 1846

Penelope played a significant role as flagship of the newly promoted Commodore Jones when he commanded a British squadron tasked with enforcing the ban on the Atlantic slave trade. On 3 April 1844 she captured the Spanish schooner Maria Luisa. On 20 October 1844 Penelope captured the brig Virgina or Allerto. On 26 September 1845 she captured the steamer Cacique, and on 30 September 1845, Legeira. Much of the correspondence from aboard Penelope was published shortly after.

Jones contracted a fatal disease during his time off the coast of Africa, and died at Haslar Hospital, Gosport, in May 1846.
