= Yeni-Kale =

- Yenikale
- Crimea
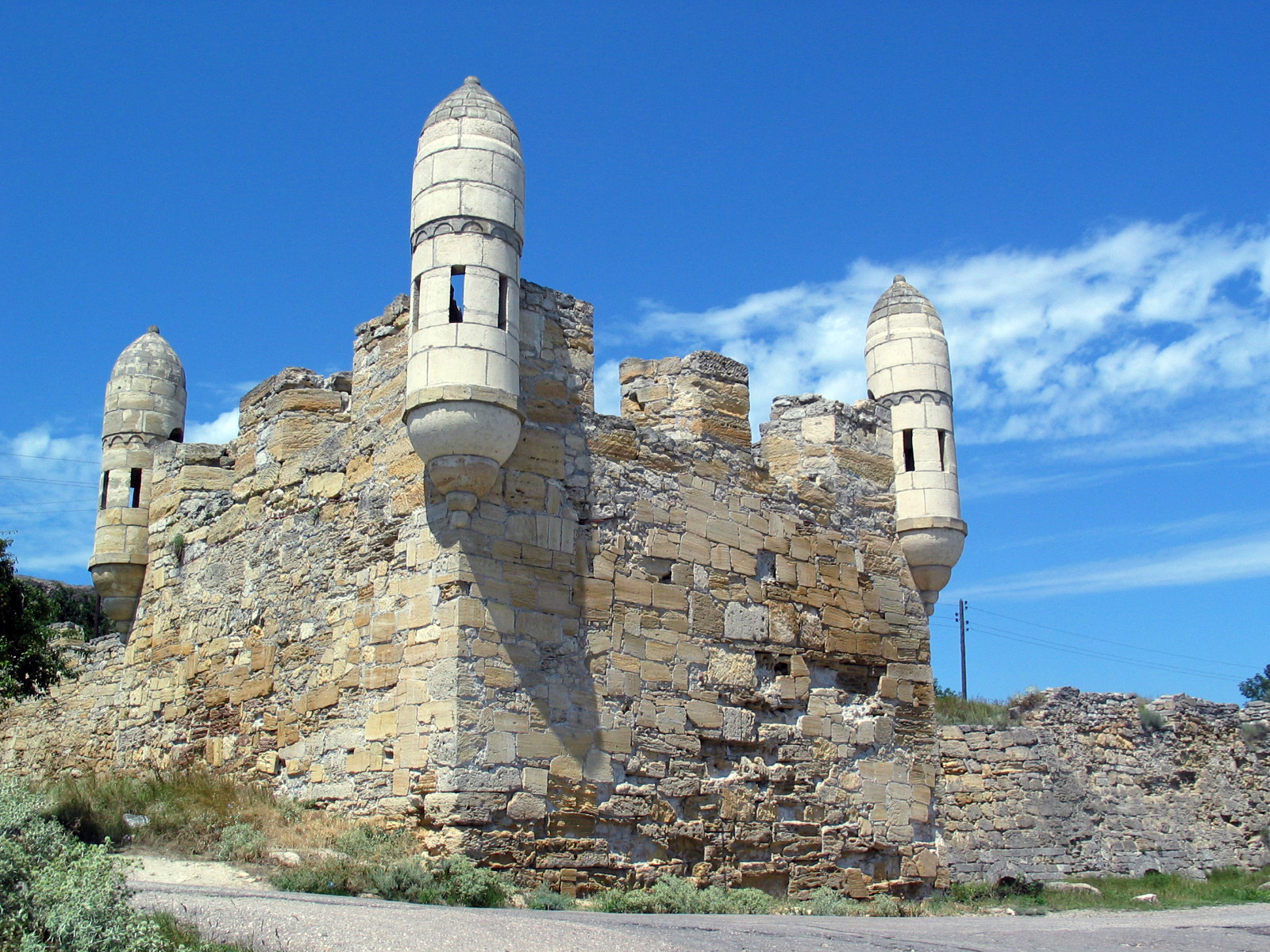
- Yeni-Kale's tower

Site information
- Open to the public: yes
- Condition: ruins

Location
- Location on Europe map
- Location within Crimea
- Coordinates: 45°20′57″N 36°36′17″E

Site history
- Built: 1706
- Built by: Goloppo
- Materials: Stone

Immovable Monument of National Significance of Ukraine
- Official name: Фортеця Ені-Кале (Yeni-Kale fortress)
- Type: Architecture
- Reference no.: 010051

Yeni-Kale (Ukrainian: Єні-Кале; Russian: Еникале; Turkish: Yenikale; Crimean Tatar: Yeñi Qale, also spelled as Yenikale and Eni-Kale and Yeni-Kaleh or Yéni-Kaleb) is a fortress located on the shore of Kerch Strait in the city of Kerch.

== History ==
In the ancient period in this area was the ancient Greek town of Myrmekion and many ancient remains have been found.

Yeni-Kale was built by Ottoman Turks in 1699–1706 on the Kerch Peninsula that belonged to the Crimean Khanate. The name Yenikale means New Castle in Turkish (yeni - new, kale - castle). The fortress was built under the guidance of Goloppo, who was an Italian convert to Islam. Several French engineers also took part in the construction.

Yeni-Kale was armed with powerful cannons and took an important strategical place on the coast of Kerch Strait. The fortress occupied area of 25,000 m^{2} and had two powder-magazines, arsenal, water reservoir, living houses, bath-house and mosque. About 800 Turkish and 300 Crimean Tatar soldiers were garrisoned in Yeni-Kale. The weak spot of the fortress was a lack of drinking water in the area, so an underground water-pipe was made to bring water from a source located several kilometres away from the fortress. Yeni-Kale also served as a residence of the pasha.

During the Russo-Turkish War of 1768–1774 the Russian Army invaded Crimea in the summer of 1771. Though reinforcements from the Ottoman Empire had arrived beforehand, the Turks decided to abandon Yeni-Kale. Russian units under command of general Nikolay Borzov entered the fortress on 21 June 1771. Abaza Muhammad Pasha who was a commandant of Yeni-Kale fled to Sinop and the sultan sentenced him to death for the number of military failures.

After the Treaty of Küçük Kaynarca in 1774, Kerch and the fortress of Yeni-Kale were ceded to Russia. The fortress became a part of the Kerch-Yenikale city municipality of the Taurida Governorate.

In the 19th century the fortress was used by Russians as a military hospital. Since the 1880s Yeni-Kale was completely deserted.

Today ruins of Yeni-Kale are often visited by tourists. The neighboring district of Kerch also is named Yeni-Kale.

== Gallery ==
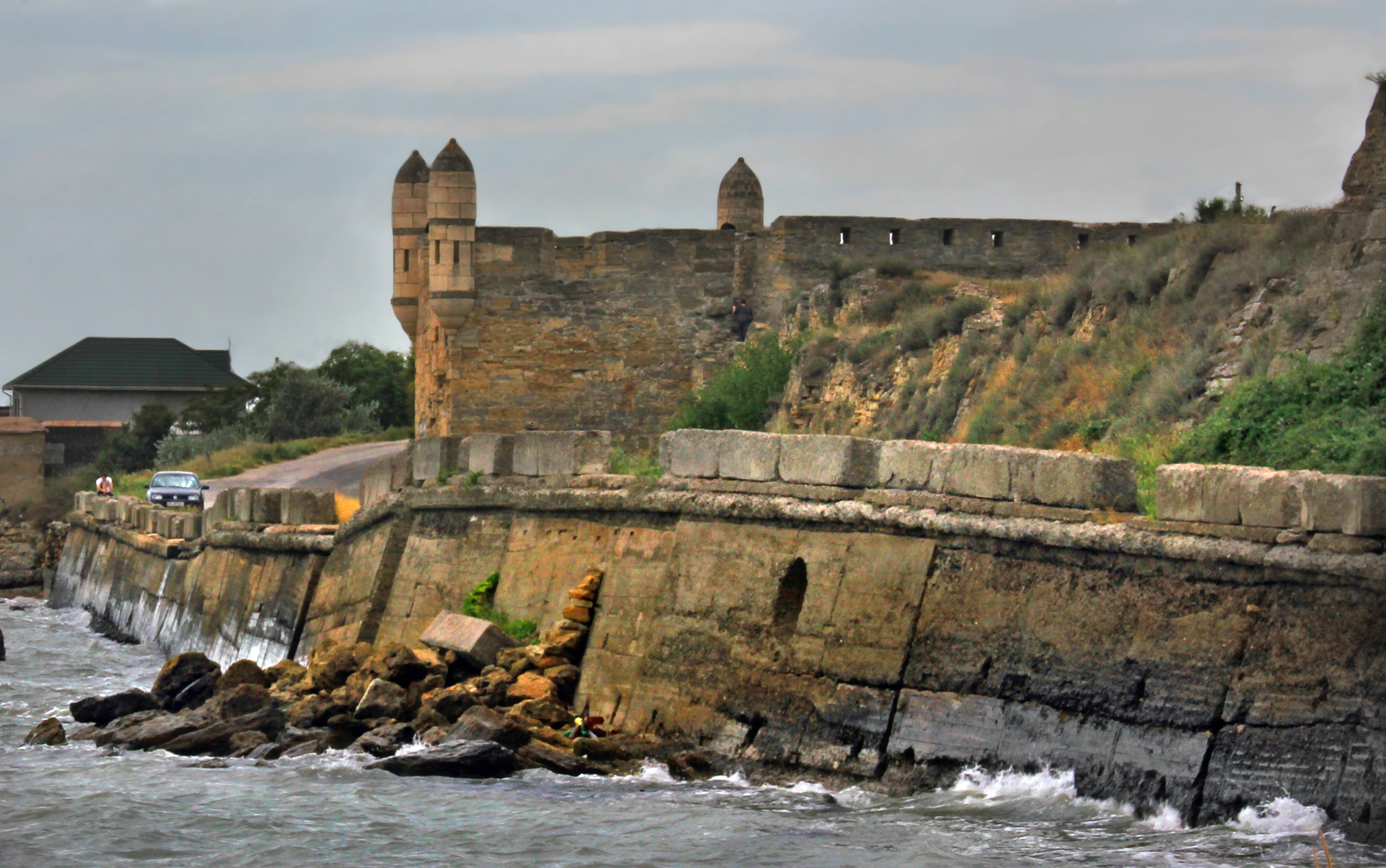
Yenikale fortress in Kerch.Crimea, Ukraine

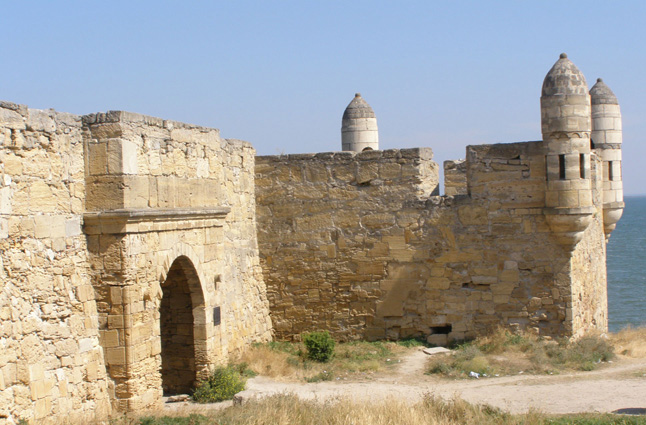
Southern gate of Yeni-Kale

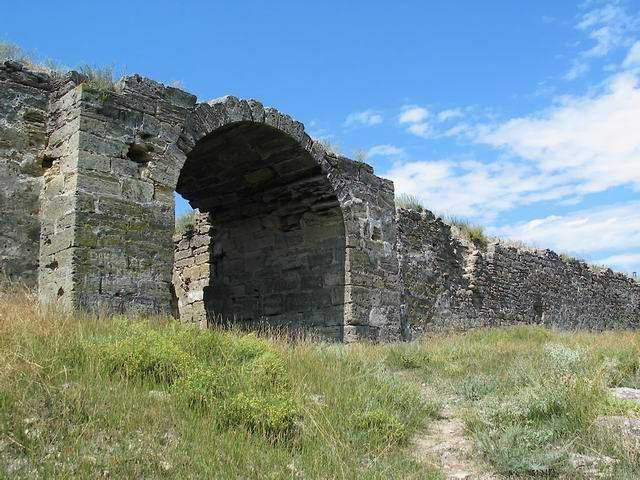
Yeni-Kale's northern wall

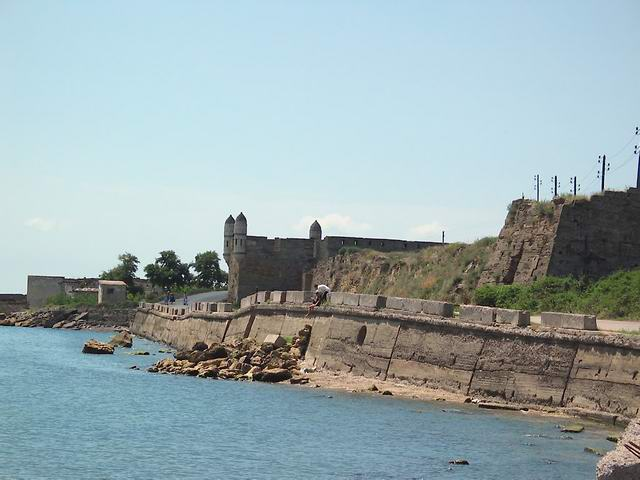
Yeni-Kale, coast side

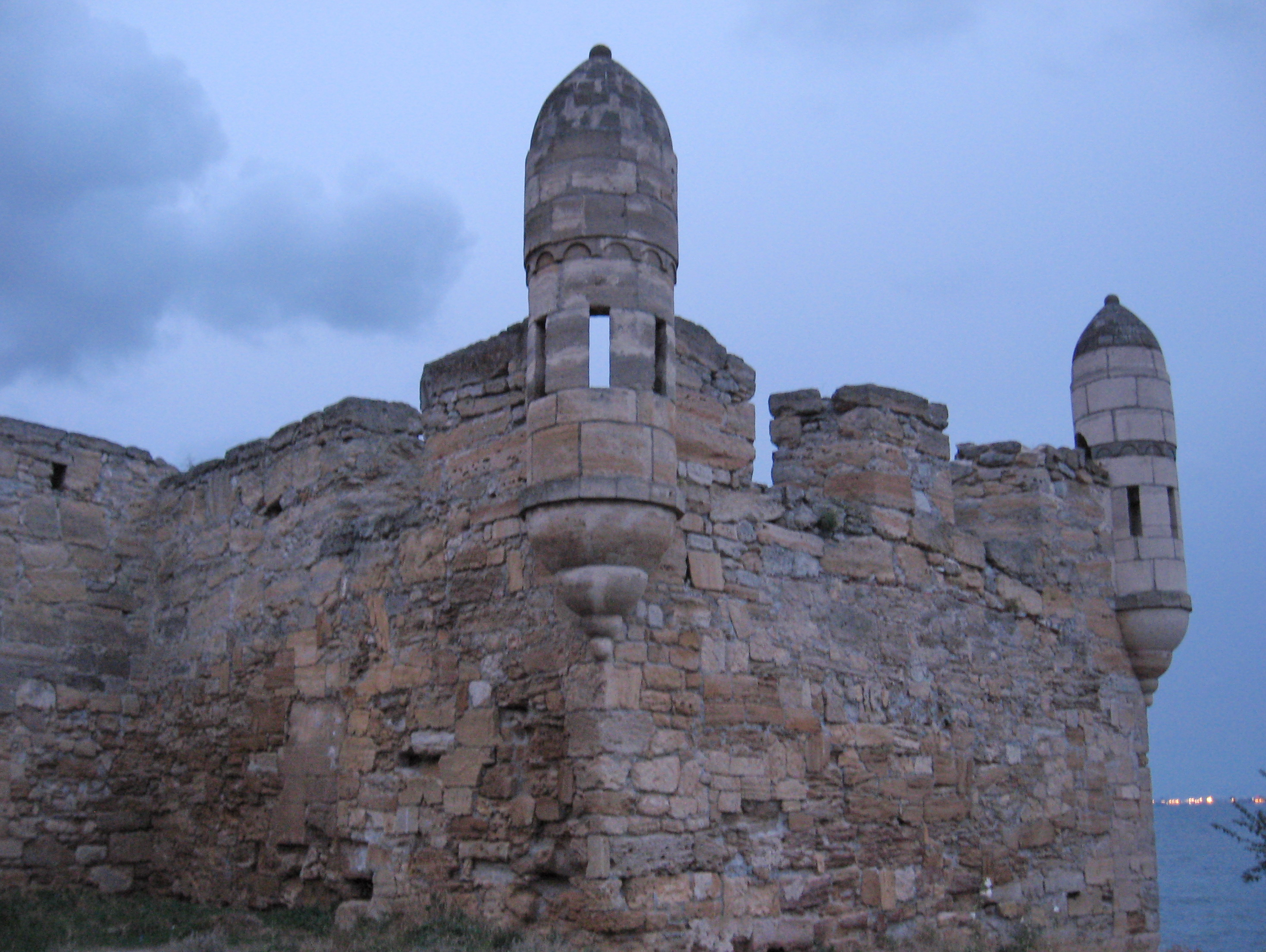
Turkish fortress

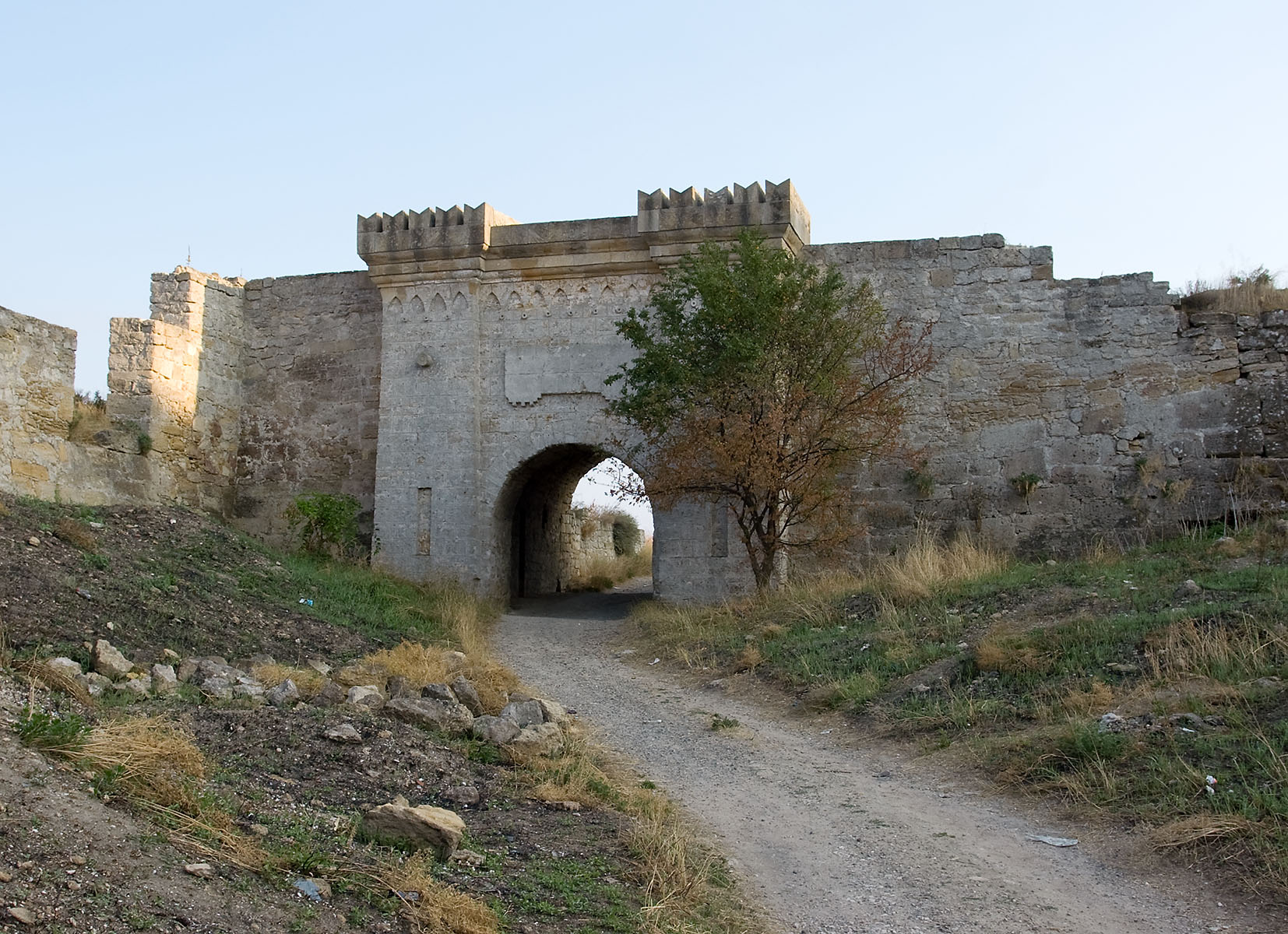
Eastern Gate
