= Albion-class ship of the line =

Two classes of ships of the line have been named the Albion class, both serving in the British Royal Navy:

- Albion-class ship of the line (1763), a class of five 74-gun third-rates
- Albion-class ship of the line (1842), a class of three 90-gun second-rates
