= Naval arms race =

A naval arms race is a situation in which two or more countries continuously construct warships that are consistently more powerful than warships built by the other country built in the previous years. The term "arms race" is first known from the late 1850s and was used by journalists to describe the competition between the navies of Britain and France, at a time when naval technology was rapidly developing such as with the introduction of ironclad warships. A naval arms race is particularly notable as naval vessels of the modern era take a long time to construct and are costly. There is little agreement among commentators on whether a naval arms race increases the risk of war between the nations involved. One argument is that it increases the risk of war as participation in the arms race is seen an act of aggression but the other is that the arms race reduces the risk as it increases the potential of war.

Examples include:

- The Austro-Italian ironclad arms race between the Kingdom of Italy and the Austrian Empire (and later Austria-Hungary) from 1860 to 1885.
- The Argentine–Chilean naval arms race between Argentina and Chile from 1887 to 1902.
- The South American dreadnought race between Argentina, Brazil and Chile from 1907 to 1914.
- The Anglo-German naval arms race, between Imperial Germany and the United Kingdom from 1898 to 1912.
- The Cold War nuclear arms race between the United States and the Soviet Union, which involved both land and naval nuclear expansion.
