= John Edye =

John Edye FRS (7 August 1789 – 1 March 1873) was a naval architect and Assistant Surveyor of the Royal Navy in the early 19th century. He invented a new means of construction for wooden warships and produced the detail for the Surveyor William Symonds's many designs. Together he and Symonds created larger and larger wooden warships for the Royal Navy, which were able not only to defeat an enemy by weight of fire (as the Navy had long been able to do) but also to pursue them and force battle.

Edye was elected a Fellow of the Royal Society on 5 February 1835.
