= List of shipwrecks in October 1865 =

The list of shipwrecks in October 1865 includes ships sunk, foundered, grounded, or otherwise lost during October 1865.

== 1 October ==
List of shipwrecks: 1 October 1865
Ship	State	Description
Ellen Bowes	United Kingdom	The barque was driven ashore in Tees Bay. She was on a voyage from Sunderland, County Durham to China. She was refloated with assistance of the tug War Eagle (United Kingdom) and resumed her voyage.
Garawalt	United Kingdom	The ship was wrecked off Hainan, Formosa. She was on a voyage from Shanghai, China to London.

== 2 October ==
List of shipwrecks: 2 October 1865
Ship	State	Description
Forest Queen	United Kingdom	The steamship was driven ashore near Hellevoetsluis, Zeeland, Netherlands.
Nautilus	United Kingdom	The brig ran aground on the Barber Sand, in the North Sea off the coast of Suffolk. She was on a voyage from London to South Shields. She was refloated and taken in to Great Yarmouth, Norfolk in a leaky condition.
Swallow	United Kingdom	The steamship was driven ashore near Hellevoetsluis. She was refloated and resumed her voyage.
X. L.	United Kingdom	The ship ran aground off Dundee, Forfarshire. She was on a voyage from London to Dundee.

== 3 October ==
List of shipwrecks: 3 October 1865
Ship	State	Description
Panola	United States	The 89-ton sidewheel paddle steamer struck a snag and sank in either Grand Bayou or Bayou Goula in Louisiana.
Reindeer	(United Kingdom of Great Britain and Ireland) New Zealand	A bottle was found near the Waiongara River mouth in December containing a note claiming that the ketch had foundered while en route from Auckland to Wanganui within sight of Mount Egmont, written by the lone survivor of a crew of four. Neither he nor the wreckage were ever found.

== 4 October ==
List of shipwrecks: 4 October 1865
Ship	State	Description
Alberdina	Denmark	The ship was abandoned in the North Sea. Her crew were rescued by the steamship Luna (Hamburg). Alberdina was towed in to Sunderland, County Durham, United Kingdom on 9 October.
Christensen	Denmark	The barque foundered in the North Sea.
River Bear	United Kingdom	The barque was destroyed by fire in the Pacific Ocean 45 nautical miles (83 km) off Coquimbo, Chile. All on board survived. She was on a voyage from Swansea, Glamorgan to Coquimbo.
HMS Terpsichore	Royal Navy	The Arachne-class corvette was deliberately sunk by a mine in the River Medway at Gillingham, Kent.
War Eagle	(United Kingdom of Great Britain and Ireland) British North America	The ship was wrecked in the Thousand Islands, Netherlands East Indies. Her crew were rescued by William Mitchell (United Kingdom). War Eagle was on a voyage from Singapore, Straits Settlements to London.

== 5 October ==
List of shipwrecks: 5 October 1865
Ship	State	Description
Arrow	United States	The ship was wrecked on Umbrella Cay. She was on a voyage from Port Royal, South Carolina to Cuba.
Britannia	United Kingdom	The cutter was driven ashore and sank near Helmsdale, Sutherland. Her crew were rescued. She was on a voyage from Helmsdale to Burghead, Moray.
Clipper	United States	The 242-ton sidewheel paddle steamer burned 70 nautical miles (130 km) upstream of Mobile, Alabama, with the loss of eight lives.
Concord	United Kingdom	The brig was driven ashore at Dover, Kent. She was on a voyage from Cowes, Isle of Wight to South Shields, County Durham. She was refloated and resumed her voyage.
Elizabeth Ferguson	United Kingdom	The brig ran aground off Great Yarmouth, Norfolk. She was on a voyage from Kronstadt, Russia to London. She was refloated and taken in to Great Yarmouth in a leaky condition.
Johanne Rieck	Stettin	The schooner was driven ashore north of Sunderland, County Durham, United Kingdom. She was on a voyage from Stettin to Sunderland. She was refloated and towed in to Sunderland in a leaky condition.
Providence	United Kingdom	The ship struck rocks and sank at Douglas, Isle of Man. She was on a voyage from Douglas to Holyhead, Anglesey.
HMS Squirrel	Royal Navy	The Racer-class brig-sloop ran aground off Drake's Island, Devon. Subsequently refloated, repaired and returned to service.

== 6 October ==
List of shipwrecks: 6 October 1865
Ship	State	Description
Alice Maud	United Kingdom	The barque was lost whilst on a voyage from Hong Kong to Singapore Straits Settlements. Her crew were rescued.
Commander in Chief	United Kingdom	The ship was destroyed by fire at Cardiff, Glamorgan.
Preussen	Prussia	The schooner was wrecked in the White Sea off Sjuøyane, Norway. Her crew were rescued. She was on a voyage from Arkhangelsk to London, United Kingdom.

== 7 October ==
List of shipwrecks: 7 October 1865
Ship	State	Description
Alpha	United States	The 107-ton screw steamer exploded in Albemarle Sound on the coast of North Carolina.
Duncan Dunbar	United Kingdom	The clipper struck a reef at Rocas Atoll in the South Atlantic Ocean, 269 miles (433 km) northeast of Recife, Brazil, and sank. Good discipline and seamanship enabled the full complement of some 80 passengers and crew to be rescued by RMS Oneida (United Kingdom) after 10 days on a barren islet.
Joseph Holmes	United Kingdom	The ship foundered in the Atlantic Ocean off Key West, Florida with the loss of all hands. She was on a voyage from New Orleans, Louisiana to Liverpool, Lancashire.
Kororarika	(United Kingdom of Great Britain and Ireland) New Zealand	The cutter was holed in Hauraki Gulf and abandoned. The crew survived, making for Auckland in the ship's dinghy.
Matanzas	United Kingdom	The ship was driven ashore at Ballycotton, County Cork. She was on a voyage from Constanţa, Ottoman Empire to Queenstown, County Cork. She was refloated and found to be leaky.
Pilot	United Kingdom	The steamship ran aground at South Shields, County Durham. She was on a voyage from South Shields to London. She was refloated and resumed her voyage.
Richard Roper	United Kingdom	The schooner was run into by the steamship United Kingdom (United Kingdom) and sank in the Clyde at Bowling, Dunbartonshire. Her crew were rescued. She was on a voyage from the Duddon Estuary to Bowling.
Southport	United Kingdom	The barque was driven ashore at Redcar, Yorkshire. She was on a voyage from South Shields to Constantinople, Ottoman Empire. She was refloated the next day with assistance from the tug Echo (United Kingdom) and towed back to South Shields in a leaky condition.
Tigranes	United Kingdom	The ship was driven ashore on Mew Island, County Down. She was on a voyage from Thessaloniki, Greece to Belfast, County Antrim.
Unnamed	United Kingdom	The brig ran aground on the Cannon Rock, in the Belfast Lough. She was refloated but foundered with the loss of all hands.

== 8 October ==
List of shipwrecks: 8 October 1865
Ship	State	Description
Bolivar	United Kingdom	The steamship ran aground on the Lemartine Reefs, off Port-au-Prince, Haiti. She was on a voyage from Liverpool, Lancashire to Veracruz, Mexico. She was later refloated and resumed her voyage.
Enterprise	United States	The 26-ton sidewheel paddle steamer struck a snag and sank in the Mississippi River downstream of Red Wing, Minnesota.
Hope	United Kingdom	The smack was wrecked at "Curregonnen", Pembrokeshire. Her crew were rescued. She was on a voyage from Milford Haven to Newport, Pembrokeshire.
Olive Branch	United Kingdom	The schooner was driven ashore in Courtmasherry Bay. She was on a voyage from Cardiff, Glamorgan to Ballinacurra, County Cork.

== 9 October ==
List of shipwrecks: 9 October 1865
Ship	State	Description
Active	United Kingdom	The brig was driven ashore at Whitby, Yorkshire. Her crew were rescued by rocket apparatus. She was on a voyage from London to Hartlepool, County Durham to Hartlepool, County Durham.
Atlantic No. 2	United States	The 53-ton sternwheel paddle steamer struck a snag and sank in the Black Warrior River or Tombigbee River at Demopolis, Alabama.
Heinrich Sorensen	Denmark	The barque was driven ashore at Hartlepool, County Durham, United Kingdom. She was refloated and taken in to Hartlepool in a severely leaky condition.
Kathleen	United Kingdom	The brig collided with the Cockle Lightship ( Trinity House). Three of her crew got on board the lightship. The Caister Lifeboat assisted Kathleen to Hemsby, Norfolk and subsequently rescued those crew members on the lightship. Kathleen was on a voyage from Fécamp, Seine-Inférieure, France to Hartlepool, County Durham. She was subsequently towed in to Great Yarmouth, Norfolk.
Tycoon	United States	The 332-ton sidewheel paddle steamer burned on the Mississippi River at Tiptonville, Tennessee.

== 10 October ==
List of shipwrecks: 10 October 1865
Ship	State	Description
Advice	United Kingdom	The schooner was wrecked at Whitburn, County Durham with the loss of one of her crew. Survivors were rescued by the Coastguard using rocket apparatus. She was on a voyage from Riga, Russia to London.
Catherine	United Kingdom	The brig was wrecked at Seaham, County Durham. Her six crew were rescued.
Charlotte	United Kingdom	The sloop was wrecked on the Roaring Middle Sand, in The Wash. Her crew were rescued. She was on a voyage from Snettisham, Norfolk to Freiston, Lincolnshire.
Donna Paulina	United States	The ship departed from New York for a British port. No further trace, presumed foundered with the loss of all hands.
Economy	United Kingdom	The brig was driven ashore at Hartlepool, County Durham. She was refloated with the assistance of the tugs Amelia and Liberty (both United Kingdom) and towed in to Hartlepool in a severely damaged condition.
Egmont	United Kingdom	The ship ran aground on the Haisborough Sands, in the North Sea off the coast of Norfolk. She was refloated and resumed her voyage.
Favourite	United Kingdom	The schooner was abandoned off Sunderland, County Durham. Her crew were rescued by the tug Privateer (United Kingdom). Favourite was on a voyage from Seaham to Ipswich, Suffolk. She was subsequently driven ashore and wrecked at Sunderland.
Frederick VII	United Kingdom	The dandy rigged-schooner foundered off the mouth of the River Wear with the loss of all three crew. She was on a voyage from Honfleur, Calvados, France to Seaham.
Gauntlet	United Kingdom	The fishing smack was driven ashore at Sunderland, County Durham.
Laurel	United Kingdom	The brigantine was abandoned in the North Sea off Lindisfarne, Northumberland. Her five crew were rescued by the clipper Teviot (United Kingdom). Laurel was on a voyage from London to Inverness. She was subsequently driven ashore and wrecked at Goswick, Northumberland.
Medora	United Kingdom	The collier, a brig, foundered in the North Sea off the mouth of the River Tyne with the loss of all seven crew. She was on a voyage from the River Tyne to Hamburg.
Morning Star	United Kingdom	The schooner was driven ashore and damaged 1 nautical mile (1.9 km) north of Montrose, Forfarshire. Her crew survived. She was on a voyage from Stettin to Leith, Lothian. Morning Star was refloated on 2 November and towed in to Montrose, where she was beached.
Ringwood	United Kingdom	The brigantine was wrecked on the Black Middens, at the mouth of the River Tyne with the loss of three of her five crew. She was on a voyage from Seaham to Great Yarmouth, Norfolk.
Sarah Ellen	United Kingdom	The ship foundered in the North Sea off Flamborough Head, Yorkshire. Her crew were rescued. She was on a voyage from Seaham to London.
HMS Sepoy	Royal Navy	The Albacore-class gunboat was driven ashore and severely damaged at the mouth of the River Tweed.
Soumi	Russia	The full-rigged ship ran aground at the mouth of the River Tyne. She was on a voyage from Hull, Yorkshire, United Kingdom to the River Tyne.
Tarsit	United Kingdom	The steamship ran aground at Stockholm, Sweden. She was refloated on 16 October and towed in to Stockholm.
Zero	United States	The brig was abandoned off Le Have, Nova Scotia, British North America. Her captain had been murdered by some of the crew and an attempt had been made to scuttle her. She was on a voyage from Cow Bay, Nova Scotia to Boston, Massachusetts. She was subsequently taken in to Le Have.
Unnamed	United Kingdom	The schooner was driven ashore and wrecked north of Berwick upon Tweed, Northumberland. Her crew were rescued.

== 11 October ==
List of shipwrecks: 11 October 1865
Ship	State	Description
Clemens August	Italy	The brig was beached near Lyme Regis, Dorset, United Kingdom. Her crew were rescued. She was on a voyage from Livorno to Genoa and Dordrecht, South Holland, Netherlands.
Premier	United Kingdom	The schooner was driven ashore at Cape Spartel, Morocco.
Richmond	United Kingdom	The ship was driven ashore near Arthurstown, County Wexford. She was on a voyage from Waterford to Lymington, Hampshire.
Saida	United Kingdom	The steamship was driven ashore 6 nautical miles (11 km) from Alexandria, Egypt Eyalet. She was on a voyage from Liverpool, Lancashire to Alexandria.
Tower	United Kingdom	The schooner collided with another vessel in the Irish Sea with the loss of three of her four crew. She was fallen in with the next day by May Queen (United Kingdom), which put two men aboard and she was taken in to Ilfracombe, Devon.

== 12 October ==
List of shipwrecks: 12 October 1865
Ship	State	Description
Dorothea	Prussia	The barque was abandoned in the North Sea. She was on a voyage from Riga, Russia to London, United Kingdom. She was taken in to Lindisfarne, Northumberland, United Kingdom in a derelict condition.
Earl Grey	United Kingdom	The ship ran aground on the Haisborough Sands, in the North Sea off the coast of Norfolk and was abandoned by her crew, who were rescued by the Sea Palling Lifeboat. She was on a voyage from South Shields, County Durham to Cartagena, Spain.
Reform	Stralsund	The galeas was driven ashore on Amager, Denmark. She was on a voyage from Riga to Hartlepool, County Durham, United Kingdom. She was refloated.
Sparrowhawk	United Kingdom	The ship sprang a leak and foundered in the Atlantic Ocean (45°20′N 8°40′W). Her crew were rescued by the schooner Cornelia Louisa (Netherlands). Sparrowhawk was on a voyage from Sunderland, County Durham to Seville, Spain.

== 14 October ==
List of shipwrecks: 14 October 1865
Ship	State	Description
Caroline	Prussia	The brig ran aground at North Shields, Northumberland, United Kingdom. She was on a voyage from Riga, Russia to Hartlepool, County Durham, United Kingdom.
Fortuna	United Kingdom	The brig ran aground at North Shields. She was on a voyage from Memel to North Shields.
Hope	United Kingdom	The smack sank at Hurst Castle, Hampshire with the loss of her captain. She was on a voyage from Swanage, Dorset to Hurst Castle.
Marianus	United Kingdom	The full-rigged ship was wrecked near Savannah, Georgia, United States. Her seventeen crew were rescued.
Victor Hudson	(United Kingdom of Great Britain and Ireland) British North America	The schooner was abandoned in the Atlantic Ocean (49°16′N 39°32′W). Her crew were rescued by Abbey Craig (United Kingdom). Victor Hudson was on a voyage from the Clyde to Quebec City, Province of Canada, British North America.
Sea Fan	United States	The schooner was lost on York Ledges. Crew saved.

== 15 October ==
List of shipwrecks: 15 October 1865
Ship	State	Description
Atlanta	United States	The 1,054-ton screw steamer sprang a leak and foundered in the North Atlantic Ocean (36°03′N 72°30′W) with the loss of 47 of the 52 people on board. Survivors took to a raft; they were rescued on 18 October by the barque William A. Anderson United States. Atlanta was on a voyage from New Orleans, Louisiana to New York.
Betsey	United Kingdom	The ship departed from Crail, Fife for Shoreham-by-Sea, Sussex. No further trace, presumed foundered with the loss of all hands.
Ida	(United Kingdom of Great Britain and Ireland) British North America	The schooner was wrecked at "Moosepeck Head Harbour", Maine, United States. Her crew were rescued. She was on a voyage from Bridgetown, Barbados to Boston, Massachusetts, United States.

== 16 October ==
List of shipwrecks: 16 October 1865
Ship	State	Description
Brilliant	United States	The 440-ton sidewheel paddle steamer burned on the Mississippi River at New Madrid, Missouri, after an oil lamp exploded on board. Sixty-five people on board escaped to shore.
Dash	United Kingdom	The ship was driven ashore on Calve Island, Argyllshire. She was on a voyage from Newcastle upon Tyne, Northumberland to Dublin. She was refloated and taken in to Tobermory, Isle of Mull.
William and Alexander	United Kingdom	The ship was driven ashore east of "the Baltimore". She was on a voyage from Helmsdale, Sutherland to the Caledonian Canal.

== 17 October ==
List of shipwrecks: 17 October 1865
Ship	State	Description
Agnes	United Kingdom	The schooner was driven ashore and wrecked at Goswick, Northumberland with the loss of all hands.
Agnes	United Kingdom	The ship was driven ashore and wrecked at Maidenkirk, Wigtownshire with the loss of all four crew.
Bostona No. 2	United States	The 304-ton sidewheel paddle steamer struck a snag and sank at Craigs Bar on the Ohio River between Cincinnati, Ohio and Carrollton, Kentucky. She later was refloated.
Burnsmouth	United Kingdom	The barque ran aground off the "Nolema Islands". She was on a voyage from Shanghai, China to Liverpool, Lancashire. She was refloated and taken in to Singapore, Straits Settlements, where she arrived on 29 October.
Fairlina	Sweden	The ship collided with Herman (Bremen) in the English Channel 20 nautical miles (37 km) south south west of Portland, Dorset, United Kingdom and was abandoned by her crew. She was on a voyage from Stockholm to Liverpool, Lancashire. Fairlina was towed in to Weymouth, Dorset by the steamship Newton Colville (United Kingdom).
Industry	United Kingdom	The sloop ran aground off Cramond Island, Lothian and was severely damaged. She was on a voyage from Montrose, Forfarshire to Bo'ness, Lothian.
Jean and Catherine	United Kingdom	The smack was driven ashore and wrecked on the Isle of Arran, in the Firth of Clyde. Her crew were rescued.
Maria Stella, or Mary Stella	United Kingdom	The fishing lugger collided with the lugger Arrow (United Kingdom), capsized and sank off Lambay Island, County Dublin. Her crew were rescued.
Ocean	United Kingdom	The schooner was driven ashore 4 nautical miles (7.4 km) east of Dunbar, Lothian. Her six crew were rescued. She was on a voyage from Bo'ness to London.
Robert Hood	United Kingdom	The sloop foundered in the North Sea off Newbiggin-by-the-Sea, Northumberland. Both crew were rescued by the Newbiggin Lifeboat. She was on a voyage from Glasgow, Renfrewshire to Bridlington, Yorkshire.
Sir Robert Peel	United Kingdom	The smack capsized and sank off the Kyles of Bute with the loss of two of her eleven crew. She was raised on 23 October.
Thomas and Margaret	United Kingdom	The schooner foundered in the North Sea off Happisburgh, Norfolk. Her crew were rescued. She was on a voyage from Goole, Yorkshire to Maidstone, Kent.
Thompson	United Kingdom	The brig was driven ashore near Hellevoetsluis, Zeeland, Netherlands.
Victor	United Kingdom	The schooner was driven ashore on Calve Island, Argyllshire. She was on a voyage from Danzig to Holyhead, Anglesey. She was later refloated and taken in to Holyhead, where she arrived on 28 October.
Waterwitch	United Kingdom	The tug was wrecked at South Queensferry, Lothian. She was on a voyage from Leith to Port Edgar, Lothian.

== 18 October ==
List of shipwrecks: 18 October 1865
Ship	State	Description
Ann	United Kingdom	The fishing smack foundered off the Holy Isle, in the Firth of Clyde with the loss of all four people on board.
Berry, or Bury	United Kingdom	The schooner was wrecked on Taylor's Bank, in Liverpool Bay. Her three crew were rescued. She was on a voyage from Newry, County Antrim to Boston.
Fear Not	United Kingdom	The schooner ran aground off St. Andrews, Fife and was wrecked with the loss of one of the five people on board. She was on a voyage from London to Dundee, Forfarshire. She was refloated on 22 November and towed in to Tayport, Fife on 24 November.
Friends	United Kingdom	The smack was wrecked at St. Davids Head, Pembrokeshire with the loss of one of her three crew. She was on a voyage from St. Davids to Milford Haven.
Harcourt	United Kingdom	The brig was wrecked 5 nautical miles (9.3 km) north of Berwick upon Tweed, Northumberland with the loss of one of her eight crew. She was on a voyage from Burntisland, Fife to Copenhagen, Denmark.
Hawk	United Kingdom	The sloop was driven ashore at Coldingham, Berwickshire with the loss of all hands.
Henrietta	Norway	The schooner was wrecked at Burnmouth, Berwickshire with the loss of all hands, at least three lives.
Janet Allison	United Kingdom	The brig was wrecked 5.5 nautical miles (10.2 km) north of Blyth, Northumberland with the loss of seven of her eight crew, her captain alone surviving. She was on her maiden voyage, from Dundee, Forfarshire to the Rio Grande.
Jens Hordenstoft Minde	Denmark	The ship ran aground. She was on a voyage from Odense to Newcastle upon Tyne, Northumberland. She was refloated and put in to Fredrikshavn in a leaky condition.
Lady Gordon Cumming	United Kingdom	The schooner was wrecked at Gamle Hellesund, Norway. She was on a voyage from Stettin to Leith, Lothian.
Margaretha Mathilde	Netherlands	The galiot was driven ashore at Redcar, Yorkshire, United Kingdom. She was refloated with assistance from the tug Admiral (United Kingdom).
Martha	United Kingdom	The schooner was wrecked at Lindisfarne, Northumberland. Her four crew were rescued by rocket apparatus. She was on a voyage from London to Newcastle upon Tyne, Northumberland.
Newcastle and Berwick Packet	United Kingdom	The sloop was wrecked at Coldingham. Her four crew were rescued. She was on a voyage from "Balantrail" to Newcastle upon Tyne, Northumberland.
Ocean	United Kingdom	The ship was driven ashore 4 nautical miles (7.4 km) east of Dunbar, Lothian. Her crew survived. She was on a voyage from Bo'ness, Lothian to London.
Rapid	Norway	The schooner was wrecked near Widdrington, Northumberland with the loss of five of her six crew. She was on a voyage from Sunderland, County Durham, United Kingdom to Christiania.
Sisters	United Kingdom	The schooner was driven ashore and wrecked at Lydd, Kent.
Speedwell	United Kingdom	The schooner struck the Drum Sands and sank. She was on a voyage from Granton, Lothian to St. Margaret's Hope, Orkney Islands.
Superior	United Kingdom	The schooner ran aground on The Shingles, off the Isle of Wight. She was on a voyage from Waterford to Southampton, Hampshire. She was refloated and resumed her voyage.
Tresspole	United Kingdom	The collier, a brig, sprang a leak and foundered in the North Sea 4 nautical miles (7.4 km) east by south of the Spurn Lighthouse, Yorkshire. Her crew were rescued by the smack Pet (United Kingdom). Tresspole was on a voyage from Sunderland to Ramsgate, Kent.
Vigilant	United Kingdom	The tug broke from her moorings and foundered at North Shields, Northumberland. Both crew survived.
William and Mary	United Kingdom	The tug broke from her moorings collided with the tug Olive Branch (United Kingdom) and was wrecked at North Shields.

== 19 October ==
List of shipwrecks: 19 October 1865
Ship	State	Description
Agnes	United Kingdom	The schooner was driven ashore at Donna Nook, Lincolnshire. Her crew were rescued. She was on a voyage from Antwerp, Belgium to Newcastle upon Tyne, Northumberland. She subsequently became a wreck.
Carioca	France	The ship was wrecked on the Château-le-toc Rock, Alderney, Channel Islands with the loss of fourteen of her 39 crew. She was on a voyage from Havre de Grâce, Seine-Inférieure to Rio de Janeiro, Brazil.
Chance	United Kingdom	The ship was driven ashore at "Monckwick", Russia. Her crew were rescued. She was on a voyage from Kronstadt, Russia to Hull, Yorkshire.
Delphin	Stettin	The brig was driven ashore on Amager, Denmark. She was on a voyage from Stettin to Sunderland, County Durham, United Kingdom.
Elizabeth	United Kingdom	The schooner capsized and sank off Whitby, Yorkshire with the loss of all three hands.
George Robinson	United Kingdom	The brig was driven ashore at Seaton Delaval, County Durham. Her crew were rescued. She was on a voyage from London to South Shields, County Durham. George Robinson was refloated on 3 November and towed in to Hartlepool, County Durham.
John Kerr	United States	The ship departed from Mobile, Alabama for Boston, Massachusetts. No further trace, presumed foundered with the loss of all hands.
Le Cygne	France	The barque was wrecked on Alderney with the loss of all hands.
Margaret	United Kingdom	The ship was driven ashore and wrecked near North Berwick, Lothian.
Urgent	United Kingdom	The ship was abandoned in the Atlantic Ocean. Her crew were rescued by Hansa (Flag unknown). Urgent was on a voyage from Sunderland to Quebec City, Province of Canada, British North America.
Unnamed	Flag unknown	The ship was wrecked on Alderney with the loss of all hands.

== 20 October ==
List of shipwrecks: 20 October 1865
Ship	State	Description
Anton Osthoff	Kingdom of Hanover	The ship was wrecked at the mouth of the Rio Grande do Sul with the loss of five of her crew. She was on a voyage from Trieste to the Rio Grande do Sul.
Chance	United Kingdom	The collier, a brig, foundered 25 nautical miles (46 km) off Lowestoft, Suffolk. Her crew were rescued by the smack Lord Willoughby (United Kingdom). Chance was on a voyage from Sunderland, County Durham to Rotterdam, South Holland, Netherlands.
Circassian	United States	The steamship sprang a leak and was beached in Rocky Bay, Nova Scotia, British North America. All on board were rescued. She was on a voyage from Bremen to New York, United States.
Claire	United Kingdom	The ship was wrecked on the Mort Sand, Devon. She was on a voyage from Cardiff, Glamorgan to Saint-Nazaire, Loire-Inférieure, France.
Emerald	United Kingdom	The ship was wrecked at North Sunderland, County Durham with the loss of all hands.
John Medley	United Kingdom	The schooner foundered in the North Sea 20 nautical miles (37 km) north east of the Newarp Lightship ( Trinity House). Her crew were rescued by the smack Velocity (United Kingdom). John Medley was on a voyage from Lymington, Hampshire to South Shields, County Durham.
Juno	Netherlands	The barque was wrecked on the Longsand, in the North Sea off the coast of Essex, United Kingdom. Her crew reached the Galloper Lightship ( Trinity House). Juno was on a voyage from Rotterdam, South Holland to Rangoon, Burma.
Mary Bentley	United Kingdom	The ship ran aground on the Pelican Spit, off Galveston, Texas, United States. She was on a voyage from Galveston to Liverpool, Lancashire.
Medora	United Kingdom	The ship was wrecked at North Sunderland with the loss of all hands.
USS Nettle	United States Navy	The 50-ton sidewheel tug sank in the Mississippi River after colliding with a United States Navy ironclad.
Oliver Cromwell	United Kingdom	The yacht foundered in the North Sea. Her three crew were rescued by the schooner Wilhelmina (Denmark).
Percival	United Kingdom	The ship foundered in the Dogger Bank. Her crew were rescued by a fishing smack and a steamship. She was on a voyage from South Shields, County Durham to Hamburg or Havre de Grâce, Seine-Inférieure, France.
Sangalier	(United Kingdom of Great Britain and Ireland) Tasmania	The schooner left Hokitika, New Zealand and was not sighted again. She had a crew of four.

== 21 October ==
List of shipwrecks: 21 October 1865
Ship	State	Description
Adam Carr	United Kingdom	The ship ran aground on the Sheringham Shoal, in the North Sea off the coast of Norfolk. She was on a voyage from a Scottish port to Charleston, South Carolina, United States. She was refloated and taken in to Great Yarmouth, Norfolk in a leaky condition.
Augusta	United Kingdom	The ship foundered. Her crew were rescued. She was on a voyage from Queensferry to Liverpool, Lancashire.
Brownie	United Kingdom	The ship sprang a leak and sank in the Clyde at Greenock, Renfrewshire. Her crew were rescued.
Carl Ronniberg	Norway	The full-rigged ship was wrecked in the Weser. She was on a voyage from Bremen to Quebec City, Province of Canada, British North America.
Friends	United Kingdom	The collier, a brig, foundered in the North Sea. Her crew were rescued by the smack Violet (United Kingdom). Friends was on a voyage from South Shields, County Durham to Lowestoft, Suffolk.
Picton	United States	The barque departed from the Turks Islands for New York. Presumed to have foundered in a hurricane on 22 or 23 October with the loss of all hands.

== 22 October ==
List of shipwrecks: 22 October 1865
Ship	State	Description
Annie	United States	The 350-ton sidewheel paddle steamer was run aground on Fig Island, Georgia to avoid sinking after she struck a snag in the Savannah River. She later was refloated.
Fairhaven	United Kingdom	The ship was wrecked on the Carysfort Reef. She was on a voyage from Galveston, Texas, United States to Liverpool, Lancashire.
Lucknow	(United Kingdom of Great Britain and Ireland) Guernsey	The barque ran aground on the Black Middens, in the North Sea off the coast of County Durham. She was refloated and resumed her voyage.
Majestic	United States	The 201-ton sternwheel paddle steamer burned at Point Coupee, Louisiana.
Mary A. Vernon	United Kingdom	The ship was abandoned in the Atlantic Ocean. Her crew were rescued by Dolphin (United States). Mary A. Vernon was on a voyage from Liverpool, Lancashire to Newhaven, Connecticut, United States.
Swift	United Kingdom	The schooner foundered in the North Sea. Her crew were rescued by Maida (United Kingdom). Swift was on a voyage from Middlesbrough, Yorkshire to Riga, Russia.
Wannan	United Kingdom	The brig ran aground on the Middle Sand, in the North Sea off the coast of Essex. She was on a voyage from Hartlepool, County Durham to London. She floated off but consequently foundered off the Maplin Sand. Her crew were rescued.
Yosemite	United States	Carrying 350 passengers and nearly a ton of gold and silver, the 631-, 1,317-, or 1,319-ton steamer sank after her starboard boiler exploded just after she left the wharf at Rio Vista, California. One source reports that at least between 42 and 51 people died, while another claims that 150 died and 50 were injured. The ship later was refloated, repaired and lengthened, and returned to service.

== 23 October ==
List of shipwrecks: 23 October 1865
Ship	State	Description
Alarm	United Kingdom	The ship was abandoned in the Atlantic Ocean. Her crew were rescued by Theresa (United Kingdom). Alarm was on a voyage from Labrador, British North America to Porto, Portugal.
HMS Bulldog	Royal Navy	The Bulldog-class sloop ran aground off Cap Haïtien, Haiti, during a British punitive expedition against Haitian rebels. Her crew were rescued by 22 December ( Haitian Navy). HMS Bulldog was set afire and blown up to prevent her capture by Haitian rebels.
Delphin	Norway	The ship sprang a leak and was beached at Granton, Lothian, United Kingdom. She was on a voyage from Newcastle upon Tyne, Northumberland, United Kingdom to Randers.
D. H. Mount	United States	The 321-ton screw steamer foundered in the North Atlantic Ocean off the United States East Coast between Cape Hatteras, North Carolina, and Jacksonville, Florida, with the loss of 24 lives.
Elizabeth	United Kingdom	The ship struck a sunken wreck in the North Sea and was damaged. She was on a voyage from Newcastle upon Tyne, Northumberland to Honfleur, Calvados, France. She was assisted in to Harwich, Essex in a leaky condition.
Helen	United Kingdom	The brig ran aground on the Maplin Sands, in the North Sea off the coast of Essex. She was on a voyage from Kronstadt, Russia to London.
Jane M. Hayward	United States	The barque was driven ashore north of Cape Florida, Florida. She was on a voyage from New Orleans, Louisiana to Havre de Grâce, Seine-Inférieure, France.
Lily	United Kingdom	The ketch was wrecked on the Goodwin Sands, Kent. Her crew were rescued by the lugger Princess Alice (United Kingdom). Lily was on a voyage from Hartlepool, County Durham to Portsmouth, Hampshire. She was refloated with assistance from a tug and the Ramsgate Lifeboat, but consequently foundered in the Gull Stream.
Matilda	United Kingdom	The smack was driven ashore and wrecked at "Blackball", Devon.
Prince of Wales	United Kingdom	The Mersey Flat was driven ashore in the River Dee. Her crew were rescued.
Valorogue	Haiti	The steamship was sunk off Cap Haïtien by cannon fire from HMS Bulldog (Royal Navy). Some of her crew were rescued by USS De Soto (United States Navy).
Unnamed	United Kingdom	The schooner was driven ashore in the River Dee. Her crew were rescued.

== 24 October ==
List of shipwrecks: 24 October 1865
Ship	State	Description
Attile	United Kingdom	The ship was wrecked on Barbuda. Her crew were rescued. She was on a voyage from Cardiff, Glamorgan to Saint Thomas, Virgin Islands.
Cato	United Kingdom	The ship ran aground on the Blacktail Spit, in the Thames Estuary. She was on a voyage from Kronstadt, Russia to London.
Edward Maria	United Kingdom	The ship ran aground on the Blacktail Spit.
Mersey	United Kingdom	The ship foundered off the coast of Florida, United States with the loss of nine of her thirteen crew. Survivors were rescued four days later by the steamship Newburn (United States). Mersey was on a voyage from Santa Anna, in the Gulf of Mexico to Cork or Falmouth, Cornwall.
Otter	United Kingdom	The steamship collided with the steamship Gablille (France and ran aground in the Elbe. All on board were rescued. Otter was on a voyage from Hamburg to Newcastle upon Tyne, Northumberland. She was refloated and put back to Hamburg.
Syrian	United Kingdom	The steamship ran aground in the Queen's Channel. She was on a voyage from Alexandria, Egypt to Liverpool, Lancashire. She was refloated with assistance from the tug United Kingdom (United Kingdom) and resumed her voyage, but ran aground on the Burbo Bank, in Liverpool Bay. She was refloated with the assistance of United Kingdom and three other tugs and taken in to Birkenhead, Cheshire.
Venelia	United Kingdom	The schooner foundered in the English Channel off Beachy Head, Sussex. Her crew were rescued by the schooner Lively (United Kingdom). Venelia was on a voyage from Poole, Dorset to Goole, Yorkshire.

== 25 October ==
List of shipwrecks: 25 October 1865
Ship	State	Description
Alecto, or Electra	United Kingdom	The sloop was driven ashore at Lindisfarne, Northumberland. She was on a voyage from South Shields, County Durham to Montrose, Forfarshire. Her crew were rescued. She was refloated and taken into Lindisfarne in a severely damaged condition.
Ann Patterson	United Kingdom	The brig was wrecked at Egmond aan Zee, North Holland, Netherlands. She was on a voyage from Sunderland, County Durham to the Nieuw Diep. Captained by Henry Royal of Seaham, five of the seven crew died in this wreck.
Assiduous	United Kingdom	The ship collided with the brig Buono Vento (Norway) and sank in the North Sea 30 nautical miles (56 km) off Texel, North Holland, Netherlands with the loss of two of her seven crew. She was on a voyage from South Shields to Schiedam, South Holland, Netherlands.
Blair	United Kingdom	The ship was driven ashore at Larne, County Antrim. She was on a voyage from Troon, Ayrshire to Belfast, County Antrim.
Blossom	United Kingdom	The ship was driven ashore 5 nautical miles (9.3 km) east of Nairn. Her crew were rescued. She was on a voyage from Inverness to Findhorn, Moray.
Brandon	United Kingdom	The brig was driven ashore and wrecked at Macduff, Aberdeenshire. Her crew were rescued by rocket apparatus. She was on a voyage from Königsberg, Prussia to Leith, Lothian.
Carl	Prussia	The schooner was wrecked at Ringkøbing, Denmark. Her crew were rescued. She was on a voyage from Harburg to Hartlepool, County Durham, United Kingdom.
Express	United Kingdom	The sailing barge was driven ashore at Wells-next-the-Sea, Norfolk. She was on a voyage from Great Yarmouth, Norfolk to Hartlepool. She was refloated on 1 November.
Georgina	United Kingdom	The ship was wrecked near Bude, Cornwall with the loss of two of her six crew. She was on a voyage from Arkhangelsk, Russia to Cardiff, Glamorgan.
Pearl, and Sovereign	United Kingdom	The paddle tug Pearl was wrecked on the Whitby Rock. She was towing the lighter Sovereign, which was also wrecked on the rock. The seven crew of Pearl got on board Sovereign and were then rescued.
Republic	United States	The sidewheel paddle steamer sank in a hurricane in the Atlantic Ocean approximately 100 nautical miles (190 km) southeast of Savannah, Georgia, with the loss of 34 lives.
Walter Frederick	United Kingdom	The sloop was driven ashore and wrecked between Cullen and Portknockie, Moray with the loss of all three crew.
William Bartlett	United Kingdom	The ship ran aground at Fraserburgh, Aberdeenshire. She was on a voyage from Sunderland, County Durham to Fraserburgh. She was refloated.

== 26 October ==
List of shipwrecks: 26 October 1865
Ship	State	Description
Ann and Mary	United Kingdom	The brig was driven ashore and wrecked at Whitburn, County Durham. Her nine crew were rescued by the Whitburn Lifeboat Thomas Wilson ( Royal National Lifeboat Institution).
Cyprian Queen	United Kingdom	The ship was driven ashore 4 nautical miles (7.4 km) from Larnaca, Cyprus. She was refloated the next day.
Emma	Norway	The brig was abandoned in the North Sea. Her crew were rescued by the brig Patriot (Norway). Emma was on a voyage from Sannesund to Antwerp, Belgium.
George	United Kingdom	The brigantine was abandoned off "Dunlington", Yorkshire. Her five crew were rescued by the steamship Thames (United Kingdom). George was on a voyage from Hartlepool, County Durham to Rochester, Kent. She was discovered derelict in the North Sea 30 nautical miles (56 km) east south east of Flamborough Head, Yorkshire by the smacks Gamester and Fairy (both United Kingdom) on 28 October and was taken in to Grimsby, Lincolnshire.
Marguerette	United Kingdom	The barque was wrecked on the Artia Bank, in the River Plate. She was on a voyage from Cette, Hérault, France to Buenos Aires, Argentina.
Minny of Mina	United Kingdom	The schooner ran aground on the Niding Reef, in the Baltic Sea off the coast of Sweden. She was on a voyage from Königsberg, Prussia to Montrose, Forfarshire.
Orison	United States	The ship was abandoned in the Atlantic Ocean.
Petrus	Norway	The brig was driven ashore at "Fornby", Denmark. She was on a voyage from Dram to Rye, Sussex, United Kingdom.
Wilshere	United Kingdom	The ship was wrecked at Cucq, Pas-de-Calais, France. Her crew were rescued. She was on a voyage from Sunderland, County Durham to Le Tréport, Seine-Inférieure, France.
Unnamed	Prussia	The barque was driven ashore at Whitburn. Her crew were rescued by rocket apparatus.

== 27 October ==
List of shipwrecks: 27 October 1865
Ship	State	Description
Albion	United Kingdom	The brig ran aground on the Spit of Passage, off the coast of County Cork. She was on a voyage from Quebec City, Province of Canada, British North America to Ramsey, Isle of Man.
Amphitrite	United Kingdom	The ship was driven ashore near "Taxa", China.
Ann and Mary	United Kingdom	The brig was driven ashore and wrecked at Souter Point, Northumberland. Her crew were rescued by the Whitburn Lifeboat.
Border Chieftain	United Kingdom	The ship was wrecked at Egmond aan Zee.
Centaur	United Kingdom	The schooner foundered in the North Sea off Pakefield Suffolk with the loss of two of her four crew. Survivors were rescued by the brigantine Venus (United Kingdom) and were later taken off by the Kessingland Lifeboat. Centaur was on a voyage from Newcastle upon Tyne, Northumberland to Exeter, Devon.
Elizabeth	United Kingdom	The brig collided with a barque and was abandoned off Great Yarmouth, Norfolk. Her crew got on board the barque Brothers (United Kingdom). Elizabeth was on a voyage from Sunderland to London. She was subsequently reboarded and assisted into Great Yarmouth in a severely leaky condition.
Elize	Duchy of Holstein	The galiot was driven ashore at Egmond aan Zee.
Hope	United Kingdom	The ship ran aground at Ramsgate, Kent.
Iduna	Prussia	The barque was driven ashore at Marsden, County Durham. Her sixteen crew were rescued by rocket apparatus. She was on a voyage from London, United Kingdom to the River Wear or the River Tyne. She was consequently condemned.
Imogene	United Kingdom	The sloop was driven ashore and severely damaged 3 nautical miles (5.6 km) east of Dunbar, Lothian. Her four crew survived. She was on a voyage from Newcastle upon Tyne to Dunbar.
John Wright	United Kingdom	The schooner was driven ashore at Lowestoft, Suffolk. Her crew were rescued. She was on a voyage from Newcastle upon Tyne to London.
Lucknow	United Kingdom	The barque ran aground on the Galloper Sand, in the North Sea off the coast of Norfolk. She was on a voyage from South Shields, County Durham to Arica, Chile. She was refloated and assisted in to Great Yarmouth, Norfolk in a leaky condition.
R. B. Taney	United States	The 301-ton sidewheel paddle steamer was stranded at Mobile, Alabama.
Rebecca	United Kingdom	The brig was driven ashore on Amrum, Kingdom of Hanover. She was on a voyage from Hamburg to South Shields. She was refloated and taken in to Wyk auf Fohr, Duchy of Holstein in a leaky condition.
Robert Airey	United Kingdom	The tug foundered in the North Sea off the coast of Yorkshire with the loss of all four crew.
Sisters	United Kingdom	The ship ran aground on the Gunfleet Sand, in the North Sea off the coast of Essex. She was refloated and assisted in to Harwich, Essex.
Spes and Fides	Norway	The ship ran aground on the Loinir Rocks, near Larvik. She was refloated the next day.
Superior	United Kingdom	The schooner ran aground on the Stoney Binks, off the mouth of the Humber. Her six crew were rescued by the Spurn Lifeboat. She was on a voyage from Portmadoc, Caernarfonshire to Middlesbrough, Yorkshire.
Three Sisters	United Kingdom	The ship was driven ashore at Harwich. She was on a voyage from South Shields to London. She was refloated with assistance and found to be leaky. Also reported as a brig that ran aground on the Goodwin Sands, Kent that was refloated and taken in to Harwich in a leaky condition.
Town	United Kingdom	The brig was driven ashore and wrecked at Macduff, Aberdeenshire. Her crew were rescued by Manby's rocket apparatus.
Venus	United Kingdom	The brigantine foundered in the North Sea off the coast of Suffolk. Her seven crew survived. She was on a voyage from Newcastle upon Tyne to Rochester, Kent.
Zephyr	United Kingdom	The brig was driven ashore at Valencia Island, County Cork.

== 28 October ==
List of shipwrecks: 28 October 1865
Ship	State	Description
Aboyne	United Kingdom	The brig foundered in the North Sea off Spurn Point, Yorkshire. Her crew were rescued by a smack. She was on a voyage from Hartlepool, County Durham to London.
Charles Adair	United Kingdom	The smack was wrecked at Balbriggan, County Dublin. Her crew were rescued.
Edith	(United Kingdom of Great Britain and Ireland) Barbados	The brig dragged her anchors and came ashore at Castle Point, St Mawes, Cornwall. Her crew were rescued. She was on a voyage from Baltimore, Maryland, United States to Rotterdam, South Holland, Netherlands.
Emma Cooley	United Kingdom	The schooner ran aground at Berwick upon Tweed, Northumberland. She was refloated.
Faith	United Kingdom	The barque was driven ashore at Winterton-on-Sea, Norfolk. Her crew were rescued. She was on a voyage from Boston, Lincolnshire to London.
Henry	United Kingdom	The fishing smack was driven ashore at Great Yarmouth, Norfolk. Her crew were rescued.
Margaret and Jane	United Kingdom	The brig was driven ashore and wrecked on the Île de Groix, Morbihan, France with the loss of four of her seven crew. She was on a voyage from Santander, Spain to the River Mersey.
Providence	France	The brig was wrecked near Hayle, Cornwall, United Kingdom with the loss of one of her five crew. After capsizing twice, four survivors were rescued by the RNLI St. Ives lifeboat Moses. She was on a voyage from Cardiff to Saint-Malo, Ille-et-Vilaine.
Reaper	United Kingdom	The collier, a brig, was wrecked on the Naylor Rock, off Margate, Kent. Her crew were rescued by the Margate Lifeboat.
Sarah	United Kingdom	The schooner was abandoned in the Atlantic Ocean. Her crew were rescued. She was on a voyage from Cardigan to Valencia, Spain.
Sarah Ellen	United Kingdom	The ship was driven ashore at Swansea, Glamorgan. She was on a voyage from Youghal, County Cork to Port Talbot, Glamorgan. She was refloated the next day and was towed in to Swansea.
Sardine	United Kingdom	The ship was driven ashore and sank at Carnlough, County Antrim.
Swift	United Kingdom	The lugger was driven ashore and damaged at Balbriggan. Her crew were rescued.

== 29 October ==
List of shipwrecks: 29 October 1865
Ship	State	Description
Akbar	United Kingdom	The ship ran aground on the Long Nose Sand, off the north Kent coast. She was on a voyage from Cardiff, Glamorgan to Bristol, Gloucestershire.
Andreus	Stettin	The schooner was driven ashore on Læsø, Denmark. She was on a voyage from Grimsby, Lincolnshire, United Kingdom to Stettin.
Anne	United Kingdom	The smack was driven ashore and severely damaged at Rhiw, Caernarfonshire. Her crew were rescued. She was on a voyage from Wicklow to Flint.
Bovielaw, or Rarelaw	United Kingdom	The ship ran aground on the Long Nose Sand. She was on a voyage from Cardiff to London.
Cecilie	Hamburg	The barque was wrecked near "Catarst".
Charles Little	United Kingdom	The barque was driven ashore at Bridlington, Yorkshire. Her crew were rescued. She was on a voyage from Sunderland, County Durham to Maldon, Essex. She was refloated on 30 October and taken in to Bridlington.
Cricket	United Kingdom	The steamship foundered in the English Channel 12 nautical miles (22 km) off Newhaven, Sussex. Her crew were rescued.
Cyrene	United Kingdom	The schooner was driven ashore near Cooley Point, County Louth. Her crew were rescued. She was on a voyage from Ayr to Dublin.
Czarina	United Kingdom	The steamship was abandoned in the North Sea 90 nautical miles (170 km) off Kristiansand, Norway. Her crew were rescued by a Norwegian barque. She was taken in tow by the steamship Ladoga (United Kingdom) but foundered on 31 October.
Desire	United Kingdom	The schooner was driven ashore and wrecked at Ness Point, Suffolk. Her crew were rescued. She was on a voyage from Portmadoc, Caernarfonshire to Boston, Lincolnshire.
Draupner	United Kingdom	The ship ran aground on the Galloper Sand, in the North Sea off the coast of Norfolk. She was on a voyage from South Shields, County Durham to Alexandria, Egypt. She was refloated and taken in to Great Yarmouth, Norfolk in a severely leaky condition. Subsequently repaired and returned to service.
Emma	United Kingdom	The schooner ran aground on the South Bull, in the Irish Sea off the coast of County Dublin. Her crew were rescued by the Poolbeg Lifeboat. She was on a voyage from Ardrossan, Ayrshire to Newport, Monmouthshire.
Fortune	United Kingdom	The sloop was driven ashore at Whitby, Yorkshire.
Franklin	United Kingdom	The schooner was driven ashore in the River Dee. Her crew were rescued by a lifeboat. She was on a voyage from Belfast, County Antrim to Maryport, Cumberland. Franklin was later refloated.
Frederick	United Kingdom	The barque was driven ashore 2 nautical miles (3.7 km) north of Bridlington. Her crew were rescued. Frederick was on a voyage from Grimsby, Lincolnshire to Blyth, Northumberland. She was refloated on 30 October and taken in to Bridlington.
Garibaldi	United Kingdom	The ship was driven ashore 2 nautical miles (3.7 km) north of Bridlington. Her crew were rescued. She was on a voyage from London to West Hartlepool, County Durham. She was refloated on 13 November and taken in to Hartlepool, County Durham.
Henry	United Kingdom	The fishing smack was driven ashore and wrecked at Great Yarmouth. Her crew were rescued.
Larke	United Kingdom	The brig was driven ashore and wrecked at Winterton-on-Sea, Norfolk. Her crew were rescued. She was on a voyage from Boston, Lincolnshire to London.
Linda Flor	United Kingdom	The brigantine struck the pier and ran aground at Lowestoft, Suffolk and was damaged. She was on a voyage from Middlesbrough, Yorkshire to Dunkirk, Nord, France. She was refloated and taken in to Lowestoft in a severely leaky condition.
Margaret	United Kingdom	The sloop was destroyed by fire off Lindisfarne, Northumberland.
Marion	United Kingdom	The brigantine was driven ashore and wrecked at Portbeg, Wigtownshire. Her crew were rescued. She was on a voyage from the Belfast Lough to Caernarfon.
Ocean	United Kingdom	The smack foundered in the Bristol Channel off Caldy Island, Pembrokeshire. Her crew were rescued.
Primrose	United Kingdom	The Mersey Flat was driven ashore in Carmarthen Bay. She was on a voyage from Cardiff to Aberystwyth, Cardiganshire.
Prince Arthur	United Kingdom	The brig was driven ashore and wrecked in Palmer's Bay, Isle of Thanet, Kent.
Prince Rupert	United Kingdom	The ship was driven ashore and damaged at Liverpool, Lancashire. She was on a voyage from Liverpool to Melbourne, Victoria. She was refloated and taken into Liverpool.
Prospect	United Kingdom	The sloop was driven ashore south of Dragør, Denmark. She was on a voyage from Eyemouth, Berwickshire to Danzig. She was refloated on 1 November and taken in to Helsingør, Denmark for repairs.
Royal Highlander	United Kingdom	The fishing boat was wrecked at Balbriggan, County Dublin. Her crew were rescued.
Sardinia	United Kingdom	The ship was driven ashore and wrecked on Sheep Island, Pembrokeshire. Thirteen crew were rescued. She was being towed from Bristol, Gloucestershire to Milford Haven, Pembrokeshire.
St. Malo	France	The ship was wrecked at Hayle, Cornwall, United Kingdom with the loss of two of her crew. Survivors were rescued by the Hayle Lifeboat.
Syren	United Kingdom	The schooner was wrecked at Dundalk, County Louth.
Vesper	United Kingdom	The schooner was driven ashore and wrecked at Bembridge, Isle of Wight. She was on a voyage from Neath, Glamorgan to Saint-Valery-sur-Somme, Somme, France.
Victor	United Kingdom	The fishing smack was wrecked at Drogheda, County Louth with the loss of five of her six crew.
Vulcan	United Kingdom	The fishing smack was wrecked at Drogheda. Two crew were rescued.
Unnamed	United Kingdom	The schooner was wrecked on Scroby Sands, Norfolk.

== 30 October ==
List of shipwrecks: 30 October 1865
Ship	State	Description
Amelia	United Kingdom	The brig was driven ashore and damaged on Hayling Island, Hampshire. She was refloated and taken in to Portsmouth, Hampshire.
Cerese	United Kingdom	The schooner was driven ashore and wrecked at Hollesley Bay, Suffolk. Her crew were rescued. She was on a voyage from Gravesend, Kent to South Shields, County Durham.
Iroquois	United Kingdom	The brig was abandoned in the English Channel. She was on a voyage from Hartlepool, County Durham to Honfleur, Calvados, France. She was driven ashore at Dover, Kent. Iroquois was boarded by the Coast Guard and a Receiver of Wreck with the aim of refloating her, but she started to break up. All on board were rescued by rocket apparatus.
John Wesley	United Kingdom	The schooner was driven ashore and wrecked on Heligoland. Her crew were rescued. She was on a voyage from Portmadoc to Hamburg.
Juno	(Russian Empire) Grand Duchy of Finland	The schooner was abandoned in the North Sea. She was on a voyage from Hull, Yorkshire, United Kingdom to Vyborg.
Ligo	United Kingdom	The collier, a schooner, was driven ashore at Corton, Suffolk. Her four crew were rescued by the Coast Guard using rocket apparatus. She was refloated with assistance from the tug Rainbow (United Kingdom) and taken in to Lowestoft, Suffolk
Margaretha Johanna	Russia	The ship was driven ashore near Bolderāja. She was on a voyage from Middlesbrough, Yorkshire to Riga. She was refloated on 31 October and towed into Bolderāja.
Marion	United Kingdom	The ship was driven ashore and wrecked at Portbeg, Wigtownshire. Her crew were rescued. She was on a voyage from the Belfast Lough to Caernarfon.
Norma	United Kingdom	The ship was driven ashore at the South Foreland, Kent. She was refloated and assisted in to Ramsgate, Kent in a severely leaky condition.
Petrel	United States	The ship was driven ashore at "San Adreas". She was on a voyage from New York to Jacmel, Haiti. She had been refloated by 9 November.
Prince Edward	United Kingdom	The brig ran aground in the Belfast Lough.
Ringdove	United Kingdom	The barque was driven ashore and wrecked at Hollesley Bay.
Queen of Ava	United Kingdom	The barque was wrecked on Dassen Island. Her crew were rescued. She was on a voyage from Cardiff, Glamorgan to Cape Town, Cape Colony.
Shearwater	United Kingdom	The steamship was abandoned in the Atlantic Ocean. Her 21 crew were rescued by the barque Sea Nymph (Netherlands). Shearwater was on a voyage from Cardiff to Alexandria, Egypt.
Thomas Martin	United States	Bound for Charleston, South Carolina, with a cargo of lumber, the schooner drifted ashore on the coast of South Carolina at Folly Island north of Georgetown. She had been adrift since she was dismasted on 23 October in a storm in the North Atlantic Ocean off the coast of North Carolina between Cape Lookout and Frying Pan Shoals.
Vale of Avoca	United Kingdom	The schooner was driven ashore and wrecked near Milford Haven, Pembrokeshire.

== 31 October ==
List of shipwrecks: 31 October 1865
Ship	State	Description
Fortune	United Kingdom	The sloop ran aground at Whitby, Yorkshire. She was on a voyage from Boston, Lincolnshire to Middlesbrough, Yorkshire.
Jacobus Begeman	Netherlands	The ship was driven ashore on Ameland, Friesland, Netherlands. Her crew were rescued. she was on a voyage from Sunderland, County Durham, United Kingdom to Groningen.
Lady of the Lake	United Kingdom	The smack sprang a leak and was beached at Grimsby, Lincolnshire. She was on a voyage from Sunderland to Mistley, Essex.
Tzamados	United Kingdom	The steamship foundered in the English Channel off the Isle of Wight. Her thirteen crew survived. She was on a voyage from Dunkirk, Nord to Liverpool, Lancashire.
Victorine	France	The lugger was wrecked on a sandbank off the coast of Norfolk, United Kingdom with the loss of twenty of her 21 crew.

== Unknown date ==
List of shipwrecks: Unknown date October 1865
Ship	State	Description
Ann Stainton	United Kingdom	The ship was driven ashore and wrecked on Saaremaa, Russia. She was on a voyage from Copenhagen, Denmark to Vyborg, Grand Duchy of Finland.
Apus	United Kingdom	The ship was abandoned at sea. She was on a voyage from Saint Thomas, Virgin Islands to Saint John, New Brunswick, British North America.
Atlas	United Kingdom	The steamship was driven ashore at San Stefano, Ottoman Empire. She was on a voyage from Liverpool, Lancashire to Constantinople, Ottoman Empire. She was refloated and completed her voyage, arriving on 11 October.
Atlas	United Kingdom	The barque was driven ashore and damaged at Hayling Island, Hampshire. Her crew were rescued by the Hayling Lifeboat. She was on a voyage from South Shields, County Durham to Genoa, Italy. She was refloated on 1 November and taken in to Portsmouth, Hampshire.
Bedford	United Kingdom	The full-rigged ship capsized in the Baltic Sea off Helsinki, Grand Duchy of Finland. She was on a voyage from Kronstadt, Russia to the Amoor River. Bedford subsequently came ashore at Porkkalanniemi.
Benwell	United Kingdom	The paddle steamer sank at Leith, Lothian. She was refloated on 18 January 1866.
Betsey	United Kingdom	The brig was lost near Noordwijk, South Holland, Netherlands before 28 October. She was on a voyage from Sunderland, County Durham to Schiedam, South Holland.
Blackness	United Kingdom	The ship was driven ashore at Arkhangelsk, Russia. She was refloated and put back to Arkhangelsk.
Carlotta	(United Kingdom of Great Britain and Ireland) Bahamas	The steamship collided with the steamship Matanzas (United States) and sank off New Orleans, Louisiana, United States.
Charles Michaels	Belgium	The ship was driven ashore near Terneuzen, Zeeland, Netherlands. She was on a voyage from Antwerp to Akyab, Burma.
Clyde	United Kingdom	The ship ran aground at Chatham, Massachusetts, United States. She was on a voyage from Nova Scotia, British North America to Chatham. She was subsequently sold, refloated, and taken into Chatham where she was repaired.
Corsair	United Kingdom	The ship foundered in the Baltic Sea off Naissaar, Russia before 13 October. Her crew were rescued. She was on a voyage from Glückstadt, Duchy of Schleswig to Vyborg, Grand Duchy of Finland.
Cyanna	United Kingdom	The steamship was abandoned off Kristiansand, Norway. Her crew survived.
Czarina	Russia	The ship was abandoned in the North Sea. She was on a voyage from Kronstadt to Hull, Yorkshire, United Kingdom.
Dane	United Kingdom	The ship foundered at sea before 11 October. Her crew were rescued. She was on a voyage from Bristol, Gloucestershire to Alicante Spain.
Dover	United Kingdom	The ship was driven ashore on Stoneskar, Russia. She was on a voyage from Vyborg, Grand Duchy of Finland to Gloucester. She was refloated and put in to Fredrikshavn, Denmark in a waterlogged condition on 30 October.
Eastern Empire	United Kingdom	The ship ran aground in the Hooghly River. She was refloated and put back to Calcutta, India in a leaky condition.
Edith	United Kingdom	The ship was lost in the White Sea before 12 October. Her crew were rescued. She was on a voyage from Onega, Russia to London.
Emanuel	Norway	The brig was taken into the Nieuw Diep in a derelict condition.
Farsfern	United Kingdom)	The ship put in to Seville, Spain on fire and was scuttled. She was on a voyage from Swansea, Glamorgan to Seville.
Favorite	United Kingdom	The brigantine was driven ashore and wrecked in Hayling Bay, Hampshire. She was on a voyage from South Shields to Poole, Dorset.
Garrawalt	United Kingdom	The full-rigged ship was wrecked at Tainan, Formosa. She was on a voyage from Shanghai, China to London.
Gwen Jones	United Kingdom	The ship was driven ashore at Helsingør, Denmark. She was on a voyage from Portmadoc, Caernarfonshire to Danzig. She was refloated on 25 October and taken into Helsingør for repairs.
Hendrika Ellida	Netherlands	The coaster foundered off the North Foreland, Kent, United Kingdom. Her crew were rescued by a smack. She was on a voyage from Amsterdam, North Holland to Nantes, Loire-Inférieure, France.
Jane and Albert	Netherlands	The schooner was wrecked at Seyðisfjörður, Iceland. She was on a voyage from London, United Kingdom to Iceland.
John	United Kingdom	The sloop was driven ashore at Easington, County Durham.
Lady Raglan	United Kingdom	The ship was driven ashore on Öland, Sweden. She was on a voyage from Kronstadt to London. She was refloated in November and taken in to Kalmar.
Louise	Grand Duchy of Oldenburg	The ship was driven ashore between Saint Petersburg and Kronstadt. She was on a voyage from Saint Petersburg to Aberdeen, United Kingdom.
Martha Pope	United Kingdom	The brig sprang a leak and was abandoned off Cabo Frio, Brazil.
Mary	United Kingdom	The Humber Keel struck the Keadby Bridge and consequently sank in the River Trent at Althorpe, Lincolnshire. All five people on board survived. She was repaired and refloated.
Momentum	Sweden	The brig sprang a leak was abandoned in the North Sea. Her crew were rescued. She was on a voyage from Gävle to Calais, France. Momentum was subsequently towed in to North Shields, Northumberland, United Kingdom in a derelict condition.
North Star	United Kingdom	The ship foundered in the North Sea before 13 October.
Portsmouth	United Kingdom	The ship departed from Navassa, North Carolina, United States for Queenstown, County Cork in mid-October. No further trace, presumed foundered in the Atlantic Ocean with the loss of all hands.
Prince of Wales	United Kingdom	The ship was abandoned in the Atlantic Ocean. Her crew were rescued. She was on a voyage from Cardiff to Quebec City, Province of Canada, British North America.
Queen of the Isles	United Kingdom	The ship was wrecked at Cherbourg, Seine-Inférieure, France with the loss of all on board.
Regnera	United Kingdom	The ship was driven ashore near Narva, Russia.
Republic	United States	The steamboat suffered a boiler explosion on the Hudson River with the loss of 14 lives. She was on a voyage from Albany, New York to New York City.
Rival	France	The ship foundered in the English Channel off the coast of Cornwall, United Kingdom before 19 October.
Roland	Bremen	The ship was wrecked on Raas Island, Netherlands East Indies before 29 October. She was on a voyage from Batavia, Netherlands East Indies to Amsterdam, North Holland, Netherlands.
Sally Gale	United Kingdom	The ship ran aground at Arkhangelsk. She was on a voyage from Arkhangelsk to Aberdeen.
Stirling	United Kingdom	The ship was driven ashore in Gibraltar Bay. She was on a voyage from Smyrna, Ottoman Empire to Bristol, Gloucestershire.
Syrene	United Kingdom	The schooner was driven ashore at Ballagan Point, County Louth. Her crew were rescued.
Troquois	United Kingdom	The ship was driven ashore at Dover, Kent and was abandoned by her crew.
Tzamados	Flag unknown	The steamship was abandoned at sea. She was on a voyage from Dunkirk, Nord, France to Liverpool.
Una	United Kingdom	The schooner was driven ashore and wrecked at Theddlethorpe, Lincolnshire. Her crew were rescued. She was on a voyage from Lowestoft, Suffolk to Seaham, County Durham.
Undine	(United Kingdom of Great Britain and Ireland) New Zealand	The schooner stranded on a bank at Greymouth during October. She was washed clear and wrecked when the bank gave way during a flood the following month.
William Carvill	United Kingdom	The ship ran aground at Bombay, India. She was refloated.
Willid	Netherlands	The barque was destroyed by fire at Batavia, Netherlands East Indies.
