= List of shipwrecks in July 1855 =

The list of shipwrecks in July 1855 includes ships sunk, wrecked, grounded, or otherwise lost during July 1855.

== 1 July ==
List of shipwrecks: 1 July 1855
Ship	State	Description
Charles	United Kingdom	The schooner struck the Sail Rock, in the Virgin Islands and sank. She was on a voyage from Saint Thomas, Virgin Islands to the Turks Islands.
James Russel	United Kingdom	The ship was driven ashore at Towyn Capel, Anglesey. She was on a voyage from Bombay, India to Liverpool, Lancashire. She was refloated with assistance from a steamship and beached.

== 2 July ==
List of shipwrecks: 2 July 1855
Ship	State	Description
De Vreede	Netherlands	The galiot sank in the English Channel 12 nautical miles (22 km) off Penzance, Cornwall, United Kingdom. Her crew took to a boat and were rescued by HMRC Badger ( Board of Customs). De Vreede was on a voyage from Newcastle upon Tyne, Northumberland, United Kingdom to Seville, Spain.
Jacques	France	The ship was abandoned in the Indian Ocean. Her fourteen crew were rescued by David McIvor (United Kingdom). Jacques was on a voyage from Bombay, India to Marseille, Bouches-du-Rhône.

== 3 July ==
List of shipwrecks: 3 July 1855
Ship	State	Description
Lightfoot	United States	The ship was lost at the Sandheads, India. Her crew were rescued. She was on a voyage from London, United Kingdom to Calcutta, India.
Talisman	United States	The ship ran aground in Bedford's New Channel, India.

== 5 July ==
List of shipwrecks: 5 July 1855
Ship	State	Description
Amethyst	United Kingdom	The ship was driven ashore on Green Island, Nova Scotia, British North America. She was on a voyage from Quebec City, Province of Canada to the Clyde.. She was refloated on 17 July and resumed her voyage.
Margery	United Kingdom	The schooner ran aground on the Newcombe Sand, in the North Sea off the coast of Suffolk. She was refloated.

== 7 July ==
List of shipwrecks: 7 July 1855
Ship	State	Description
Kelvin	Victoria	The schooner was destroyed by fire off Mount Martha, Port Phillip Bay, Victoria Colony; the wreck was for auction on 27 July.
Washington	United Kingdom	The ship was wrecked on Cannoniers Point, Mauritius. She was on a voyage from Moulmein, Burma to Queenstown, County Cork.

== 8 July ==
List of shipwrecks: 8 July 1855
Ship	State	Description
Ceres	United Kingdom	The ship ran aground on the Newcombe Sands, in the North Sea off the coast of Suffolk. She was on a voyage from London to Königsberg, Prussia. She was refloated.
Magnolia Branner	United States	The steamship was destroyed by fire. Her crew were rescued. She was on a voyage from Red River to New Orleans, Louisiana.
Ohio	United Kingdom	The brig ran aground on the Scroby Sands, Norfolk. She was on a voyage from South Shields, County Durham to Constantinople, Ottoman Empire. She was refloated and put in to Great Yarmouth, Norfolk.
Phoenix	(United Kingdom of Great Britain and Ireland) Cape Colony	The paddle steamer was wrecked on the Ipili Rocks, in the Torres Strait. She was on a voyage from Sydney, New South Wales to Singapore.

== 9 July ==
List of shipwrecks: 9 July 1855
Ship	State	Description
Garlan	United Kingdom	The ship was driven ashore and wrecked at Dungeness, Kent. She was on a voyage from London to Ambriz, Portuguese West Africa.
Sultana	United Kingdom	The ship was wrecked on the Cobbler's Reef, off Barbados. She was on a voyage from Liverpool, Lancashire to Grenada.
Washington	United States	The ship was driven ashore by ice and wrecked in Ulban Bay in the western Sea of Okhotsk. The ship and her cargo of 300 barrels of whale oil were sold to the Lagoda (United States) the following day, which spent over a month scavenging from the wreck, selling various items from it to other ships. They then set fire to the wreck to get at its iron.

== 10 July ==
List of shipwrecks: 10 July 1855
Ship	State	Description
Mary Hale	United Kingdom	The ship ran aground on the Alligator Reef. She was on a voyage from New Orleans, Louisiana, United States to Liverpool, Lancashire. She was later refloated and taken in to New York, United States for repairs.
Westfriesland	Duchy of Holstein	The steamship ran aground off Egmond aan Zee, North Holland. She was on a voyage from London to Kampen.

== 11 July ==
List of shipwrecks: 11 July 1855
Ship	State	Description
Science	United Kingdom	The brig was abandoned and foundered off "Aquilas". She was on a voyage from "Rio Elba", Corsica, France to Newport, Monmouthshire.
Welsh	United Kingdom	The tug suffered a boiler explosion and sank at South Shields, County Durham. Her three crew were rescued. She was later refloated.

== 12 July ==
List of shipwrecks: 12 July 1855
Ship	State	Description
Pollux	Norway	The ship ran aground of a reef off Gotland, Sweden. She was on a voyage from Gävle to London, United Kingdom. She was refloated on 15 July and taken in to Slitohamn, Sweden.

== 13 July ==
List of shipwrecks: 13 July 1855
Ship	State	Description
Preussischer Adler	Prussia	The steamship ran aground off Queenstown, County Cork, United Kingdom. She was on a voyage from Queenstown to London, United Kingdom.
Sympathy	United Kingdom	The ship ran aground at Inverkeithing, Fife. She was on a voyage from Leith, Lothian to Inverkeithing. She was refloated but was condemned.

== 14 July ==
List of shipwrecks: 14 July 1855
Ship	State	Description
Balmoral	United Kingdom	The ship departed from Gravesend, Kent for Shanghai, China. No further trace, presumed foundered with the loss of all 30 crew.
Margaret	United Kingdom	The brig was wrecked at Ferryland Head, Newfoundland, British North America. Her crew were rescued. She was on a voyage from Pernambuco, Brazil to Saint John's, Newfoundland.
St. Abbs	United Kingdom	The East Indiaman was wrecked in the Seychelles with the loss of 22 lives. There were at last six survivors.

== 15 July ==
List of shipwrecks: 15 July 1855
Ship	State	Description
Mary Hannah	United States	The barque was driven ashore and wrecked on Rottumeroog, Groningen, Netherlands. Her crew were rescued. She was on a voyage from Mobile, Alabama to Hamburg.
Montreal	United Kingdom	The ship was driven ashore near La Rochelle, Charente-Inférieure. She had been refloated by 23 July.

== 16 July ==
List of shipwrecks: 16 July 1855
Ship	State	Description
16 July	United Kingdom	The ship was abandoned at sea. Her crew took to a boat and were rescued on 30 July. She was on a voyage from Callao, Peru to Queenstown, County Cork.

== 17 July ==
List of shipwrecks: 17 July 1855
Ship	State	Description
Orleans	United Kingdom	The barque foundered in the Pacific Ocean. Her crew survived. She was on a voyage from the Chincha Islands to an English port.
Phoenix	United Kingdom	The ship was lost in the Torres Straits. She was on a voyage from Sydney, New South Wales to China.
Sparkling Wave	United Kingdom	The ship ran aground in the Yangtze. She was on a voyage from Shanghai, China to London. She had been refloated by 2 August and had resumed her voyage.

== 18 July ==
List of shipwrecks: 18 July 1855
Ship	State	Description
Somerville	United States	The schooner was sunk while bound for Wilmington, North Carolina. Crew saved.

== 19 July ==
List of shipwrecks: 19 July 1855
Ship	State	Description
Brilliant	United Kingdom	The brigantine was abandoned in the Irish Sea 20 nautical miles (37 km) south east by east of the Mine Head Lighthouse, County Waterford. Her crew were rescued. She was on a voyage from the Clyde to Porto, Portugal.

== 20 July ==
List of shipwrecks: 20 July 1855
Ship	State	Description
Rusco Caster	United Kingdom	The ship ran aground on the Holm Sand, in the North Sea off the coast of Suffolk. She was on a voyage from Hartlepool, County Durham to London. She was refloated and taken in to Lowestoft, Suffolk in a leaky condition.

<--

== 21 July ==
List of shipwrecks: 21 July 1855
Ship	State	Description

-->

== 22 July ==
List of shipwrecks: 22 July 1855
Ship	State	Description
British Empire	(United Kingdom of Great Britain and Ireland) British North America	The steamship strucke a rock at Verns Point, Province of Canada and sank. All on board were rescued.
Polimince	Spain	The barque was destroyed by fire at Mahón. She was on a voyage from Havana, Cuba to Barcelona.
William Metcalfe	United Kingdom	The ship caught fire at Antwerp, Belgium and was scuttled. She was refloated the next day.

== 23 July ==
List of shipwrecks: 23 July 1855
Ship	State	Description
HMS Jasper	Royal Navy	Crimean War, Siege of Taganrog: The Dapper-class gunboat ran aground in the Sea of Azov on the coast of the Russian Empire. Under fire from Cossacks, she was scuttled and abandoned on 24 July.
Mattao	United Kingdom	The ship struck a sunken wreck off the Isles of Scilly and was damaged. She was on a voyage from Cardiff, Glamorgan to Constantinople, Ottoman Empire. She put in to Falmouth, Cornwall in a leaky condition.
Mentor	Prussia	The barque was run into by HMS Gorgon (Royal Navy) off Beachy Head, Sussex, United Kingdom and was severely damaged. She was on a voyage from Danzig to Cardiff, Glamorgan, United Kingdom. HMS Gorgon towed her in to The Downs in a waterlogged condition.
Sarah Ann	United Kingdom	The schooner was in collision with the steamship Baltic (United States) and sank. Her crew were rescued by Baltic. Sarah Ann was on a voyage from Bangor to Bristol, Gloucestershire. She was subsequently towed in to Holyhead, Anglesey by Cornucopia (United Kingdom).

== 24 July ==
List of shipwrecks: 24 July 1855
Ship	State	Description
Ameer	United Kingdom	The ship foundered in the Atlantic Ocean. Her crew survived. She was on a voyage from Quebec City, Province of Canada, British North America to Liverpool, Lancashire.
Anna Louise	Netherlands	The galiot collided with the steamship Indiana (United Kingdom) and sank in the Mediterranean Sea off Cape Bon, Beylik of Tunis. Her eight crew were rescued by Indiana. Anna Louise was on a voyage from Galaţi, Ottoman Empire to Amsterdam, North Holland.
Falcon	(United Kingdom of Great Britain and Ireland) British North America	The barque was abandoned in the Atlantic Ocean. Her fifteen crew were rescued by the barque Harlequin (United Kingdom). Falcon was on a voyage from Quebec City, Province of Canada to Portmadoc, Caernarfonshire, United Kingdom.
Powell	United Kingdom	The ship was wrecked at Cannonier's Point, Mauritius.
Sabrina	United Kingdom	The barque was driven ashore and damaged at Redcar, Yorkshire. She was on a voyage from London to Hartlepool, County Durham. She was refloated the next day and towed in to West Hartlepool in a severely leaky condition.

== 25 July ==
List of shipwrecks: 25 July 1855
Ship	State	Description
British Queen	(United Kingdom of Great Britain and Ireland) British North America	The steamship struck a rock off Deschambault, Province of Canada and sank. She had been refloated by 6 August and taken in to Quebec City, Province of Canada for repairs.
Janet and Mary	United Kingdom	The ship was discovered derelict in the North Sea. She was towed in to Scarborough, Yorkshire.
North America	(United Kingdom of Great Britain and Ireland) British North America	The steamship struck a rock off Deschambault and sank.
Portena	United States	The ship ran aground on the Roamer Bank. She was on a voyage from Rio de Janeiro, Brazil to New York.

== 26 July ==
List of shipwrecks: 26 July 1855
Ship	State	Description
Harriet	United Kingdom	The ship was driven ashore and damaged at Newhaven, Sussex.
Jeune Louise	France	The schooner caught fire in the English Channel off Dover, Kent, United Kingdom and was abandoned by her crew, who were rescued by a steamship. She was on a voyage from Rouen, Seine-Inférieure to London, United Kingdom.

== 27 July ==
List of shipwrecks: 27 July 1855
Ship	State	Description
Elizabeth	United Kingdom	The fishing smack was in collision with Edmund Graham and sank in the English Channel off Start Point, Devon with the loss of all hands.
Jane	United Kingdom	The brig was driven ashore at Redcar, Yorkshire. She was on a voyage from Stockton on Tees, County Durham to Rochester, Kent. She was refloated and sailed for Hartlepool, County Durham.
May	United Kingdom	The brig was driven ashore at Redcar. She was on a voyage from Hartlepool to London. She was refloated and sailed for Hartlepool.
Oxalis	United Kingdom	The schooner ran aground at Eyemouth, Berwickshire. She was on a voyage from Liverpool, Lancashire to Eyemouth. She was refloated the next day and found to be severely leaky.
Provestenen	Sweden	The ship struck the breakwater and was damaged at Ramsgate, Kent, United Kingdom. She was on a voyage from Gothenburg to Le Havre, Seine-Inférieure, France.

== 28 July ==
List of shipwrecks: 28 July 1855
Ship	State	Description
Frederike and Dora	Elbing	The ship was driven ashore and wrecked at Harboøre, Denmark. Her crew were rescued. She was on a voyage from Elbing to King's Lynn, Norfolk, United Kingdom.
Glendower	United Kingdom	The paddle steamer struck rocks off South Stack, Anglesey and foundered off Towyn Capel. All on board, her crew and 140 passengers, were rescued. She was on a voyage from Cornwall to Liverpool, Lancashire.

== 29 July ==
List of shipwrecks: 29 July 1855
Ship	State	Description
Flyaway	United States	The extreme clipper ran aground on a reef. She was on a voyage from Manila, Spanish East Indies to New York. She was refloated and resumed her voyage.
HMS Gleaner	Royal Navy	Crimean War: The Gleaner-class gunboat ran aground 4 nautical miles (7.4 km) off "Borko Island", Grand Duchy of Finland before 29 July. She was refloated with the assistance of a French Navy gunboat.
Horsburgh	United Kingdom	The barque was driven ashore and wrecked at Playa Ancha, Valparaíso, Chile. Her crew were rescued. She was on a voyage from Huasco to Valparaíso.

== 30 July ==
List of shipwrecks: 30 July 1855
Ship	State	Description
Olive Leaf	United Kingdom	The ship was driven ashore near the Flamborough Head Lighthouse, Yorkshire. She was on a voyage from Hartlepool, County Durham to Whitstable, Kent.

== 31 July ==
List of shipwrecks: 31 July 1855
Ship	State	Description
Margaret and Grizzel	United Kingdom	The ship caught fire in Inverkip Bay due to her cargo of quicklime getting wet. She was scuttled.
Prince	United Kingdom	The brig was destroyed by fire 1,050 nautical miles (1,940 km) off the Cape of Good Hope, Cape Colony. All on board were rescued by Marathon (United Kingdom).
Royal Charter	United Kingdom	The steamship sank in the River Dee on being launched. She was refloated on 28 August.

== Unknown date ==
List of shipwrecks: Unknown date in July 1855
Ship	State	Description
Baltic	United Kingdom	The steamship was driven ashore at Flamborough Head, Yorkshire. She was refloated on 9 July and sailed for the Humber.
Futtal Wahab	United Kingdom	The schooner was wrecked on a rock off "Relliton". Her crew were murdered by the local inhabitants. She was on a voyage from Bali, Netherlands East Indies to Singapore, Straits Settlements.
Iron Gun	United Kingdom	The ship was driven ashore at Grimsby, Lincolnshire. She was refloated on 29 July.
James Caskie	United States	The brig ran aground on the Goodwin Sands, Kent, United Kingdom. She was refloated on 14 July and taken in to The Downs.
James Paton	United Kingdom	The ship was driven ashore on Rathlin Island, County Donegal before 7 July. She was on a voyage from the Clyde to Melbourne, Victoria. She was refloated and taken in to Troon, Ayrshire for repairs.
Jennet and Mary	United Kingdom	The ship was abandoned in the North Sea before 16 July.
Lady Elgin	United Kingdom	The ship ran aground in the Moulmein River. She was on a voyage from Moulmein, Burma to Queenstown, County Cork. She was refloated and put in to Penang, Malaya in a leaky condition before 20 July.
Ottawa	(United Kingdom of Great Britain and Ireland) British North America	The steamship was in collision with Tibbits (Flag unknown) and sank in the Strait of Belle Isle. All on board were rescued. She was on a voyage from Quebec City to Liverpool, Lancashire.
HMS Spiteful	Royal Navy	Crimean War: The Driver-class sloop ran aground at the mouth of the Danube. An offer to surrender the ship to the Russians was refused and she was later refloated.
Vrouw Margrieta	Netherlands	The ship was wrecked on the Swedish coast before 7 July. She was on a voyage from Memel, Prussia to an English port.
