= Gleaner-class gunboat =

Class overview
- Name: Gleaner class
- Operators: Royal Navy
- Succeeded by: Dapper class
- Built: 1854
- In commission: 1854 – 1864
- Completed: 6

General characteristics
- Type: 'Crimean' gunboat
- Tons burthen: 215 53/94 tons bm
- Length: 100 ft (30 m) (gundeck); 86 ft 4 in (26.31 m) (keel)
- Beam: 22 ft 0 in (6.71 m)
- Draught: 7 ft 10 in (2.39 m)
- Installed power: 60 nominal horsepower; 270 ihp (200 kW))
- Propulsion: 2-cylinder horizontal single expansion steam engine; Single screw
- Speed: 7.5 kn (13.9 km/h)
- Crew: 36
- Armament: 1 × 68-pounder smoothbore muzzle-loading gun; 1 × 32-pounder SBML gun; 2 × 24-pounder howitzers

The Gleaner (or Pelter)-class gunboat was a class of six gunboats built for the Royal Navy in 1854 for use in the Crimean War.

== Design ==
The Gleaner class was designed by W.H. Walker (who also designed the subsequent Dapper and Albacore classes). The ships were wooden-hulled, with steam power as well as sails, but of shallow draught for coastal bombardment in the shallow waters of the Baltic and Black Sea during the Crimean War.

=== Propulsion ===
Two-cylinder horizontal single-expansion steam engines built by John Penn and Sons, with two boilers, provided 60 nominal horsepower through a single screw, sufficient for 7.5 knots (13.9 km/h; 8.6 mph).

=== Armament ===
Ships of the class were armed with one 68-pounder smooth bore muzzle loading cannon (SBML), one 32-pounder SBML (originally two 68-pounder SBMLs were planned but the forward gun was substituted by a 32-pounder) and two 24-pounder howitzers.

== Ships ==
Name	Ship builder	Launched	Fate
Pelter	W & H Pitcher, Northfleet	28 August 1854	Sold for breaking January 1864, breaking up completed by Tolpult on 1 February 1864
Pincher	W & H Pitcher, Northfleet	5 September 1854	Breaking completed on 17 February 1864
Badger	W & H Pitcher, Northfleet	23 September 1854	Broken up at Portsmouth in June 1864
Snapper	W & H Pitcher, Northfleet	4 October 1854	Became a coal hulk in 1865, sold in 1906
Gleaner	Deptford Dockyard	7 October 1854	Sold at Montevideo in April 1868
Ruby	Deptford Dockyard	7 October 1854	Broken up October 1868
