= HMS Grinder (1855) =

Gunboat of the Royal Navy

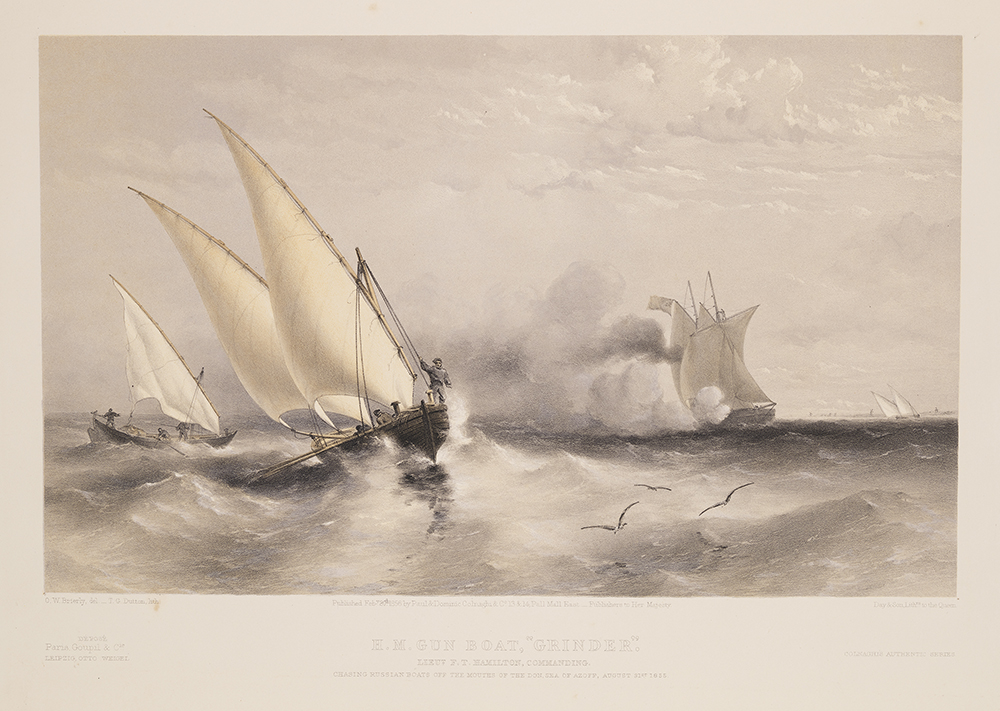
- The gunvessel Grinder chasing Russian boats in the Sea of Azov, 31 August 1855

History

United Kingdom
- Name: HMS Grinder
- Ordered: 6 October 1854
- Builder: J & R White, West Cowes
- Cost: Hull £4,084, machinery £3,567 (Note: A total cost accounting for inflation of approximately £989,200 in today's money.)
- Laid down: 13 October 1854
- Launched: 7 March 1855
- Commissioned: 17 May 1855
- Fate: Broken up at Haslar, July 1864

General characteristics
- Class & type: Dapper-class gunboat
- Displacement: 284 tons
- Tons burthen: 232 68/94 bm
- Length: 106 ft 0 in (32.3 m) (gundeck); 93 ft 2 1/2 in (28.4 m) (keel)
- Beam: 22 ft 0 in (6.7 m)
- Draught: 6 ft 0 3/4 in (1.8 m)
- Depth of hold: 8 ft 0 in (2.4 m)
- Installed power: 60 nominal horsepower; 270 ihp (200 kW)
- Propulsion: 2-cylinder horizontal direct-acting single-expansion steam engine; 3 × cylindrical boilers; Single (non-hoisting) screw
- Sail plan: Schooner (or "gunboat") rig
- Speed: 7 1/2 kn (13.9 km/h; 8.6 mph)
- Complement: 36
- Armament: 1 × 8-inch (200 mm) 68-pounder (95cwt) muzzle-loading smoothbore gun; 1 × 32-pounder muzzle-loading smoothbore gun (Note: The-32 pounder was mounted in place of a second planned 68-pounder); 2 × 24-pounder howitzers

HMS Grinder was a wooden 3-gun Dapper-class gunboat, launched on 7 March 1855. Although she served for nine years, her most active period was in her first year when she served in the Crimean War.

== Black Sea and Sea of Azov ==
During the summer of 1855, Grinder carried out raids on Russian food and ammunition stores to prevent supplies reaching the Russian troops in the Crimea. Grinder and nine other gunboats (Beagle, Boxer, Cracker, Curlew, Fancy, Jasper, Vesuvius, Swallow and Wrangler ) were employed destroying fisheries and corn stores, as well as ammunition stores, around the Sea of Azov. Their raids forced the Russian land forces to maintain a state of constant readiness lest there be a landing.

The British naval squadron, including Grinder, was active on 23 September 1855 at the entrance to the Sea of Azov in destroying communications between Temryuk and Taman, an area of shallow seas, swamps and bridges.

For some of this summer period, Grinder, under the command of Lieutenant Francis Trevor Hamilton, served as a tender to the first rate Royal Albert, flagship of Rear Admiral Sir Edmund Lyons, Bart GCB.

From July 1855 she was commanded by Lieutenant Burgoyne. Grinder played her small part in the actions against the fort at the head of Dnieper Bay as part in a joint force of British and French warships, including the steam frigate Valourous, Gladiator and Clinker, on 18 October 1855.

Further activities of the squadron, including Grinder, consisted of destroying vast quantities of provisions and fuel near the town of Yeisk in the Sea of Azov on 3 November 1855, just as the weather was changing to make naval activities there impossible. The attacks were on such a broad front that even the presence of 1500 cossacks in the area did not inconvenience the landing parties.

== Fate ==
Grinder was decommissioned in 1864, and broken up at Portsmouth.
