= HMS Surly (1856) =

British Royal Navy mortar vessel

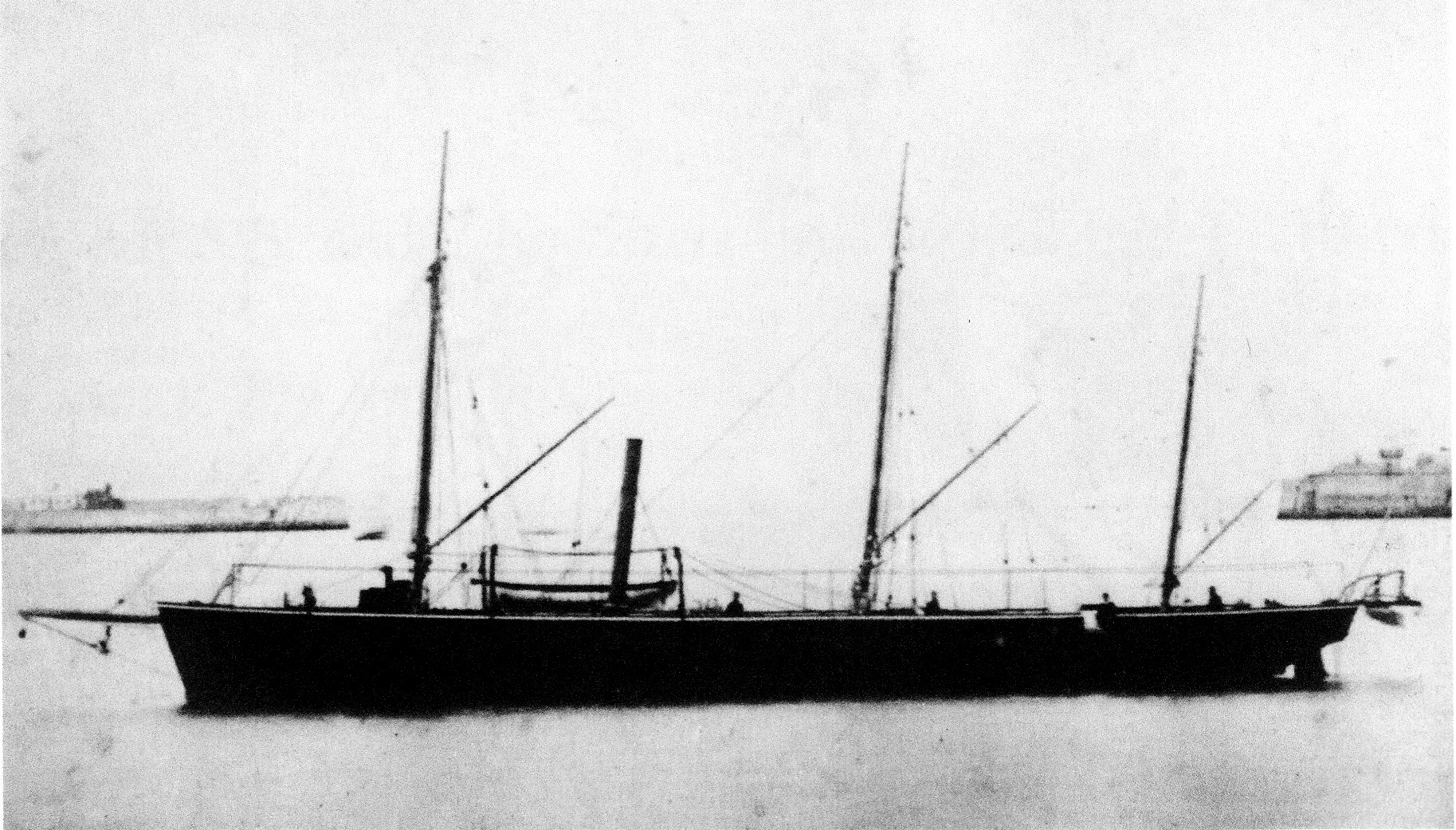
- Surly's sister ship Raven, built to the same design

History

United Kingdom
- Name: HMS Surly
- Ordered: 4 October 1855
- Builder: T & W Smith, Newcastle
- Laid down: 15 October 1855
- Launched: 18 March 1856
- Commissioned: 5 July 1856
- Fate: Sold at auction 21 October 1869

General characteristics
- Displacement: 284 tons
- Tons burthen: 23268/94 (bm)
- Length: 106 feet (32 m) (gundeck); 93 feet 2 1/2 inches (28.410 m) (keel)
- Beam: 22 feet (6.7 m)
- Draught: 6 feet 6 inches (1.98 m)
- Depth of hold: 8 feet (2.4 m)
- Propulsion: 3 cylindrical boilers; Horizontal single expansion direct acting 217 indicated horsepower (162 kW) engine; Single screw
- Sail plan: Three masts
- Speed: 7.5 knots (14 km/h)
- Complement: 36-40 men
- Armament: 68-pounder gun mounted aft; 32-pounder gun mounted forward; 2 × 24-pounder howitzers mounted on broadsides

HMS Surly was an Albacore-class gunboat built for the Royal Navy. She was constructed in Newcastle by T & W Smith as part of the second batch, ordered in early October 1855, and was launched on 18 March 1856. After commissioning she served in the Steam Reserve and Coastguard Reserve. She was sold out of service in 1869.

== Description ==
The order for Surly was placed with T & W Smith on 4 October and her keel was laid in Newcastle on 15 October.

Surly was fitted with three cylindrical boilers and a horizontal single expansion direct acting 217 indicated horsepower (162 kW) engine supplied by Maudslay, Sons & Field. Fitted with sails as well as her single screw, she was capable of 7.5 knots (14 km/h) and could carry 25 long tons (25 t) of coal for fuel. The vessel was launched on schedule on 18 March 1856, and commissioned into the Royal Navy on 5 July, having cost £9,867, of which the hull accounted for £5,656 and machinery £3,298.

The Albacore-class were armed with a single muzzle-loaded smoothbore 68-pounder gun (95 cwt; barrel length 10 feet) mounted on a pivot at aft, and a muzzle-loaded smoothbore 32-pounder gun (56 cwt; barrel length 9.5 feet) at the ships' forward. They were also fitted with two 24-pounder howitzers on broadside gun carriages. The Albacore-class carried a crew of 36-40 men.

== Service ==
Upon commissioning Surly went straight into the Royal Navy's Steam Reserve at Sheerness Dockyard. In April 1861 she was serving with the Coastguard Reserve at Hull as tender to HMS Cornwallis and later HMS Dauntless. In Royal Navy service Surly's signal letters were GTWB. Surly was paid off in April 1869 and sold out of service at public auction on 21 October 1869, making £1,025.
