= Dapper-class gunboat =

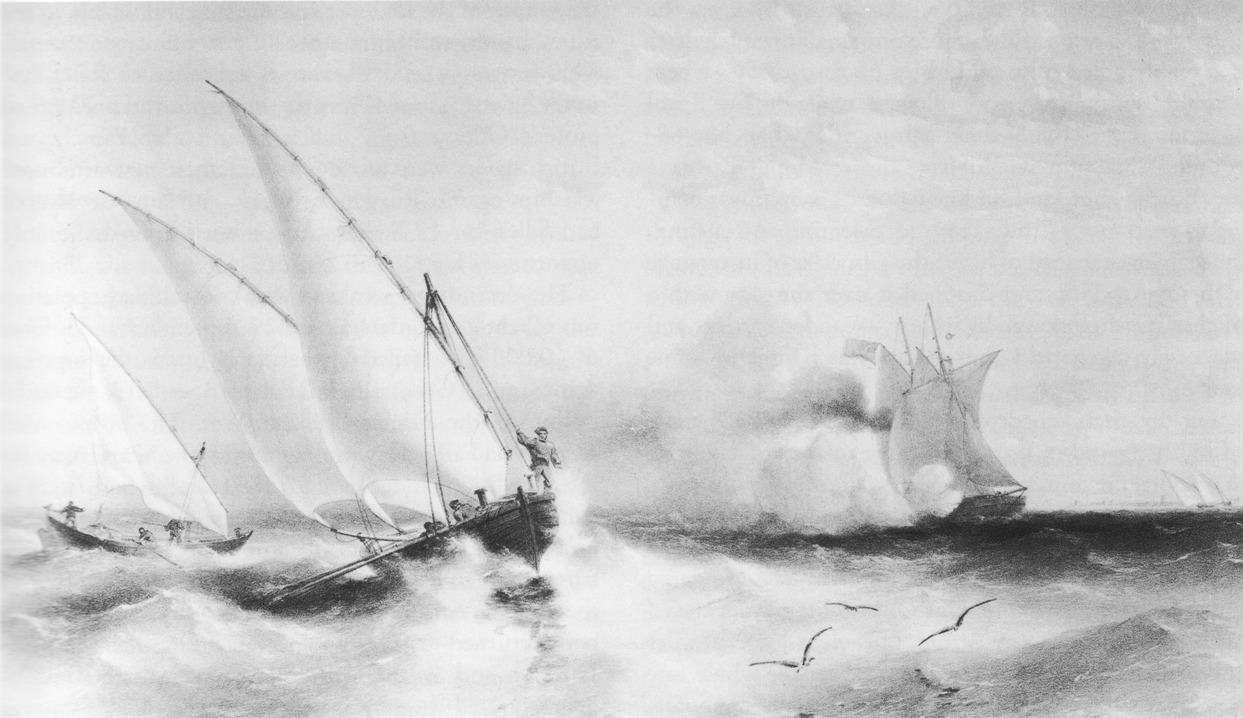
- The gunvessel Grinder chasing Russian boats in the Sea of Azov, 31 August 1855

Class overview
- Name: Dapper class
- Operators: Royal Navy
- Preceded by: Gleaner class
- Succeeded by: Albacore class
- Built: 1854–1855
- In commission: 1855–1906
- Completed: 20

General characteristics
- Type: 'Crimean' gunboat
- Tons burthen: 215 53/94 tons bm
- Length: 106 ft (32 m) (gundeck); 93 ft 2.5 in (28.410 m) (keel)
- Beam: 22 ft 0 in (6.71 m)
- Draught: 6 ft 9 in (2.06 m)
- Installed power: 60 nominal horsepower; 270 ihp (200 kW))
- Propulsion: 2-cylinder horizontal single expansion steam engine; Single screw
- Speed: 7.5 kn (13.9 km/h)
- Crew: 36
- Armament: 1 × 68-pounder SBML gun; 1 × 32-pounder SBML gun; 2 × 24-pounder howitzers

The Dapper-class gunboat was a class of twenty gunboats built for the Royal Navy in 1854–55 for use in the Crimean War.

== Design ==
The Dapper class was designed by W.H. Walker (who also designed the preceding Gleaner class and the subsequent Albacore class). The ships were wooden-hulled, with steam power as well as sails, but of shallow draft for coastal bombardment in the shallow waters of the Baltic and Black Sea during the Crimean War.

=== Propulsion ===
Ten ships had two-cylinder horizontal single-expansion trunk steam engines built by John Penn and Sons, with two boilers. The other ten had two-cylinder horizontal single-expansion direct-acting steam engines built by Maudslay, Sons and Field, with three boilers. Both versions provided 60 nominal horsepower through a single screw, sufficient for 7.5 knots (13.9 km/h; 8.6 mph).

=== Armament ===
Ships of the class were armed with one 68-pounder smooth bore muzzle loading cannon (SBML), one 32-pounder SBML (originally two 68-pounder SBMLs were planned but the forward gun was substituted by a 32-pounder) and two 24-pounder howitzers.

== Ships ==
Name	Ship builder	Engine builder	Launched	Fate
Lark	Deptford Dockyard	Maudslay	15 March 1855	Sold to Marshall for breaking at Plymouth on 18 July 1878
Magpie	Deptford Dockyard	Maudslay	15 March 1855	Wrecked in Galway Bay on 8 April 1864
Dapper	R & H Green, Blackwall Yard	Penn	31 March 1855	Training hulk 1885, cooking depot 1897, renamed YC37 in 1909, sold to Perry 10 May 1922
Fancy	R & H Green, Blackwall Yard	Penn	31 March 1855	Hulked as part of the St Vincent training establishment in 1876, being used as a laundry/drying room. Sold at Portsmouth on 11 July 1905
Grinder	J & R White, West Cowes	Maudslay	7 March 1855	Broken up at Haslar on 15 July 1864
Jasper	J & R White, West Cowes	Maudslay	2 April 1855	Grounded in action at the Siege of Taganrog on 23 July 1855
Hind	John Jenkins Thompson, Rotherhithe	Maudslay	3 May 1855	Broken up at Devonport in October 1872
Jackdaw	John Jenkins Thompson, Rotherhithe	Maudslay	18 May 1855	Became a cooking depot in 1868 and sold to C Wort in November 1888
Thistle	W & H Pitcher, Northfleet	Penn	3 February 1855	Completed breaking at Deptford on 11 November 1863
Starling	W & H Pitcher, Northfleet	Penn	1 February 1855	Sold at Hong Kong on 1 December 1871
Snap	W & H Pitcher, Northfleet	Penn	3 February 1855	Sold at Hong Kong in 1868 and then resold to the Japanese as the warship Kaku-ten-shan, then became Snap again in 1872 as a merchantman
Redwing	W & H Pitcher, Northfleet	Maudslay	19 March 1855	Became tender to the training ship Cambridge at Devonport in 1857, sold on 2 December 1878
Weazel	W & H Pitcher, Northfleet	Penn	19 March 1855	Sold at Hong Kong on 18 November 1869
Clinker	W & H Pitcher, Northfleet	Penn	2 April 1855	Sold to Castle for breaking at Charlton on 6 June 1871
Cracker	W & H Pitcher, Northfleet	Maudslay	2 April 1855	Broken up in April 1864
Boxer	W & H Pitcher, Northfleet	Penn	7 April 1855	Broken up at Malta in October 1865
Stork	W & H Pitcher, Northfleet	Maudslay	7 April 1855	Coal hulk in 1874, sold for breaking April 1884
Skylark	W & H Pitcher, Northfleet	Penn	3 May 1855	Gunnery tender in 1884, sold to Garnham for breaking on 10 July 1906
Biter	W & H Pitcher, Northfleet	Penn	5 May 1855	Became a coal hulk on 21 April 1865, later renamed C16. Sold to Castle, Woolwich for breaking on 12 April 1904
Swinger	W & H Pitcher, Northfleet	Maudslay	10 May 1855	Broken up on 6 September 1864
