= HMS Sepoy (1856) =

Gunboat of the Royal Navy

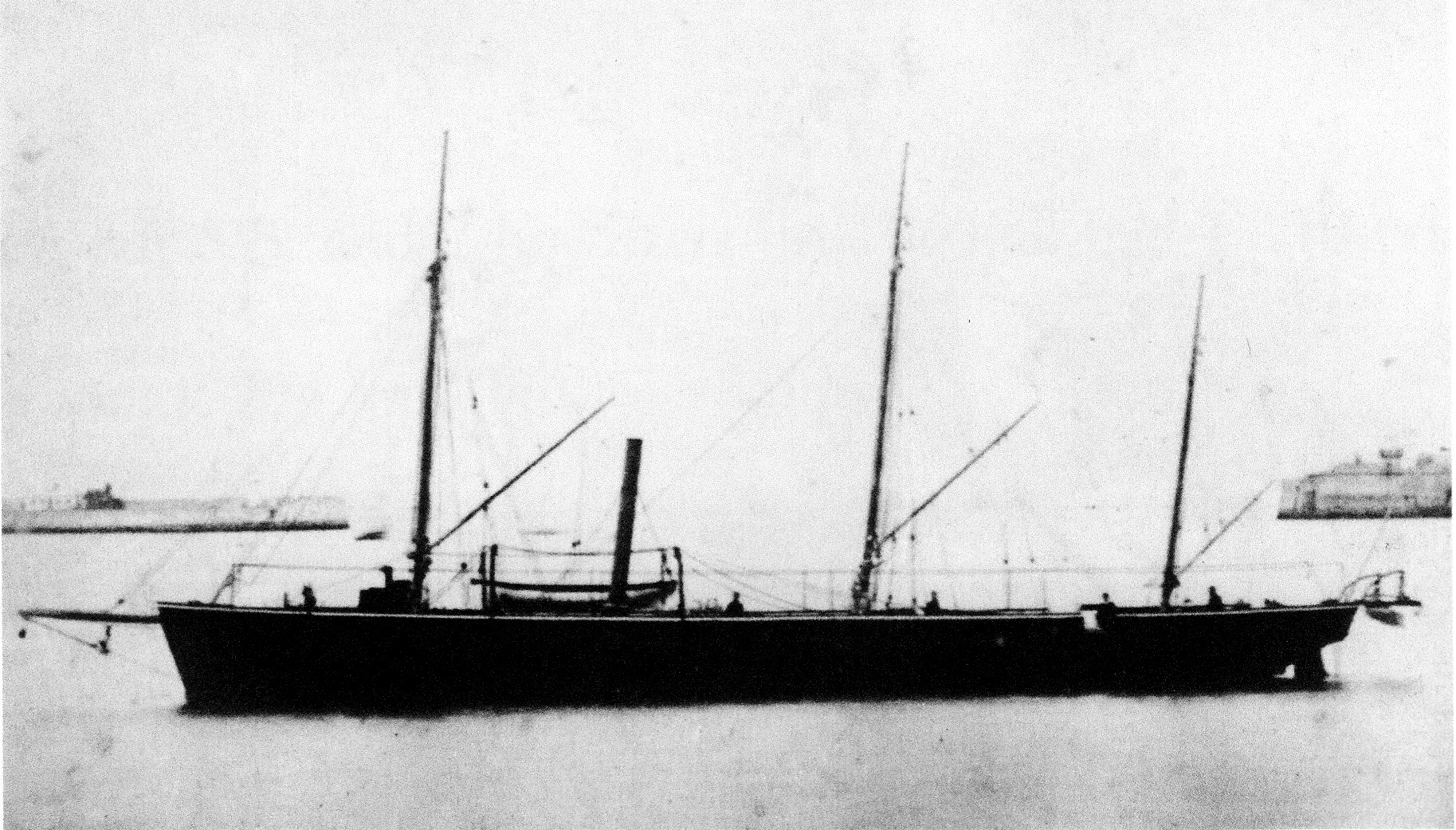
- Sepoy's sister ship, Raven

History

United Kingdom
- Name: HMS Sepoy
- Ordered: 4 October 1855
- Builder: T & W Smith, North Shields
- Cost: £10,725
- Laid down: 8 October 1855
- Launched: 13 February 1856
- Commissioned: 5 April 1856
- Fate: Broken up 1868

General characteristics
- Class & type: Albacore-class gunboat of 1855
- Displacement: 284 tons
- Tons burthen: 232 68/94 bm
- Length: 106 ft (32 m) (gundeck); 93 ft 2 1/2 in (28.410 m) (keel)
- Beam: 22 ft 0 in (6.7 m)
- Draught: 6 ft 6 in (2.0 m)
- Depth of hold: 8 ft (2.4 m)
- Installed power: 60 nominal horsepower; 217 ihp (162 kW)
- Propulsion: Horizontal single-expansion, direct-acting steam engine; Three cylindrical boilers; Single screw
- Speed: 7 1/2 kn (13.9 km/h)
- Complement: 36 - 40
- Armament: 1 × 68-pounder 95 cwt muzzle-loading smooth-bore gun aft; 1 × 32-pounder muzzle-loading smooth-bore gun fwd; 2 × 24-pounder howitzers on broadside trucks

HMS Sepoy was a 4-gun Albacore-class gunboat of the Royal Navy launched in 1856 and broken up in 1868.

== Construction ==
The Albacore class was ordered to meet the sudden need for shallow-draft vessels in the Black Sea and Baltic Sea during the Crimean War. Many of them were built of unseasoned timber, and their lives were consequently short. Sepoy was launched on 13 February 1856 at the North Shields yard of T & W Smith, and commissioned seven weeks later under Lieutenant-in-command Henry Needham Knox.

== Career ==
According to The Times of 12 March 1856, the gunboats Sepoy and Erne left the Tyne in tow of the Cock-o'-the-North, for Woolwich. She was present at the Fleet Review, Spithead on 23 April the same year, as part of the White Squadron, and paid off at Sheerness on 28 May 1856.

In company with HM gunboats Bullfrog, Carnation and Spanker, from the 1st Division of Steam Reserve at Sheerness, she went to Gravesend on 5 March 1863 to take on board the RN Volunteers of the London division. They were embarked to fire a Royal salute on the arrival of the Princess Alexandra.

On 10 October 1865, Sepoy was driven ashore and severely damaged at the mouth of the River Tweed.

== Disposal ==
Sepoy was broken up in 1868.
