= Albacore-class gunboat (1855) =

British Royal Navy gunboat class

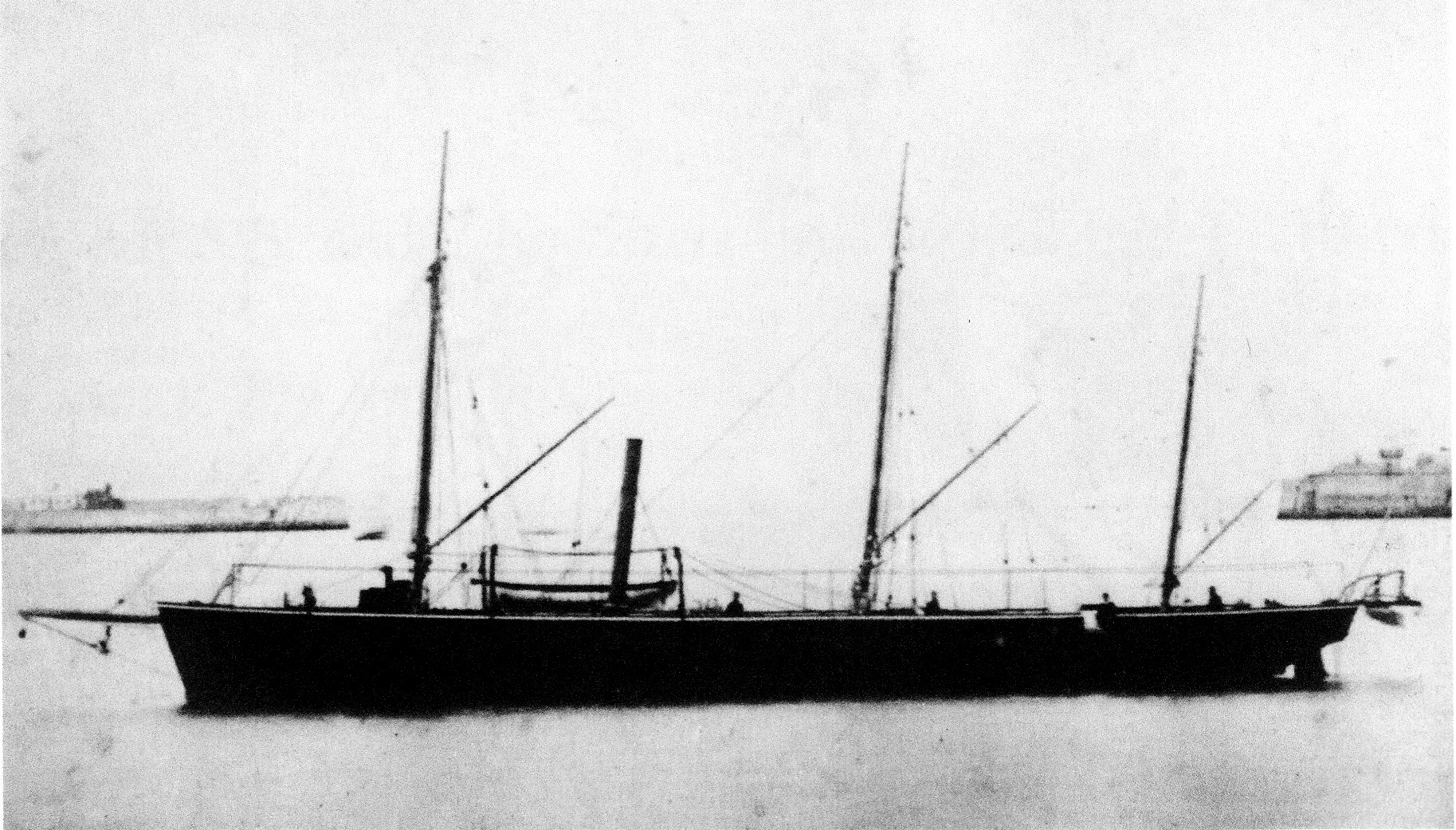
- HMS Raven, one of the Albacore class, in Kingstown Harbour, Dublin

Class overview
- Name: Albacore class (1855)
- Operators: Royal Navy
- Preceded by: Dapper class
- Succeeded by: Cheerful class
- Built: 1855–56
- In commission: 1855 – 1881
- Completed: 98

General characteristics
- Type: 'Crimean' gunboat
- Tons burthen: 232 68/94 tons bm
- Length: 106 ft (32 m) (gundeck); 93 ft 2.5 in (28.410 m) (keel)
- Beam: 22 ft 0 in (6.71 m)
- Draught: 6 ft 6 in (1.98 m)
- Installed power: 60 nominal horsepower; 270 ihp (200 kW))
- Propulsion: 2-cylinder horizontal single expansion steam engine; Single screw
- Speed: 7.5 kn (13.9 km/h)
- Crew: 36–40
- Armament: 1 × 68-pounder (95cwt) MLSB gun; 1 × 32-pounder MLSB gun; 2 × 24-pounder howitzers

The Albacore-class gunboat, also known as "Crimean gunboat", was a class of 98 gunboats built for the Royal Navy in 1855 and 1856 for use in the 1853-1856 Crimean War. The design of the class, by W. H. Walker, was approved on 18 April 1855. The first vessels were ordered the same day, and 48 were on order by July; a second batch, which included Surly, were ordered in early October.

== Design ==
The Albacore class was almost identical to the preceding Dapper class, also designed by W.H. Walker. The ships were wooden-hulled, with both steam power and sails, and of shallow draught for coastal bombardment in the shallow waters of the Baltic and Black Seas during the Crimean War.

The Albacore-class vessels measured 106 feet (32 m) in length at the gundeck and 93 feet 2 1/2 inches (28.410 m) at the keel. They were 22 feet (6.7 m) in beam, 8 feet (2.4 m) deep in the hold and had a draught of 6 feet 6 inches (1.98 m). Their displacement was 284 tons and they measured 23268/94 tons Builder's Old Measurement. The Albacore-class carried a crew of 36-40 men.

One of the vessels of the class, HMS Surly, cost £9,867, of which the hull accounted for £5,656 and machinery £3,298.

=== Propulsion ===
Half of the ships had two-cylinder horizontal single-expansion trunk steam engines, built by John Penn and Sons, with two boilers. The other half had two-cylinder horizontal single-expansion direct-acting steam engines, built by Maudslay, Sons and Field, with three boilers. Both versions provided 60 nominal horsepower through a single screw, sufficient for 7.5 knots (13.9 km/h; 8.6 mph).

=== Armament ===
Ships of the class were armed with one 68-pounder (95 cwt) muzzle-loading smoothbore gun, one 32-pounder muzzle-loading smoothbore gun (originally two 68-pounders were planned but the forward gun was substituted by a 32-pounder) and two 24-pounder howitzers.

== Ships ==
Name	Ship builder	Launched	Fate
Beaver	Money Wigram & Sons, Northam	28 November 1855	This vessel was built hastily of unseasoned wood with the result that she was unsound and saw no service at all. Broken up at Portsmouth in 1864.
Whiting	Money Wigram & Sons, Northam	9 January 1856	Broken up in December 1881
Nightingale	C J Mare & Company, Leamouth	22 December 1855	Sold to W Lethbridge for breaking on 16 July 1867
Violet	C J Mare & Company, Leamouth	9 January 1856	Sold to Marshall for breaking at Plymouth on 7 October 1864
Seagull	W & H Pitcher, Northfleet	4 June 1855	Sold to Marshall for breaking at Plymouth on 7 October 1864
Skipjack	W & H Pitcher, Northfleet	4 August 1855	Boilers removed in 1862, became a cooking depot in 1874. Breaking at Devonport completed on 4 February 1879
Sandfly	W & H Pitcher, Northfleet	1 September 1855	Sold to W Lethbridge for breaking on 5 November 1867
Sheldrake	W & H Pitcher, Northfleet	1 September 1855	Sold at Montevideo on 30 June 1865
Plover	W & H Pitcher, Northfleet	8 September 1855	Sunk in action with the Taku forts in the Hai River on 26 June 1859
Tickler	W & H Pitcher, Northfleet	8 September 1855	Breaking at Deptford completed on 21 November 1863
Banterer	W & H Pitcher, Northfleet	29 September 1855	Grounded in action with the Taku forts in the Hai River on 25 June 1859, but refloated and sold at Hong Kong on 30 December 1872
Bullfrog	W & H Pitcher, Northfleet	6 October 1855	Broken up at Sheerness on 8 June 1875
Bustard	W & H Pitcher, Northfleet	20 October 1855	Fitted for foreign service in 1856. Sold to Cheeong Loong at Hong Kong on 18 November 1869
Carnation	W & H Pitcher, Northfleet	20 October 1855	Broken up at Sheerness in 1863
Charger	W & H Pitcher, Northfleet	13 November 1855	Became a buoy boat at Halifax in June 1866. Later renamed YC3 on 24 June 1866, then YC6 in 1869. Sold in July 1887 as merchant vessel SS Rescue. Broken up in 1921
Cockchafer	W & H Pitcher, Northfleet	24 November 1855	Fitted for service in China in 1859. Sold to Telge Northing Company at Shanghai in 1872
Dove	W & H Pitcher, Northfleet	24 November 1855	Sold to the P&O Company at Shanghai on 14 April 1873
Forward	W & H Pitcher, Northfleet	8 December 1855	Fitted for service in British Columbia in 1859. Sold to Hill & Ready, Esquimault
Grasshopper	W & H Pitcher, Northfleet	12 January 1856	Sold at Newchang in May 1871
Hasty	W & H Pitcher, Northfleet	10 January 1856	Sold to Castle for breaking at Charlton in November 1865
Herring	W & H Pitcher, Northfleet	10 January 1856	Broken up at Sheerness in August 1865
Insolent	W & H Pitcher, Northfleet	26 January 1856	Lent to the Board of Works for the Maintenance of Lighthouses in 1856 - later returned. Sold at Chefoo in China on 1 May 1869
Mayflower	W & H Pitcher, Northfleet	31 January 1856	Became tender to HMS President in 1862. Broken up at Sheerness in the summer of 1867
Staunch	W & H Pitcher, Northfleet	31 January 1856	Fitted for foreign service in September 1856. Between 30 July 1862 and 3 August 1862 she stuck on a rock at Canton but managed to get off. Sold at Hong Kong in December 1866 and broken up
Goldfinch	Money Wigram & Sons, Northam	2 February 1856	Broken up at Pembroke on 22 June 1869
Goshawk	Money Wigram & Sons, Northam	9 February 1856	Broken up at Devonport on 18 March 1869
Julia	Fletcher & Fearnall, Limehouse	27 November 1855	Broken up by Marshall at Plymouth in February 1866
Louisa	Fletcher & Fearnall, Limehouse	December 1855	Sold to W Lethbridge for breaking on 27 August 1867
Bouncer	C J Mare & Company, Leamouth	23 February 1856	Sold at Hong Kong on 1 February 1871
Hyena	C J Mare & Company, Leamouth	3 April 1856	Sold to W E Joliffe as a salvage vessel on 8 March 1870. Broken up in 1894
Savage	C J Mare & Company, Leamouth	5 May 1856	Became mooring lighter YC3 in 1864. Broken up at Malta in September 1888
Wolf	C J Mare & Company, Leamouth	5 July 1856	Completed breaking on 8 July 1864
Griper	R & H Green, Blackwall Yard	11 December 1855	Became tender to a Coast Guard ship in 1861 and was fitted for Armstrong guns in 1862. Broken up at Devonport on 18 March 1869
Fervent	R & H Green, Blackwall Yard	23 January 1856	Broken up at Devonport in February 1879
Forester	R & H Green, Blackwall Yard	23 January 1856	Became yard craft YC7 at Hong Kong in 1868 and was lost in a typhoon at Hong Kong on 2 September 1871
Spanker	R & H Green, Blackwall Yard	22 March 1856	Broken up at Chatham in August 1874
Traveller	R & H Green, Blackwall Yard	13 March 1856	Fitted for Armstrong guns in 1861. Completed breaking at Portsmouth on 28 December 1863
Thrasher	R & H Green, Blackwall Yard	22 March 1856	Sold by order dated 9 May 1883
Opossum	Money Wigram & Sons, Northam	26 February 1856	Became a hospital hulk in 1876, then a mooring vessel in 1891. Renamed Siren in 1895 and sold at Hong Kong in 1896
Partridge	Money Wigram & Sons, Northam	29 March 1856	Fitted for reserve, commissioned in 1859 as tender to HMS Royal Albert. Sold to Messrs. Habgood for breaking on 8 September 1864
Charon	W & H Pitcher, Northfleet	9 February 1856	Broken up by Marshall at Plymouth in October 1865
Haughty	W & H Pitcher, Northfleet	9 February 1856	Sold at Hong Kong on 23 May 1867
Leveret	W & H Pitcher, Northfleet	8 March 1856	Broken up at Portsmouth in October 1867
Mackerel	W & H Pitcher, Northfleet	8 March 1856	Breaking completed at Portsmouth on 18 July 1862
Procris	W & H Pitcher, Northfleet	13 March 1856	Cooking depot ship at Devonport on 30 June 1869. Sold to T Hockling on 31 May 1893 and broken up at Stonehouse
Shamrock	W & H Pitcher, Northfleet	13 March 1856	Sold to Marshall for breaking at Plymouth in April 1867
Spey	W & H Pitcher, Northfleet	29 March 1856	Broken up at Deptford in December 1863
Tilbury	W & H Pitcher, Northfleet	29 March 1856	Broken up by Marshall at Plymouth on 2 August 1865
Peacock	W & H Pitcher, Northfleet	12 April 1856	Broken up at Portsmouth on 25 March 1869
Pheasant	W & H Pitcher, Northfleet	1 May 1856	Broken up completed at Sheerness on 31 August 1877
Primrose	W & H Pitcher, Northfleet	3 May 1856	Broken up completed on 25 May 1864
Pickle	W & H Pitcher, Northfleet	3 May 1856	Broken up completed on 12 April 1864
Prompt	W & H Pitcher, Northfleet	21 May 1856	Broken up completed on 6 May 1864
Porpoise	W & H Pitcher, Northfleet	7 June 1856	Broken up completed on 22 February 1864
Firm	Fletcher & Fearnall, Limehouse	22 March 1856	Sold at Shanghai in 1872
Flamer	Fletcher & Fearnall, Limehouse	10 April 1856	Coastal defence in 1868. Hospital ship 1871. Blown ashore during a typhoon at Hong Kong on 22 September 1871 and the wreck then sold
Fly	Fletcher & Fearnall, Limehouse	5 April 1856	Broken up in 1862
Sepoy	T & Wm Smith, North Shields	13 February 1856	Fitted for Armstrong guns in 1861 and broken up in April 1868
Erne	T & Wm Smith, North Shields	18 February 1856	Broken up at Chatham in 1874
Spider	T & Wm Smith, North Shields	23 February 1856	Fitted for Armstrong guns in 1861. Sold to Castle for breaking at Charlton on 12 May 1870
Lively	T & Wm Smith, North Shields	23 February 1856	Wrecked on the Dutch coast on 23 December 1863, later salved and became the German mail steamer Heligolanderin
Surly	T & Wm Smith, North Shields	18 March 1856	Became a tender to the Coast Guard in 1861. Sold to Thomas J Begbie in 1869
Swan	T & Wm Smith, North Shields	12 April 1856	Became a coal hulk in 1869. Sold in 1906
Delight	Wigram & Sons, Blackwall Yard	15 March 1856	Sold at Halifax as merchantman M A Starr in November 1867
Grappler	Wigram & Sons, Blackwall Yard	29 March 1856	Fitted for service in British Columbia in 1859. Sold as a merchant vessel at Esquimault on 6 January 1868. Burnt on 3 May 1883. Broken up in 1884
Growler	Wigram & Sons, Blackwall Yard	8 May 1856	Broken up at Malta in August 1864
Parthian	Wigram & Sons, Blackwall Yard	8 May 1856	Breaking completed on 14 September 1864
Quail	Wigram & Sons, Blackwall Yard	2 June 1856	Broken up at Malta in September 1861
Ripple	Wigram & Sons, Blackwall Yard	2 June 1856	Broken up by Marshall at Plymouth April 1866
Cochin	R & H Green, Blackwall Yard	8 April 1856	Broken up at Sheerness in March 1863
Cherokee	R & H Green, Blackwall Yard	30 April 1856	Broken up at Portsmouth on 25 March 1869
Camel	R & H Green, Blackwall Yard	3 May 1856	Broken up on 30 June 1864
Caroline	R & H Green, Blackwall Yard	9 May 1856	Broken up at Portsmouth on 19 February 1862
Confounder	R & H Green, Blackwall Yard	21 May 1856	Broken up on 4 October 1864
Crocus	R & H Green, Blackwall Yard	4 June 1856	Broken up on 27 July 1864
Beacon	John Laird, Sons & Company, Dingle	11 February 1856	Broken up on 27 August 1864
Brave	John Laird, Sons & Company, Dingle	11 February 1856	Laid up after completion at Haslar. Broken up at Portsmouth on 25 March 1869
Bullfinch	John Laird, Sons & Company, Dingle	25 February 1856	Broken up in August 1864
Redbreast	John Laird, Sons & Company, Dingle	11 March 1856	Breaking completed on 24 September 1864
Rose	John Laird, Sons & Company, Dingle	21 April 1856	Fitted for Armstrong guns in 1862. Broken up at Devonport in August 1868
Blazer	John Laird, Sons & Company, Dingle	23 February 1856	Became dredger YC29 in June 1868, later YC4 at Gibraltar. Sold at Gibraltar on 4 May 1877
Rainbow	John Laird, Sons & Company, Dingle	8 March 1856	Survey ship in 1857. RNVR training ship in 1873. Sold to Castle for breaking at Charlton in November 1888
Brazen	John Laird, Sons & Company, Dingle	23 February 1856	Broken up in August 1864
Raven	John Laird, Sons & Company, Dingle	8 March 1856	Sold to Castle for breaking at Charlton on 13 April 1875
Rocket	John Laird, Sons & Company, Dingle	21 April 1856	Broken up in October 1864
Hardy	Charles Hill & Sons, Bristol	1 March 1856	Sold at Hong Kong on 9 February 1869
Havock	Charles Hill & Sons, Bristol	20 March 1856	Sold at Yokohama on 31 March 1870
Highlander	Charles Hill & Sons, Bristol	29 April 1856	Became dredger YC 51 in 1868. Sold in May 1884.
Albacore	J & R White, West Cowes	3 April 1856	Tank vessel in 1874. Hulked in 1882. Broken up at Bermuda in June 1885
Amelia	J & R White, West Cowes	19 May 1856	Broken up at Pembroke on 29 September 1865
Foam	Wigram & Sons, Northam	8 May 1856	Hauled up for storage in 1857. Sold for breaking in June 1867
Wave	Wigram & Sons, Northam	25 June 1856	Never completed as a gunboat. Coal hulk in 1869. Hulk, renamed Clinker on 30 December 1882. Sold in 1890
Magnet	Briggs & Company, Sunderland	29 January 1856	Broken up at Chatham in 1874
Manly	Briggs & Company, Sunderland	29 January 1856	Broken up at Deptford in January 1864
Mastiff	Briggs & Company, Sunderland	22 February 1856	Broken up at Deptford in October 1863
Mistletoe	Briggs & Company, Sunderland	22 February 1856	Breaking completed at Sheerness on 28 September 1864
Earnest	William Patterson & Son, Bristol	29 March 1856	Placed in storage after completion. Sold to Castle for breaking at Charlton on 17 January 1885
Escort	William Patterson & Son, Bristol	26 May 1856	Broken up at Pembroke in October 1865
