= HMS Nile (1839) =

Ship of the line of the Royal Navy

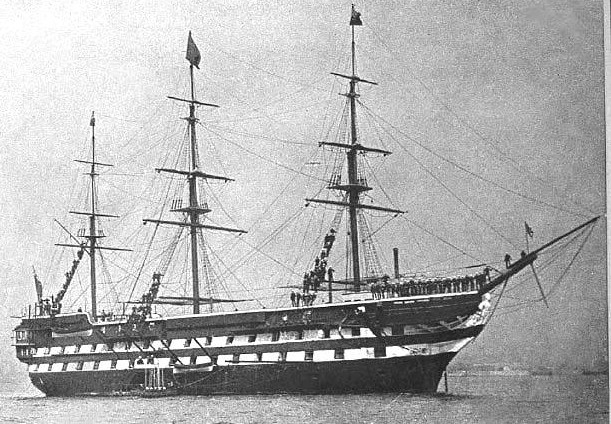
- As Conway at Rock Ferry

History

United Kingdom
- Name: Nile
- Namesake: Battle of the Nile, 1798
- Ordered: November 1826
- Builder: Plymouth Dockyard
- Laid down: October 1827
- Launched: 28 June 1839
- Commissioned: 30 January 1854
- Decommissioned: 23 April 1864
- Out of service: 23 April 1864
- Renamed: Conway, 24 July 1876
- Reclassified: As a training ship, 1876
- Fate: Wrecked, 14 May 1953, destroyed by fire, 31 October 1956

General characteristics
- Class & type: Rodney-class ship of the line
- Tons burthen: 2,598 bm
- Length: 205 ft 6 in (62.64 m) (gun deck)
- Beam: 54 ft 5 in (16.59 m)
- Depth of hold: 23 ft 2 in (7.06 m)
- Propulsion: Sails
- Sail plan: Full-rigged ship
- Complement: 820
- Armament: All muzzle-loading, smoothbore guns; Lower gun deck: 32 × 32 pdr guns, 2 × 8 in (203 mm) shell guns; Upper gun deck: 32 × 32 pdr guns, 2 × 8 in shell guns; Forecastle & Quarterdeck: 24 × 32 pdr guns

General characteristics (as converted)
- Tons burthen: 2,622 55/94 bm
- Length: 205 ft 6 in (62.6 m) (gun deck)
- Beam: 54 ft 3 in (16.5 m)
- Depth of hold: 23 ft 2 in (7.06 m)
- Installed power: Boilers; 928 ihp (692 kW)
- Propulsion: 1 shaft; 1 single-expansion steam engine
- Speed: 6.9 knots (12.8 km/h; 7.9 mph)
- Complement: 850
- Armament: Lower gun deck: 14 × 32 pdr guns, 18 × 8 in shell guns; Upper gun deck: 28 × 32 pdr guns, 6 × 8 in shell guns; Forecastle & Quarterdeck: 24 × 32 pdr guns, 1 × 68 pdr gun

HMS Nile was a 90-gun, second-rate, Rodney-class ship of the line built for the Royal Navy in the 1830s. Completed in 1839, she was immediately placed in reserve, or "in ordinary" as the RN termed it. The ship was the first of the sisters to be converted to screw propulsion in 1852–1854 and was assigned to blockade duties with the Baltic Fleet during the Crimean War of 1854–1856. Nile often served as a flagship for the North America and West Indies Station and as a guardship in Ireland. The ship was placed in ordinary for the last time in 1864 and was converted into a training ship and renamed Conway in 1875. She ran aground while being towed to Birkenhead for a refit in 1953 and her wreck was destroyed by fire three years later.

== Background and description ==
The ships were 205 feet 6 inches (62.6 m) at the gun deck and 170 feet 1 inch (51.8 m) at the keel. The Rodney class had a beam of 54 feet 5 inches (16.6 m), a depth of hold of 23 feet (7.0 m) and measured 2,625 69/94 tons burthen. Their crew numbered 720 in peacetime and 820 in wartime. The ships had the usual three-masted full-ship rig with a sail area of 28,102 square feet (2,610.8 m^{2}).

The muzzle-loading, smoothbore armament of the Rodney class initially consisted of thirty-two 32-pounder (63 cwt) guns (Note: "Cwt" is the abbreviation for hundredweight, 63 cwt referring to the weight of the gun.) and two 8-inch (203 mm) (50 cwt) shell guns on the lower gun deck and thirty-two 32-pounder (55 cwt) and two 8-inch (50 cwt) shell guns on the upper gun deck. Between their forecastle and quarterdeck, they carried twenty-four 32-pounder (42 cwt) guns. The ships were later rearmed with twenty-six 32-pounders (56 cwt) and six 8-inch shell guns on the lower gundeck and thirty 32-pounders (56 cwt) and six 8-inch shell guns on the upper deck. The number of guns on the forecastle and quarterdeck increased to twenty-six 32-pounders (42 cwt) guns.

=== Conversion ===
Never having seen active service, Captain Baldwin Wake Walker, the Surveyor of the Navy, ordered Nile to be converted into a screw-propelled ship of the line in 1852 over concerns about the number of French screw ships of the line under construction. The ship used the 500-nominal horsepower engine built by Seaward & Capel from the cancelled frigate Euphrates. To evaluate the effects of the ship's fuller hull form on the propeller's efficiency, the least possible alteration to the stern was to be made and the ship was not to be lengthened as was usually done. She measured 2,622 55/94 tons burthen and her crew increased to 850 officers and ratings. Her boilers produced enough steam that the two-cylinder, horizontal engine produced 928 indicated horsepower (692 kW) which gave Nile a speed of 6.9 knots (12.8 km/h; 7.9 mph) during her sea trials in early 1854. To reduce drag and improve performance under sail, the ship could hoist her propeller into the hull and retract the telescoping funnel.

The lower gun deck armament of the converted ships consisted of eighteen 8-inch (65 cwt) shell guns and fourteen 32-pounders (56 cwt). The upper gun deck had six 8-inch shell guns and twenty-eight 32-pounders (56 cwt). The combined armament of the forecastle and quarterdeck totalled twenty-four 32-pounders (42 cwt) and a single 68-pounder (95 cwt) pivot gun.

== Construction and career ==
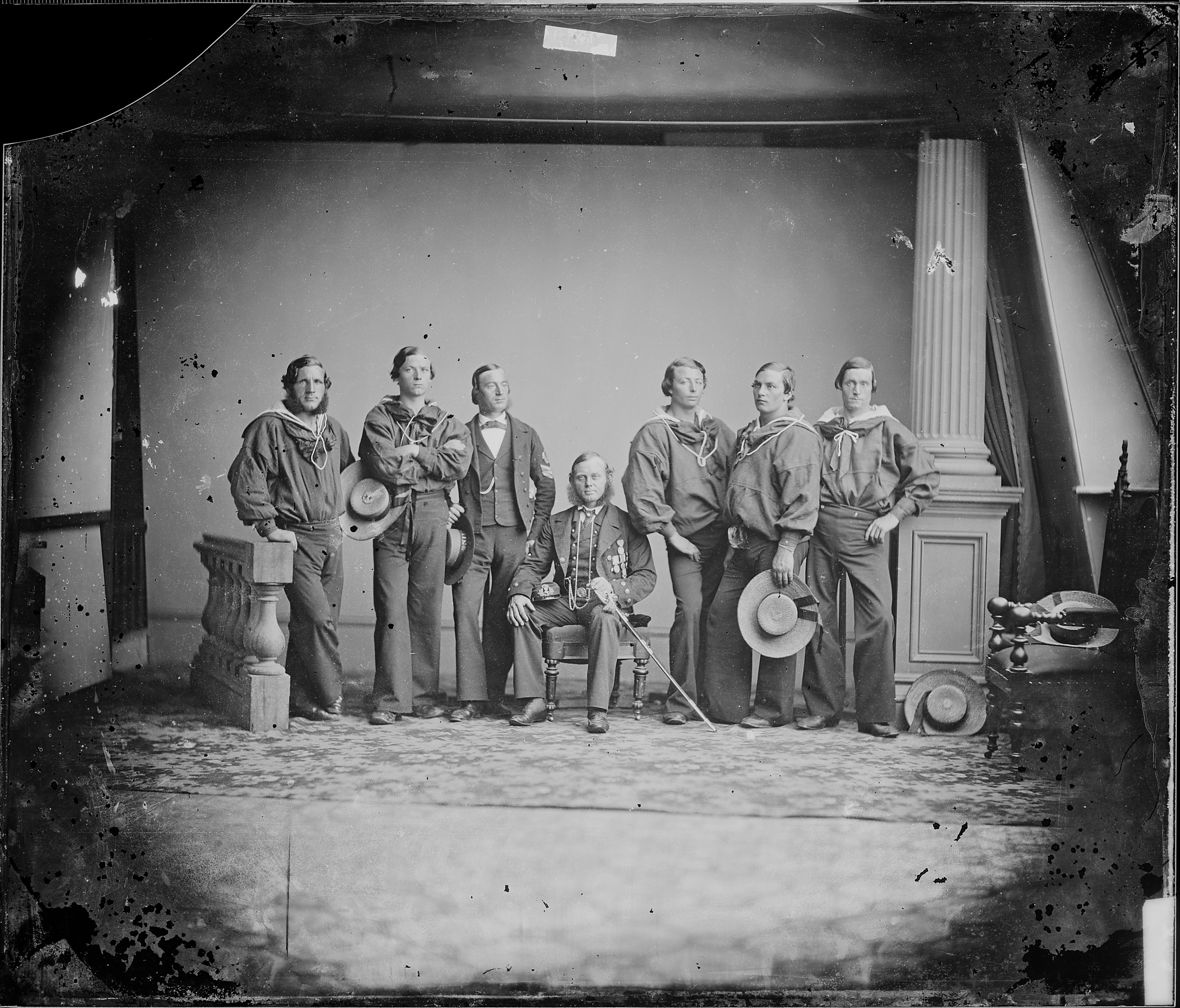
Some crewmen from Nile, c. 1861–1865

The second ship of her name to serve in the RN, and named after the 1798 British victory in the Battle of the Nile, the ship was launched on 28 June 1839. Upon her completion on 12 August 1839, but before she was commissioned, Nile was placed in ordinary at Devonport. The ship was fitted as a demonstration ship from October 1840 to March 1841. Her conversion into a screw ship of the line was ordered on 24 November 1852 and the work began on 14 December. Nile was undocked on 30 January 1854 and was commissioned by Commodore Henry Martin on 25 February. The ship was completed in April and assigned to the Western Squadron.

The decisive Russian victory in the Battle of Sinop over the Ottoman Navy on 30 November 1853 alarmed politicians in both Britain and France. They decided to intervene on the side of the Ottomans and the British began forming a Baltic Fleet in February 1854 in anticipation of war. The Russians did not withdraw their forces in the Balkans as demanded by the British and French governments on 27 February and declarations of war by both governments followed a month later. Admiral Sir Charles Napier, commander-in-chief of the Baltic Fleet, was charged to blockade the exit from the Baltic Sea and all of the Russian ports therein. Nile is known to have been with the fleet by 13 June when the bulk of the French contingent rendezvoused with the British fleet. Captain Rodney Mundy relieved Martin on 17 July. The ship did not participate in any of the minor actions in 1854 and was part of the force based near Nargen Island (now Naissaar) blockading Reval (now Tallinn) and the southern coast of the Gulf of Finland by late 1854. By 19 October, bad weather had forced the ships to withdraw to Kiel, Germany, where they blockaded the entrance to the Baltic Sea until December when they were ordered home.

The ship returned to the Baltic in early 1855. On 12 September, Nile and the frigate Arrogant destroyed some Russian transports in the Bay of Virta Nemi. Six days later, the ship's boats boarded and burnt some Russian vessels near Hammeliski (possibly Humaliski on the island of Björkö, now called Primorsk, Leningrad Oblast). At the end of that month, the fleet began to return to the United Kingdom and on 23 April 1856, participating ships, including Nile, attended a Review of the Fleet at Spithead by Queen Victoria. In June 1856, Nile was assigned to the North American and West Indies Station and returned to Plymouth on 31 March 1857 to be paid off on 20 April. She was refitted from July to April 1858 to serve as the guardship for Queenstown (modern Cobh) in County Cork, Ireland. Nile was recommissioned on 1 March 1858 by Captain Henry Chads as the flagship of his father, Rear-Admiral Henry Ducie Chads, in Queenstown.

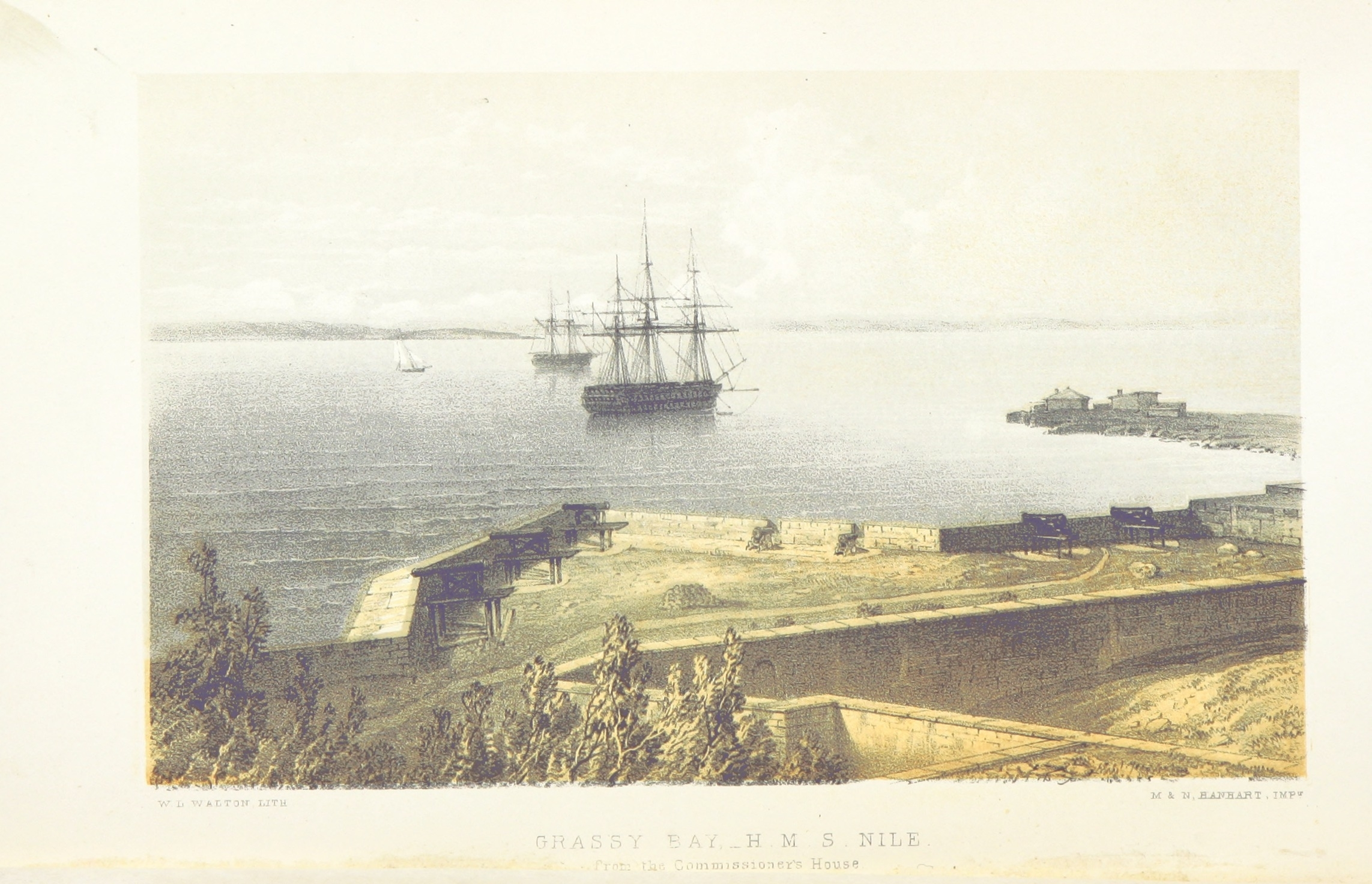
Nile at the Grassy Bay anchorage, seen from the Commissioner's House, at the Royal Naval Dockyard, Bermuda

Captain Arthur Eardley-Wilmot relieved Chads on 7 December as the flagship of Rear-Admiral Charles Talbot. Nile had her boilers and piping replaced in April 1859 at Devonport. Captain Edward King Barnard relieved Eardley-Wilmot in his turn on 31 December as the ship returned to the North American and West Indies Station and became the flagship of Rear Admiral Alexander Milne, the commander-in-chief of the station. She conducted her sea trials at sea on 7 April 1860, reaching 8.2 knots (15.2 km/h; 9.4 mph) from 1,247 ihp (930 kW).

Nile operated from Bermuda and Halifax Naval Yard, Nova Scotia, during the tense period following the Trent Affair in 1861, when the United Kingdom's entry into the American Civil War seemed possible, eventually cementing cordial relations with the Union by means of a visit to New York City in September 1863. Returning to Plymouth in the following April, she was paid off on 23 April 1864and placed in ordinary. Her engines, boilers and propellers were removed between March and May 1875 and Nile was refitted the following year to prepare her for service as a training ship.

=== Training ship at Liverpool as HMS Conway ===
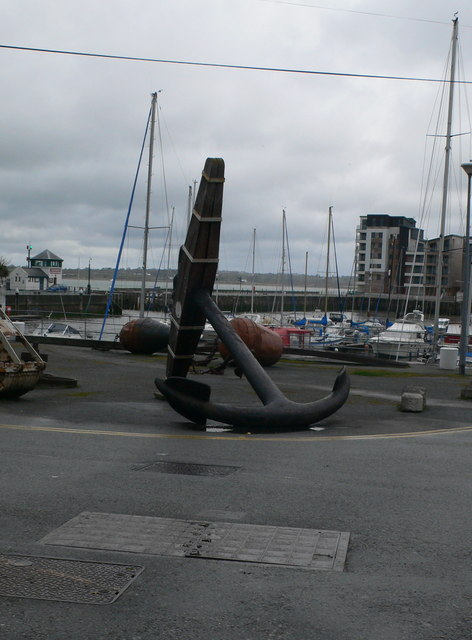
An Admiralty Pattern anchor from Conway at Victoria Dock, Caernarfon, Wales

The ship was loaned to the Mercantile Marine Service Association at Liverpool and renamed HMS Conway on 24 July 1876. She replaced the previous Conway (ex-HMS Winchester) which had proved to be too small. The third HMS Conway (ex-Nile) remained at a mooring off Rock Ferry Pier in Wirral and was home to up to 250 cadets. She was refitted twice during this time. In October 1940, Conway was struck by SS Hektoria, a 13,000-ton whaling factory ship, and moved to a dock at Birkenhead for repairs. During the Liverpool Blitz there was concern that there might be considerable loss of life if the ship were hit and she moved to Glyn Garth Mooring on the Menai Straits, Anglesey, in May 1941. In 1949 she moved further along the Strait to a new mooring off Plas Newydd where a shore establishment was also established.

In 1953, the association decided to return Conway to Birkenhead for a refit. On 14 April, the ship left her moorings in the Menai Strait under tow, but was driven ashore shortly afterwards by unexpectedly strong tides and wrecked, watched by a large crowd on the Menai Suspension Bridge. A fire on 31 October 1956 occurred while she was being dismantled which destroyed her. One may still find nails and timber at the site. Two Admiralty Pattern anchors from Conway survive; one at the Merseyside Maritime Museum in Liverpool and one on Caernarfon marine promenade.
