= Henry Chads =

Royal Navy Admiral (1819–1906)

Admiral Sir Henry Chads KCB
- Born: 27 October 1819; Fareham, Hampshire
- Died: 29 June 1906 (aged 86); Southsea, Hampshire
- Military career
- Allegiance: United Kingdom
- Branch: Royal Navy
- Service years: 1832–1884
- Rank: Admiral
- Commands: HMS Portland; HMS Amphion; HMS Conway; HMS Nile; HMS London; Nore Command
- Awards: Knight Commander of the Order of the Bath

Admiral Sir Henry Chads KCB (27 October 1819 – 29 June 1906) was a Royal Navy officer who went on to be Commander-in-Chief, The Nore.

== Naval career ==
Born the son of Admiral Sir Henry Ducie Chads, Henry Chads joined the Royal Navy in 1832 and went on to take part in operations against Malay pirates in the Strait of Malacca.

Promoted to captain in 1848, he commanded HMS Portland, HMS Amphion, HMS Conway, HMS Nile and then HMS London. He was appointed Captain-Superintendent of Deptford Dockyard in 1863 and Commander-in-Chief, The Nore in 1876 before retiring in 1884.

He lived at Portland House in Southsea and there is a memorial to him in St Judes Church in Portsmouth.

Military offices
Preceded by George Hastings	Commander-in-Chief, The Nore; 1876–1877	Succeeded by Sir William King-Hall
