= HMS London (1840) =

Ship of the line of the Royal Navy

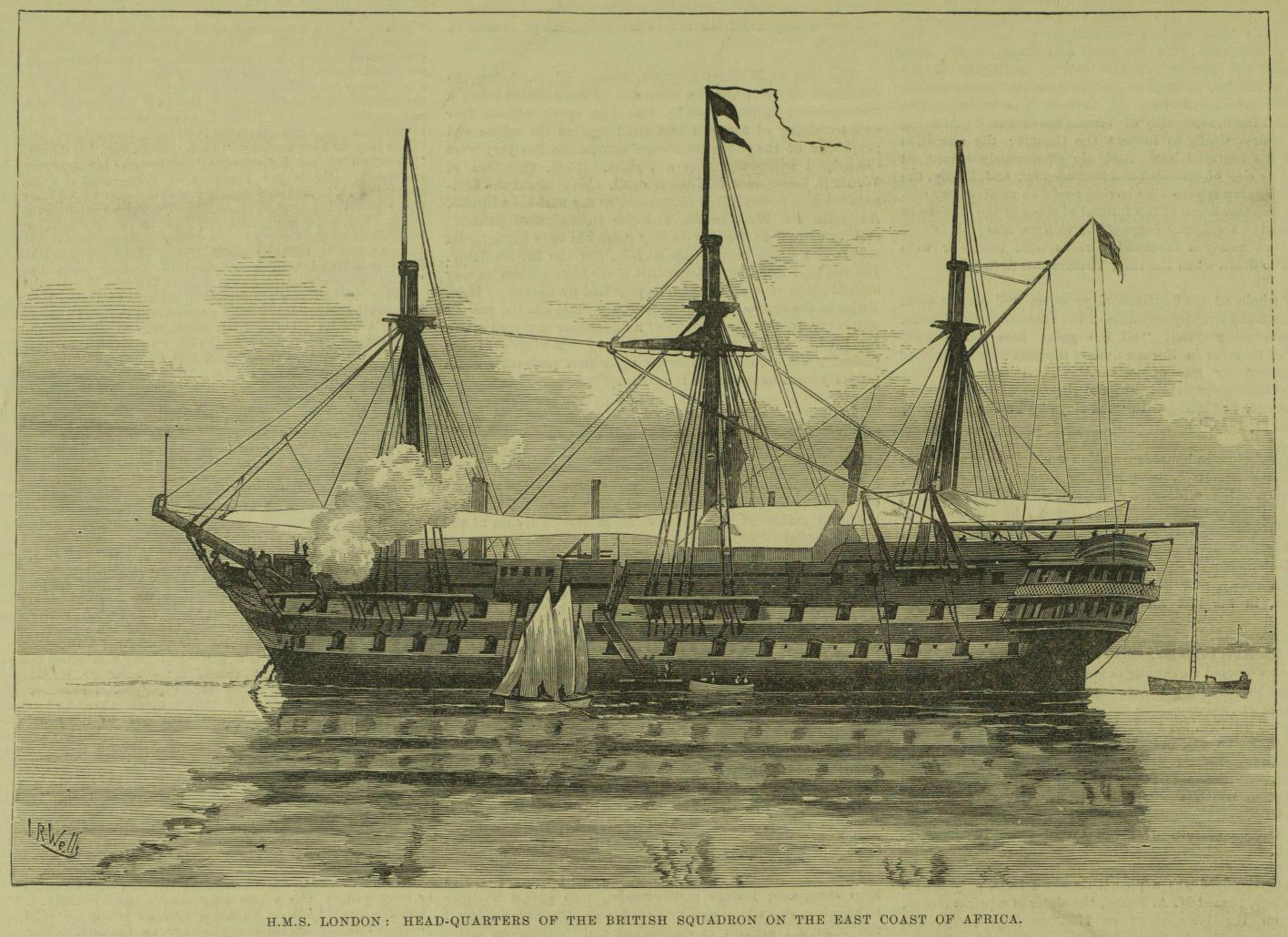
- London depicted in Zanzibar 1881

History

United Kingdom
- Name: London
- Ordered: November 1826
- Builder: HM Dockyard, Chatham
- Laid down: October 1827
- Launched: 28 September 1840
- Commissioned: 28 May 1851
- Fate: Sold for scrap, 1884

General characteristics
- Class & type: Rodney-class ship of the line
- Tons burthen: 2,598 bm
- Length: 205 ft 6 in (62.64 m) (gun deck)
- Beam: 54 ft 5 in (16.59 m)
- Depth of hold: 23 ft 2 in (7.06 m)
- Propulsion: Sails (and steam, after 1858)
- Sail plan: Full-rigged ship
- Armament: All muzzle-loading, smoothbore guns: Lower gun deck: 30 × 32 pdrs + 2 × 68 pdr carronades; Upper gun deck: 34 × 32 pdrs; Forecastle & Quarterdeck: 26 × 32 pdrs

General characteristics (after conversion)
- Tons burthen: 2,687 (bm)
- Length: 213 ft 3 in (65 m) (gun deck)
- Beam: 54 ft 3 in (16.5 m)
- Depth of hold: 22 ft 7 in (6.9 m)
- Installed power: Boilers; 1,804 ihp (1,345 kW)
- Propulsion: 1 shaft; 1 single-expansion steam engine
- Speed: 11.5 knots (21.3 km/h; 13.2 mph)
- Complement: 850
- Armament: Lower gun deck: 14 × 32 pdr guns + 18 × 8 in shell guns; Upper gun deck: 28 × 32 pdr guns + 6 × 8 in shell guns; Forecastle & Quarterdeck: 24 × 32 pdr guns + 1 × 68 pdr gun

HMS London was a 90-gun, second-rate, Rodney-class ship of the line built for the Royal Navy (RN) in the 1830s. Completed in 1841, she was immediately placed in reserve, or "in ordinary" as the RN termed it. The ship was finally commissioned a dozen years later and served as a flagship in home waters until the beginning of the Crimean War with the Russian Empire in 1854. London participated in the bombardment of Sevastopol later that year. She was badly damaged in a storm in late 1854 and was transferred to the Mediterranean Fleet. The ship did not further participate in the war, although she served as a troopship to return troops to Britain after the end of the war in 1856.

London was converted into a screw-propelled ship in 1857–1858 and rejoined the Mediterranean Fleet after its completion. The ship was paid off in 1863 and was serving as a storeship in Zanzibar by 1874 as part of the RN's effort to suppress slavery in the Indian Ocean. Her mission was to support the other ships assigned to that task as well as use her own boats. One of her captains was killed by slavers in 1881 when attempting to seize their ship. London was scrapped three years later.

== Design and description ==
The Rodney-class ships were designed by Sir Robert Seppings, co-Surveyor of the Navy, in response to the American USS Ohio and the French 100-gun Hercule class. The ships were 205 feet 6 inches (62.6 m) at the gun deck and 170 feet 1 inch (51.8 m) at the keel. The ships had a beam of 54 feet 5 inches (16.6 m), a depth of hold of 23 feet (7.0 m) and measured 2,625 69/94 tons burthen. Their crew numbered 720 in peacetime and 820 in wartime. The ships had the usual three-masted full-ship rig with a sail area of 28,102 square feet (2,610.8 m^{2}).

The muzzle-loading, smoothbore armament of the Rodney class consisted of thirty-two 32-pounder (63 cwt) guns (Note: "Cwt" is the abbreviation for hundredweight, referring to a gun that weighs 3,455 kg (7,617 lb).) and two 8-inch (203 mm) (50 cwt) shell guns on the lower gun deck and thirty-two 32-pounder (55 cwt) and two 8-inch (50 cwt) shell guns on the upper gun deck. Between their forecastle and quarterdeck, they carried twenty-four 32-pounder (42 cwt) guns. The ships were later rearmed with twenty-six 32-pounders (56 cwt) and six 8-inch shell guns on the lower gundeck and thirty 32-pounders (56 cwt) and six 8-inch shell guns on the upper deck. The number of guns on the forecastle and quarterdeck increased to twenty-six 32-pounders (42 cwt) guns.

=== Conversion ===
Based on the experiences gained during the Crimean War, Captain Baldwin Wake Walker, Surveyor of the Navy, favored converting first- and second-rate ships as they could accommodate the engines and their required coal better than smaller ships. Nile was the first ship of the class to be converted to screw propulsion and her hull was not modified to accommodate the engine and propeller. Her mediocre performance confirmed that the ships needed to be lengthened and their sterns rebuilt to get the best performance and London was ordered to be converted accordingly on 11 December 1856. Work began the following month and she was lengthened to 213 feet 3 inches (65 m) which modestly increased her tons burthen to 2,687. (Note: Tons burthen was a measure of a ship’s cargo-carrying capacity calculated under Builder's Old Measurement. As it was calculated principally from the ship’s dimensions, the measurement did not take into account the internal space occupied by the boilers, coal bunkers, engine, and associated machinery after the ship’s conversion to steam power.) The ship received a 500-nominal horsepower engine built by Ravenhill, Salkeld & Co. that gave London a speed of 11.5 knots (21.3 km/h; 13.2 mph) during her sea trials on 15 December 1858 from 1,804 indicated horsepower (1,345 kW), although her masts and stores were not yet fitted. To reduce drag and improve performance under sail, the ship could hoist her propeller into the hull and retract the telescoping funnel. London's conversion was so successful that she served as a model for the subsequent conversions of the five first-rate ships of the broadened Caledonia class and HMS Queen.

The lower gun deck armament of the converted ships consisted of eighteen 8-inch (65 cwt) shell guns and fourteen 32-pounders (56 cwt). The upper gun deck had six 8-inch shell guns and twenty-eight 32-pounders (56 cwt). The combined armament of the forecastle and quarterdeck totalled twenty-four 32-pounders (42 cwt) and a single 68-pounder (95 cwt) pivot gun.

== Construction and career ==
Named after the British capital city, London was the ninth ship of her name to serve in the RN, and was ordered in November 1826. The ship was laid down at Chatham Dockyard in October 1827 and launched on 28 September 1840. Upon her completion on 25 February 1841, but before she was commissioned, London was placed in ordinary at Sheerness. The ship was commissioned by Captain George Mundy on 28 May 1851 as the flagship of Vice-Admiral Josceline Percy, Commander-in-Chief, Sheerness. Captain Montagu Stopford briefly relieved Mundy in January 1852, although Mundy replaced him on 1 April. Captain Charles Eden assumed command on 16 April 1853.

The decisive Russian victory in the Battle of Sinop over the Ottoman Navy on 30 November 1853 alarmed politicians in both Britain and France. They decided to intervene on the side of the Ottomans and both countries ordered ships from their Mediterranean Fleets into the Bosphorus on 24 December and then into the Black Sea on 3 January 1854. The Russians made no effort to interfere with the Allied forces escorting Ottoman troopships and transports to the Caucasus, but did not withdraw their forces in the Balkans as demanded by the British and French governments on 27 February. Declarations of war by both governments followed a month later, although the British commanders in the Black Sea did not learn of this until 9 April.

London and her sister Rodney contributed sailors to a landing party that assisted Turkish forces at Roustchouk (modern Ruse, Bulgaria), building a pontoon bridge and manning Turkish gunboats on the Danube River, in July–August 1854. The following month, the sisters offloaded some of their 32-pounder guns and their crews to serve as siege artillery during the siege of Sevastopol. They also contributed other crewmen and Royal Marines to the ad-hoc Naval Brigade. Between them, the sisters lost 31 men killed and 128 wounded of these men serving ashore. During the naval bombardment on 17 October, London was assigned to the advanced squadron that closed to 1,000 yards (910 m) away from Fort Constantine. Once the bombardment began the British ships were frequently struck by Russian shells; London was forced to withdraw with four men killed and eighteen wounded after having been set afire by red-hot shot three times in two hours. Four weeks later, the ship was badly damaged during the Great Storm of 1854 that struck the fleet's anchorage on 14 November. Four days later, Captain Lewis Jones relieved Eden who had taken sick. Jones was replaced by Captain Augustus Kuper on 13 August 1855 and was relieved by Captain William Jervis in his turn on 24 January 1856. For the planned 1856 campaign in the Baltic, London and Rodney were converted into mortar depot ships, housing 110 spare 13-inch (330 mm) mortars each. Their deployment was forestalled by the signing of the Treaty of Paris (1856) in March that ended the war. London was then assigned to the Mediterranean Fleet until she was used to transport troops home after the war. She was paid off on 25 August.

The ship began her conversion into a screw-powered ship on 14 January 1857 and the work was completed on 13 May 1858. London was outfitted for the sea on 21 January 1859, but was not commissioned until 12 May when Captain Henry Chads assumed command. He was replaced by his father, Captain Henry Ducie Chads, four days later and the ship was assigned to the Mediterranean Fleet. She was paid off on 6 February 1862.

By 1874, she was a hulk, serving as a storeship in Zanzibar, off the east coast of Africa, tasked with supporting the effort to suppress the Indian Ocean slave trade. Captain George Sulivan was appointed to the ship in April; in January 1875 he took a landing party to put down a revolt in Mombasa and returned the city to the control of the Sultan of Zanzibar. He was relieved by Captain Thomas Sulivan on 27 September 1875. The ship's boats captured 39 slave-trading dhows between October 1874 and April 1876. Sulivan was replaced in his turn by Captain Hamilton Earle on 27 July 1878. Captained by Charles Brownrigg from 8 June 1880, London herself and her crew made several patrols aimed at hindering the slave trade and, on 3 December 1881, caught up with a dhow captained by Hindi bin Hattam. This dhow had around 100 enslaved people on board and was transporting them between Pemba and Zanzibar. Brownrigg led a boarding party to release the enslaved people, but bin Hattam's men attacked the sailors, killing Brownrigg and some of his party before sailing away. Sir Lloyd Mathews led a force to Wete, Pemba, and, after a short battle, took a mortally wounded bin Hattem (Hindi-bin-Khartoum) prisoner before returning to Zanzibar. Captain Percy Luxmore assumed command on 9 December 1881. London was scrapped in Zanzibar in 1884.

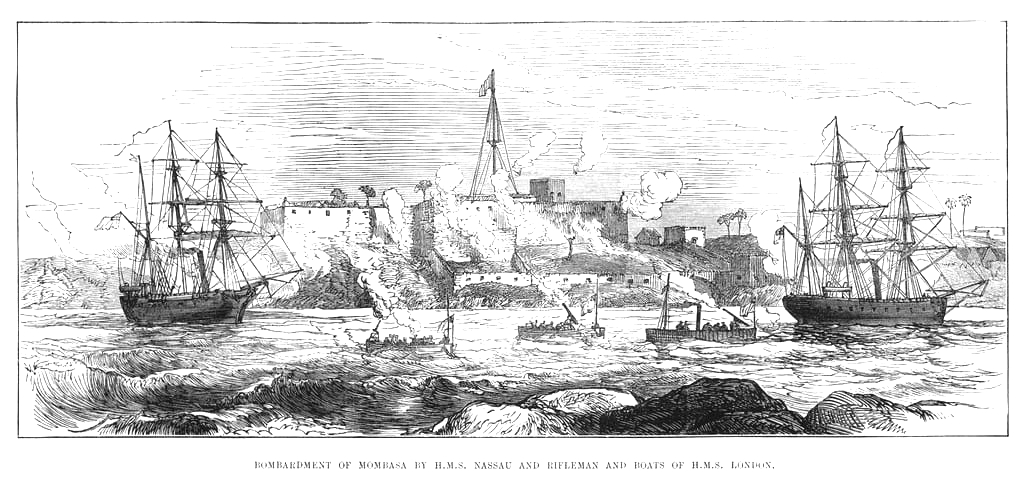
19 January 1875 the bombardment of Mombasa by HMS Nassau and Rifleman and boats of HMS London, Illustrated London News

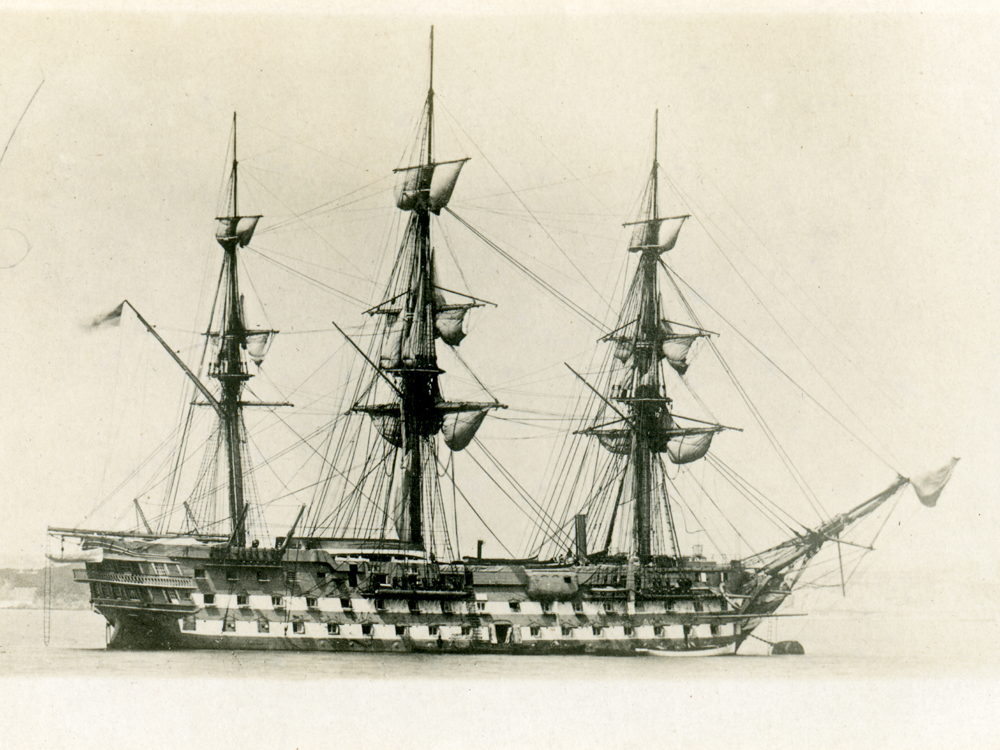
HMS London in Zanzibar circa 1876.

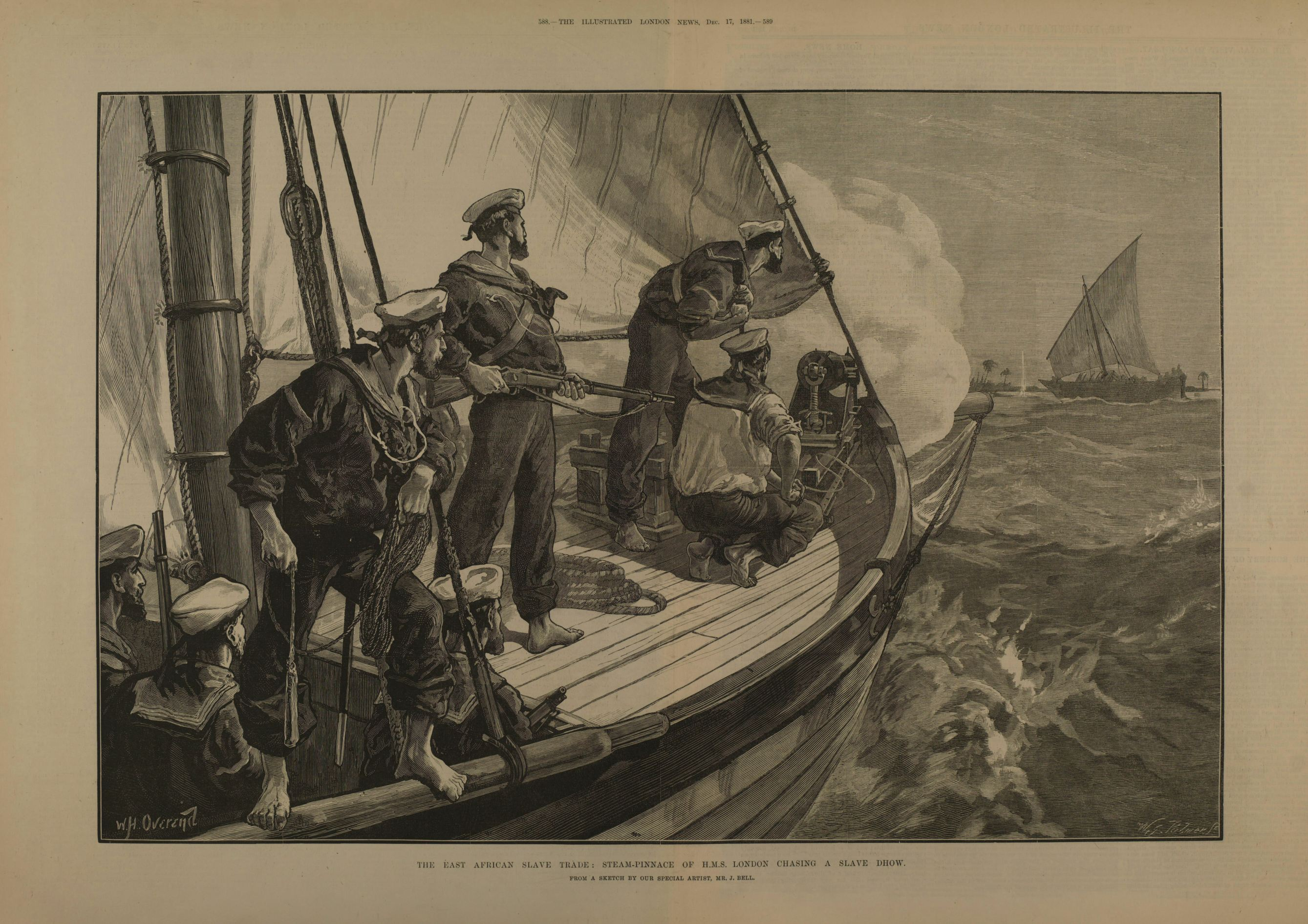
Pinnace attached to HMS London chasing a dhow in 1881

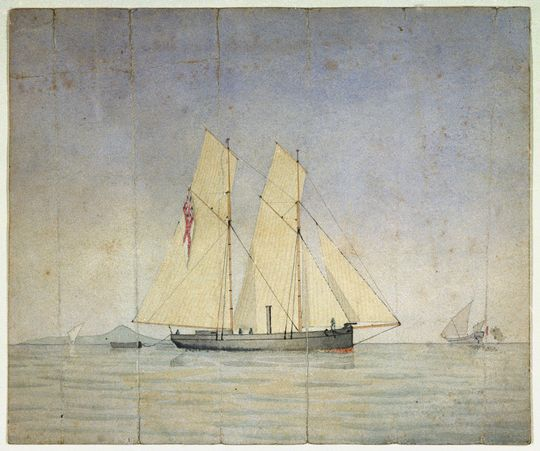
A pinnace probably attached to the London for chasing slave ships.

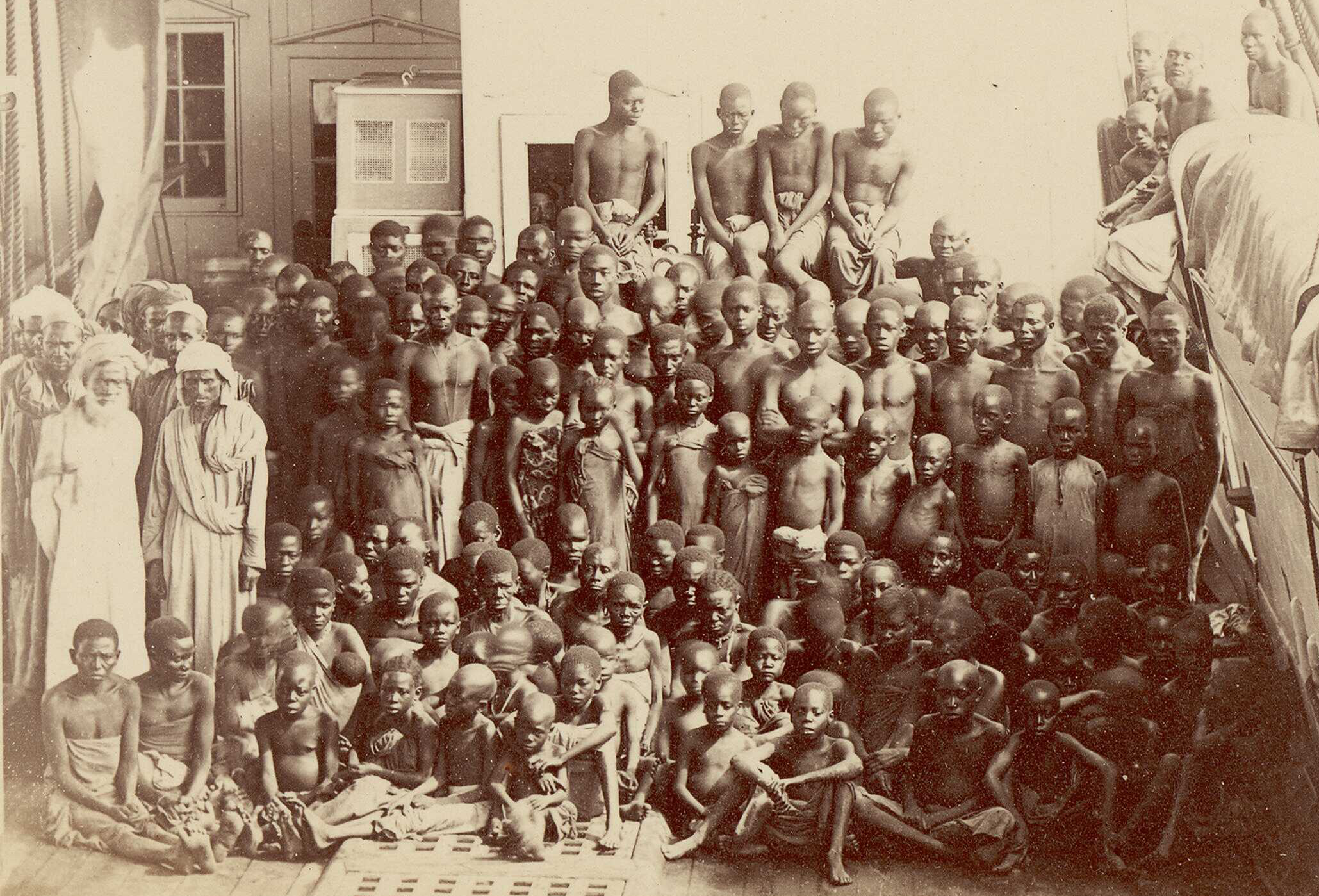
Newly released slaves on board HMS London, circa 1880
