= HMS Conway (school ship) =

Royal Navy training school

Coordinates: 53.204°N 4.217°W

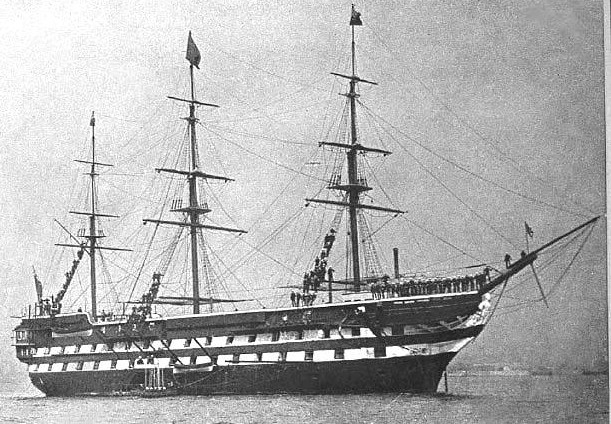
- HMS Conway (ex-HMS Nile) at Rock Ferry

History

United Kingdom
- Name: HMS Conway
- Fate: Wrecked 1953

General characteristics 1875 – 1953 (ex-HMS Nile)
- Class & type: Rodney-class ship of the line
- Tons burthen: 2598 bm
- Length: 205 ft 6 in (62.64 m) (gundeck)
- Beam: 54 ft 5 in (16.59 m)
- Depth of hold: 23 ft 2 in (7.06 m)
- Sail plan: Full-rigged ship

General characteristics 1953–1974
- Class & type: "Stone frigate" at Plas Newydd

HMS Conway was a naval training school or "school ship", founded in 1859 and housed for most of her life aboard a 19th-century wooden ship of the line. The ship was originally stationed on the Mersey near Liverpool, then moved to the Menai Strait during World War II. While being towed back to Birkenhead for a refit in 1953, she ran aground and was wrecked, and later burned. The school moved to purpose-built premises on Anglesey where it continued for another twenty years.

== Origins ==
In the mid-19th century, the demand for a reliable standard of merchant navy officers had grown to the point where ship owners decided to set up an organisation to train, and indeed educate, them properly—the Mercantile Marine Service Association.

One of the first sites chosen for a school ship was Liverpool, in 1857. The ship they chose to accommodate the school, to be provided by the Admiralty and moored in the Sloyne, off Rock Ferry on the River Mersey, was the corvette HMS Conway. There were to be three Conways over the years, the name being transferred to the new ship each time it was replaced. In 1861 HMS Winchester took the name, but the one that housed the school for most of its life was lent by the Royal Navy to the Mercantile Marine Service Association in 1875. This was the two-decker Nile, a 92-gun second-rate line-of-battle ship. She was 205 ft (62.5 m) long on the gundeck, 54 ft (16 m) in beam, and displaced 4,375 long tons. During her operational life she was equipped with ten 8-inch (200 mm) guns and eighty-two 30-pounders. Launched in June 1839, she was entirely built from West African hardwoods and copper fastened, with copper sheathing anti-fouling to her under parts. She had survived the Baltic Blockade during the Crimean War, later protecting British possessions in the Caribbean and 'showing the flag' along the eastern seaboard of North America 50 years after the British surrender at Yorktown. In 1876 she was renamed Conway and moored on the Mersey.

The ship, already a century old, was refitted in the dry dock at Birkenhead between 1936 and 1938. She was also fitted with a new figurehead representing Nelson, which was ceremonially unveiled by the then Poet Laureate John Masefield, an alumnus of the school (1891–1893). (Note: A short newsreel clip of the unveiling of the figurehead can be downloaded from the British Pathé website (search for "Conway").)

By 1953 she had already outlived both her sisters, Rodney and London, by more than 70 years.

== From Mersey to Menai ==
In 1941, with air raids on the Liverpool docks taking place, Conway had already survived several near misses. It was decided to move the ship from the Mersey to Anglesey, where she remained moored for the duration of the war between the former Bishop's Palace at Glyn Garth and the Gazelle Hotel, in line with the Catalina flying boat moorings along the Anglesey shore. This being wartime there was no official announcement of the move and local residents were startled one evening to see a picturesque Nelson-era ship of the line, a "wooden wall", entering the Menai Strait. Subsequently, ship-to-shore traffic was across the Menai Strait to the pier-head at Bangor or to the Gazelle Hotel ferry terminal and she became something of a local tourist attraction.

At the end of the 1940s there was a surge in demand for merchant navy cadets. The ship did not have space for more cadets so the ship's superintendent, Captain Goddard, started looking for space ashore with playing fields and a shore establishment. He picked on Plas Newydd, the stately home of the Marquess of Anglesey, a large part of which had been vacated by the U.S. Army Intelligence Corps at the end of the War. This site seemed ideal, except that the seabed provided very poor anchorage, so four five-ton anchors were sunk there. Only one problem remained: could the ship be moved there in one piece? She would need to be towed by tugs through a stretch of water between Anglesey and the mainland, known as the "Swellies". This area, bounded by the two Menai bridges (the Menai Suspension Bridge and Britannia Bridge), is notorious for underwater shoals and dangerous, complex tidal streams as well as a non-tidal current varied by the wind and atmospheric pressure. Captain Goddard was proud of his experience as a hydrographic surveyor, and having studied the problem, believed it was possible.

After a false start the day before, the ship was moved successfully on 13 April 1949, in spite of what was obviously a great risk. Conway remains by far the deepest ship ever to have passed through the Swellies. Her draft was 22 feet (6.71 m) aft and the underwater clearances were marginal. The overhead clearance under Menai Suspension Bridge, which is 100 feet (30.48 m) above high water, was estimated to be three feet, all depending upon the actual height of the tide at the time of passing through. "I was glad when it was accomplished," Captain Goddard wrote. "It created a great deal of interest amongst the North Wales seafaring fraternity who had declared the undertaking to be a foolish one."

== Loss of the ship ==
HMS Conway school flag.

By 1953 another refit was due. This could not be done locally so the ship had to be taken back to Birkenhead dry dock, passing back through the Swellies once more. The operation took place on 14 April 1953. There were the same two Liverpool tugs which had shifted her several times before, Dongarth forward and Minegarth aft. The new Captain Superintendent, Captain E Hewitt, was in command, with two Trinity House local pilots – Mr R D Jones (junior) aboard the head tug, and Mr R J Jones (senior) – advising Captain Hewitt, and the Blue Funnel Liverpool pilot Mr James Miller overseeing the towage.

High water at Liverpool that morning was 11:18, at a height of 32'10" and was the highest tide that year. Laver's Almanac quotes high water at Menai Bridge as 28 minutes before high water Liverpool. What is termed 'slack' in the Swellies is actually a brief period of uneasy equilibrium between two opposing flood streams which typically occurs 1 hour 42 minutes before local high water, or at 09:08 on the morning of the move. Owing to the strength of the southwest-going ebb, which runs at 8 knots during a spring tide, there is a confused complex tidal flow among the numerous rocks and islets generating many powerful eddies. On a big tide in particular it is vital for an outbound vessel to be through the Swellies before the tide turns against her. It is therefore the local practice to start an outward transit with the last of the northeast-going flood 20 minutes before the 'slack', or at 08:48 on the morning of the move. Captain Hewitt had worked with the Caernarfon harbour master, Captain Rees Thomas, in preparing his plan, and had several times made a passage of the Swellies in the Conway's motor boat, checking his timings at 4 knots (7.4 km/h; 4.6 mph). He also consulted Conway's old log book for the timings of the previous transit, and had planned to arrive at the bridge at 09:20.

The streams in the Menai Strait are affected by winds outside in the Irish Sea. With a strong north or north-westerly wind both the rate and duration of the southwest-going ebb are increased, and the southwest-going ebb may begin quarter of an hour earlier. The 0600 synoptic chart showed a stationary deep depression west of Norway with a secondary low in the North Sea, and a high steadily closing the west coast of Ireland, which could be expected to result in an increasingly strong northwesterly wind in the Irish Sea. But in the shelter of the Plas Newydd mooring, there was no indication of this. At 0800 as the wind was being recorded in Conway's logbook as northerly force 1–2 (2 to 5 knots), only 13 miles away on station off Point Lynas it was being recorded by the Liverpool pilot boat as northwesterly force 6 (22–27 knots) and her noon entry was NW force 7, (28–33 knots) while during the morning Bidston Observatory was recording gusts up to 49 knots (storm force 10).

The Investigating Subcommittee was later to express its surprise that Captain Hewitt had left the Plas Newydd mooring without a weather forecast, and "had no knowledge of the stormy conditions prevailing at sea at the time Conway was to make the passage" since it was local knowledge that in such weather "abnormal conditions might be encountered." In addition to the tide-generated streams in the Menai Strait there is also a non-tidal current, the Southwest Residual, a dynamic reaction which directly reflects wind stress in the Irish Sea. The north-westerly mean wind speed of 16 meters per second at sea that day would enhance the Residual by 15 cm per second, increasing the strength of the southwest-going ebb at Plas Newydd by as much as 3 knots.

Conway's logbook shows she left the mooring at 0822 and arrived at Britannia Bridge at 0850, which was the locally recommended time for starting the outward transit and Jones the pilot naturally advised keeping her going with the last of the northeast-going flood tide behind her. Instead Captain Hewitt had the ship brought up for half an hour to wait until 0920. The severe wind in the Irish Sea caused the stream in the Strait to turn to the westward earlier which eliminated the brief slack water period. Captain F J Durrant, marine manager of the towing company, observed "The anticipated ten minute slack water did not materialise. The ebb set in immediately the flood ended at 0920." With the ship far too late and sensitive to the adverse conditions the pilot advised going back. Captain Hewitt passed the ship under Britannia Bridge at 0923 even though the ebb tide was already setting against him.

Only 17 minutes later, "At 0940 ..... the forward tug Dongarth was towing at full speed against the tide but making no further progress." By 10:10, 47 minutes after passing under the bridge, the tow was still in much the same position having made good only six tenths of a mile from the bridge, giving the tide another half an hour to develop further, yet it was not until then that Captain Hewitt had the stern tug slipped and sent forward to assist the head tug, when "headway became slight but noticeable." By 1020, already a full hour into the ebb, the pilots had worked the ship across the tide and into the eddy which the Admiralty Sailing Directions states forms near the Anglesey shore close westward of the northern pier of the Suspension Bridge, and intended holding her there in the safety of this until the strength of the tide had abated. Instead, with only 750 feet (230 m) to go to the bridge, Captain Hewitt ordered that the ship be put back in the channel and this was done. Almost immediately, at 1030, she was caught by an eddy of overwhelming strength which drove the ship ashore over The Platters. "This disastrous sheer occurred and was concluded in a matter of seconds." Contrasting with the 18 minutes she had taken to complete the inbound transit, the outbound ship had been 1 hour 7 minutes covering the 1200 yards from Britannia Bridge where the pilot had advised going back.

After both tugs on full speed for ten minutes had failed to make any impression they were instructed to stand by at Menai Bridge Pier for another attempt to re-float her on the evening tide when there would be a better opportunity if the weather at sea moderated. A third tug, Grassgarth, sent out at 1430 to assist in towing her off was forced to put back to Liverpool through stress of weather.

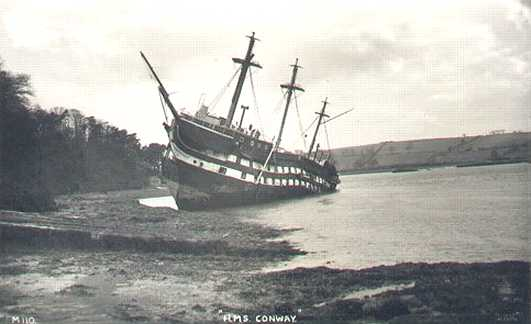
The wreck of Conway

While her forepart planted firmly on the shelving shore her stern was floating in 30 feet of water. As the tide fell the stern lost its support causing the ship to become severely hogged. Her seams opened, and about her midship sections the height between decks was reduced from over 6 feet (1.8 m) to less than 4 feet (1.2 m). "Conditions on board were very bad with the after end of the ship from the mainmast sagging downwards, and the continuous sound of cracking, twisting, rending timber and rushing water below." When the next tide made the stern failed to lift and the ship flooded freely through her open seams. Being evident that further attempts to tow the ship off would be to no purpose, the tugs were discharged and left for Liverpool the following morning. Two days after the grounding, in the evening of 16 April 1953, surveyors declared Conway a total constructive loss. The ship was not insured.

== Last years of the school ==
Conway as a "stone frigate"

The school was first rehoused in tents loaned by the British Army pitched in the grounds of Plas Newydd, the seat of the Marquess of Anglesey, overlooking the Menai Strait. These were quickly replaced by 'The Camp', temporary hutted accommodation in addition to parts of the Marquess's house already in use as a supplement to the ship's limited space. All traces of the huts have now gone but present-day visitors to Plas Newydd use the National Trust cafe that was the school's canteen. During the 1960s permanent premises were built in the grounds of Plas Newydd, where Conway's last ten years passed in what is known in naval parlance as a "stone frigate".

The school closed in 1974 after funding from the Government through Cheshire County Council ceased. The buildings now house the Conway Centre, a residential arts and outdoor education centre.

== Ranks ==
Ranks of HMS Conway
Ranks	Cuff Insignia		Equivalent
Ranks	Left	Right	Equivalent
Chief Cadet Captain			Head of School
Senior Cadet Captain		N/A	Head of House
Junior Cadet Captain		N/A	School Prefect

== Famous alumni ==
Cadets over the years included:

- Captain Herbert Haddock, first Captain of RMS Titanic
- Captain Matthew Webb (at Conway 1860–1862), the first man to swim the English Channel from England to France
- John Masefield (1891–94), Poet Laureate 1930–1967
- Lionel "Buster" Crabb (1922–1924), the Royal Navy frogman who disappeared in mysterious circumstances while on a diving mission near a Soviet warship in 1956
- Vice Admiral Sir David Brown (1927–2005)
- Ian Fraser (1936–38), awarded the Victoria Cross for commanding a midget submarine attack on the Japanese cruiser Takao in Singapore harbour.
- Captain Graham Wallin (1953-55) - the first, and still believed to be only, holder of a Foreign Going Master's Certificate, a Commercial Aircraft Licence and a Commercial Hovercraft Pilot's Licence (SRN4 - Hoverspeed & Hoverloyd)
- Iain Duncan Smith (1968–1972), leader of the Conservative Party 2001–2003
- Sir Clive Woodward (1969–1974), rugby union player and England coach
- Francis Haffey Brooke-Smith (1934–36), awarded the George Cross for bomb disposal.
- Harold Kyrle Money Bellew (1869), 19th century stage actor
- James Paul Moody (1901,1902), sixth officer in RMS Titanic
- Archibald Day (1912–1914), Hydrographer of the Navy 1950–1955

The Conway Club for ex-alumni still thrives, numbering some 1,600 Old Conways. Several affiliated overseas clubs also exist in Australia, New Zealand, Canada and the USA.

== Sources ==
- Lyon, David & Winfield, Rif (2004). The Sail and Steam Navy List: All the Ships of the Royal Navy 1815–1889. Chatham Publishing. ISBN 978-1-86176-032-6. OCLC 52620555.
