= Rodney-class ship of the line =

1839 British second-rate ships of the line

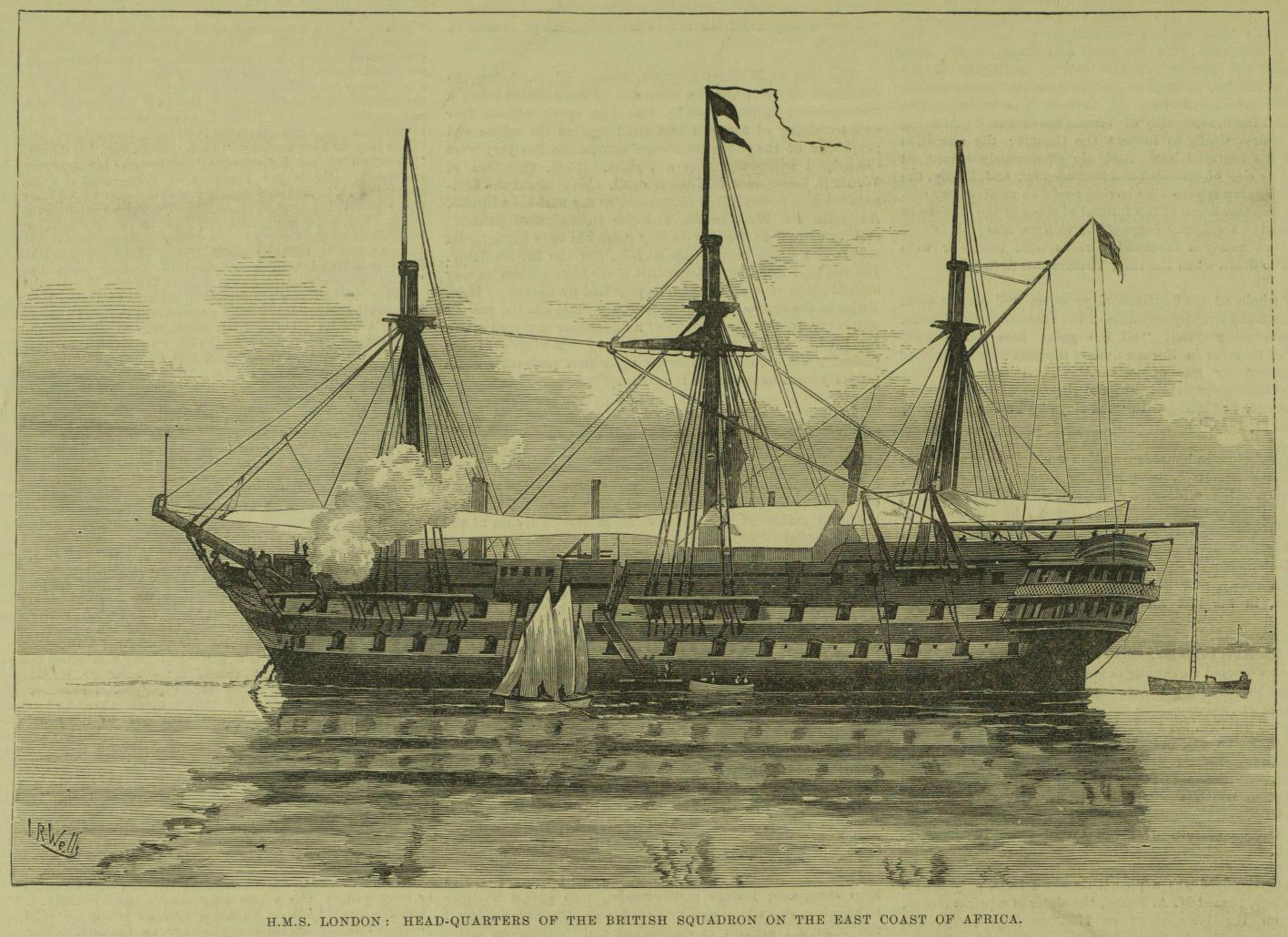
- A drawing of HMS London in 1881

Class overview
- Name: Rodney
- Operators: Royal Navy
- Preceded by: Boyne class
- Succeeded by: Albion class
- Built: 1827–1841
- In service: 1835–1956
- In commission: 1835–1882
- Completed: 3

General characteristics (as initially built)
- Type: Ship of the line
- Tons burthen: 2,5981/94 bm
- Length: 205 ft 6 in (62.6 m) (gun deck)
- Beam: 54 ft 5 in (16.6 m)
- Depth of hold: 23 ft (7.0 m)
- Sail plan: Full-rigged ship
- Complement: 720 officers and ratings (peacetime)
- Armament: All muzzle-loading, smoothbore guns; Lower gun deck: 32 × 32 pdr guns, 2 × 8 in (203 mm) shell guns; Upper gun deck: 32 × 32 pdr guns, 2 × 8 in shell guns; Forecastle & Quarterdeck: 24 × 32 pdr guns

General characteristics (London, as converted)
- Tons burthen: 2,687 bm
- Length: 213 ft 3 in (65.0 m) (gun deck)
- Beam: 54 ft 3 in (16.5 m)
- Depth of hold: 22 ft 7 in (6.9 m)
- Installed power: Boilers; 1,804 ihp (1,345 kW)
- Propulsion: 1 shaft; 1 HRCR steam engine
- Speed: 11.5 knots (21.3 km/h; 13.2 mph)
- Complement: 850
- Armament: Lower gun deck: 14 × 32 pdr guns, 18 × 8 in shell guns; Upper gun deck: 28 × 32 pdr guns, 6 × 8 in shell guns; Forecastle & Quarterdeck: 24 × 32 pdr guns, 1 × 68 pdr gun

The Rodney class consisted of a trio of 90-gun, second-rate ships of the line built for the Royal Navy during the 1830s: Rodney, Nile and London. All three ships saw extensive time in reserve, or "in ordinary" as the RN termed it, during their careers. Rodney was the only ship to see active service and played a minor role in the Oriental Crisis of 1840 before the sister ships received steam engines during the 1850s and participated in the Crimean War of 1854–1856. Nile was the first of the sisters to be converted to steam and was assigned to blockade duties with the Baltic Fleet during the war. Rodney and London participated in the Siege of Sevastopol and both were damaged when bombarding the city's coastal fortifications in 1854.

The latter ship was converted shortly after the war ended and Rodney followed in 1859. Nile and Rodney served as flagships abroad while London was assigned to the Mediterranean Fleet before they were relegated to secondary duties. The latter became the last wooden ship of the line to serve on active duty when she returned home in 1870. London became a depot ship in Zanzibar in 1874; Nile was renamed as Conway in 1876 and converted into a training ship in Liverpool. Rodney was broken up for scrap in 1882 and London followed two years later. Conway was the last surviving steam-powered ship of the line when she ran aground while under tow in 1953 and was accidentally burnt afterwards.

== Background and description ==
The Rodney-class ships were designed by Sir Robert Seppings, co-Surveyor of the Navy, in response to the American USS Ohio and the French 100-gun Hercule class. They were ordered in November 1826. Admiral Thomas Martin, Comptroller of the Navy, wrote to a colleague a few months later that they were little more than razeed versions of the three-decker Caledonia, a ship whose sailing qualities were widely considered to be "faultless". Seppings, never particularly interested in hull form, retained Caledonia's lines while ensuring that the hull used his structural system of crossed diagonal braces. Naval historian Andrew Lambert considers this a sensible decision that minimized technical risk at a time when Seppings needed to devote time to several other designs. They were originally intended to have the spar deck turned into another gun deck by connecting the forecastle with the quarterdeck and armed with a hundred 32-pounder guns, but the spar deck was removed while under construction in 1828 and a traditional poop was added due to pressure from Martin.

The ships were 205 feet 6 inches (62.6 m) at the gun deck and 170 feet 1 inch (51.8 m) at the keel. The Rodney class had a beam of 54 feet 5 inches (16.6 m), a depth of hold of 23 feet (7.0 m) and measured 2,598 1/94 tons burthen. Their crew numbered 720 in peacetime and 820 in wartime. The ships had the usual three-masted full-ship rig with a sail area of 28,102 square feet (2,610.8 m^{2}).

Captain Charles Napier called Rodney, "a fine warship, but it is not a very superior sailer". That is not supported by experience as the ship proved to be a steady gun platform with a slow roll and was able to make 11.4 knots (21.1 km/h; 13.1 mph) sailing large early during her first deployment to the Mediterranean. Minor modifications in the early 1840s that including raking her masts backwards subsequently reduced her performance. During comparative speed trials in 1845 against other ships of the line, including Canopus, Vanguard, and Albion, Rodney proved to be the fastest in a head sea, but performed less well under other conditions.

The muzzle-loading, smoothbore armament of the Rodney class consisted of thirty-two 32-pounder (63 cwt) guns (Note: "Cwt" is the abbreviation for hundredweight, 63 cwt referring to the weight of the gun.) and two 8-inch (203 mm) (50 cwt) shell guns on the lower gun deck and thirty-two 32-pounder (55 cwt) and two 8-inch (50 cwt) shell guns on the upper gun deck. Between their forecastle and quarterdeck, they carried twenty-four 32-pounder (42 cwt) guns. The ships were later rearmed with twenty-six 32-pounders (56 cwt) and six 8-inch shell guns on the lower gun deck and thirty 32-pounders (56 cwt) and six 8-inch shell guns on the upper deck. The number of guns on the forecastle and quarterdeck increased to twenty-six 32-pounders (42 cwt) guns. These guns made the Rodney-class ships the most powerful warships in the world when designed because they were the first to carry a full array of long guns that were accurate at long range. Without short-range carronades they outgunned French and American ships of the same size at long range.

=== Conversion into screw ships of the line ===
Captain Lord John Hay, Third Naval Lord of the Board of Admiralty, proposed to convert Nile and London into steam-powered ships in 1847 using 700 nominal-horsepower (nhp) engines removed from the incomplete, iron-hulled frigates Vulcan and Simoom, but this was ignored by John Edye, acting Surveyor of the Navy. Edye's inaction was later supported by the new Surveyor, Captain Sir Baldwin Wake Walker.

Completion of the French fast steam-powered, second-rate Napoléon in early 1852 and the French preparations for building more like her caused an invasion scare that prompted the First Derby ministry to authorize a large programme of steam-powered ships of the line to maintain British naval superiority; thus initiating a naval arms race between France and Britain. Walker ordered Nile to be converted in 1852 as part of this programme using a surplus 500 nhp engine. All three of the Rodney-class ships used two-cylinder horizontal engines rated at 500 nhp, although the later engines produced more power. To evaluate the effects of the Nile's fuller hull form on the propeller's efficiency, the least possible alteration to the stern was to be made and the ship was not to be lengthened as was usually done. Completed in 1854, Nile's boilers made enough steam that the engine produced 928 indicated horsepower (692 kW) which gave her a speed of 6.9 knots (12.8 km/h; 7.9 mph) during her sea trials. After her piping was replaced and the ship received new boilers, she reached 8.2 knots (15.2 km/h; 9.4 mph) from 1,247 ihp (930 kW) in 1860. After the conversion Nile measured 2,622 tons burthen.

Based on the experiences gained during the Crimean War, Walker favored converting first- and second-rate ships as they could accommodate the engines and their required coal better than smaller ships. Nile's mediocre performance confirmed that the ships needed to be lengthened and their sterns rebuilt to get the best performance and London was ordered to be converted accordingly in 1856. She was lengthened to 213 feet 3 inches (65 m) which modestly increased her tons burthen to 2,687. Her crew increased to 850 officers and men. The ship reached a speed of 11.5 knots (21.3 km/h; 13.2 mph) during her sea trials in 1858 from 1,804 ihp (1,345 kW), although her masts and stores were not yet fitted. London's conversion was so successful that she served as a model for the subsequent conversions of the five first-rate ships of the broadened Caledonia class and HMS Queen.

The conversion of Rodney was ordered in 1859 and she was slightly longer than London at 214 feet 4 inches (65.3 m). The ship measured 2,739 tons burthen and displaced 3,707 long tons (3,766 t). During her sea trials the following year, Rodney reached 11.5 knots from 2,246 ihp (1,675 kW).

The lower gun deck armament of the converted ships consisted of eighteen 8-inch (65 cwt) shell guns and fourteen 32-pounders (56 cwt). The upper gun deck had six 8-inch shell guns and twenty-eight 32-pounders (56 cwt). The combined armament of the forecastle and quarterdeck totalled twenty-four 32-pounders (42 cwt) and a single 68-pounder (95 cwt) pivot gun.

== Ships ==
Construction data
Ship	Builder	Ordered	Laid down	Launched	Commissioned	Fate
Rodney	HM Dockyard, Pembroke	November 1826	July 1827	18 June 1833	29 August 1835	Sold for scrap, February 1882
Nile	HM Dockyard, Plymouth	November 1826	October 1827	28 June 1839	Completed, 12 August 1839	Burnt, 1956
London	HM Dockyard, Chatham	November 1826	October 1827	28 August 1840	Completed, 25 February 1841	Sold for scrap, 1884

== Service history ==
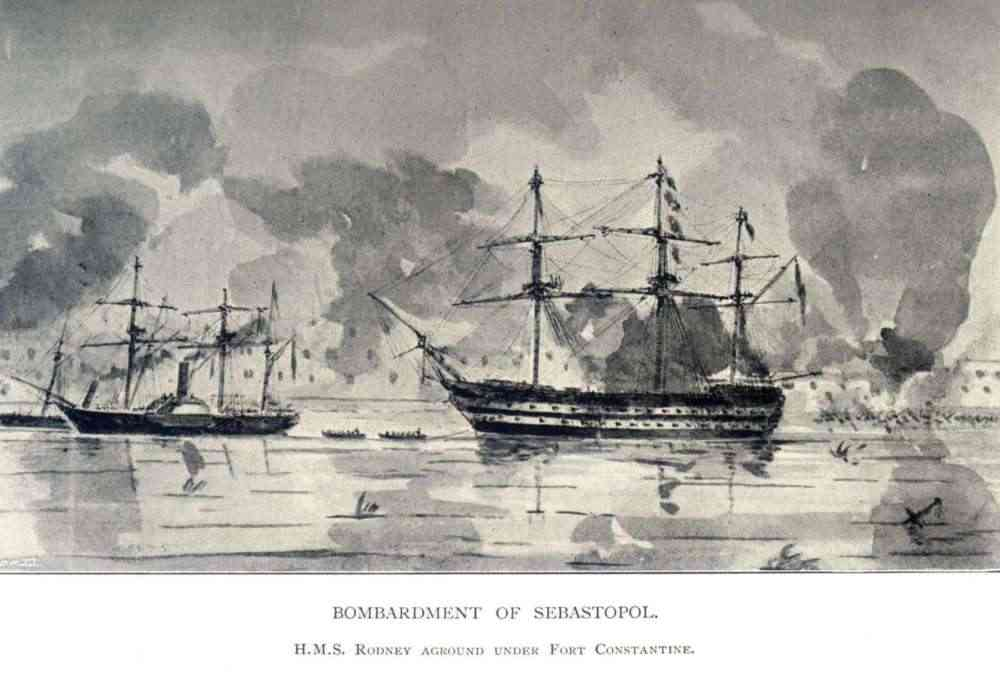
A drawing of Rodney bombarding Fort Constantine

Rodney was commissioned in 1835 for service with the Mediterranean Fleet and served off the coast of Ottoman Syria during the Oriental Crisis of 1840. She returned home in 1843 to be paid off. Rodney was recommissioned two years later and was initially assigned to the Channel Fleet, then the Experimental Squadron where she participated in speed trials. Afterward the ship returned to the Mediterranean where she served until she was paid off in 1849. Rodney recommissioned in 1851 for service with the Mediterranean Fleet, but participated in the naval review at Spithead before departing Britain.

Nile and London were completed in 1839 and 1840, respectively, and were placed in ordinary. The latter ship was commissioned in 1851 as the flagship of Vice-Admiral Josceline Percy, Commander-in-Chief, Sheerness. She remained there until the Crimean War began in 1854.

During the war, all three sisters saw active service. Nile was assigned to the Baltic Fleet that blockaded Russian ports during the war while her sisters saw combat in the Black Sea. Rodney and London contributed sailors to a landing party that assisted Turkish forces at Roustchouk (modern Ruse, Bulgaria), building a pontoon bridge and manning Turkish gunboats on the Danube River, in July–August 1854. The following month, the sisters offloaded some of their 32-pounder guns and their crews to serve as siege artillery during the siege of Sevastopol. They also contributed other crewmen and Royal Marines to the ad-hoc Naval Brigade. Between them, the sisters lost 31 men killed and 128 wounded of these men serving ashore.

During the naval bombardment on 17 October, Rodney was towed into the line of ships about 1,600 to 1,800 yards (1,500 to 1,600 m) away from Fort Constantine while London was assigned to the advanced squadron that closed to 1,000 yards (910 m). Once the bombardment began the British ships were frequently struck by Russian shells; London was forced to withdraw with four men killed and 18 wounded after having been set afire by red-hot shot three times in two hours. Rodney was towed forward to divert fire away from the damaged ships and ran aground in the narrow channel, but was not significantly damaged, although two crewmen were wounded. Four weeks later, London was badly damaged during a severe storm that struck the fleet's anchorage on 14 November.

The sisters were withdrawn to the Mediterranean on 22 November and remained there until they ferried troops from the Crimea back to Britain at the beginning of 1856. Rodney briefly became a depot ship later that year before paying off in August; she began her conversion to steam power in early 1859. Upon its completion she was placed in reserve. The ship was recommissioned in 1867 to serve as the flagship of Vice-Admiral Henry Keppel, Commander-in-Chief, China. She returned home in April 1870, the last wooden ship of the line to have been in full commission, and was paid off. Rodney was sold for scrap in 1882.

London was paid off as well in August 1856 and began her conversion to steam power at the beginning of 1857. The ship was assigned to the Mediterranean Fleet when her conversion was completed in 1859. She was paid off upon her return home in early 1863 and placed in ordinary. London became the depot ship at Zanzibar from 1874 to 1884 and was broken up there that last year.

Nile was present during the naval review held in Spithead in early 1856 and was briefly assigned to the North America and West Indies Station later that year. She returned home in early 1857 and was refitted to serve as the flagship of Rear-Admiral Henry Ducie Chads, at Queenstown (modern Cobh), Ireland, through the beginning of 1857. Rear-Admiral Charles Talbot relieved Chads at the end of 1858. The ship became the flagship of Rear-Admiral Sir Alexander Milne, Commander-in-Chief, North America and West Indies Station, at the end of 1859 and continued that duty until her return home in early 1864. Nile was paid off shortly afterwards and remained in ordinary until 1875. The ship was renamed Conway in 1876 and had her engines removed to serve as a training ship for the Mercantile Marine Service Association at Rock Ferry, Liverpool. During the Second World War she was towed for safety to Anglesey Island in 1940. The ship ran aground in the Menai Straits while being towed to Birkenhead for a refit in 1953. Her wreck was accidentally burnt five months later, "the last survivor of the wooden steam battlefleet".

== Bibliography ==
- Brown, David K. (2015) [1990]. Before the Ironclad: Warship Design and Development 1815–1860. Naval Institute Press. ISBN 978-1-59114-605-6.
- Duckers, Peter (2011) The Crimean War at Sea: The Naval Campaigns against Russia, 1854-56. Pen & Sword Maritime. ISBN 1-84884-267-8.
- Lavery, Brian (1989). Nelson's Navy: The Ships, Men and Organisation 1793-1815. Conway Maritime Press. ISBN 0-85177-521-7.
- Lavery, Brian (1984). The Ship of the Line. Vol. 1: The Development of the Battlefleet 1650-1850. Naval Institute Press. ISBN 0-85177-252-8.
- Lambert, Andrew D. (1984). Battleships in Transition: The Creation of the Steam Battlefleet 1815-1860. Conway Maritime Press. ISBN 0-85177-315-X.
- Lambert, Andrew D. (1991). The Last Sailing Battlefleet: Maintaining Naval Mastery 1815–1850. Conway Maritime Press. ISBN 0-85117-591-8.
- Winfield, Rif (2014). British Warships in the Age of Sail 1817–1863: Design, Construction, Careers and Fates. Seaforth Publishing. ISBN 978-1-84832-169-4.
