= HMS Maeander (1840) =

Frigate of the Royal Navy

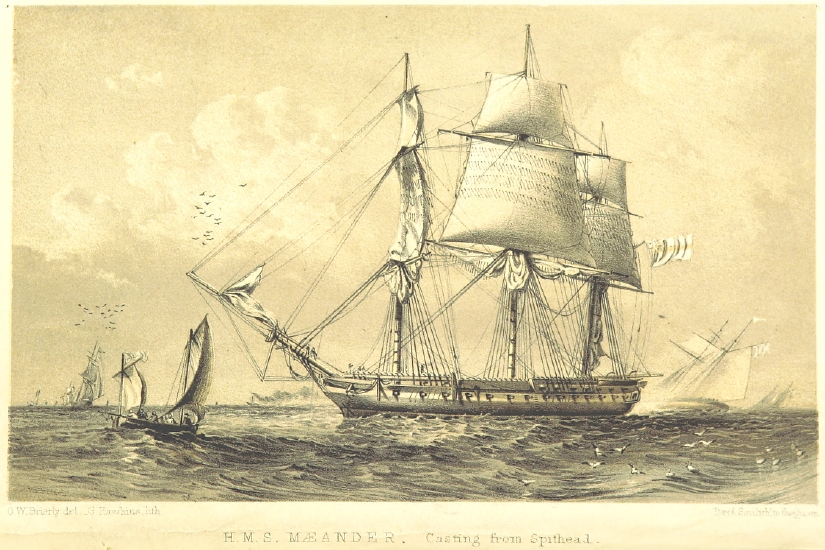
- HMS Maeander (c1850) by Oswald Walters Brierly

History

United Kingdom
- Name: HMS Maeander
- Namesake: Maeander
- Ordered: 13 September 1824
- Builder: Chatham Dockyard
- Laid down: February 1829
- Launched: 5 May 1840
- Completed: 17 January 1848
- Fate: Hulked 1857. Wrecked at Ascension in July 1870.

General characteristics
- Class & type: Seringapatam-class frigate
- Tons burthen: 1,221 bm
- Length: 133 ft (41 m) (keel)
- Beam: 42 ft 5 in (12.93 m)
- Propulsion: Sail
- Sail plan: Full-rigged ship
- Complement: 321 (222 seamen, 39 boys and 60 marines)
- Armament: 16 × 32-pounder carronades; 28 × 18-pounder carronades

HMS Maeander was a Seringapatam-class sailing frigate of the British Royal Navy. Her service included the suppression of piracy, the Crimean War, and support for the suppression of slavery with the West Africa Squadron. She was wrecked in a gale in 1870.

== Career ==
Maeander was launched at Chatham Dockyard on 5 May 1840. From 1 November 1847 to 1851 her captain was Henry Keppel.

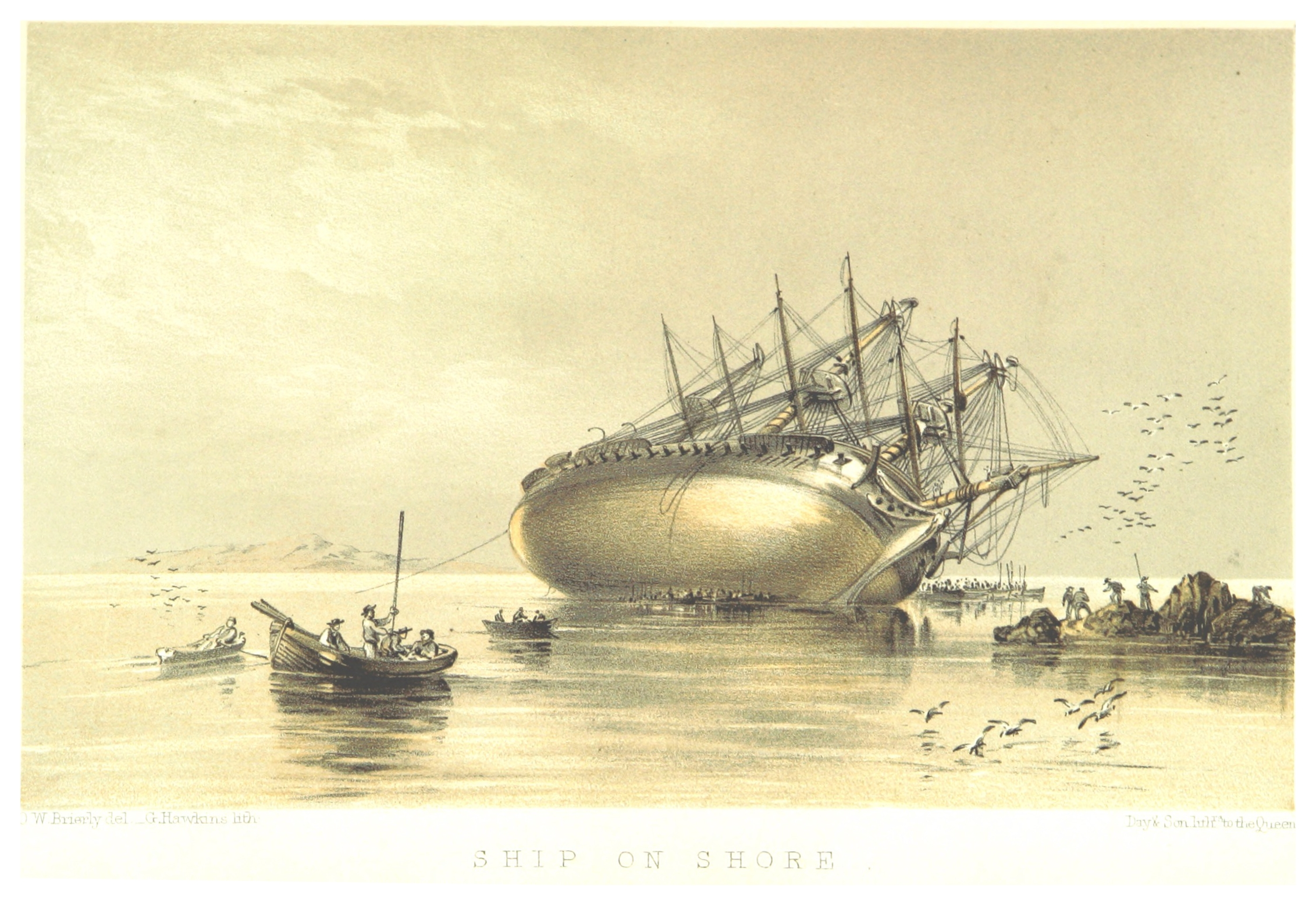
Ship on shore

Maeander served in the East Indies, cooperating with James Brooke in the suppression of piracy. Next, in September 1849 she sailed from Singapore via Batavia for Australia, New Zealand, and the Pacific coast of America; United States Army Lieutenant George H. Derby, in his "Report of the Expedition of the U.S. Transport Invincible" notes that Keppel with the Maeander was in the Mexican port of Guaymas on 5 February 1851. After twelve months on the Valparaiso station, Maeander then returned to Britain with $860,000 in bullion via the Straits of Magellan. (At the time she was thought to have been the largest vessel to have passed through the straits.) She was in the straits for over nine days in May 1851, anchoring every night because of the difficulty of the passage).

On 14 July 1852 Captain Charles Talbot took command of Maeander. On 30 May 1854 Captain Thomas Baillie took command. She served in the White Sea in 1855 during the Crimean War.

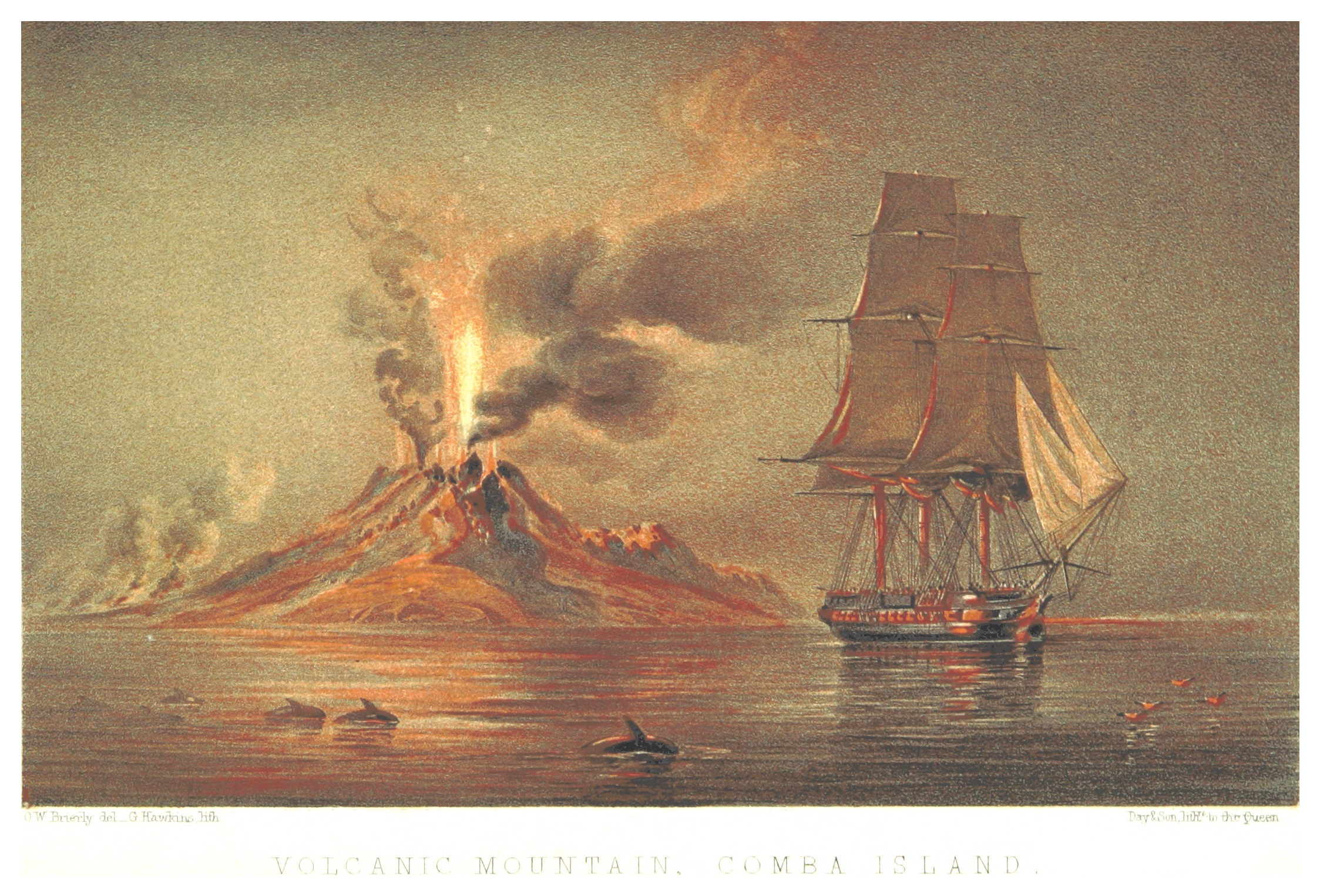
Observing a volcanic eruption in the Indonesian seas (October 1849)

On 2 December 1856, James Robert Drummond was appointed captain of Maeander, for coast guard service. George Fowler Hastings succeeded Drummond. In September 1857 an advertisement seeking a 'seaman schoolmaster' to instruct the boys of the Maeander in the 3Rs. was placed in the name of 'Captain the Hon. G F Hastings CB'.

Hastings was appointed superintendent of Haslar Hospital in January 1858. In 1859 Commander Malcolm MacGregor assumed command of Maeander.

In 1860 her armament was reduced to ten guns as part of her conversion into a storeship. She then joined the West Africa Squadron at Ascension Island as a replacement for Tortoise.

From 1 November 1859 to July 1861 Maeander was under the command of Captain William Farquharson Burnett. On 23 February 1861 Captain Frederick Lamport Barnard took command. From 24 December 1864 to January 1866 her commander was Captain Joseph Grant Bickford.

== Fate ==
In July 1870 Maeander was wrecked in a gale in the South Atlantic Ocean off Ascension Island. Her remains are at a depth of 14 metres (46 feet) in position 07°54′45″S 14°24′24″W, bows on to the shore. She lies on her port side and has opened up. Timber, copper sheathing, knees supporting her gun deck, and her tiller have been located.

== Memorials ==
A memorial tablet to the men of Maeander killed between 1848 and 1851 can be seen at St Ann's Church, HMNB Portsmouth.

A memorial tablet to the Royal Marines from HMS Maeander who died of fever in Labuan (on Borneo) between 14 June and 29 November 1848 can be found in the Old Navy Cemetery within the Botanical Gardens in Labuan, Malaysia.
