= Francis Brooke-Smith =

Recipient of the George Cross

Frances Haffey Brooke-Smith
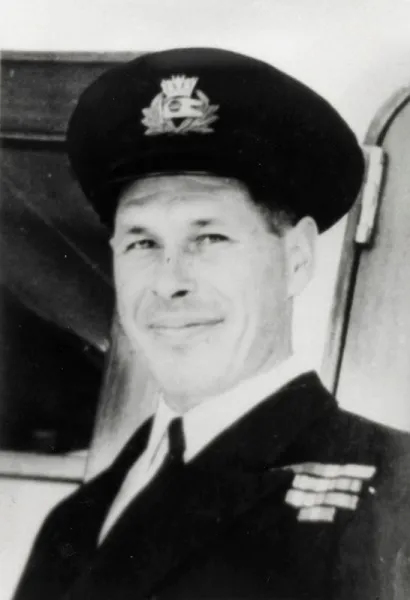
- Brooke-Smith c. 1940
- Born: 21 September 1918; Hasketon, Suffolk
- Died: 3 December 1952 (aged 34); Hasketon, Suffolk
- Burial place: St Andrew Churchyard, Hasketon
- Military career
- Allegiance: United Kingdom
- Branch: Royal Naval Reserve
- Rank: Lieutenant commander
- Unit: HMS President
- Conflicts: Second World War: The Blitz
- Awards: George Cross

Frances Haffey Brooke-Smith, GC (21 September 1918 – 3 December 1952) was Royal Navy Reserve bomb disposal officer awarded the George Cross for "great gallantry and undaunted devotion to duty" while defusing German bombs during the Blitz in 1940.

== Early life ==
Brooke-Smith was born in Hasketon, near Woodbridge, Suffolk. He was a cadet on HMS Conway on the Mersey between 1934 and 1936. A sub-lieutenant in the Royal Naval Reserve, he volunteered for Royal Naval service at the outbreak of the Second World War.

== Second World War ==
His early service included mine disposal. In December 1940, having previously defused 16 mines, a mine fell on the fire-float Firefly in the Manchester Ship Canal, landing inside the deck locker alongside the engine-room. It failed to explode.

When Sub-Lieutenant Brooke-Smith arrived to deal with it, he found it was firmly wedged, but by using a rope he was able to pull the mine slightly clear of the engine-room casing and then, lying on the sloping engine casing, head downwards, he managed to place a safety gag in the bomb-fuse. The clock of the fuse then started to tick, but he stayed where he was and finally managed to stop it before the inevitable explosion occurred. He had dealt successfully with many unexploded bombs, but this was the first time that he had used a safety gag on a bomb-fuse and he had to do so in most difficult circumstances as he was compelled to work by touch, without being able to see the bomb fuse at all, and his chances of succeeding and of escaping with his life were regarded as very small.

For his bravery he was awarded the George Cross, which was announced in the London Gazette on 27 June 1941. He also dealt with a mine in allotments 50 yards from Short & Masons aircraft factory in Macdonald Rd, London.

=== HMS Broadwater ===
He was subsequently assigned to Atlantic convoy escort duties. Early in the morning of 17 October 1941, HMS Broadwater, the ship he was serving on, attacked a U-boat, and 24 hours later, herself fell victim to U-101 while escorting Convoy SC 48. She sank later that day. When another ship came to rescue the survivors there were some thirty men on board, although the exact number could not be determined at the time. Sub-Lieutenant Brooke-Smith, in charge of the torpedoed ship, signalled that twelve men and himself would remain on board until daylight, all the injured having been taken off.

In view, however, of the rapidly increasing sea and wind as daylight came, and also the danger of Broadwater breaking up, as the engineer officer reported that her decks and plates were cracking abaft the fourth funnel and an increasing amount of wreckage was by this time breaking loose from the forward part, it was necessary to give orders for the remainder to abandon ship as soon as possible. The Navy held a Board of Inquiry in Derry, Northern Ireland, where survivors gave evidence.

One report, stamped Secret, gives a graphic account of the action and subsequent bravery of the crew. Lieutenant Commander WM Astwood, the Broadwater's skipper, later said:

The bow and upper bridge were blown off and, at the same time, a torpedo was seen to pass astern of the ship by the 12-pounder gun crew. I was asleep in the chart house at the time and the first thing I remember was the coxswain reporting to me that the forepart of the ship had been blown away. As I sustained head injuries, my memories of succeeding events are in rather a hazy state. On inspection, the following state of the ship was found: From the bow to the after-hatch of the forward seamen's mess deck was completely gone, as was the structure above it, which contained the wardroom and officers cabins. The upper bridge was blown away, except for the hotchkiss [machine gun] mounting. The mast was snapped and had fallen aft. The front of the wheelhouse had completely gone but the wheel was still standing. A considerable amount of the wreckage of the bridge and forepart of the ship was found on the gundeck.

Astwood said the ship's back was probably broken and the ship appeared to be sinking slowly. He added:

HM trawlers Cape Warwick and Angle now appeared to be standing by. As I was becoming more weak and useless, I turned over [command] to the navigating officer [Sub Lt Brooke-Smith], the only surviving executive officer, to carry out the ferrying of survivors to the trawlers. Work carried out by the trawlers' small boats was most praiseworthy considering the weather prevailing. The evacuation was finally completed at 9.45am. Seeing the chances of salvage were nil, I asked Cape Warwick to sink her with gunfire.

Ashwood said the general behaviour of the ship's company was excellent. Sadly, at the time HMS Broadwater was torpedoed there were on board 11 survivors from two other vessels sunk by German submarines. After cheating death once, all perished. A total of 45 members of the crew died in the incident. Sub Lieutenant Brooke-Smith, the Broadwater's navigating officer, was specially commended for destroying all confidential books and ensuring the safe evacuation of survivors, most of whom were covered in oil.

== Post-war career ==
After the war he was a senior officer in passenger lines between New York and Bermuda. He also participated in training divers for Suez Canal clearance. He was killed in a road accident near his home in Woodbridge on 3 December 1952, aged just 34. He is buried at the Hasketon Churchyard.

== Medals ==
Brooke-Smith's George Cross and other medals are on display at the Imperial War Museum in London.
