= HMS Vestal (1833) =

Frigate of the Royal Navy

History

United Kingdom
- Name: HMS Vestal
- Namesake: Vesta (mythology)
- Ordered: 9 November 1831
- Builder: Sheerness Dockyard
- Cost: £19,173 (£27,508 fitted)
- Laid down: May 1832
- Launched: 6 April 1833
- Completed: By 15 July 1833
- Fate: Sold for breaking up by order dated 17 February 1862

General characteristics
- Class & type: Vestal-class sixth-rate frigate
- Tons burthen: 911 75/94 (bm)
- Length: 130 ft (39.6 m) (gundeck); 104 ft 6 in (31.9 m) (keel)
- Beam: 40 ft 6 in (12.3 m)
- Depth of hold: 10 ft 6 in (3.2 m)
- Sail plan: Full-rigged ship
- Complement: 240
- Armament: Upper deck: 18 × 32-pounder guns; Quarterdeck: 6 × 32-pounder gunnades; Forecastle: 2 × 32-pounder gunnades

HMS Vestal was a 26-gun Vestal-class sixth-rate frigate of the Royal Navy. She was built to a design by Sir William Symonds and was launched in 1833.

On her maiden voyage, she departed for the West Indies on 19 October 1833, and arrived in Barbados on 3 December of that year. In October 1835, Vestal seized the Spanish slave ship Amalia. This was to a regular part of her Caribbean duties. During 1838 and 1839, she was in Havana protecting British interests off the coast of Mexico. During the following years she visited Canada, Jamaica, the United States, Argentina and Tasmania.

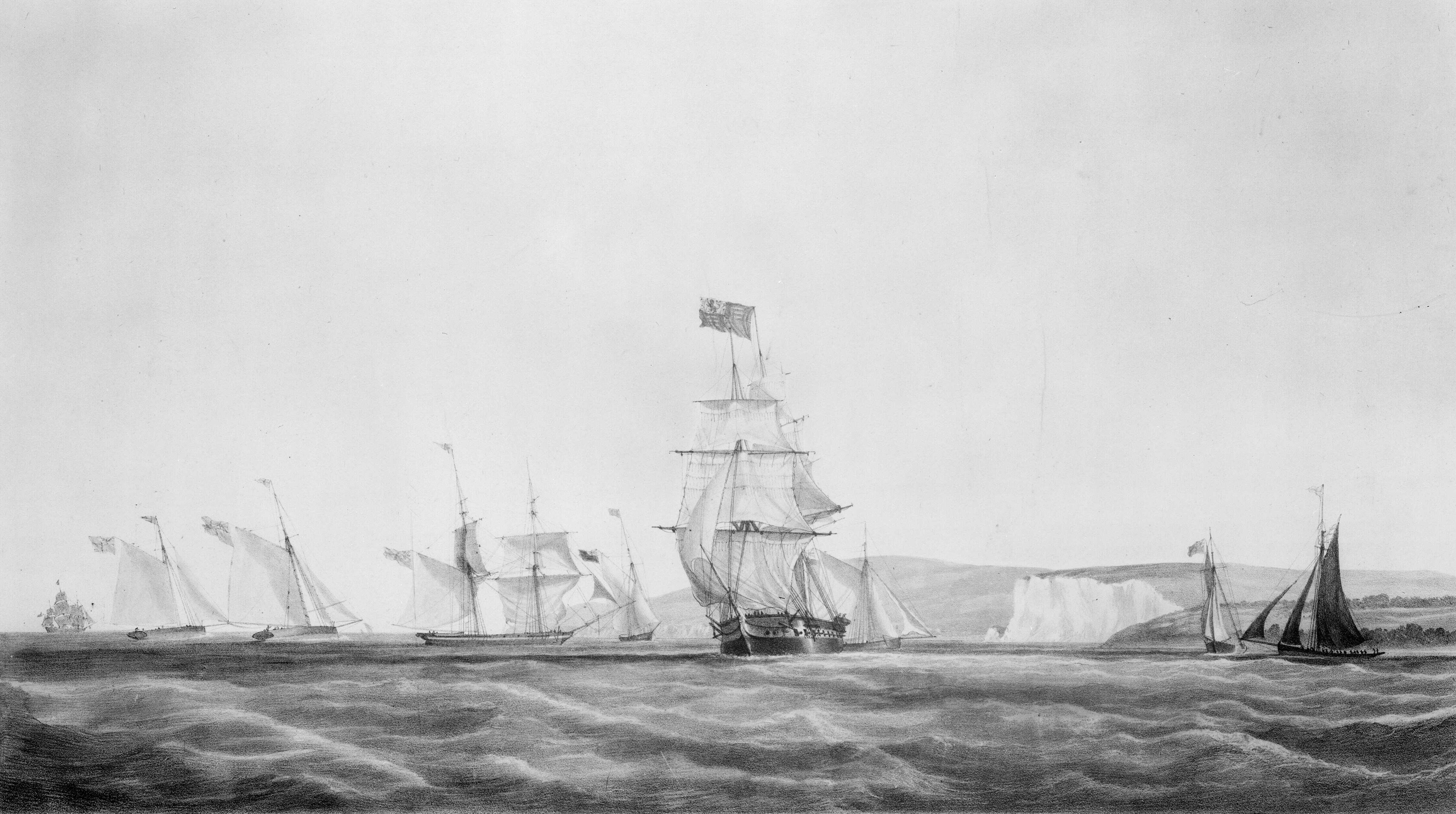
His Majesty's Ship the Vestal frigate, commanded by Captain William Jones. Having their Royal Highnesses the Duchess of Kent and the Princess Victoria on board, off Culver Cliffs on 24 July 1833

On 26 August 1852, Vestal ran aground on the Hemstead Ledge, west of The Needles, Isle of Wight whilst on a voyage from Portsmouth, Hampshire to the West Indies. After throwing her guns overboard, she was refloated and taken back to Portsmouth for inspection and repair. She was decommissioned in 1860; and broken up in 1862.
