= Charles Talbot (Royal Navy officer) =

Royal Navy Admiral (1801–1876)

Admiral Sir Charles Talbot KCB
- Born: 1 November 1801
- Died: 8 August 1876 (aged 74)
- Military career
- Allegiance: United Kingdom
- Branch: Royal Navy
- Rank: Admiral
- Commands: HMS Warspite; HMS Vestal; HMS Maeander; HMS Algiers; Queenstown; Nore Command
- Awards: Knight Commander of the Order of the Bath

Admiral Sir Charles Talbot KCB (1 November 1801 – 8 August 1876) was a Royal Navy officer who went on to be Commander-in-Chief, The Nore.

== Naval career ==
Talbot was the second son of the Rev. Charles Talbot, and Lady Elizabeth Somerset, daughter of Henry Somerset, 5th Duke of Beaufort. He joined the Royal Navy as a cadet in 1815. Promoted to captain in 1830, he commanded HMS Warspite, HMS Vestal, HMS Maeander and then HMS Algiers. He was appointed Commander-in-chief, Queenstown in 1858 and Commander-in-Chief, The Nore in 1864.

He presented a stained glass window to All Saints Church, Down Ampney, Gloucestershire in appreciation after his ship survived a storm off Sebastopol in 1854.

He was appointed a Knight Commander of the Order of the Bath (KCB) in 1862.

There is a memorial window to him and his wife in the church of St. John the Baptist in Biggleswade.

== Family ==
In 1838 he married Hon. Charlotte Georgiana Ponsonby; they had three sons and four daughters.

== See also ==
- O'Byrne, William Richard (1849). "Talbot, Charles" . A Naval Biographical Dictionary . John Murray – via Wikisource.

Military offices
Preceded by Henry Chads	Commander-in-Chief, Queenstown; 1858–1862	Succeeded by Sir Lewis Jones
Preceded by Sir George Lambert	Commander-in-Chief, The Nore; 1864–1866	Succeeded by Sir Baldwin Walker
