= Henry Ducie Chads =

Royal Navy Admiral (1788–1868)

Admiral Sir Henry Ducie Chads GCB
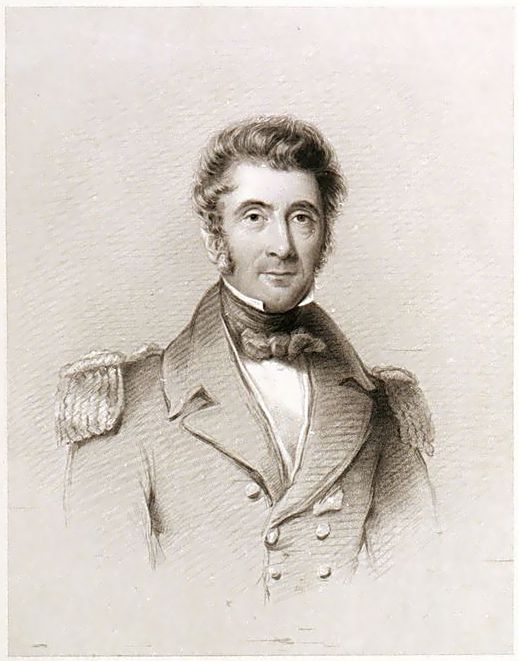
- Born: 24 February 1788; Marylebone, London, England
- Died: 7 April 1868 (aged 80); Southsea, Hampshire, England
- Military career
- Allegiance: United Kingdom
- Branch: Royal Navy
- Rank: Admiral
- Commands: HMS Andromache; HMS Cambrian; HMS Excellent
- Conflicts: War of 1812; First Anglo-Burmese War; Crimean War
- Awards: Knight Grand Cross of the Order of the Bath

Admiral Sir Henry Ducie Chads, GCB (24 February 1788 – 7 April 1868) was an officer in the Royal Navy who saw action from the Napoleonic Wars to the Crimean War.

== Family background ==
Chads was born in Marylebone, London, the eldest son of Captain Henry Chads, R.N. (died on 20 October 1799) and his wife, Susannah. He was baptised at three weeks old at St Marylebone Parish Church. He was the brother of Lieutenant-colonel John Cowell Chads, who died, President of the British Virgin Islands at Tortola on 28 February 1854, aged 60.

== Career ==
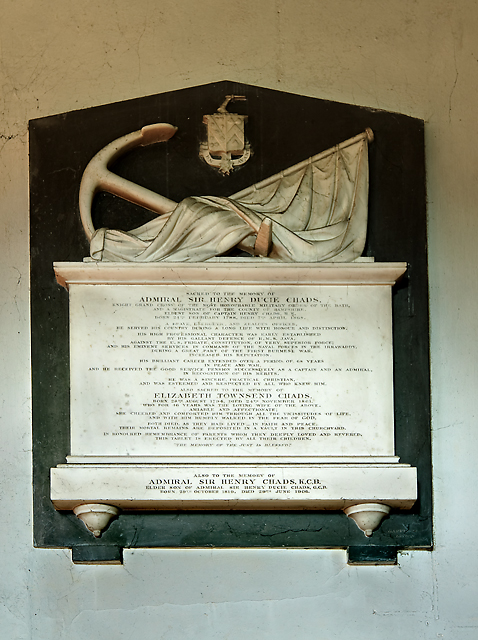
Monument in Fareham church

Chads entered the Royal Naval Academy in Portsmouth as a 12-year-old on 25 October 1800, and in 1803 embarked aboard the 74-gun ship of the line HMS Excellent, sharing in the defence of Gaeta and the capture of Capri. In July 1808, he joined the 36-gun frigate HMS Iphigenia and during the Mauritius campaign distinguished himself at the occupation of the Île de la Passe, gateway to the Isle de France (now Mauritius). On the defeat of the British squadron by the French, he was made prisoner, but was rescued from captivity when the British captured Mauritius, and re-appointed first lieutenant of Iphigenia.

In December 1812, as senior Lieutenant of the frigate HMS Java, he distinguished himself in the battle between that ship and the American frigate Constitution. Captain Lambert having been mortally wounded, Chads (himself severely wounded) continued the struggle, until compelled to surrender after nearly four hours' fighting. This action secured promotion and the command of the sloop Columbia. Chads afterwards served at Guadeloupe in 1815. In 1823, he was prominent in the expedition against Rangoon, as a result of which he was made post-captain on 25 July 1825, created a Companion of the Bath, and received the thanks of the Government of India, and praise in the British House of Commons. He was next engaged in forcing the passage of the Bocca Tigris prior to the First Opium War in September 1834, aboard HMS Andromache, which he commanded from 1834 to 1837.

In 1841-5 he was on the Chinese station in command of HMS Cambrian, and then commanded the Royal Navy's gunnery school HMS Excellent. Chads reformed the whole system of naval gunnery, both as regards weight of metal and rapidity of fire. He was promoted to rear-admiral on 12 January 1854 and, flying his flag in HMS Edinburgh, was third in command of the fleet sent to the Baltic under Sir Charles Napier, who claimed that Chads 'knew more about gunnery than any man in the service'. He was one of the leaders in the bombardment and capture of the fortress of Bomarsund. He struck his flag in 1855, and as a reward for his services was created a Knight Commander of the Bath. From 1856 to the end of 1858, he was Commander-in-Chief, Queenstown, being promoted to vice-admiral on 24 November 1858, and then to full admiral on 3 December 1863. In 1865 he was created Knight Grand Cross of the Bath.

== In literature ==
Chads makes a brief appearance, in his heroic role as First Lieutenant of the Java, in the novel The Fortune of War by Patrick O'Brian.

Military offices
Preceded by George Sartorius	Commander-in-Chief, Queenstown; 1856–1858	Succeeded by Charles Talbot
