= Caldwell (surname) =

Caldwell is a surname of English, Scottish and Northern Irish origin meaning "cold-stream". Notable people with the surname include:

== People ==
=== A ===
- Abel Payne Caldwell (1865–1917), American journalist, newspaper publisher, and editor
- Alastair Caldwell (born 1943) British Formula One motor-racing team manager
- Alexander Caldwell (1830–1917), American politician from Kansas
- Alexander Caldwell (Virginia judge) (1774–1839), American federal judge from Virginia
- Alfred Caldwell (1903–1998), American landscape architect
- Andre Caldwell (born 1985), American football player
- Andrew Caldwell (disambiguation), multiple people
- Anne Caldwell (1868–1936), American librettist
- Arthur Caldwell (disambiguation), multiple people

=== B ===
- Ben Caldwell (disambiguation), multiple people
- Billy Caldwell (1782–1841), also known as Sauganash, Potawatomi-British settler near Chicago
- Blake Caldwell (born 1984), American road bicycle racer
- Bobby Caldwell (1951–2023), American singer-songwriter
- Bobby Caldwell (drummer), American rock drummer
- Bruce Caldwell (disambiguation), multiple people
- Buddy Caldwell (born 1946), American politician and lawyer from Louisiana

=== C ===
- Cecil Caldwell (born 1977), American football player
- Charles Caldwell (disambiguation), multiple people
- C. Pope Caldwell (1875–1940), American Representative from New York
- Christopher Caldwell (journalist) (born 1962), American journalist
- Clive Caldwell (1910–1994), Australian fighter ace
- Clyde Caldwell, American illustrator
- Colbert Caldwell (1822–1892), Justice of the Texas Supreme Court
- Columbus Caldwell (1830–1908), American politician
- Craig Caldwell (born 1973), New Zealand darts player

=== D ===
- Daniel Caldwell (1935–2015), American actor, stage director and teacher
- Daniel G. Caldwell (1842–1917), American Civil War soldier
- David Caldwell (disambiguation), multiple people
- Drew Caldwell (born 1960), Canadian politician from Manitoba

=== E ===
- Edmund Caldwell (1852–1930), English animal artist
- Emma Caldwell (1978–2005), Scottish murder victim
- Erskine Caldwell (1903–1987), American writer

=== F ===
- Francis Caldwell (c. 1860–1934), British police officer
- Francis Xavier Caldwell (1792–1851), historical figure from Upper Canada
- Frank Merrill Caldwell (1866–1937), United States Army officer
- Frederick Caldwell, lieutenant general in the Portuguese Army during the Peninsular War, father of Marshal John Frederick Caldwell
- Frederick Heath-Caldwell (1858–1945), British Army officer and RAF general

=== G ===
- Gail Caldwell (born 1951), American critic
- Gary Caldwell (born 1982), Scottish footballer
- George Caldwell (disambiguation), multiple people
- Greene Washington Caldwell (1806–1864), American Representative from North Carolina

=== H ===
- Harmon White Caldwell (1899–1977), American university president
- Henry Caldwell (disambiguation)
- Herschel Caldwell (1903–1989) American college football player and coach
- H. H. Caldwell (1873–1939), American submarine captain

=== I ===
- Ian Caldwell (born 1976), American writer
- Isaac Caldwell (1795–1836), Justice of the Supreme Court of Mississippi
- Isaac Caldwell (died 1885) (1825–1885), American lawyer and educator

=== J ===
- Jamaree Caldwell (born 2000), American football player
- James Caldwell (disambiguation), multiple people
- Jarvis Caldwell, American politician from Colorado
- Joe Caldwell (born 1941), American basketball player
- Joe Caldwell (archaeologist) (1916–1973), American archaeologist
- John Caldwell (disambiguation), multiple people
- Joseph Caldwell (1773–1835), American mathematician
- Joseph Pearson Caldwell (1808–1853), American representative from North Carolina

=== K ===
- Karen K. Caldwell (born 1956), Chief United States District Judge for the Eastern District of Kentucky
- Keith Caldwell (1895–1980), New Zealand flying ace
- Kimberly Caldwell (born 1982), American television host
- Kirk Caldwell (born 1952), American politician; mayor of Honolulu, Hawaii
- Knute Cauldwell (1896–1952), American football player

=== L ===
- Lewis A. H. Caldwell (1905–1993), American politician
- L. Jay Caldwell (1871–1950), American football player and coach
- Lynton K. Caldwell (1913–2006), American political scientist

=== M ===
- Malcolm Caldwell (1931–1978), British Marxist academic
- Mathew Caldwell (1798–1842), Texas settler and military figure
- Matt Caldwell (born 1981), American politician from Florida
- Maya Caldwell (born 1998), American basketball player
- Michael Caldwell (born 1989), American politician from Georgia
- Mike Caldwell (disambiguation), multiple people
- Millard F. Caldwell (1897–1984), American politician from Florida
- Minerva Ruffin Cain Caldwell (1820–1890), American political hostess

=== N ===
- Nadene Caldwell (born 1991), Northern Irish footballer
- Nancy Abbate Caldwell (born 1941/1942), American entertainer and dance teacher
- Nancy Melvina Caldwell (1868–1956), American schoolteacher and politician
- Nat Caldwell (1912–1985), American journalist
- Neil Caldwell (footballer) (born 1975), Scottish footballer
- Neil Caldwell (politician) (1929–2018), American politician
- Nick Caldwell, American technology executive
- Nicholas Caldwell (1944–2016), American R&B singer, original member of The Whispers

=== O ===
- Oliver Caldwell (architect) (1862–1910), British architect
- Olli Caldwell (born 2002), British racing driver
- Orestes H. Caldwell (1888–1967), American government official (1888-1967)
- Orval Caldwell (1895–1972), American painter
- Orville Caldwell (1896–1967), American actor
- Otis Caldwell (1869–1947), American botanist, college football coach and science writer

=== P ===
- Patrick Caldwell (skier) (born 1994), American cross-country skier
- Patrick C. Caldwell (1801–1855), American politician
- Peter Christopher Caldwell (1927–1979), British zoologist
- Philip Caldwell (1920–2013), American businessman
- Phoebe Caldwell (born 1933), Autism researcher

=== R ===
- Ralph Caldwell (1884–1969), American baseball pitcher
- Ravin Caldwell (born 1963), American football linebacker
- Ray Caldwell (1888–1967), American baseball pitcher
- Reche Caldwell (born 1979), American football player
- Robert Caldwell (disambiguation), multiple people
- Rogers Caldwell (1890–1968), American businessman and banker from Tennessee
- Ron Caldwell (born 1951), American politician from Arkansas
- Ronnie Caldwell (1948–1967), American musician
- Ross Caldwell (born 1993), Scottish footballer
- Ryan Caldwell (born 1981), Canadian ice hockey player

=== S ===
- Sam Caldwell (1892–1953), American oilman and Louisiana politician
- Samuel Caldwell (disambiguation), multiple people
- Sara Caldwell (born 1961), American author and screenwriter/filmmaker
- Sarah Caldwell (1924–2006), American opera conductor, impresario and stage director
- Sophie Caldwell (1990), American cross-country skier
- Spence Caldwell (1909–1983), Canadian broadcasting pioneer
- Stephen J. Caldwell (died 1919), American politician from Maryland
- Steven Caldwell (born 1980), Scottish footballer
- Susan Caldwell (born 1958), English chess master

=== T ===
- Talent Caldwell, American comics artist
- Taylor Caldwell (1900–1985), Anglo-American novelist
- Thomas Caldwell (disambiguation), multiple people
- Tod Robinson Caldwell (1818–1874), American politician; governor of North Carolina
- Tracy Caldwell Dyson (born 1969), American astronaut
- Tommy Caldwell (born 1978), American rock climber
- Tommy Caldwell (musician) (1949–1980), bassist/vocalist for The Marshall Tucker Band
- Tom Caldwell (1921–2002), Irish politician, interior designer, and art dealer
- Tony Caldwell (born 1961), American football linebacker
- Toy Caldwell (1947–1993), American musician

=== W ===
- Waller C. Caldwell (1849–1924), associate justice of the Tennessee Supreme Court
- Walter G. Caldwell (1886–1934), American politician
- William Caldwell (disambiguation), multiple people
- Wilson Caldwell (1841–1898), African-American Civil War era community leader

=== Z ===
- Zoe Caldwell (1933–2020), Australian actress

== Fictional characters ==
- Minnie Caldwell, in Coronation Street
- Steven Caldwell (Stargate), in Stargate Atlantis

== See also ==
- Caldwell (disambiguation)
- Caldwell (given name)
- Cauldwell (disambiguation)
- Justice Caldwell (disambiguation)
