= Literally =

Word in the English language

Literally is an English adverb meaning "in a literal sense or manner" or an intensifier which strengthens the associated statement. It has been used as an intensifier in English for several centuries, though since the early 20th century it has been considered somewhat controversial by linguistic prescriptivists. The use of 'literally' as an intensifier is recognized as valid by most dictionaries of English and has been used by authors such as Mark Twain and James Joyce.

== History ==
The first known use of the word literally was in the 16th century, or the 1530s.

The use of the word as an intensifier emerged later, at the latest by 1769, when Frances Brooke wrote the following sentence:

He is a fortunate man to be introduced to such a party of fine women at his arrival; it is literally to feed among the lilies.

— Frances Brooke, The History of Emily Montague

== As an intensifier ==
Despite common perception to the contrary, the use of an intensifier does not mean "figuratively" and is not an auto-antonym; literally as an intensifier cannot be lexically substituted for figuratively while keeping the meaning of the sentence the same, and instead it serves as a generic intensifier. Its use as an intensifier dates back to the 1700s, and only since the early 20th century has its use as an intensifier been controversial. In 1909, the following entry was included in a blacklist of literary faults:

Literally for Figuratively. "The stream was literally alive with fish." "His eloquence literally swept the audience from its feet." It is bad enough to exaggerate, but to affirm the truth of the exaggeration is intolerable.

— Ambrose Bierce, Write it Right: A Little Blacklist of Literary Faults

Opponents state that this usage is contrary to its original meaning, that it is nonsensical for a word to mean two opposite things despite the abundance of such words in languages, that the use of the word literally as an intensifier can be substituted by other words ("absolutely", "definitely", "unquestionably"), and that "it makes the speaker look ridiculous". Paul Brians stated in Common Errors in English Usage: "Don't say of someone that he 'literally blew up' unless he swallows a stick of dynamite." The notion that its use as an intensifier is an "error" is rejected by scholars of language, who typically view arguments against the use of literally as an intensifier as either an etymological fallacy or fundamental misunderstanding of how languages develop.

Proponents state that this usage has been well-attested since the 18th century. The authors of the Merriam Webster dictionary write: "The use of literally in a fashion that is hyperbolic or metaphoric is not new—evidence of this use dates back to 1769" and "the fact that so many people are writing angry letters serves as a sort of secondhand evidence, as they would hardly be complaining about this usage if it had not become common."

== In popular culture ==
In 2014, CollegeHumor made a skit titled "The Boy Who Cried Literally", which parodies the alleged overuse of the word.
