= James Caldwell =

James or Jim Caldwell may refer to:

== Politics ==
- James Caldwell (Ohio politician) (1770–1838), U.S. Representative from Ohio, son of James Caldwell (1724–1804), an Irish emigrant who founded Wheeling, West Virginia
- James Caldwell (Missouri speaker) (1763–1840), first Speaker of the Missouri House of Representatives
- Jim Caldwell (Arkansas politician) (born 1936), former member of the Arkansas State Senate
- Buddy Caldwell (James David Caldwell, Jr., born 1946), American politician and attorney from Louisiana
- James Caldwell (British politician) (1839–1925), Member of Parliament for Glasgow St. Rollox, 1886–1892, and Mid Lanarkshire, 1894–1910
- James Eber Caldwell (born 1943), member of the Canadian House of Commons

== Sports ==
- Jim Caldwell (American football) (born 1955), American football coach
- Jim Caldwell (basketball) (1943–2023), American basketball player
- Jim Caldwell (footballer) (1888–1929), Australian rules footballer and coach
- Jimmy Caldwell (footballer) (1884–?), Scottish footballer

== Other ==
- James Caldwell (clergyman) (1734–1781), Presbyterian "soldier parson" in the American Revolutionary War
  - SS James Caldwell, a Liberty ship
- James Caldwell (Latter Day Saints), dissenting apostle from the Church of Jesus Christ (Bickertonite) who formed the Primitive Church of Jesus Christ
- James Caldwell (died 1770), one of five American colonists killed in the Boston Massacre
- James H. Caldwell (1793–1863), American actor and theatre manager
- James Emmot Caldwell (1813–1881), American jeweler
- James Erwin Caldwell (1854–1944), American businessman and banker from Tennessee
- James F. Caldwell Jr. (born 1959), admiral in the United States Navy
- James R. Caldwell (1778–1804), United States Navy officer
- James Caldwell (mathematician) (born 1943), British mathematician
- Sir James Caldwell, 1st Baronet (by 1634–c. 1717), of the Caldwell baronets
- Sir James Caldwell, 4th Baronet (c. 1720–1784), Anglo-Irish soldier and author
- Jim Caldwell, game show host who emceed Tic-Tac-Dough, 1985–1986, and Top Card, 1989–1993
- James Alexander Malcolm Caldwell (1931–1978), British Marxist writer

== See also ==
- James Caldwell High School, New Jersey, U.S.
- Caldwell (disambiguation)
