= Henry Caldwell (disambiguation) =

Henry Caldwell (c. 1735–1810) was a Canadian army officer.

Henry Caldwell may also refer to:

- Henry Clay Caldwell (1832–1915), United States federal judge and Union Army officer
- Henry John Caldwell (1801–1858), Quebec politician
- Henry M. Caldwell, Mayor of Birmingham, Alabama in 1878
- Sir Henry Caldwell, 2nd Baronet (died c. 1726), of the Caldwell baronets
- Sir Henry John Caldwell, 7th Baronet (1801–1858), of the Caldwell baronets

== See also ==
- John Henry Caldwell, (1826–1902) US Representative from Alabama
- Harry Handley Caldwell, (1873–1939) America's first submarine captain
