= John Caldwell =

John Caldwell may refer to:

== Arts and entertainment ==
- John Caldwell (cartoonist) (1946–2016), American cartoonist
- John Caldwell (musicologist) (born 1938), British composer and Oxford University academic

== Military ==
- Capt. John Caldwell, Revolutionary war soldier, died 1777; see Delaware Blue Hen
- John C. Caldwell (1833–1912), General in the U.S. Army during the Civil War
- John Frederick Caldwell (1801–1873), Marshal in the Imperial Brazilian Army, born in Portugal to an Irish father

== Politics ==
- John Caldwell (Kentucky politician) (1757–1804), Lieutenant Governor of Kentucky, 1804
- John Caldwell (Michigan politician) (1849–1916), Michigan state representative, 1897–1900
- John Caldwell (New South Wales politician) (1817–1884), New South Wales colonial politician
- John Caldwell (Western Australian politician) (1934–2000), Western Australian state politician
- John Caldwell (Mississippi politician), Mississippi Transportation Commissioner
- John Caldwell (seigneur) (1775–1842), Early Quebec seigneur and politician
- John A. Caldwell (1852–1927), U.S. Representative from Ohio
- John Henry Caldwell (1826–1902), U.S. Representative from Alabama
- John Lawrence Caldwell (1875–1922), American ambassador to Iran
- John Taylor Caldwell (1911–2007), Glasgow-born anarchist communist and biographer of Guy Aldred
- John W. Caldwell (1837–1903), U.S. Representative from Kentucky

== Sport ==
- John Caldwell (boxer) (1938–2009), Irish Olympian, bronze medal in 1956 Olympics
- John H. Caldwell (1928–2026), American Nordic skier, coach and author
- Jock Caldwell (John Caldwell, 1874–?), Scottish footballer

== Others ==
- John Caldwell (demographer) (1928–2016), Australian demographer and member of the Order of Australia
- John Tyler Caldwell (1911–1995), Chancellor of North Carolina State University
- John Isaiah Caldwell (c. 1828–?), American attorney, miner, businessman, and school trustee
- John E. Caldwell (born c. 1950), chair of the board of Advanced Micro Devices, Inc.
- John K. Caldwell (1881–1982), American diplomat
- John Caldwell, real name of John Fenwick (Jesuit) (1628–1679), English Jesuit
- John Caldwell (born 1974 or 1975), Northern Irish police officer who was shot in 2023; see shooting of John Caldwell
