= Jamaree =

Jamaree is a masculine given name. Notable people with the name include:

- Jamaree Bouyea (born 1999), American basketball player
- Jamaree Caldwell (born 2000), American football player
- Jamaree Salyer (born 2000), American football player
