= Leopold Heath =

Royal Navy Admiral (1817–1907)

Vice-Admiral Sir Leopold Heath KCB
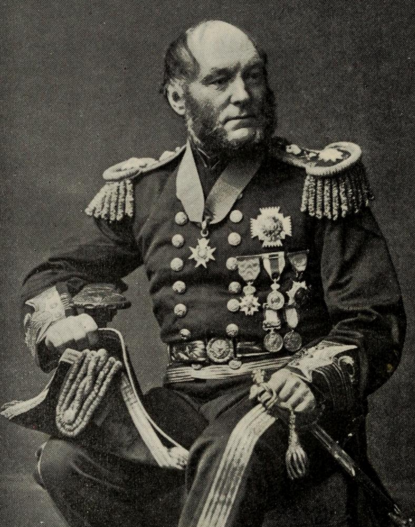
- Heath in 1873
- Born: 18 November 1817; London, England
- Died: 7 May 1907 (aged 89); Holmwood, Surrey, England
- Military career
- Allegiance: United Kingdom
- Branch: Royal Navy
- Service years: 1830–1877
- Rank: Vice-Admiral
- Commands: East Indies Station; HMS Cambridge; HMS Dauntless; HMS Arrogant; HMS Melampus; HMS Seahorse; HMS Sans Pareil
- Conflicts: Crimean War; Expedition to Abyssinia
- Awards: Knight Commander of the Order of the Bath; Legion of Honour (France); Order of the Medjidie (Ottoman Empire)

Vice-Admiral Sir Leopold George Heath, KCB (18 November 1817 – 7 May 1907) was a Royal Navy officer who served as Commander-in-Chief, East Indies Station from 1867 to 1870.

== Naval career ==
Heath joined the Royal Navy in 1830, and was involved in the capture of 'Borneo' in 1846. In 1846, he drew a three-part depiction of the coasts of Hong Kong Island and Kowloon. His drawings were published by the Hydrographer's Office, London, in 1847 as a guide for merchant ships' captains. The series was republished in 1997 to mark the end of the 99-year lease by Britain of Hong Kong's New Territories.

Heath was beachmaster during the British landings at Eupatoria during the Crimean War and then became acting captain of HMS Sans Pareil in the Black Sea before taking personal charge of the Port of Balaclava. He later commanded HMS Seahorse, HMS Melampus, HMS Arrogant, HMS Dauntless and then HMS Cambridge. He was appointed vice-president of the Ordnance Select Committee at Woolwich in 1863 and Commander-in-Chief, East Indies Station in 1867. The following year, he took charge of the naval aspects of the Expedition to Abyssinia. He served on a committee for torpedo defence in 1870 and retired in 1877.

In retirement Heath lived at Anstie Grange in Holmwood, Surrey, where he died. He became a Director of the Hand in Hand Fire & Life Insurance Society, of the Central Bank of London and of the Eastern and South African Telegraph Company.

== Works ==
- Heath, Leopold (1897). Letters from the Black Sea during the Crimean War, 1854–55. R. Bentley.

== Family ==
Heath married Mary Emma Marsh, daughter of Cuthbert Marsh, of Eastbury, Hertfordshire, at St. Paul's Church, Malta, on 8 December 1853. Lady Heath died aged 76 at Anstie Grange, Holmwood, on 20 December 1902. They had seven children:

- Arthur Raymond Heath (1854–1943), a Conservative politician, married Flora Jean Baxter
- Marion Emma (1856–1949), married firstly Alfred Fox Cotton, secondly Major Ralph Martin Crofton
- Frederick Crofton Heath, later Heath-Caldwell (1858–1945), major general in the British Army, married Constance Mary Helsham Helsham-Jones
- Cuthbert Eden Heath (1859–1939), an insurance underwriter, married Sarah Caroline Gore Gambier
- Ada Randolf (1860–1957), married H.J.T. Broadwood (1856–1911)
- Sir Herbert Leopold Heath (1861–1954), admiral in the Royal Navy, married Elizabeth Catherine Simpson
- Sir Gerard Moore Heath (1863–1929), major general in the British Army, married Mary Egerton.

== Sources ==
- Laughton, Leonard George Carr (1912). "Heath, Leopold George" . In Lee, Sidney (ed.). Dictionary of National Biography (2nd supplement). London: Smith, Elder & Co.
- Laughton, L. G. C.; Stearn, Roger T. "Heath, Sir Leopold George (1817–1907)". Oxford Dictionary of National Biography (online ed.). Oxford University Press. doi:10.1093/ref:odnb/33792. (Subscription, Wikipedia Library access or UK public library membership required.)

Military offices
Preceded by Sir Charles Hillyar	Commander-in-Chief, East Indies Station; 1867–1870	Succeeded by James Cockburn
