= SMTC =

SMTC may refer to:

- Santa Monica Track Club, a professional running group
- St. Moritz Tobogganing Club, founder of the Cresta Run toboggan track in Switzerland
- SMTC, the NASDAQ symbol of Semtech, an electronics technology company in California, United States
- SMTC Corporation, an international electronics manufacturing services provider
- Special Missions Training Center, a U.S. military maritime security training center now known as the Joint Maritime Training Center
- Sporadic medullary thyroid cancer, a type of thyroid cancer
- Syndicat mixte des transports en commun, public transportation schemes in Belfort, Clermont-Ferrand, Grenoble, and Toulouse, in France
