= Phoebe Caldwell =

Autism researcher

Phoebe Caldwell is a retired British practitioner of the social communication approach called Intensive Interaction, working mainly with children and adults on the autistic spectrum. She worked for over 30 years as a practitioner with people whose severe learning disabilities are linked with behavioural distress.

In 2009, Caldwell was awarded with the Times Sternberg Prize for her major contributions beyond the age of 70.

== Career ==
Caldwell began her career as an untrained occupational therapy assistant. She worked primarily with autistic men who were in long term institutions in the Bristol area. She began to undertake unconventional ways of working with and assisting those in the institution. She decided that painting and creating murals would help liven up the dull corridor in which they were confined to during her time as an assistant. After being terminated from her first position, she continued her work in the surrounding areas of Bristol. After recognition spread about Caldwell's work, Bristol University sponsored the creation of a training video, featuring Caldwell.

She was a Rowntree Research Fellow for four years, and trained professionals, therapists, managers, practitioners, parents and carers in the approach known as Intensive interaction. She was employed by the NHS, Social Services, Community Services and Education Services to work with difficult-to-provide-for individuals.

She is the author of eight books, including Finding You Finding Me, From Isolation to Intimacy, and Using Intensive Interaction and Sensory Integration (the latter two with Jane Horwood, Paediatric Occupational Therapist) published by Jessica Kingsley Publishers. She also features in four training films.

Caldwell has been recognised by BBC news.

=== Intensive Interaction ===
Caldwell's system, based on Intensive interaction, primarily using imitation of body language to communicate with autistic people. It is known that autistic people tend to protect themselves from sensory overload by stimming. Caldwell studied this and instead of attempting to intervene, she used it to gain their attention. "Contrary to what is normally understood, children on the autistic spectrum do recognise when we use their own body language to communicate, provided we respond using the repertoire of their personal behaviours. We are shifting their attention from solitary self-stimulation to shared activity" It is important to pay attention to how they do this and the feelings behind it, just mimicking tends to only catch their attention for a short period of time; we need to answer. By echoing them, this will interact with their brain in a positive way and reducing stress, "Aloneness becomes a shared interest."

== Personal life ==
Caldwell is in her early 90's and has five children and nine grandchildren.

== Awards ==
Caldwell was awarded the Times/Sternberg Active Life Award in 2009 at age 76, after over 35 years of work, pioneering autism support. She has created a system that encourages parents and caretakers of autistic people to study their body language and echo them. She taught this system to parents for free. This award celebrates the achievements of those over the age of seventy.

Caldwell received an honorary doctorate of science from the University of Bristol in 2011.
