= HMS Cambridge (1815) =

Ship of the line of the Royal Navy

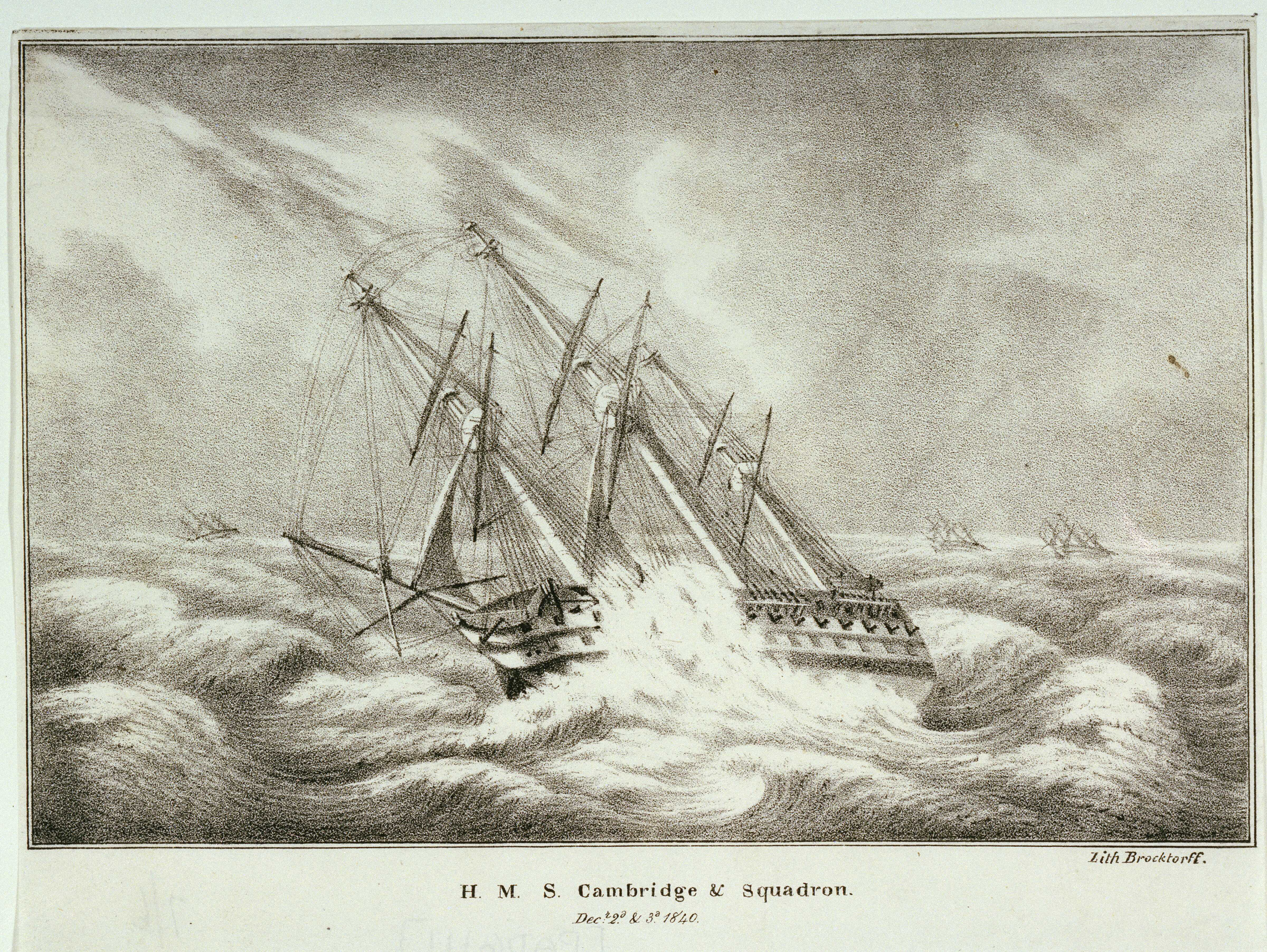
- HMS Cambridge is shown after taking part in the Syrian operations of 1840 against Mehmet Ali, battered by the severe storm that raged in this area.

History

United Kingdom
- Name: HMS Cambridge
- Ordered: 16 July 1810
- Builder: Deptford Dockyard
- Laid down: December 1811
- Launched: 23 June 1815
- Fate: Broken up, 1869

General characteristics
- Type: 80-gun third-rate ship of the line
- Tons burthen: 2,139 bm
- Length: 187 ft 2.25 in (57.1 m) (gundeck)
- Beam: 50 ft 11.5 in (15.5 m)
- Depth of hold: 21 ft 7 in (6.6 m)
- Sail plan: Full-rigged ship
- Armament: 80 guns: Gundeck: 30 × 32 pdrs; Upper gundeck: 32 × 18 pdrs; Quarterdeck: 4 × 12 pdrs, 10 × 32 pdr carronades; Forecastle: 2 × 12 pdrs, 2 × 32 pdr carronades; Poop deck: 6 × 18 pdr carronades

HMS Cambridge was an 80-gun third-rate ship of the line of the Royal Navy, launched on 23 June 1815 at Deptford Dockyard. She was built to the lines of the Danish ship Christian VII which had been captured in 1807 at the Second Battle of Copenhagen.

== Service ==
Cambridge saw little action early in her life, due to the end of the Napoleonic Wars. However, in the journal of Thomas Reed Stavers, she is recorded as being at Callao Roads, under Captain Thomas Maling, on 3 July and on 4/5 September 1824, on the latter occasion sailing from Callao to 'the Island of Lorenzo' to avoid attacks by a Spanish gunboat. Letters in the Foreign Office (FO 16/1) and a detailed record in the Reverend Slavin diary written while he was on board, show that Cambridge sailed to the Americas under Captain Thomas Maling. She left Portsmouth on 5 January 1824 with 72 passengers including the new British consuls to Peru – Thomas Rowcroft, Chile – Christopher Nugent, Argentina – Woodbine Parish and Uruguay – Thomas Samuel Hood. Vice consuls included Udney Passmore, John White, Henry William Rouse, Matthew Carter, Charles Griffiths and Richard Franklin Pousett.

The ship sailed to skirt just west of Portuguese Madeira and anchored at Santa Cruz in Tenerife. She then sailed past Cape Verde and sighted the South American continent near Cape Frio on 21 February 1824. She then sailed into Rio de Janeiro where a refit took place. The ship left on 12 March for Monte Video, where Consul Hood and his party disembarked. Rowcroft and parish with their parties took the English Packet up to Buenos Ayres where Woodbine was to be stationed.

Thomas Rowcroft rode his horse right across the continent and over the Andes mountains to Valparaiso. Meanwhile, the Cambridge sailed from Monte Video around Cape Horn and up the western coast of South America to drop Consul Hood and family at Valparaiso on 26 March 1824 and pick up Rowcroft. The ship then sailed on 27 May further north to Callao Harbour (Peru) and Rowcroft and his daughter, Leonora Maria, disembarked there for his post at Lima. Rowcroft was accidentally shot by Simon Bolivar's men on the evening of 6 December 1824 and died the next day. Captain Maling buried him on San Lorenzo Island.

By January 1830 she was out of commission at Sheerness, but on 31 January that year she was commissioned there under Captain Edward Barnard and from then until 26 January 1843 served as the head of a naval squadron in the Mediterranean Sea. This squadron's actions included operations in the eastern Mediterranean on the coast of Syria, a bombardment of Beirut on 10 September, and blockading Alexandria, all as part of the 1840 combined Ottoman-British campaign against Mehmet Ali.

== Fate ==
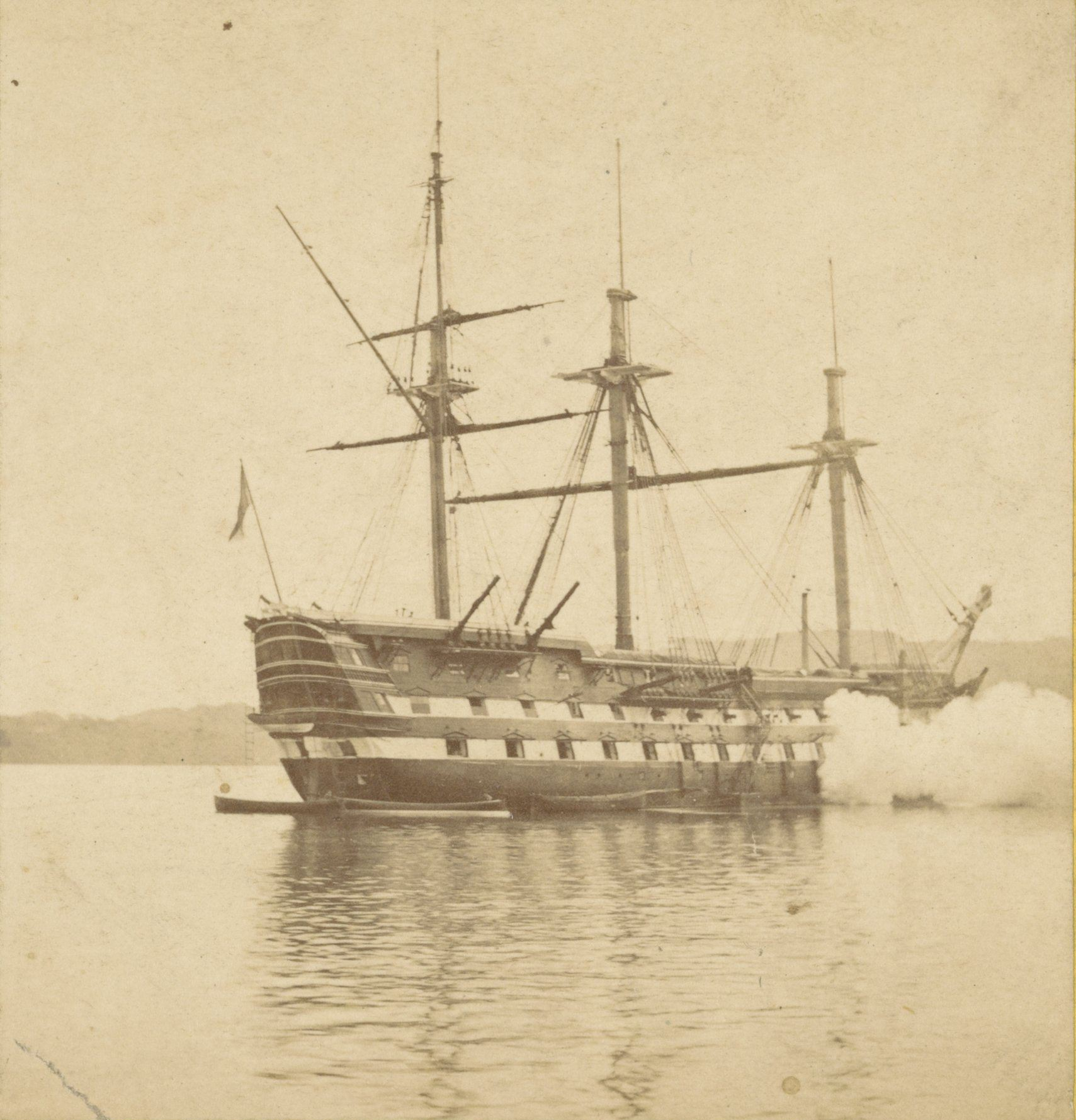
Cambridge during the Great-Gun Practice of 1861 on the Hamoaze, photographed by George Washington Wilson

On her return, she was again decommissioned and in ordinary at Devonport, until on 9 August 1856 when she was recommissioned as 'the gunnery ship at Plymouth', under Captain Richard Strode Hewlett. In this role she saw four more captains (3 January 1857 – 1 April 1862 Arthur William Jerningham; 1 April 1862 – 20 April 1863 Captain Leopold George Heath; 20 April 1863 – May 1867 Charles Joseph Frederick Ewart; May 1867 – January 1869 Fitzgerald Algernon Charles Foley) before being scrapped in 1869. HMS Windsor Castle was renamed HMS Cambridge and replaced her as the gunnery ship.
