= HMS Dauntless (1847) =

Sloop of the Royal Navy

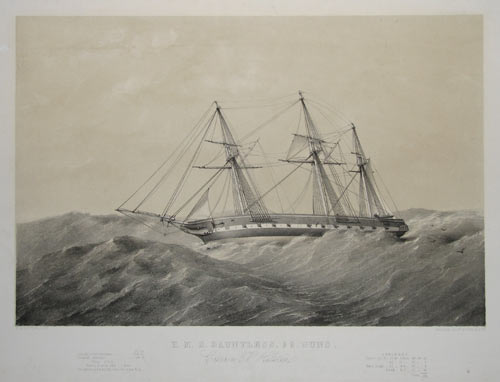
- HMS Dauntless, 33 Guns, lithograph, c. 1855

History

United Kingdom
- Name: HMS Dauntless
- Ordered: 19 February 1844 as a paddle vessel; re-ordered 12 February 1845 as a screw vessel
- Builder: Portsmouth Dockyard
- Laid down: September 1845
- Launched: 5 January 1847
- Commissioned: August 1850 after fitting engines at Glasgow
- Decommissioned: 1878
- Fate: Sold for breaking 1 May 1885

General characteristics
- Type: Steam Screw Frigate
- Tons burthen: 1,497 bm (as completed); 1,575 bm (as lengthened 1850)
- Length: 210 ft 0 in (64.01 m) (as completed); 219 ft 6 in (66.90 m) (as lengthened 1850)
- Beam: 39 ft 3 in (11.96 m)
- Draught: 10 ft 3 in (3.12 m)
- Depth of hold: 26 ft (7.9 m)
- Propulsion: Sails and Steam; 2-cylinder 580 horsepower steam engine; Single (hoisting) Screw
- Sail plan: Ship Rigged
- Armament: Guns: 2 × 68 lb carronades; 4 × 10-inch shell guns; 18 × 32 lb guns; re-armed 1854 with 33 guns

The third HMS Dauntless was a wooden-hulled steam screw frigate, launched at Portsmouth in 1847.

== History ==
First intended as a paddle vessel, she was designed by John Fincham, and partially redesigned to take screw propulsion; in an effort to improve her initially disappointing performance she was lengthened in 1850 at Portsmouth, but her 'paddler' lines did not entirely suit her for propeller drive and she never got the best out of her engines. She achieved a best speed under steam of 10.3 knots (19.1 km/h). Her armament consisted of eighteen 32-pounder guns on her main deck, four 10-inch (250 mm) shell guns and two 68-pounder carronades on her upper deck.

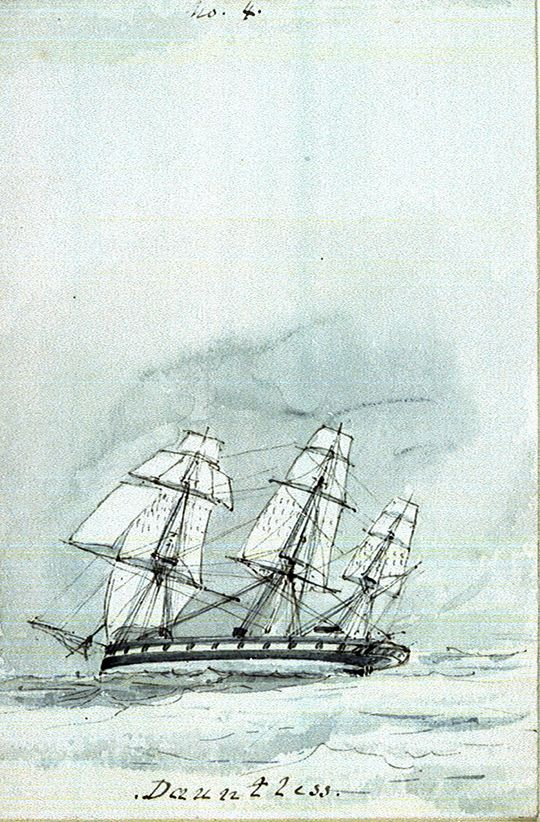
HMS Dauntless in a following wind, 17 November 1850, by Captain Cowper Phipps Coles RN

She was first commissioned in August 1850 for service with the Experimental Squadron to trial in company with other ships of novel design or technology, then in the summer of 1852, Dauntless was assigned to the North America and West Indies Station. In November that year, while on passage from the Virgin Islands to Barbados, an outbreak of yellow fever killed ten of her crew, while a further 73 died of the disease in hospital in Barbados. There is a monument dedicated to these officers and men in the St. Matthias Anglican Church in Hastings, Barbados.

In 1854, with the start of the Crimean War Dauntless sailed with the Fleet to the Baltic, then in December transferred to the Black Sea taking with her artillery details and stores. In February 1855 her gunfire helped to beat back a Russian attack on Turkish army positions at Eupatoria and in April she was at the bombardment of Sevastopol, when one of her 68 pdr. guns burst, causing considerable damage to the ship, but somehow no casualties. Throughout the 1855 campaign on shore, the Dauntless provided officers and men for the Naval Brigade manning the batteries facing the landward defences of Sebastopol, and in October 1855 she made her final contribution to the naval campaign when she took part in the bombardment of Kinburn.

She remained with the Mediterranean Fleet until she returned home to pay off in 1857. She recommissioned in 1859 to become the Coastguard base ship at Southampton, then from 1864 transferred to the Humber on the same service. From 1870 she was reduced to the status of a tender to the Humber Coastguard ship HMS Wyvern until she was finally laid up at Devonport in 1878. She was sold for breaking on 1 May 1885.

== Commanding officers ==
From	To	Captain
7 August 1850	19 May 1853	Captain Edward Pellew Halstead RN
28 December 1853	13 March 1857	Captain Alfred Phillips Ryder RN
10 June 1859	12 August 1859	Captain William Edmonstone RN
12 August 1859	23 August 1859	Captain John Borlase RN
23 August 1859	January 1861	Captain Leopold George Heath RN
January 1861	13 June 1862	Captain James Willcox RN
13 June 1862	13 July 1862	Captain Sherard Osborn RN
14 July 1862	1 April 1864	Captain John Bourmaster Dickson RN
June 1864	30 September 1865	Captain James Newburgh Strange RN
30 September 1865	19 November 1868	Captain Edward Pelham Brenton Von Donop RN
19 November 1868	31 December 1869	Captain Charles Codrington Forsyth RN
