= Herbert Heath =

Royal Navy Admiral (1861–1954)

Admiral Sir Herbert Heath KCB MVO
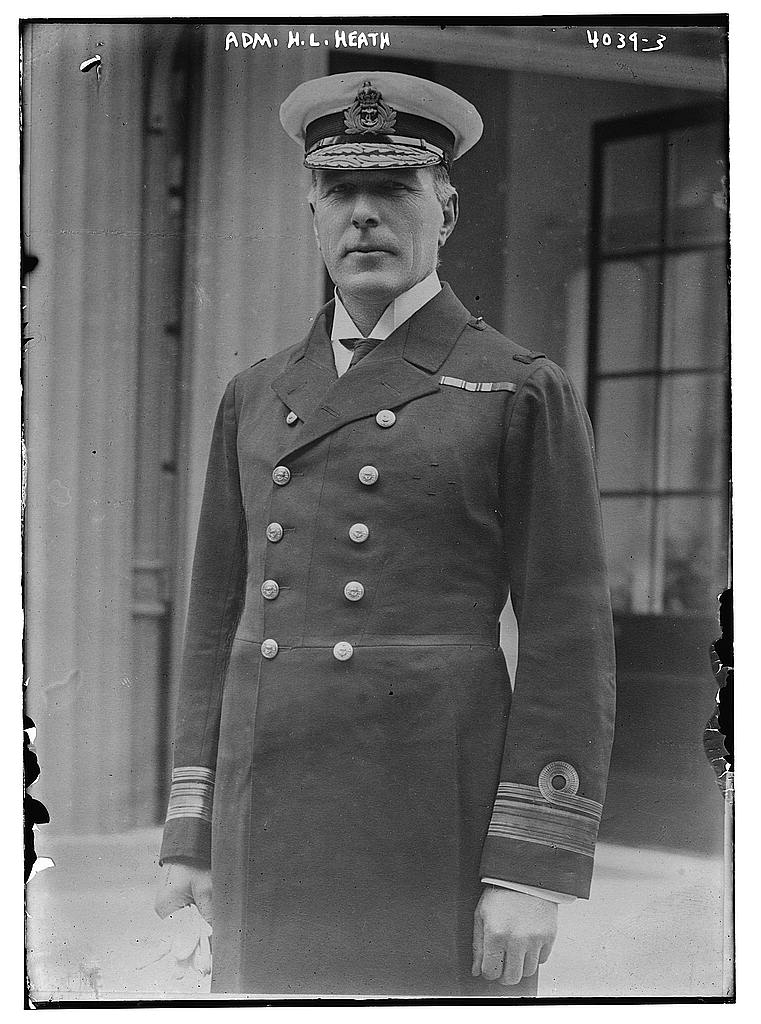
- Heath in 1916
- Born: 27 December 1861
- Died: 22 October 1954 (aged 92)
- Relatives: Vice Admiral Sir Leopold Heath (father)
- Military career
- Allegiance: United Kingdom
- Branch: Royal Navy
- Service years: 1874–1922
- Rank: Admiral
- Commands: Coast of Scotland (1919–22); 3rd Battle Squadron (1916–17); 2nd Cruiser Squadron (1916); 7th Cruiser Squadron (1915–16); Portsmouth Dockyard (1912–15); HMS Superb (1910–11); HMS Lancaster (1906–08); HMS Repulse (1905–06); HMS Vulcan (1903–04)
- Conflicts: First World War
- Awards: Knight Commander of the Order of the Bath; Member of the Royal Victorian Order; Commander of the Legion of Honour (France); Grand Cordon of the Order of the Rising Sun (Japan); Navy Distinguished Service Medal (United States)

Admiral Sir Herbert Leopold Heath, KCB, MVO (27 December 1861 – 22 October 1954) was a senior officer in the Royal Navy who served as Second Sea Lord and Chief of Naval Personnel from 1917 to 1919.

== Military career ==
Born the son of Vice Admiral Sir Leopold Heath and educated at Brighton College, Heath was commissioned into the Royal Navy in 1874. In 1877 he took part in an engagement with the Peruvian rebel ship Huáscar. He was on board the battleship, HMS Victoria, when it was involved in a collision with the battleship, HMS Camperdown, and sank in 1893 with the loss of 372 lives. He led a party that tried to patch the hole in Victoria, but the ship was sinking too quickly for repairs. He served on board the protected cruiser HMS Powerful on the China station and as she went to South Africa from 1899 to 1900, during the early part of the Second Boer War.

Heath was promoted captain on 1 January 1902, and later that year was appointed Assistant-Director of Naval Intelligence at the Admiralty. In 1904 he was made commanding officer of the torpedo boat depot ship, HMS Vulcan, in the Mediterranean. Later he commanded the battleship, HMS Repulse, and the cruiser, HMS Lancaster. In 1908 he became naval attaché in Berlin. In 1910 he took command of the battleship, HMS Superb and around this time he was appointed the Naval Aide-de-Camp to the King. In 1912 he was appointed Admiral-Superintendent of Portsmouth Dockyard remaining in that post until 1914.

Heath served in the First World War and in 1916 took command of the 2nd Cruiser Squadron of the Grand Fleet and as such he was the senior admiral of the cruiser line at the Battle of Jutland in May 1916. In November 1916 he was appointed to the command of the 3rd Battle Squadron. In 1917 he became Second Sea Lord and Chief of Naval Personnel. After the war he was made Commander-in-Chief, Coast of Scotland. He retired in 1922.

== Family ==
In 1891 Heath married Elizabeth Catherine Simson and they went on to have two daughters.

Honorary titles
Unknown	Naval Aide-de-Camp to the King ? to 1911	Succeeded by John de Mestre Hutchison
Military offices
Preceded by Sir Rosslyn Wemyss	Second Sea Lord; 1917–1919	Succeeded by Sir Montague Browning
Preceded by Sir Cecil Burney	Commander-in-Chief, Coast of Scotland; 1919–1922	Succeeded by Sir John Green
Heraldic offices
Preceded by Sir Arthur Paget	King of Arms of the Order of the British Empire; 1929–1947	Succeeded by Sir Roderick Carr
