= John E. Caldwell =

Canadian businessman

John Edward Caldwell (born c. 1950) is a Canadian business executive who is chair of Advanced Micro Devices and a director of Faro Technologies, Iamgold, and Samuel, Son & Co. Caldwell earned a bachelor of commerce degree from Carleton University in Ontario, Canada, and is a member of the Charted Professional Accountants of Ontario. He has been on the audit committees of ten public companies. Caldwell has also been a lecturer on board oversight responsibility for enterprise risk through McMaster University in Canada as part of an accredited board of director education program for several years.

== Affiliations ==
Caldwell has been associated with a number of institutions, notably including:

- SMTC Corporation (President and CEO, 2003–2011)
- Mosaic Group Inc. (2002-03)
- Geac Computer Corporation (Limited Consultant, 2001-02)
- Geac Computer Corporation (Limited President and CEO, 2000-01)
- CAE (President and CEO, 1993-99)
- CAE (CFO, 1988-92)
- Advanced Micro Devices (Member of board, 2006-)
- ATI Technologies, Inc. (Member of board, 2003-06, to AMD)
- Cognos, Inc. (Member of board, 2000-)
- Faro Technologies (Member of board, 2002-)
- IAMGOLD Corporation (Member of board, 2006-)
- Rothmans Inc. (Member of board, 2004-)
- Sleeman Breweries, Ltd. (Member of board, 2004-)
- SMTC Corporation (Member of board, 2003-, as Chairman, 2004-05, continuing)
- Stelco Inc. (Member of board)
