= Bruce Caldwell =

Bruce Caldwell may refer to:

- Bruce Caldwell (American sportsman) (1906–1959), American baseball player and American football running back
- Bruce Caldwell (rugby union) (1908–1975), rugby union player who represented Australia
- Bruce Caldwell (bishop) (1947–2025), American Episcopal bishop
- Bruce Caldwell (economist) (born 1952), American historian of economics
