= James Denison =

American judge (1812–1873)

James H. Denison (March 3, 1812 – February 6, 1873) was a justice of the Supreme Court of Texas from January 1870 to July 1870.

Little is known of Denison, who was "appointed an associate justice of the Texas Supreme Court by military authority during the turbulent Reconstruction era. Denison served on the court for several months from January 22, 1870 until July 5, 1870".

Political offices
Preceded by Albert H. Latimer	Justice of the Texas Supreme Court; 1870–1870	Succeeded by Colbert Caldwell
