= Alfred Ryder (Royal Navy officer) =

Royal Navy Admiral of the Fleet (1820–1888)

Admiral of the Fleet Sir Alfred Ryder KCB
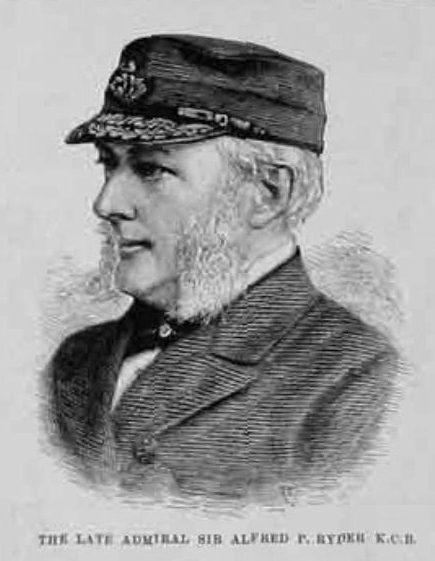
- Sir Alfred Ryder
- Born: 27 June 1820
- Died: 30 April 1888 (aged 67); Vauxhall steamboat pier, London
- Military career
- Allegiance: United Kingdom
- Branch: Royal Navy
- Service years: 1833–1882
- Rank: Admiral of the Fleet
- Commands: HMS Vixen; HMS Dauntless; HMS Hero; Coastguard; China Station; Portsmouth Command
- Conflicts: Crimean War
- Awards: Knight Commander of the Order of the Bath

Admiral of the Fleet Sir Alfred Phillipps Ryder KCB (27 June 1820 – 30 April 1888) was a Royal Navy officer. As a junior officer he undertook the role of transporting Pedro de Sousa Holstein, 1st Duke of Palmela, the Portuguese ambassador, back home to Lisbon and then delivering the Percy Doyle, the British ambassador to the Republic of Mexico, to Mexico City. He then led a naval brigade dispatched to Nicaragua to deal with the unlawful detention of two British subjects. He pursued the Nicaraguan commander, a Colonel Salas, for 30 miles up the San Juan River and captured the fort at Serapique.

Ryder became commanding officer of the frigate HMS Dauntless in which he saw action in the Black Sea and then took part in the Battle of Kinburn during the Crimean War. He went on to be Controller of the Coastguard, Commander-in-Chief, China Station and then Commander-in-Chief, Portsmouth. In retirement he was an active member of the Church of England Purity Society. He suffered from depression and died after falling into the River Thames at the Vauxhall steamboat pier.

== Early career ==
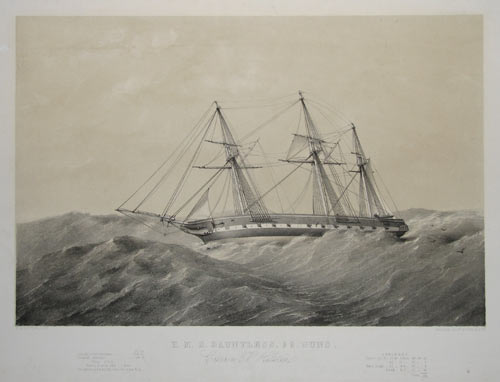
The frigate HMS Dauntless which Ryder commanded during the Crimean War

Born the son of the Rt Rev Henry Ryder, Bishop of Lichfield and Sophia Ryder (née Phillipps), Ryder joined the Royal Navy in May 1833. After passing his exams at the Royal Naval College, Portsmouth in July 1839, he was promoted to lieutenant on 2 July 1841 and was appointed to the fifth-rate HMS Belvidera in the Mediterranean Fleet. Promoted to commander on 26 May 1847, he became commanding officer of the steam sloop HMS Vixen on the North America and West Indies Station. In that capacity, he first undertook the role of transporting Pedro de Sousa Holstein, 1st Duke of Palmela, the Portuguese ambassador, back home to Lisbon and then delivering the Percy Doyle, the British ambassador to the Republic of Mexico, to Mexico City. In 1848 he led a naval brigade dispatched to Nicaragua to deal with the unlawful detention of two British subjects. He pursued the Nicaraguan commander, a Colonel Salas, for 30 miles up the San Juan River and captured the fort at Serapique.

Promoted to captain on 2 May 1848, Ryder became commanding officer of the frigate HMS Dauntless in the Channel Squadron, in December 1853. In HMS Dauntless he saw action in the Black Sea and then took part in the Battle of Kinburn in October 1855 during the Crimean War. During the War Admiral Sir Charles Napier threatened to court-martial him for letting an enemy ship escape but the Admiralty refused to support this course of action. After the war Ryder sought leave and travelled to Malta to meet his wife, who was dying of tuberculosis only to find that she had died before his arrival, leaving a two-year-old child. He was awarded the Turkish Order of the Medjidie, fourth class on 3 April 1858. At this time he also wrote a paper on methods of ascertaining the distance between ships at sea.

Ryder went on to be commanding officer of the second-rate HMS Hero in the Channel Squadron in January 1861 and then became Private secretary to Edward Seymour, 12th Duke of Somerset, First Lord of the Admiralty in November 1862 before becoming Controller of the Coastguard in 1863.

== Senior command ==
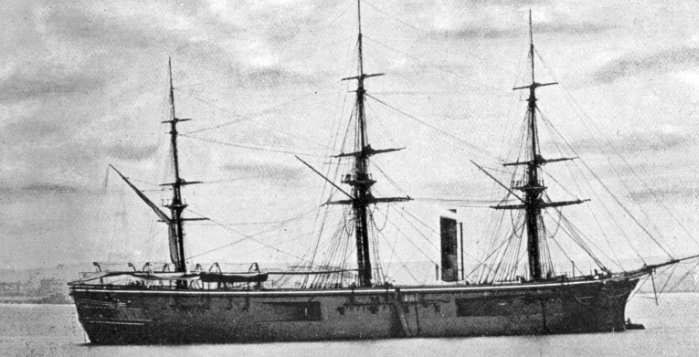
The ironclad warship HMS Penelope, Ryder's flagship as Commander-in-Chief, China Station

Promoted to rear admiral on 2 April 1866, Ryder became Second-in-Command of the Channel Squadron in 1868 and naval attaché in Paris in 1869. This was a particularly difficult time in Paris with the French parliament voting to declare war on the Kingdom of Prussia in July 1870, the rapid mobilisation of the German coalition and then the French army being decisively defeated at the Battle of Sedan in September 1870 and at the Siege of Metz in October 1870 during the Franco-Prussian War.

Promoted to vice admiral on 7 May 1872, Ryder became naval attaché to the Maritime Courts of Europe in February 1873. At this time he founded the Naval Church Society which lobbied for the appointment of chaplains to some of the larger ships. He went on to be Commander-in-Chief, China Station, with his flag in the ironclad warship HMS Penelope, in August 1874 and, having been promoted to full admiral on 5 August 1877, he became Commander-in-Chief, Portsmouth in November 1879. He inherited Wellswood House at Torquay from his uncle at this time and made it his home. In October 1881 he was appointed a commissioner for the Patriotic Fund.

Ryder retired in 1882 and became a trustee of the Church of England Purity Society, an organisation founded by Edward Benson, a former Archbishop of Canterbury. Ryder wrote letters under the pen name of XYZ drawing attention to the plight of young female models and the practice of men and women studying them together.

Ryder was appointed a Knight Commander of the Order of the Bath on 24 May 1884 and was promoted to Admiral of the Fleet on 29 April 1885. He suffered from depression and died on 30 April 1888 at age 67 after falling into the River Thames at the Vauxhall steamboat pier. The coroner recorded an accidental death although his medical history suggests it may have been suicide. He was buried at St Mary the Virgin Church at Hambleden in Buckinghamshire: there is a stained glass window to his memory in St Ann's Church in Portsmouth.

== Family ==
In June 1852 Ryder married Louisa Dawson; they had one son.

== See also ==
- O'Byrne, William Richard (1849). "Ryder, Alfred Phillipps" . A Naval Biographical Dictionary . John Murray – via Wikisource.

== Sources ==
- Heathcote, Tony (2002). The British Admirals of the Fleet 1734 – 1995. Pen & Sword Ltd. ISBN 0-85052-835-6.
- Prettejohn, Elizabeth (1999). After the Pre-Raphaelites. Manchester University Press. ISBN 0-7190-5406-0.

Military offices
| Preceded by Sir Charles Shadwell | Commander-in-Chief, China Station; 1874–1877 | Succeeded by Sir Charles Hillyar |
| Preceded by Sir Edward Fanshawe | Commander-in-Chief, Portsmouth; 1879–1882 | Succeeded by Sir Geoffrey Hornby |
