= Jimmy Caldwell (footballer) =

Scottish footballer

Personal information
- Full name: James Henry Caldwell
- Date of birth: 9 January 1884
- Place of birth: Carronshore, Scotland
- Height: 5 ft 10 1/2 in (1.79 m)
- Position: Goalkeeper

Senior career*
Years	Team	Apps	(Gls)
- Carron Athletic
- Gairdoch Juniors
1905–1906	Dunipace Juniors		
1906–1908	East Stirlingshire	38	(0)
1908	Tottenham Hotspur	0	(0)
- Reading
1912–1913	Everton	31	(0)
1913–1914	Woolwich Arsenal	3	(0)
1914–1915	Reading		
1920–1922	Alloa Athletic	36	(0)
1922–1923	East Stirlingshire	18	(0)
- * Club domestic league appearances and goals

James Henry Caldwell was a Scottish professional footballer who played as a goalkeeper in the Scottish League for East Stirlingshire and Alloa Athletic. He also played Football League for Everton and Woolwich Arsenal.

== Personal life ==
Caldwell served as a private in the Black Watch during the First World War.

== Career statistics ==
Appearances and goals by club, season and competition
Club	Season	League			National Cup		Other		Total	
Club	Season	Division	Apps	Goals	Apps	Goals	Apps	Goals	Apps	Goals
East Stirlingshire	1906–07	Scottish Second Division	16	0	1	0	―		17	0
East Stirlingshire	1907–08	Scottish Second Division	22	0	0	0	9 (Note: Appearances in Scottish Qualifying Cup)	0	31	0
East Stirlingshire	Total		38	0	1	0	9	0	48	0
Everton	1912–13	First Division	31	0	5	0	―		36	0
Woolwich Arsenal	1913–14	Second Division	3	0	0	0	―		3	0
Alloa Athletic	1921–22	Scottish Second Division	36	0	3	0	―		39	0
East Stirlingshire	1922–23	Scottish Second Division	18	0	0	0	―		18	0
East Stirlingshire	Total		56	0	1	0	9	0	66	0
Career total			126	0	9	0	9	0	144	0

== Honours ==
Dunipace

- Scottish Junior Cup: 1905–06

Alloa Athletic

- Scottish Second Division: 1921–22
