= Justice Caldwell =

Justice Caldwell may refer to:

- Colbert Caldwell (1822–1892), associate justice of the Texas Supreme Court
- Millard Caldwell (1897–1984), associate justice of the Florida Supreme Court
- Waller C. Caldwell (1849–1924), associate justice of the Tennessee Supreme Court
- William B. Caldwell (judge) (1808–1876), associate justice of the Ohio Supreme Court

== See also ==
- Judge Caldwell (disambiguation)
