= Judge Caldwell =

Judge Caldwell may refer to:

- Alexander Caldwell (Virginia judge) (1774–1839), judge of the United States District Court for the Western District of Virginia
- Henry Clay Caldwell (1832–1915), judge of the United States Court of Appeals for the Eighth Circuit
- Karen K. Caldwell (born 1956), judge of the United States District Court for the Eastern District of Kentucky
- William W. Caldwell (1925–2019), judge of the United States District Court for the Middle District of Pennsylvania

== See also ==
- Justice Caldwell (disambiguation)
