= Oliver Caldwell (architect) =

British architect

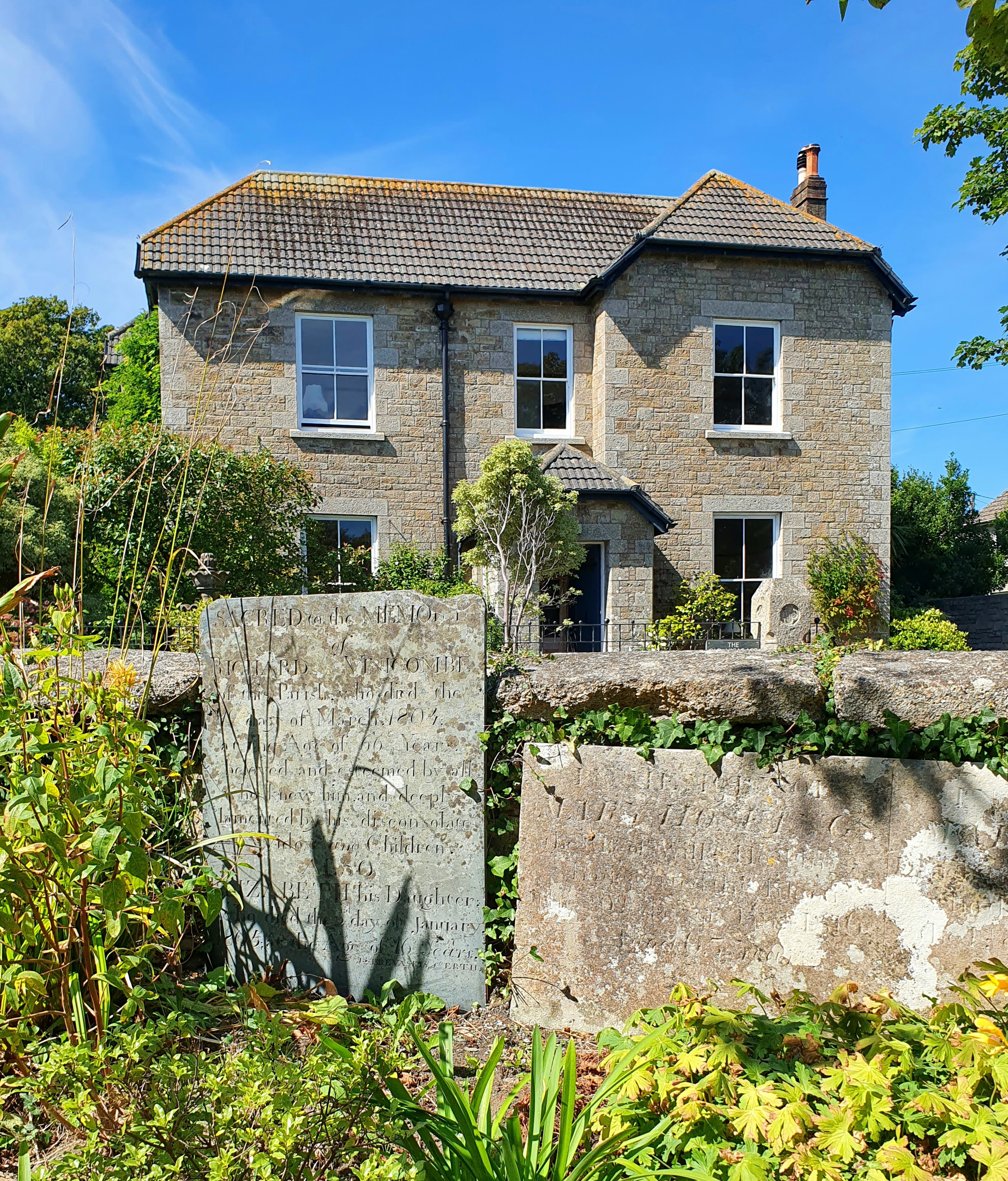
The Vicarage, Madron 1883

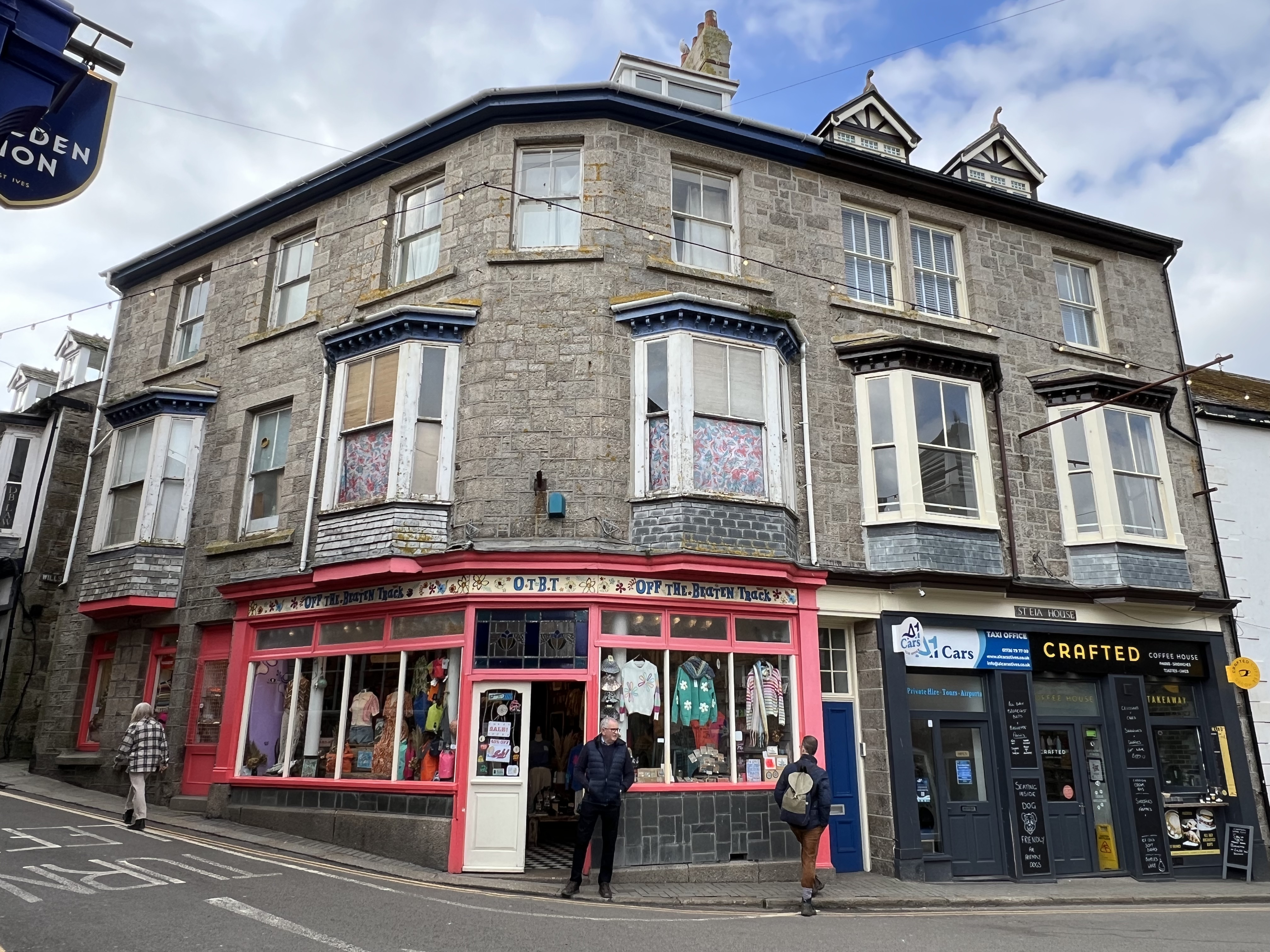
Buildings in St Ives 1887

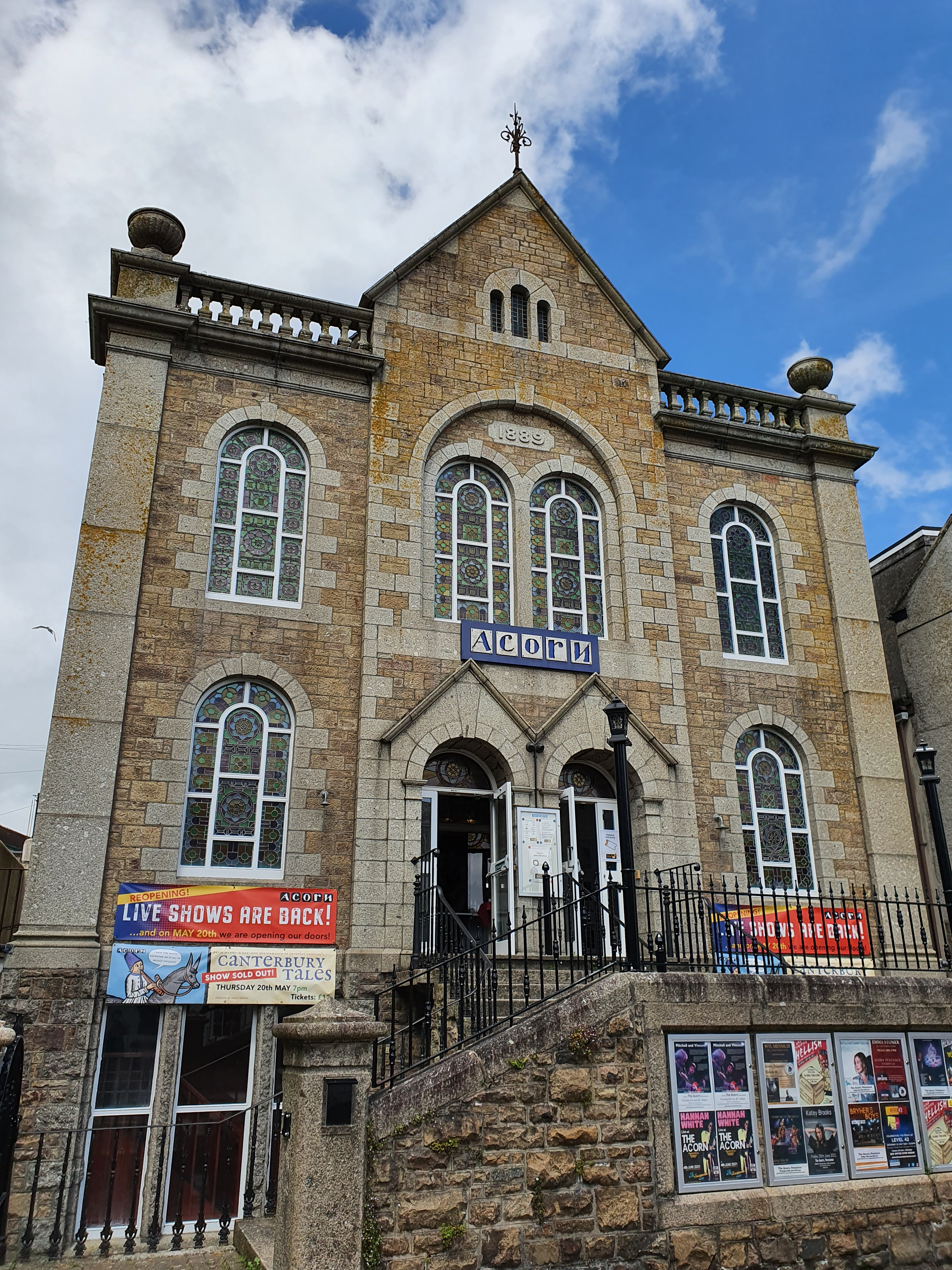
Methodist Church, Parade Street, Penzance 1890

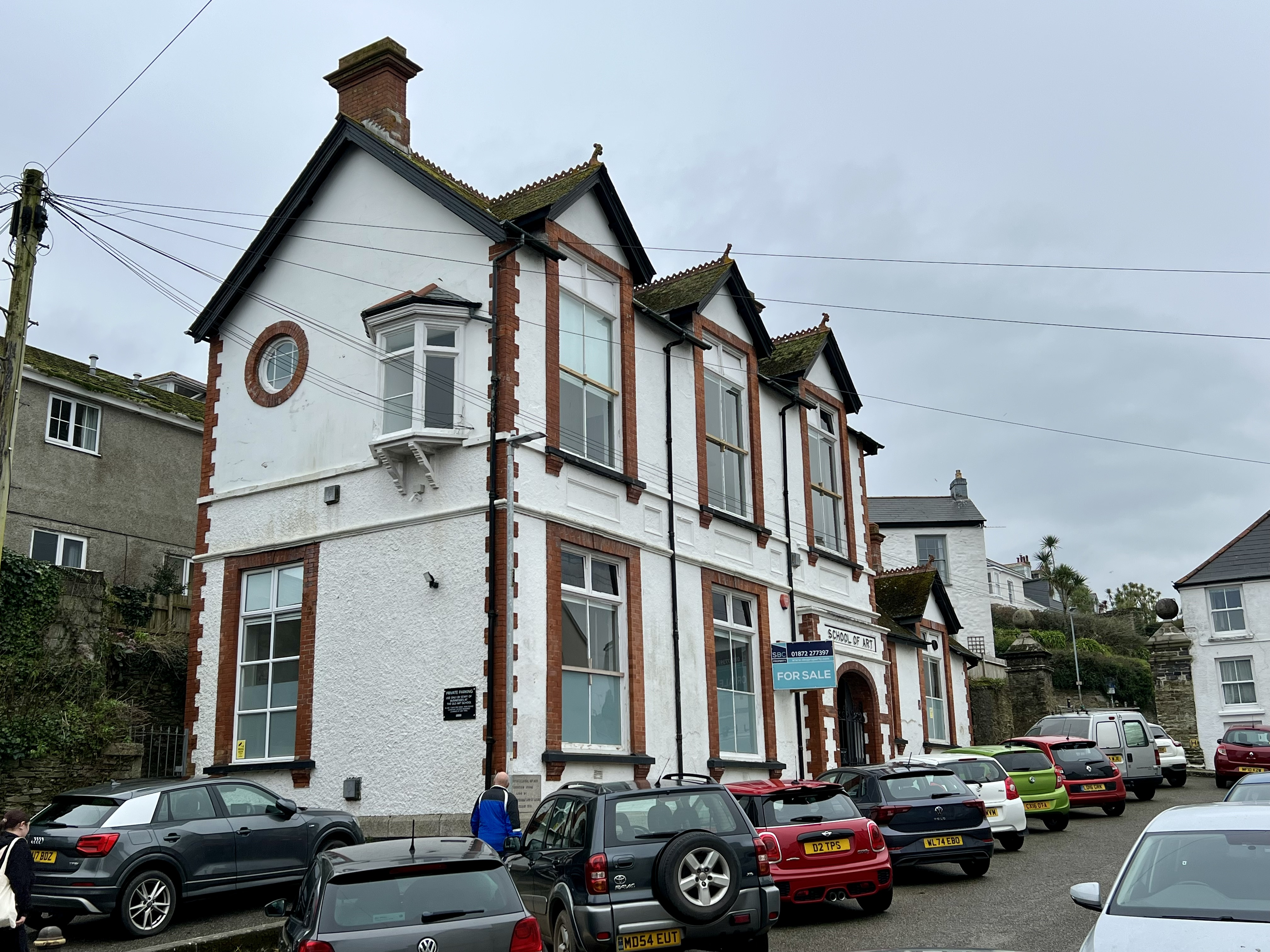
Former Falmouth School of Art 1901

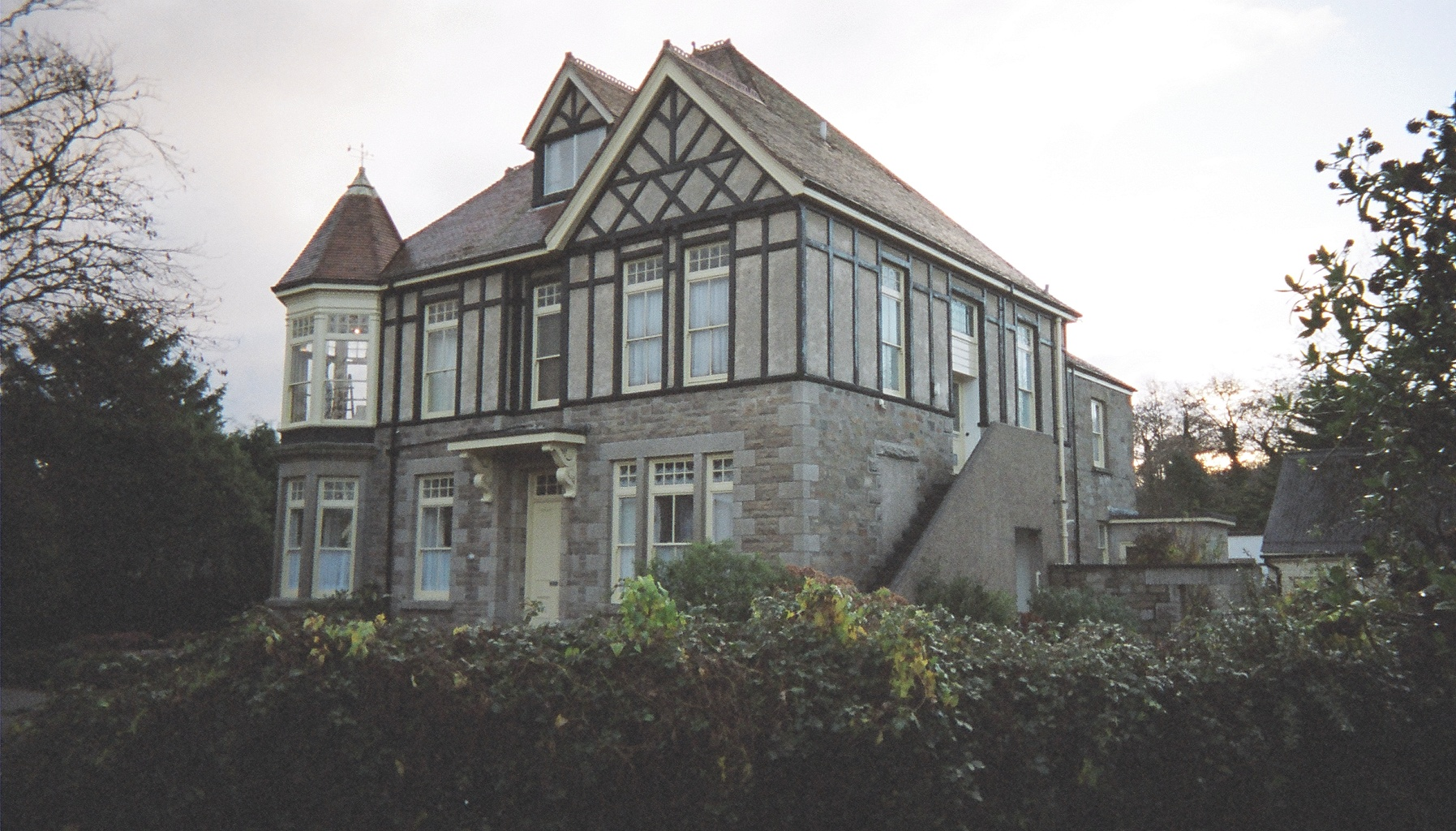
Trehurst, Alexandra Road, Penzance 1902

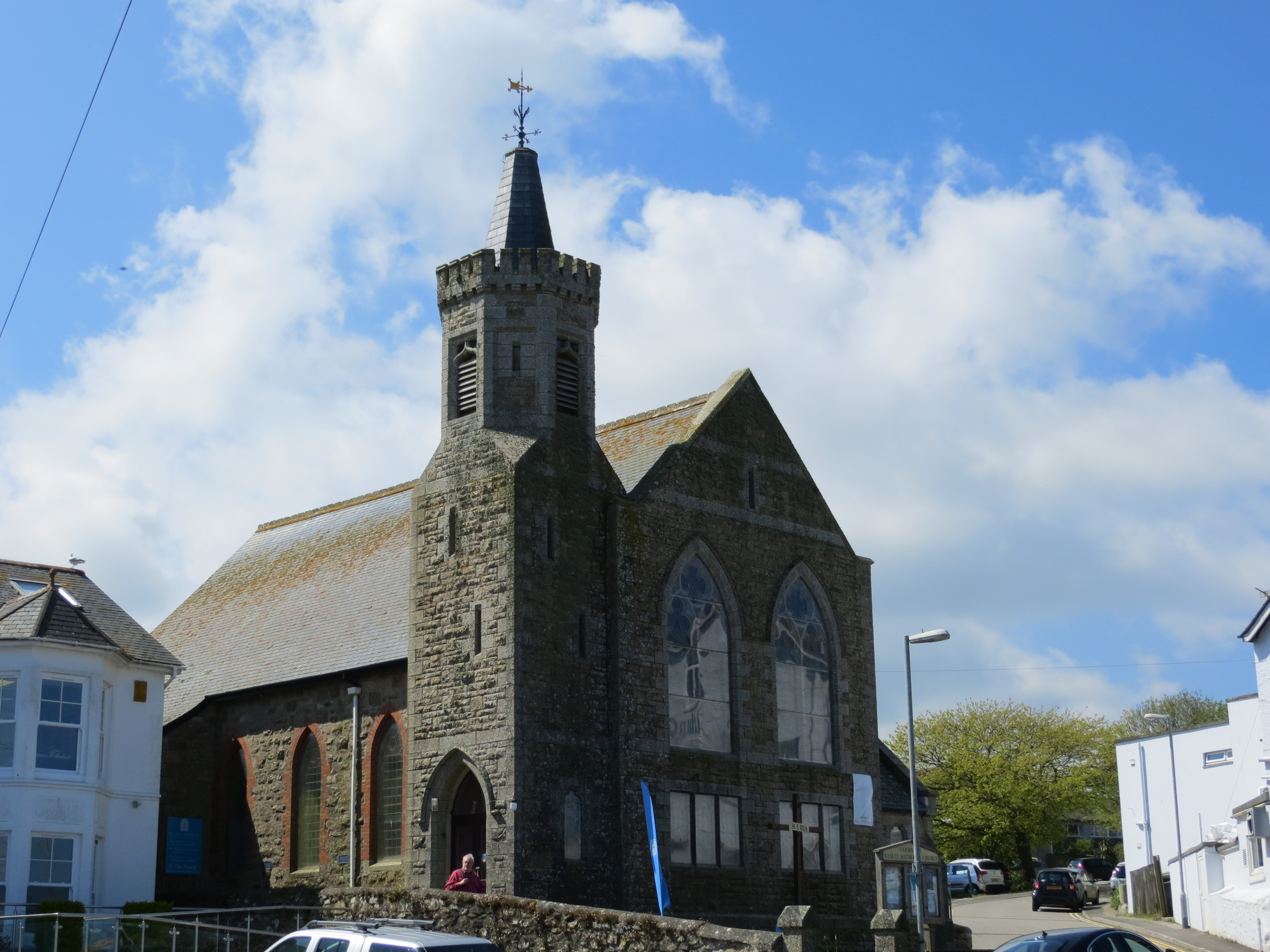
Carbis Bay Wesleyan Methodist Church 1903

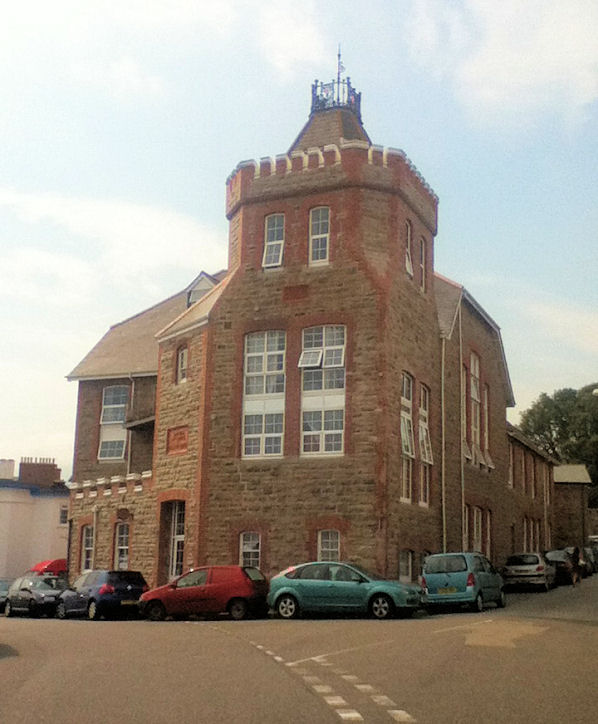
Seamans' Mission, Penzance 1908

Lieut. Col. Oliver Caldwall FRIBA VD (1862–1910) was an architect based in Penzance, Cornwall.

== Life ==
He was born at the end of 1862, the son of Alderman James Caldwell (1830–1923) and Sophie Robinson (1831–1894). He was baptised in the Wesleyan Methodist Church, Penzance on 14 January 1863. He was educated at Penzance Grammar School. He worked with a local builder from 1876 before moving to London where he was articled to William Macie Leir Seaman of Kensington.

He commenced practice in 1883 where he had offices at Victoria Square, Penzance. He was appointed FRIBA in 1892.

He began his military career in the Volunteer forces as a lieutenant in the Marazion Artillery Company progressing to become Lieutenant Colonel. He founded the Cornwall Volunteer Rifle Association.

He married Minna Tyacke (1866–1944) of Camborne on 6 June 1888 in St George's Church, Bloomsbury Way, London. They had two sons and one daughter:

- Oliver Reginald Caldwell (1890–1922)
- Wilfred Caldwell (1894–1935)
- Kathleen Mary Sophia Caldwell (1902–1972)

He died on 18 August 1910 of gastritis and complications at his home, Elmsdale, Alexandra Road, Penzance and left an estate valued at £2,187 3s 5d (equivalent to £282,000 in 2023).

== Works ==
- Vicarage, Madron 1883
- Two dwelling houses and shops for Mrs. Nicholas, North Street, Penzance 1884.
- New shop and premises, 26-27 Market Place, Penzance 1884 (26 demolished in 1932)
- Wesley Rock Chapel, Hea-Moor 1884 (renovations)
- Dwelling house for Capt. W.J. Paynter, Porthminster Hill, St Ives 1884-85
- Sunday School, St John the Baptist's Church, Penzance 1885
- Cattle shed, Lesingey Farm, Madron 1886
- Printing offices for the Cornish Telegraph Company, 16 Chapel Street, Penzance 1885
- Sea Water Public Baths, Penzance 1887-90 (demolished 1935)
- Wesley Chapel, Camborne 1887 (reseating and renovations)
- Shops (now St Eia House), Market Place, St Ives 1887
- Villa for Dr. Staff, Terrace, St Ives 1887
- Mission Room, St Sennen's Church 1888
- Wesleyan Schools, St Just, Penzance 1888
- Larrigan Bolitho Convalescent Home 1889
- United Methodist Free Chapel, Mount Street, Penzance 1889
- Centenary Wesleyan Chapel, Trelowarren Street, Camborne 1890 (renovations)
- Police Station, St Ives 1891
- Bacon Factory, West of England Bacon Curing Company, Redruth 1891
- Convalescent Home, Alexandra Terrace, Penzance 1892
- Roman Catholic School, St Mary's Street, Penzance 1892
- Board School, Carnyorth, St Just-in-Penwith 1892
- Wesleyan School, Lelant 1893–94
- Penzance Club, Alexandra Road, Penzance 1896
- Almshouses, Institute and Inn, Gluval 1896
- Police Station, Newquay 1896
- Y.M.C.A., Penzance 1897
- Vicarage, St John the Baptist's Church, Penzance 1898
- Post Office and Postmaster's residence, Camborne 1899-1900
- Methodist Church (now Acorn Theatre), Parade Street, Penzance 1889-1890
- Tregathen Hotel, St Mary's, Isles of Scilly 1899 (additions).
- Falmouth School of Art 1901
- Police Station, Helston 1902
- Trehurst Villa, Alexandra Road, Penzance 1902
- Penberthy Croft, St Hilary, Penzance 1903
- Truro Rifle Range, Newlyn Downe, Newlyn East 1903
- Wesleyan Chapel, Carbis Bay 1903
- Wesleyan Chapel, Trezelah, Gluval 1904
- West Cornwall Hospital and Dispensary, St Clare Street, Penzance 1904
- Public Benefit Boot Company, Penzance 1905
- Richard Foster Bolitho Almshouses, Tremenheere Road, Penzance 1906-07
- Riviera Palace Hotel, Penzance (additions) 1906
- St Erth Methodist Church, 1906 (alterations)
- The Firs, King's Road, Penzance 1907
- Barclay's Bank, Penryn Street, Redruth 1907–08
- Seaman's Mission / Sailor's Institute, Alexandra Gardens, Penzance 1908
- The Sycamores for Jabez Bunt, Alverton, Penzance 1908
- Pendarves Villa, Tolver Place, Pendarves Road, 1911
- County Girls’ School (now Penwith College), Penzance 1912
- Trenalls House and Old Farmhouse, Prussia Cove (extended)

== Sources ==
- Beacham, Peter; Pevsner, Nikolaus (2014). The Buildings of England. Cornwall. Yale University Press. ISBN 9780300126686.
