= Intensive interaction =

Method of teaching communication to people with severe learning issues

Intensive Interaction is an approach for supporting the social inclusion and social communication skill development of people with learning difficulties and/or autism, and other groups of people who have difficulty with social engagement .

The approach focuses on the active development of the 'fundamentals of communication', these being the foundational communication concepts and abilities that precede speech development.

== History ==
Intensive Interaction was developed by teachers Dave Hewett and Melanie Nind at Harperbury Hospital School in Southern England during the 1980s. The development of the approach came about as a result of practitioners exploring teaching approaches that moved away from the then current dominance of behavioural psychology.

== How to do Intensive Interaction ==
According to Nind (1996), there are 5 central features of Intensive Interaction:

1. The creation of mutual pleasure and interactive games between the practitioner and the recipient person.
2. Practitioner adjustment of their interpersonal behaviours in order to become more engaging and meaningful for the person.
3. Interactions flowing in time: with pauses, repetitions and blended rhythms.
4. The use of intentionality: responding to the person's behaviours as if they had communicative significance.
5. The use of contingent responding: following the person's lead and sharing control of the social interactivity.

Generally, the responsive and learner-led techniques of Intensive Interaction are informed by an understanding of how infants are supported in their learning of the highly complex and interrelated skills of human social communication. In such parent-infant interactions, infants gradually accrue an understanding of the basic principles and practices of human social communication by taking part in many responsive, cumulative interactions with the adults around them. Thus the learning develops through repeated, highly responsive, rather than directive engagements.

== 'The Fundamentals of Communication' ==
The use of Intensive Interaction supports a person with social communication difficulties or differences to develop the understanding and use of "the fundamentals of communication". These "fundamentals of communication" are typically referred to as being attainments such as:

- developing the ability to attend to another person
- learning to do sequences of activity with that person, or taking turns in exchanges of behaviour
- sharing personal space
- using and understanding eye contacts and facial expressions
- using and understanding physical contacts
- using vocalisations with meaning (for some, including speech development)
- enjoying being with another person
