= Frederick Heath-Caldwell =

British Army officer

Major-General Frederick Heath-Caldwell CB JP
- Born: 21 February 1858
- Died: 18 September 1945 (aged 87)
- Relatives: Vice-Admiral Sir Leopold Heath (father)
- Military career
- Allegiance: United Kingdom
- Branch: British Army; Royal Air Force
- Service years: 1877–1919
- Rank: Major-General
- Commands: South-Eastern Area (1918–19); No. 1 Area RAF (1918); Portsmouth Garrison (1916–18)
- Conflicts: Anglo-Egyptian War; Mahdist War; Second Boer War; First World War
- Awards: Companion of the Order of the Bath

Frederick Crofton Heath-Caldwell (born Heath: 21 February 1858 – 18 September 1945) was a senior British Army officer, who also served in the early Royal Air Force.

== Military career ==
Joining the Royal Engineers in 1877, he was promoted to captain on 25 January 1888, and to major the following day. He served during the Anglo-Egyptian War, the Mahdist War, and the Second Boer War, during the last of which he was promoted to lieutenant-colonel on 29 November 1900. After returning from South Africa, he was appointed Commanding Royal Engineer of the Southern sub-district at Gibraltar in early 1903.

After serving as commander of the Scottish Coast Defences, he was promoted to major general in July 1914.

During the First World War, which began just weeks later, he was posted to the War Office as director of military training (DMT) (1914–1916), served as General Officer Commanding (GOC) of Portsmouth (1916–1918), and, in what was to be his final military appointment, served as GOC South-Eastern Area in the newly created Royal Air Force (1918–1919). In retirement, he was a magistrate in Chester.

== Personal and family life ==
Heath-Caldwell was the second son of Vice Admiral Sir Leopold Heath. He took the name Heath-Caldwell after inheriting the Linley Wood estate in Talke, Staffordshire, in 1913 from a great aunt. In 1889, he married Constance Mary Helsham-Jones, daughter of Colonel Henry Helsham-Jones. They had two sons: Cuthbert Helsham Heath-Caldwell (1889–1979), a decorated Royal Navy officer, and Martin Frederick Heath-Caldwell (1893–1915), who was killed in action during the First World War.

A keen sportsman, Heath-Caldwell played in the 1878 FA Cup Final as part of the Royal Engineers A.F.C.
