= Mike Caldwell =

Mike Caldwell may refer to:

- Mike Caldwell (baseball) (born 1949), American baseball pitcher
- Mike Caldwell (linebacker) (born 1971), former American football linebacker
- Mike Caldwell (wide receiver) (born 1971), former American football wide receiver

== See also ==
- Michael Caldwell (born 1989), American politician in Georgia
