= David Caldwell =

David or Dave Caldwell may refer to:

- David Caldwell (American football executive) (born 1974), American football scout and executive
- David Caldwell (runner) (1891–1953), American Olympic runner
- David Caldwell (footballer, born 1932) (1932–2017), Scottish footballer (Aberdeen FC)
- David Caldwell (footballer, born 1960), Scottish footballer (Mansfield Town)
- David Caldwell (North Carolina minister) (1725–1824), minister, statesman and soldier living in Guilford County, North Carolina
- David Caldwell (nose tackle) (born 1965), former American football nose tackle
- David Caldwell (safety) (born 1987), American football safety
- David Caldwell (tennis) (born 1974), American tennis player
- David D. Caldwell (1870–1953), philatelist
- David H. Caldwell (born 1951), Scottish archaeologist
