= Henry Caldwell =

Military officer, businessman, and political leader in Lower Canada

- Born: 1735; Ireland
- Died: May 28, 1810 (aged 74–75); Sainte-Foy, Quebec City, Lower Canada
- Citizenship: British
- Occupation(s): Soldier, politician, landowner
- Known for: Member of the Legislative Council of Lower Canada
- Title: Major in the British Army
- Children: John Caldwell (seigneur)

Henry Caldwell (c. 1735 – 28 May 1810) was a distinguished military officer, successful businessman, and influential member of the Legislative Council of Lower Canada. Known for his leadership during critical battles such as the Siege of Quebec, he also became a prominent landowner and key figure in the economic and political development of the colony in the late 18th and early 19th centuries.

== Early life ==
The youngest son of Sir John Caldwell (d. 1744) 3rd Bt., of Castle Caldwell & Wellsborough, High Sheriff of Fermanagh; by his wife Anne (d. 1769), daughter of the Very Rev. John Trench (d. 1725) of Moate, County Galway; Dean of Raphoe.

== Capture of Louisbourg ==
Henry Caldwell fought with distinction at the capture of Louisbourg, Cape Breton, afterward promoted to captain by James Wolfe (who included him in his will) and assistant quartermaster to General Guy Carleton, 1st Baron Dorchester during the Siege of Quebec.

== Post-military career ==
Caldwell retired from the British army with the rank of major in 1774, remaining in Quebec. He leased land that had belonged to Governor George Murray (British Army officer) and built Caldwell Manor. The following year he served as a Lieutenant-Colonel with the militia during the defence of Sainte-Foy and was chosen to carry the dispatches reporting the victory to London.

In a June 15, 1776, letter written aboard HMS Hunter, Caldwell gives a vivid first-hand account of his leadership during the American Battle of Quebec. He describes chairing a council of war with naval officers and militia colonels to resolve “that the town should be defended to the last,” arranging for the Lizard and Hunter sloops to winter in Quebec and furnish men to bolster the garrison, and personally supervising the repair of merlons, embrasures and the mounting of over 140 artillery pieces. Caldwell also led the decisive sortie of December 31, 1775, which drove back Benedict Arnold’s forces and took some 400 prisoners. The same letter recounts extensive losses to his private property—his mill’s wheat and flour were seized, and his La Gorgendière residence was burned—amounting to roughly £2,000, for which he later petitioned the Crown as a “poor ruined farmer” loyal to the King.

His military service earned him the King's praise, financial reward and a seat in the Canadian parliament. In 1787 he was promoted to colonel of the Quebec Battalion of British Militia, a rank he held until June 1794. Described as 'a handsome soldier', Caldwell was supposed to be the inspiration for the character Colonel Ed Rivers in the novel The History of Emily Montague, by Frances Brooke.

Caldwell was a founder of the Agriculture Society (1791), serving as its chairman, to improve the breeding of livestock and the production of hemp in Quebec. In 1801, he purchased all the property that belonged to Governor Murray, establishing himself as an important seigneur, or landowner, and he bought further considerable tracts of land throughout Quebec. In January 1801, a public notice was issued announcing the sheriff’s sale of six acres of land in Caldwell Manor, seized following a court judgment in favor of Henry Caldwell. The land, originally granted by Caldwell to Andrew Liddel, was auctioned off at Saint-Armand after legal action taken against James and Robert Liddel. This event illustrates Caldwell’s active role as a landowner and creditor in Lower Canada’s seigneurial system.

From the mills he built he supplied the troops stationed in North America and bought boats, wharves and warehouses to produce, store and export his goods. In 1810 alone he sold more than 1,775,000 pounds of flour to the government for just under £22,000.

In 1804, as a result of the Napoleon's European blockade, Caldwell persuaded Henry Dundas, 1st Viscount Melville, the Lord of the Admiralty, to instead develop Canadian timber for the Royal Navy. His sawmills became the best known in Quebec and the Etchemin mills at the mouth of the Etchemin River were among the largest.

As a politician he was "a man of rather tempestuous nature and strong personality (and) he naturally found himself in conflict with the governors of the time." In 1784 he was appointed deputy receiver general. Under Governor Carleton he focused on improving the militia, highways, communications and later education. Ten years later, in 1794, he was sworn in as Receiver-General of Lower Canada with an annual salary of £400. He retained this position until 1808 when his son, John Caldwell, took over. Long after his death, in 1823, it was discovered that he had embezzled nearly £40,000 during the exercise of his duties, including almost £8,000 from the Jesuit estates, which he had managed as treasurer of the commission set up to administer them.

== Death ==
Henry Caldwell died May 28, 1810, at his home, Belmont, in Ste. Foy. His wife, Ann, died six years earlier. She was a daughter of Alexander Hamilton (d.1808) M.P., K.C., of Hampton Hall, County Dublin & Newtonhamilton, Co. Armagh. Her father represented Belfast in Parliament. Ann was the great-aunt of Chief Justice Edward Bowen who came to Quebec with the Caldwells. Henry left all his personal goods and property to his only son, except for the seigneury of Lauson, which he bequeathed to his grandson Henry John Caldwell, and what was left of Sans Bruit, which went to his granddaughter Ann Caldwell; he also left various gifts to relatives and friends.

== See also ==
- American Revolutionary War
- Former colonies and territories in Canada
- Invasion of Quebec (1775)
- Irish Quebecers
- Lower Canada
- Province of Quebec (1763–1791)
