= The History of Emily Montague =

Literary work by Frances Brooke

The History of Emily Montague, written by Frances Brooke and first published in 1769, is often considered the first Canadian novel. It is a sentimental novel written in the epistolary form. It also features some elements of a travelogue, as the main letter-writer responds to requests to describe the colony of Canada in detail. The plot of the novel is a love story, but along the way Brooke includes many reflections on social norms and the relations between the English, French (habitant), Huron, and Iroquois cultures in Quebec.

== Main characters ==
The main letter-writers in the novel are Emily Montague, Colonel William Fermor, Colonel Ed Rivers (possibly inspired by Henry Caldwell), and Arabella Fermor. Of these, Emily is the main heroine, but Arabella has typically captured more readers' attention, for being a bold and witty foil to the demure and shy Emily.

== Composition and publication ==
Brooke wrote the novel while she was living at the Jesuit House of Sillery (French: maison des Jésuites-de-Sillery) in Sillery, Quebec from 1763 to 1768, shortly after the Battle of the Plains of Abraham. The book was first published in 1769 when Brooke returned to England, by James Dodsley.

== Reception ==
On its first publication, the novel received positive reviews in the most notable journals, and was reprinted in several editions during Brooke's lifetime. The book was generally overlooked in the nineteenth century, in part because few copies were available. In 1921, an article by literary scholar Charles Blue, "Canada's First Novelist," made the case that the book was worth serious study, and since then it has been considered an important part of the canon of Canadian literature.

=== Status as first Canadian novel ===
The History of Emily Montague is the first novel written in Canada, and the first novel featuring a Canadian setting. However, some contest its status as a Canadian novel because the author was English and only lived in Canada for five years, and the book was published in London. Moreover, because the novel pre-dates the Confederation of Canada as an independent country in 1867, some have argued that it (and all pre-1867 literature from the region), should be considered colonial literature, not Canadian literature.
