= Cecil Caldwell =

American football player (born 1977)

No. 96
- Position: Defensive tackle

Personal information
- Born: February 27, 1977 (age 49); Newberry, South Carolina, U.S.
- Listed height: 6 ft 1 in (1.85 m)
- Listed weight: 285 lb (129 kg)

Career information
- High school: Newberry (SC)
- College: South Carolina
- NFL draft: 2001: undrafted

Career history
- Cleveland Browns (2001–2002); → Berlin Thunder (2002); Los Angeles Avengers (2003); Orlando Predators (2004–2005); Grand Rapids Rampage (2005); Philadelphia Soul (2006)
- Stats at ArenaFan.com

Cecil Caldwell (born February 27, 1977) is an American former football offensive lineman/defensive lineman in the Arena Football League (AFL) who played for the Los Angeles Avengers, Orlando Predators, Grand Rapids Rampage, and Philadelphia Soul.

== College career ==
Caldwell attended the University of South Carolina, and finished his college career with 14.5 sacks and 189 tackles. As a senior, he was also voted a team captain.

Pre-draft measurables
Height	Weight
6 ft 1 1/8 in (1.86 m)	268 lb (122 kg)
Values from NFL Combine

== Personal life ==
Caldwell's son is Oregon defensive tackle Jamaree Caldwell.
