= Robert Caldwell (disambiguation) =

Robert Caldwell (1814–1891) was a British missionary and linguist.

Robert Caldwell may also refer to:

- Robert Caldwell (academic) (1843–1914), master of Corpus Christi College, Cambridge
- Robert Porter Caldwell (1821–1885), American representative from Tennessee
- Robert Caldwell (Australian politician) (1843–1909), South Australian politician
- Robert Caldwell (Wisconsin politician) (1866–1950), American farmer, businessman, and politician
- Robert Caldwell (footballer) (1909–?), English footballer
- Robert R. Caldwell, American theoretical physicist
- Robert Granville Caldwell (1882–1976), American historian, author, and diplomat
- Bobby Caldwell (1951–2023), American musician
- Bobby Caldwell (drummer) (born 1951), American drummer
- Bobby Caldwell, a character in Ocean's Thirteen
- Dr. Robert Caldwell, a character on St. Elsewhere portrayed by Mark Harmon
