= Arthur Caldwell =

Arthur Caldwell may refer to:

- Arthur Caldwell (Australian footballer) (1886–1915), Australian rules footballer
- Arthur Caldwell (footballer, born 1913) (1913–1989), English footballer

== See also ==
- Arthur Calwell (1896–1973), Australian politician
