= Ben Caldwell =

Ben Caldwell may refer to:

- Ben Caldwell (cartoonist) (born 1973), American cartoonist
- Ben Caldwell (filmmaker) (born 1945), American arts educator and filmmaker
- Ben F. Caldwell (1848–1924), U.S. Representative from Illinois

== See also ==
- Benjamin Caldwell (1739–1820), Royal Navy Officer
- Benjamin Rollins Caldwell (born 1983), American artist
