= Lewis A. H. Caldwell =

American politician, writer, and businessman

Lewis A. H. Caldwell (October 12, 1905 – September 30, 1993) was an American politician, writer, and businessman.

Lewis was born in Chicago, Illinois. He graduated from Englewood High School and was an Eagle Scout. He received his bachelor's and master's degrees from Northwestern University. He wrote newspaper columns and a book, "The Policy King," in 1946. He worked in public relations for the dairy industry and as a probation officer for Cook County, Illinois. Caldwell was active in the Democratic Party. Caldwell served in the Illinois House of Representatives from 1965 to 1973. He died at the South Shore Hospital in Chicago, Illinois,
