= HMS Melampus (1820) =

Fifth-rate frigate of the Royal Navy

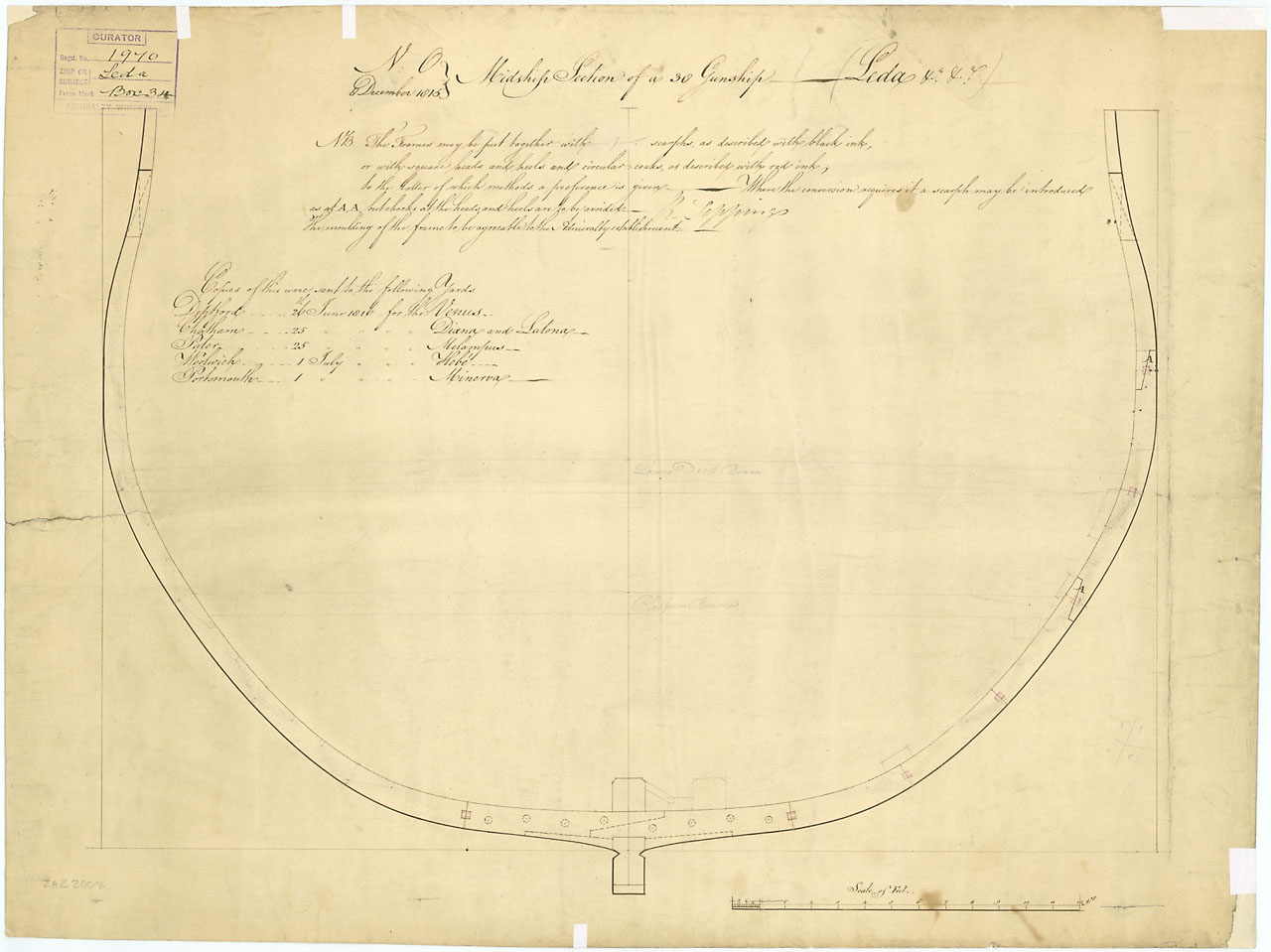
- Plan showing the midship section for Melampus

History

United Kingdom
- Name: Melampus
- Namesake: Melampus
- Ordered: 1 May 1815
- Builder: Pembroke Dockyard
- Laid down: August 1817
- Launched: 18 August 1820
- Completed: 18 May 1845
- Commissioned: 12 March 1845
- Fate: Sold for scrap, 3 April 1906

General characteristics
- Class & type: Modified Leda-class frigate
- Tons burthen: 1088 56/94 bm
- Length: 151 ft 10 in (46.3 m) (gundeck); 127 ft 1 in (38.7 m) (keel)
- Beam: 40 ft 6 in (12.3 m)
- Draught: 14 ft 7 in (4.4 m)
- Depth: 12 ft 9 in (3.9 m)
- Sail plan: Full-rigged ship
- Complement: 315
- Armament: 46 guns: Upper gundeck: 28 × 18-pdr cannon; Quarterdeck: 14 × 32-pdr carronades; Forecastle: 2 × 9-pdr cannon and 2 × 32-pdr carronades

HMS Melampus was a 46-gun modified Leda-class fifth-rate frigate built for the Royal Navy during the 1810s. Completed in 1820, she was not commissioned until 1845 for the South America Station and was converted into a store and receiving ship in 1855. The ship was briefly assigned as a coast guard ship before being paid off in 1858. Melampus was converted into a Roman Catholic chapel ship in 1866 and then became a store ship twenty years later. The ship was sold for scrap in 1906.

== Description ==
Melampus had a length at the gundeck of 151 feet 10 inches (46.3 m) and 127 feet 1 inch (38.7 m) at the keel. She had a beam of 40 feet 6 inches (12.3 m), a draught of 14 feet 7 inches (4.4 m) and a depth of hold of 12 feet 9 inches (3.9 m). The ship's tonnage was 1088 56/94 tons burthen. The modified Leda-class frigates were armed with twenty-eight 18-pounder cannon on her gundeck, fourteen 32-pounder carronades on her quarterdeck and a pair of 9-pounder cannon and two more 32-pounder carronades in forecastle. The ship had a crew of 315 officers and ratings.

== Construction and career ==
Melampus, the second ship of her name to serve in the Royal Navy, was ordered on 1 May 1816, laid down in August 1817 at Pembroke Dockyard, Wales, and launched on 10 August 1820. She was completed for ordinary at Plymouth Dockyard 2–23 September 1829 and was roofed over from the mainmast forward. The ship cost £23,007 to build and £7,072 to fit out for ordinary. She was fitted out for sea at a total cost of £9,156 from March to 18 May 1845.

Melampus's first commission began on 12 March with Captain John Campbell in command and she was ready for sea on 18 May.
