= John Caldwell (seigneur) =

Sir John Caldwell (bap. 25 February 1775 – 26 October 1842) was a businessman and politician in Lower Canada and the only son of Henry Caldwell, the receiver-general of Lower Canada from 1794.

John grew up near Quebec City on the family estate which was one of the properties his father, Henry Caldwell, had obtained from Governor James Murray by way of a 99-year lease. He studied at Trinity College, Dublin and was called to the bar in 1798. He never practiced law as he was administering his father's assets and ongoing business affairs. In 1800, he ran for, and was elected in the riding of Dorchester along with Jean-Thomas Taschereau for the 3rd Parliament of Lower Canada. Aside from an irregularity concerning the 1809 election, he served until December 1811, when he gave up his seat in the Legislative Assembly.

Caldwell was immediately appointed to the Legislative Council of Lower Canada where he served until his death. Caldwell died at the Tremont House in Boston, Massachusetts in 1842 and is buried in the hotel's lot at Mount Auburn Cemetery.

His son Henry John also represented Dorchester in the legislative assembly.
