= 1913–14 Woolwich Arsenal F.C. season =

English football club season

Woolwich Arsenal
1913–14 season
- Chairman: Henry Norris
- Manager: George Morrell
- Stadium: Highbury
- Second Division: 3rd
- FA Cup: 2nd Round
Home colours	Away colours

In the 1913–14 season, the Woolwich Arsenal F.C. played 38 games, of which it won 20, drew 9 and lost 9. The team finished 3rd in the league. It was their first game back in the Second Division after being relegated in the 1912-13 season for the first and only time in the team's history.

== Results ==
Arsenal's score comes first

Win	Draw	Loss

=== Football League Second Division ===
Date	Opponent	Venue	Result	Attendance	Scorers
6 September 1913	Leicester Fosse	H	2–1		
13 September 1913	Wolverhampton Wanderers	A	2–1		
15 September 1913	Notts County	H	3–0		
20 September 1913	Hull City	H	0–0		
27 September 1913	Barnsley	A	0–1		
4 October 1913	Bury	H	0–1		
11 October 1913	Huddersfield Town	A	2–1		
18 October 1913	Lincoln City	H	3–0		
25 October 1913	Blackpool	A	1–1		
1 November 1913	Nottingham Forest	H	3–2		
8 November 1913	Fulham	A	1–6		
15 November 1913	Grimsby Town	A	1–1		
22 November 1913	Birmingham	H	1–0		
29 November 1913	Bristol City	A	1–1		
6 December 1913	Leeds City	H	1–0		
13 December 1913	Clapton Orient	A	0–1		
20 December 1913	Glossop North End	H	2–0		
25 December 1913	Bradford Park Avenue	A	3–2		
26 December 1913	Bradford Park Avenue	H	2–0		
27 December 1913	Leicester Fosse	A	2–1		
1 January 1914	Notts County	A	0–1		
3 January 1914	Wolverhampton Wanderers	H	3–1		
17 January 1914	Hull City	A	2–1		
24 January 1914	Barnsley	H	1–0		
7 February 1914	Bury	A	1–1		
14 February 1914	Huddersfield Town	H	0–1		
21 February 1914	Lincoln City	A	2–5		
28 February 1914	Blackpool	H	2–1		
7 March 1914	Nottingham Forest	A	0–0		
14 March 1914	Fulham	H	2–0		
28 March 1914	Birmingham	A	0–2		
4 April 1914	Bristol City	H	1–1		
10 April 1914	Stockport County	A	0–2		
11 April 1914	Leeds City	A	0–0		
13 April 1914	Stockport County	H	4–0		
18 April 1914	Clapton Orient	H	2–2		
23 April 1914	Grimsby Town	H	2–0		
25 April 1914	Glossop North End	A	2–0		

==== Final League table ====
Pos	Team	Pld	W	D	L	GF	GA	GAv	Pts	Promotion or relegation
1	Notts County (C, P)	38	23	7	8	77	36	2.139	53	Promotion to the First Division
2	Bradford (Park Avenue) (P)	38	23	3	12	71	47	1.511	49	Promotion to the First Division
3	Woolwich Arsenal	38	20	9	9	54	38	1.421	49	
4	Leeds City	38	20	7	11	76	46	1.652	47	
5	Barnsley	38	19	7	12	51	45	1.133	45	

(C) Champions; (P) Promoted

=== FA Cup ===
Round	Date	Opponent	Venue	Result	Attendance	Goalscorers
R1	10 January 1914	Bradford City	A	0–2		
