= Frances Brooke =

English author of first Canadian novel (1724–1789)

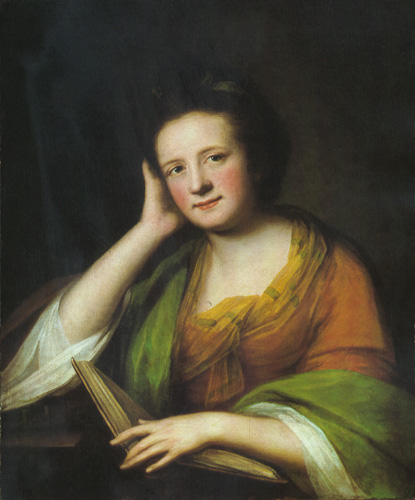
- Frances Brooke by Catherine Read ca. 1771
- Born: Frances Moore; 12 January 1724; Claypole, Lincolnshire, England
- Died: 23 January 1789 (aged 65); Sleaford, Lincolnshire, England
- Occupation: English-Canadian writer

Frances Brooke (née Moore; 12 January 1724 – 23 January 1789) was an English novelist, essayist, playwright and translator. Hers was the first English novel known to have been written in Canada.

== Biography ==
Frances Moore was born in Claypole, Lincolnshire, England, the daughter of a clergyman. She was only three years old when her father died. Her mother's death followed soon after.

By the late 1740s, she had moved to London, where she embarked on her career as a poet and playwright. She did not drew attention until she published her essay serial The Old Maid. Under the pseudonym of Mary Singleton, Spinster, she edited 37 issues of this weekly periodical (1755–1756), which was patterned after The Spectator.

In 1756, she married Rev. Dr John Brooke, rector at Colney, Norfolk. The following year he left for Canada as a military chaplain while his wife remained in England. In 1763, she wrote her first novel, The History of Lady Julia Mandeville. In the same year Brooke sailed to Quebec, Canada, to join her husband, who was then chaplain to the British garrison there. In autumn 1768, she returned to London, where she continued her writing.

Brooke was well-known in London's literary and theatrical communities. In 1769, she published The History of Emily Montague, the first novel written in Canada. This brief stint in North America has caused some critics to label her "the first novelist in North America." Evidence of Brooke's wisdom and experience of life and its vicissitudes is apparent in her writing. One exemplary observation reflects that "It is a painful consideration, my dear, that the happiness or misery of our lives are generally determined before we are proper judges of either." Another reviewer recommended it for young ladies and praised the writer for her "art of engaging the attention by a lively stile, a happy descriptive talent, characters well-marked, and a variety of tender and delicate sentiments".

Also in 1769, Frances Brooke's novel The History of Emily Montague was used in the earliest Oxford English Dictionary citation for the hyperbolic or figurative sense of "literally"; the sentence from the novel was, "He is a fortunate man to be introduced to such a party of fine women at his arrival; it is literally to feed among the lilies." The citation was still used in the OED's 2011 revision.

Brooke died in Sleaford, England, aged 65.

== Works ==
- Letters from Juliet Lady Catesby to her friend, Lady Henrietta Campley, 1760 (translation from the original French by Marie-Jeanne Riccoboni, 1759)
- The History of Lady Julia Mandeville – 1763
- The History of Emily Montague. London: J. Dodsley, 1769
- The Excursion – 1777
- The Siege of Sinopoe – 1781
- Rosina: A Comic Opera, in Two Acts – 1783
- Marian: A Comic Opera, in Two Acts – 1788
- The History of Charles Mandeville – 1790

== Studies of Brooke's works ==
Most entries are from Selected Bibliography: Frances Moore Brooke by Jessica Smith and Paula Backscheider, which also refers to editions of Frances Brooke's works and to full-length critical monographs and biographical studies of the author.

- Raeleen Chai-Elsholz, "Textual Allusions and Narrative Voice in the Lettres de Milady Juliette Catesby and its English Translation [by Frances Moore Brooke]", in La traduction du discours amoureux (1660–1830), eds. Annie Cointre, Florence Lautel-Ribstein, Annie Rivara.
- Juliet McMaster, "Young Jane Austen and the First Canadian Novel: From Emily Montague to 'Amelia Webster' and Love and Friendship", Eighteenth-Century Fiction 11 (April 1999), pp. 339–346
- Robert James Merrett, "Signs of Nationalism in The History of Emily Montague, Canadians of Old and the Imperialist: Cultural Displacement and the Semiotics of Wine", Semiotic Inquiry 14 (1994), pp. 235–250
- Robin Howells, "Dialogism in Canada's First Novel: The History of Emily Montague", Canadian Review of Comparative Literature 20 (1993), pp. 437–450
- Dermot McCarthy, "Sisters Under the Mink: The Correspondent Fear in The History of Emily Montague", Essays on Canadian Writing 51–52 (Winter/Spring 1993), pp. 340–357
- Jane Sellwood, "'A Little Acid Is Absolutely Necessary': Narrative as Coquette in Frances Brooke's The History of Emily Montague", Canadian Literature 136 (1993), pp. 60–79
- Barbara M. Benedict, "The Margins of Sentiment: Nature, Letter, and Law in Frances Brooke's Epistolary Novels," ARIEL: A Review of International English Literature 23, no. 3 (July 1992), pp. 7–25
- Robert Merrett, "The Politics of Romance in The History of Emily Montague [sic]", Canadian Literature 133 (Summer 1992), pp. 92–108
- Frances Teague, "Frances Brooke's Imagined Epistles", Studies on Voltaire and the Eighteenth Century 304 (1992): 711–712
- K. J. H. Berland, "A Tax on Old Maids and Bachelors: Frances Brooke's Old Maid", Eighteenth-Century Women and Arts, ed. Frederick Keener and Susan Lorsch (New York: Greenwood Press, 1988), pp. 29–35
- Lorraine McMullen, "Frances Brooke's Old Maid: New Ideas in Entertaining Form", Studies on Voltaire and the Eighteenth Century (1989), pp. 669–670
- Barbara Godard, "Listening for the Silence: Native Women's Traditional Narratives", The Native in Literature, ed. Thomas King, Cheryl Calver, and Helen Hoy (Toronto: ECW Press, 1987), pp. 133–158
- K. J. H. Berland, "The True Epicurean Philosopher: Some Influences on Frances Brooke's History of Emily Montague", Dalhousie Review 66 (1986), pp. 286–300
- Ann Edwards Boutelle, "Frances Brooke's Emily Montague (1769): Canada and Woman's Rights", Women's Studies: An Interdisciplinary Journal 12 (1986), pp. 7–16
- Katherine M. Rogers, "Dreams and Nightmares: Male Characters in the Feminine Novel of the Eighteenth Century", Men by Women, ed. Janet Todd, Women in Literature, n.s. 2 (New York: Holmes & Meier, 1982), pp. 9–24
- Lorraine McMullen, "Double Image: Frances Brooke's Women Characters", World Literature Written in English 21, no. 2 (Summer 1982), pp. 356–63
- Mary Jane Edwards, "Frances Brooke's The History of Emily Montague: A Biographical Context", English Studies in Canada 7, no. 2 (Summer 1981), pp. 171–182
- Konrad Gross, "The Image of French-Canada in Early English-Canadian Fiction", English Literature of the Dominions: Writings on Australia, Canada, and New Zealand, ed. Konrad Gross and Wolfgang Klooss (Wurzburg: Konighausen & Neuman, 1981), pp. 69–79
- Margaret Anne Doody, "George Eliot and the Eighteenth-Century Novel", Nineteenth-Century Fiction 35 (December 1980): 260–91.
- Mary Jane Edwards, "Frances Brooke's Politics and The History of Emily Montague", The Canadian Novel, ed. John Moss, vol 2, Beginnings (Toronto: ECW Press, 1980), 19–27
- Lorraine McMullen, "Frances Brooke's Early Fiction", Canadian Literature 86 (1980), 31–40
- Lorraine McMullen, "The Divided Self", Atlantis: A Women's Studies Journal 5 (1980), 53–67
- Linda Shohet, "An Essay on The History of Emily Montague", The Canadian Novel, ed. John Moss, vol. 2, Beginnings (Toronto: ECW Press, 1980), pp. 19–27
- Katherine M. Rogers, "Sensibility and Feminism: The Novels of Frances Brooke", Genre 11, no. 2 (Summer 1978): 159–71.
- Lorraine McMullen, "All's Right at Last: An Eighteenth-Century Canadian Novel", Journal of Canadian Fiction 21 (1978): 95–104.
- George Woodcock, "Possessing the Land: Notes on Canadian Fiction", The Canadian Imagination: Dimensions of a Literary Culture, ed. David Staines (Cambridge, Mass.: Harvard Univ. Press, 1977), pp. 69–96
- James J. Talman and Ruth Talman, "The Canadas 1736–1812", Literary History of Canada, 2nd edition, vol. 1, ed. Carl F. Klinck (Toronto: Univ. of Toronto Press, 1976), pp. 97–105
- Lorraine McMullen, "Frances Brooke and Memoirs of the Marquis de St. Forlaix", Canadian Notes and Queries 18 (December 1976): pp. 8–9
- William H. New, "The Old Maid: Frances Brooke's Apprentice Feminism", Journal of Canadian Fiction 2, no. 3 (Summer 1973), pp. 9–12
- William H. New, "Frances Brooke's Chequered Gardens", Canadian Literature 52 (Spring 1972), pp. 24–38
- Gwendolyn Needham, "Mrs. Frances Brooke: Dramatic Critic", Theatre Notebook vol. 15 (Winter 1961): pp. 47–55
- Emile Castonguay, "Mrs. Frances Brooke ou la femme de lettres", Cinq Femmes et nous (Québec: Belisle, 1950), pp. 9–57
- Desmond Pacey, "The First Canadian Novel", Dalhousie Review 26 (July 1946), pp. 143–50
- Bertha M. Sterns, "Early English Periodicals for Ladies", PMLA 48 (1933), pp. 38–60
- James R. Foster, "The Abbé Prévost and the English Novel", PMLA 42 (1927), pp. 443–464
- Charles S. Blue, "Canada's First Novelist", Canadian Magazine 58 (November 1921), pp. 3–12
- Thomas Gutherie Marquis, "English-Canadian Literature", Canada and Its Provinces ed. Adam Shortt and Arthur Doughty (Toronto: Edinburgh Univ. Press, 1913), 12, pp. 493–589
- Ida Burwash, "An Old-Time Novel", Canadian Magazine 29 (January 1907), pp. 252–256
- James M. Lemoine, "The First Canadian Novelist, 1769", Maple Leaves 7 (1906), pp. 239–245

== Legacy ==
Brooke is widely seen by literary historians and critics as the first Canadian novelist for writing her 1769 work The History of Emily Montague. Her literary reception is based mostly on this publication. It was popular among scholars after its recovery, with more than a dozen scholarly articles written on its subject matter by 2004. Modern paperback reprints include a definitive scholarly edition. Critics of Brooke have studied themes present in Emily Montague, such as applying free-trade imperialism to 18th-century Canada, proto-feminism, and displacing the French Catholic threat in British Columbian colonies.

While the purpose and material of Emily Montague are often debated among critics, its reception as a work is largely neutral to negative. Recent critics such as Dermot McCarthy concede that "Brooke's inability to imagine her ambivalence... is understandable given her time and background.... However, her failure should not be endorsed." Desmond Pacey, in his Essays in Canadian Criticism writes that "Emily Montague's artistic shortcomings are obvious: the plot is thin, conventional, repetitive, and poorly integrated with the informative sections of the book; the style is generally stilted and monotonous; the characters, with one or two exceptions, are traditional in conception and deficient in life; the whole performance is heavily didactic and sentimental." Juliet McMaster cites Emily Montague as a source of inspiration and parody for Jane Austen's Love and Freindship, but states that overall, "Emily Montague is no mean literary achievement." Even in its own time, views divided on its value. The Monthly Review in its September 1769 issue wrote that its "frost pieces... decorate a short story which has nothing extraordinary in it." While Brooke is promoted as a Canadian novelist, Benet's Reader's Encyclopedia entry notes how "Brooke's work was based on English models and had no perceptible effect on Canadian literature."

Other Brooke works, such as her 1777 novel The Excursion, have received scholarly interest for their pastoral traditions and their political satire against the English theatre industry of the 18th century, while some of her works such as her 1781 play The Siege of Sinopoe have close to no reception. Brooke's personal life is the subject of a number of scholarly journals, mostly on her relations with actors David Garrick and Mary Ann Yates. Brooke herself was the subject of her own monograph, and in recent years has gained popularity as the "destroyer of English (not literally)" after an online article published by the University of Pennsylvania, which regards Brooke as being used in the earliest Oxford English Dictionary citation of the hyperbolic use of the word "literally" to mean "figuratively".

In 1985, the International Astronomical Union's Working Group for Planetary System Nomenclature, approving 337 names for features on the surface of Venus, honoured Brooke by naming a crater after her.
