= Andrew Caldwell =

Andrew Caldwell may refer to:

- Andrew Caldwell (actor) (born 1989), American actor
- Andrew Jackson Caldwell (1837–1906), U.S. Representative from Tennessee
- Drew Caldwell (born 1960), Canadian politician
- Andy Caldwell (fl. 2000s), American electronic house music DJ and producer
