= George Caldwell =

George Caldwell may refer to:

- George Caldwell (cricketer) (1807–1863), English cricketer
- George Caldwell (Florida politician) (1933–2014), American politician from Florida
- George Caldwell (Kentucky politician) (1814–1866), American politician from Kentucky
- George Caldwell (Louisiana official) (1892–1966), American contractor from Louisiana
- George Caldwell (Wisconsin politician) (1840–1933), American politician from Wisconsin
- George Chapman Caldwell (1834–1907), American chemist, horticulturalist and instructor

== See also ==
- George Cadwell (1773–1826), American politician
