= Henry John Caldwell =

Canadian politician

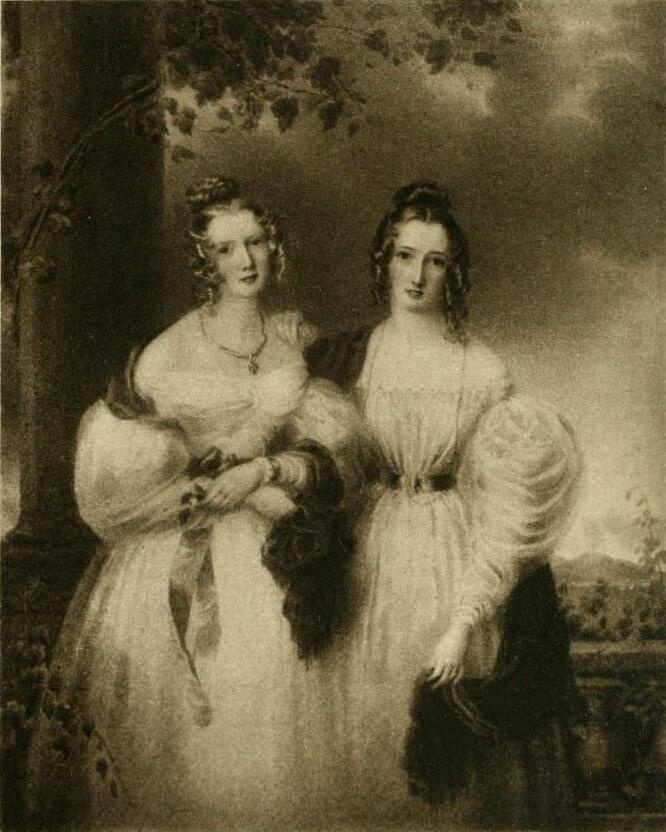
Caldwell's wife Sophia and her sister, Rose

Sir Henry John Caldwell (October 22, 1801 – October 13, 1858) was a seigneur and political figure in Lower Canada and Canada East (now Quebec.) He represented Dorchester in the Legislative Assembly of Lower Canada from 1830 to 1834.

He was born in Quebec City, the son of John Caldwell, who was the son of Henry Caldwell, and Jane Davidson. Caldwell inherited the seigneury of Lauzon after the death of his grandfather. In 1807 he entered Trinity College, Dublin.He was educated at Trinity College, Dublin. He was named a justice of the peace in 1816. Caldwell married Sophia Louisa Paynter, the niece of Matthew Whitworth-Aylmer. In 1826, the seigneury of Lauzon was sold to clear his father's debts, even though it had not been part of his father's property; Caldwell's appeal was unsuccessful. He later operated a sawmill in the seigneury of Île-Verte with William Price and Louis Bertrand. Caldwell voted against the Ninety-Two Resolutions. Caldwell inherited the title of baronet from his father, the title became extinct on his death.
