= Bruce Caldwell (rugby union) =

Australian rugby union player

- Born: Bruce Cliff Caldwell; 17 October 1908 Randwick, New South Wales
- Died: c. 1975

Rugby union career
- Position: centre
International career
Years	Team	Apps	(Points)
1928	Wallabies	1	(0)

Bruce Cliff Caldwell (17 October 1908 – c. 1975) was a rugby union player who represented Australia.

Caldwell, a centre, was born in Randwick, New South Wales and claimed 1 international rugby cap for Australia.
