= Thomas Caldwell =

Thomas Caldwell may refer to:

- Thomas Caldwell (soldier) (1894–1969), Scottish recipient of the Victoria Cross
- Thomas Boyd Caldwell (1856–1932), Canadian politician
- Thomas Caldwell (sport shooter), competed in the 1908 Summer Olympics
- Tommy Caldwell (born 1978), American rock climber
- Tommy Caldwell (footballer) (1885–1967), English footballer
- Tommy Caldwell (musician) (1949–1980), bassist/vocalist for the Marshall Tucker Band
- Tom Caldwell (1921–2002), Irish politician, interior designer, and art dealer
- Thomas Wakem Caldwell (1867–1937), farmer and political figure in New Brunswick, Canada
