= Samuel Caldwell =

Samuel Caldwell may refer to:

- Samuel H. Caldwell (1904–1960), American electrical engineer
- Samuel R. Caldwell (1880–1941), first American citizen convicted under the 1937 Marijuana Tax Act
- Samuel Richard Caldwell (1813–1905), Canadian politician
- Sam Caldwell (1892–1953), American oilman and Louisiana politician

== See also ==
- Samuel Caldwell House, located in Caldwell, Ohio
