= Charles Caldwell =

Charles Caldwell may refer to:

- Charles Caldwell (bluesman) (1943–2003), American blues musician
- Charles Caldwell (physician) (1772–1853), American physician, founder University of Louisville School of Medicine
- Charles Caldwell (politician) (died 1875), political leader in Reconstruction-era Mississippi
- Charles Henry Bromedge Caldwell (1823–1877), United States Navy officer during the American Civil War
- C. Pope Caldwell (1875–1940), American politician from the state of New York
- Charlie Caldwell (1901–1957), American baseball pitcher and football coach
