= Jamaree Caldwell =

American football player (born 2000)

No. 99 – Los Angeles Chargers
- Position: Defensive tackle
- Roster status: Active

Personal information
- Born: August 30, 2000 (age 26); Newberry, South Carolina, U.S.
- Listed height: 6 ft 1 in (1.85 m)
- Listed weight: 340 lb (154 kg)

Career information
- High school: Newberry (SC)
- College: Independence (2021); Houston (2022–2023); Oregon (2024)
- NFL draft: 2025: 3rd round, 86th overall pick

Career history
- Los Angeles Chargers (2025–present)

Awards and highlights
- Second-team All-Big 12 (2023)

Career NFL statistics as of Week 5, 2026
- Total tackles: 42
- Sacks: 1
- Forced fumbles: 1
- Pass deflections: 1
- Stats at Pro Football Reference

Jamaree Caldwell (born August 30, 2000) is an American professional football defensive tackle for the Los Angeles Chargers of the National Football League (NFL). He played college football for the Independence Pirates, Houston Cougars and Oregon Ducks. Caldwell was selected by the Chargers in the third round of the 2025 NFL draft.

== Early life ==
Caldwell attended Newberry High School in Newberry, South Carolina. He committed to play college football at Hutchinson Community College, but due to the COVID-19 pandemic he was taken off scholarship. Caldwell later headed to Independence Community College to play college football.

== College career ==
=== Independence CC ===
In his one season at Independence CC in 2021, Caldwell appeared in four games where he notched seven tackles with three being for a loss, and half a sack.

=== Houston ===
Caldwell committed to play Division I football for the Houston Cougars. In his first season with Houston in 2022 he totaled 12 tackles with three and a half being for a loss, and two sacks. In 2023, Caldwell totaled 27 tackles with eight and a half being for a loss, and six and a half sacks, earning second-team all-Big 12 Conference honors. After the season, he entered his name into the NCAA transfer portal.

=== Oregon ===
Caldwell transferred to play for the Oregon Ducks. In 2024, he notched 29 tackles with five being for a loss, three pass deflections, and a forced fumble for the Ducks. After the season, Caldwell declared for the 2025 NFL draft.

== Professional career ==
Pre-draft measurables
Height	Weight	Arm length	Hand span	Wingspan	40-yard dash	10-yard split	20-yard split	Vertical jump
6 ft 2 1/8 in (1.88 m)	332 lb (151 kg)	32 in (0.81 m)	9 3/8 in (0.24 m)	6 ft 6 3/8 in (1.99 m)	5.16 s	1.86 s	3.05 s	27.0 in (0.69 m)
All values from NFL Combine

Caldwell was selected by the Los Angeles Chargers in the third round, with the 86th pick of the 2025 NFL draft.

== NFL career statistics ==
=== Regular season ===
Year	Team	Games		Tackles					Interceptions						Fumbles				
Year	Team	GP	GS	Cmb	Solo	Ast	Sck	TFL	Int	Yds	Avg	Lng	TD	PD	FF	Fum	FR	Yds	TD
2025	LAC	17	5	31	14	17	1.0	5	0	0	0.0	0	0	1	1	0	0	0	0
Career		17	5	31	14	17	1.0	5	0	0	0.0	0	0	1	1	0	0	0	0

=== Postseason ===
Year	Team	Games		Tackles					Interceptions						Fumbles				
Year	Team	GP	GS	Cmb	Solo	Ast	Sck	TFL	Int	Yds	Avg	Lng	TD	PD	FF	Fum	FR	Yds	TD
2025	LAC	1	1	3	2	1	0.0	0	0	0	0.0	0	0	0	0	0	0	0	0
Career		1	1	3	2	1	0.0	0	0	0	0.0	0	0	0	0	0	0	0	0

== Personal life ==
Caldwell is the son of former South Carolina defensive lineman Cecil Caldwell.
