= SMTC Corporation =

- Type: Private (since 2021); Public (2000-21)
- Traded as: Nasdaq: SMTX (2000-21)
- Industry: Electronics
- Founded: Toronto, Ontario, Canada (1985)
- Headquarters: Markham, Ontario
- Key people: Ed Smith (President and (CEO)
- Products: Electronics manufacturing services
- Revenue: ▲US$ 296.3 Million USD (2012)
- Net income: ▲US$ 7.542.7 Million USD (2012)
- Number of employees: 2300 (2012)
- Website: www.smtc.com

SMTC Corporation (Surface Mount Technology Centre), founded in 1985, is a mid-size end-to-end electronics manufacturing services (EMS) company. SMTC facilities operate in the United States, Canada, Mexico, and China.

== History ==
- 1985 - Surface Mount founded in Toronto, Ontario
- 1990 - HTM established in Denver, Colorado
- July 1999 - merger of Surface Mount and HTM
- 1999 - purchased Zenith Electronics' facility in Chihuahua, Mexico, SMTC's only site with unionized employees
- September 1999 - acquired W. F. Wood of Boston, Massachusetts
- July 2000 - acquired EMS company, Pensar Electronic Solutions of Appleton, Wisconsin
- July 21, 2000 - IPO
- November 2000 - acquired Qualtron Teoranta of Donegal, Ireland, and subsidiary in Haverhill, Massachusetts
- March 2002 - Closed down its Cork City, Ireland manufacturing plant with the loss of 200 jobs due to its main customer going into administration.
- August 2003 - Sold EMS company, Pensar Electronics Solutions of Appleton, Wisconsin back to the original owners. The original owners decided to buy the company back after hearing plans that SMTC was planning on shutting the plant down.
- February 2010 - SMTC regained compliance with Nasdaq requirements, after Nasdaq notified the company for failing to maintain a minimum bid price of $1.00 on September 15, 2009.
- November 8, 2018 - acquires contract manufacturer MC Assembly
- April 2021 - H.I.G. Capital acquired SMTC for US $172 million and its stock was delisted from Nasdaq.
