= Caldwell baronets =

Extinct baronetcy in the Baronetage of Ireland

The Caldwell Baronetcy of Wellsborough, County Fermanagh was created in the Baronetage of Ireland on 23 June 1683 for James Caldwell, High Sheriff of County Fermanagh in 1677. He owned Castle Caldwell at Templecarne, Co Fermanagh and also bought the estate at Wellsborough.

Sir James Caldwell, 4th Baronet fought as an officer in the Austrian Army, was made Deputy Governor of Fermanagh in 1752, elected a Fellow of the Royal Society in 1753 and was High Sheriff of Fermanagh in 1756. His son Sir John Caldwell, 5th Baronet fought in the British Army in India, was Governor of County Fermanagh in 1793 and High Sheriff of Fermanagh in 1798.

Sir John Caldwell, 6th Baronet, lived in Canada, where he was Treasurer General of Canada. His son, the 7th baronet, returned to England and died childless.

== Caldwell baronets of Wellsborough, Fermanagh (1683) ==
- Sir James Caldwell, 1st Baronet (by 1634–c. 1717)
- Sir Henry Caldwell, 2nd Baronet (died c. 1726)
- Sir John Caldwell, 3rd Baronet (died 1744)
- Sir James Caldwell, 4th Baronet (c.1722–1784)
- Sir John Caldwell, 5th Baronet (1756–1830)
- Sir John Caldwell, 6th Baronet (1775–1842)
- Sir Henry John Caldwell, 7th Baronet (1801–1858) Baronetcy extinct on his death.
