= Colbert Caldwell =

American judge (1822–1892)

Charles Colbert Caldwell

Associate Justice of the Supreme Court of Texas
- In office September 1867 – October 1869

Personal details
- Born: May 16, 1822 Shelbyville, Tennessee, U.S.
- Died: April 18, 1892 (aged 69) Fresno, California, U.S.
- Resting place: Winfield, Kansas
- Party: Republican
- Spouse: Martha Julia Michie
- Children: 8
- Occupation: Judge, lawyer

Charles Colbert Caldwell (sometimes reported as Coldwell; May 16, 1822 – April 18, 1892) was a justice of the Supreme Court of Texas from September 1867 to October 1869.

== Biography ==
=== Early life and military career ===
Charles Colbert Caldwell was born in Shelbyville, Tennessee on May 16, 1822. Nathaniel Caldwell, his father, died in 1831, leaving him in the custody of his grandparents, who were of decent financial means and afforded him a good education. When he was fourteen he joined either an uncle or a black servant on an excursion to Texas, where he attempted to enlist in General Sam Houston’s army; he was rejected, however, for being too young. Upon returning home he met Kit Carson, whom he befriended and joined on Carson’s expeditions across the American frontier. Caldwell got work as a merchant in Missouri and Santa Fe, which introduced him to the Spanish language.

He met Alexander W. Doniphan in St. Louis, Missouri and made another attempt to enlist (this one successful) at the age of seventeen. He became a member of Doniphan's staff during the Mexican-American War and travelled with Doniphan's forces down to Mexico. He received the nickname Tobe and carried dispatches from Mexico to Washington. In November of 1851 he was appointed adjutant-general of Arkansas to replace Allen Wood, who had resigned.

=== Political and legal career ===
After passing the Tennessee bar in 1846 Caldwell opened up a practice in St. Francis County, Arkansas but moved to Texas in 1859, where he purchased at least eleven slaves. On August 23 1865, Texas governor Andrew Jackson Hamilton appointed Caldwell to the Seventh Judicial District. General Philip H. Sheridan then appointed Caldwell an associate justice of the Texas Supreme Court on October 18, 1867.

Caldwell wanted African Americans to have the right to vote; in the aftermath of the American Civil War he was regarded as a Radical Republican but was deemed a moderate by 1868. Starting in 1866, to gather support for his own effort to become a delegate to the upcoming 1868–1869 convention to draft a new state constitution for Texas, as well as for the convention itself, Caldwell hosted rallies. On December 31, 1867, a lynch mob arrived at Marshall, Texas, where Caldwell was delivering a speech to an African American crowd in which he "took full grounds for reconstruction under the Congressional plan", and attempted to kill Caldwell; Caldwell survived but was "badly frightened". He became a delegate and was nominated by Andrew Jackson Hamilton as a potential chairman of the convention but did not get the position, which instead went to Edmund J. Davis; Davis's views were more agreeable to radicals, but the moderate delegates thought Caldwell was "more dangerous than Davis". On July 3, 1868 the convention gave the task of going to Washington to give Congress a report on ongoing crime in Texas to Morgan C. Hamilton and Caldwell; the goal was to convince Congress to pass legislation that would give political positions to Republicans.

Radical Republicans continued to detest Caldwell for his moderate beliefs and alleged apathy toward freed slaves and Reconstruction; they convinced Joseph J. Reynolds, commander of the Texas military district, to oust Caldwell from his position in the Texas Supreme Court on October 31, 1869.

Caldwell was appointed collector of customs of El Paso, Texas in 1872.

=== Personal life and death ===
He married Martha Julia Michie, also from Tennessee, in 1847. They had eight children, six of whom lived to adulthood. He lived his later years in Winfield, Kansas.

On April 18, 1892, Caldwell, after having dinner with his daughter-in-law and his son N. C. Caldwell at N. C.'s house in Fresno, California, retired to the lounge, claiming he would have a few minutes' sleep. When his daughter-in-law entered the lounge to check on him, she found Colbert struggling for breath. He died shortly thereafter. He was sixty-nine, and the cause of death was determined to be heart failure. His remains were buried in Winfield.

His grandson, Colbert Coldwell, founded Coldwell Banker.

== Works cited ==
- Wallace, Ernest (1979). The Howling of the Coyotes: Reconstruction Efforts to Divide Texas. College Station, Texas: Texas A&M University Press. ISBN 978-0-89096-083-7.
- Kingston, Mike (1992). The Texas Almanac's Political History of Texas. Austin, Texas: Eakin Press. ISBN 978-0-89015-855-5.

Political offices
Preceded by James Denison	Justice of the Texas Supreme Court; 1867–1869	Succeeded by C. B. Sabin
