= Caldwell =

Caldwell may refer to:

== People ==
- Caldwell (surname)
- Caldwell (given name)
- Caldwell First Nation, a federally recognized First Nation in southern Ontario, Canada

== Places ==
=== Great Britain ===
- Caldwell, Derbyshire, a hamlet
- Caldwell, East Renfrewshire, an old country estate
- Caldwell, North Yorkshire, a village and civil parish

=== United States ===
- Caldwell Glacier, Alaska
- Caldwell, Arkansas, a city
- Caldwell, Idaho, a city
- Caldwell, Kansas, a city
- Caldwell Parish, Louisiana
- Caldwell Brook, Minnesota, a stream
- The Caldwells, New Jersey, three municipalities all with Caldwell in their name
  - Caldwell, New Jersey, a borough
- Town of Caldwell, renamed Lake George (town), New York in 1962
- Caldwell, Mecklenburg County, North Carolina, an unincorporated community
- Caldwell, Orange County, North Carolina, an unincorporated community
- Caldwell, Ohio, a village
- Caldwell, Texas, a city
- Caldwell Zoo, Texas, in the city of Tyler
- Caldwell, West Virginia, an unincorporated community
- Caldwell, Wisconsin, an unincorporated community
- Caldwell County (disambiguation)
- Caldwell Creek (disambiguation)
- Caldwell Township (disambiguation)

=== Elsewhere ===
- Mount Caldwell, Ellsworth Land, Antarctica
- Caldwell Peak, Ross Island (near Antarctica)
- Caldwell, New South Wales, Australia, a village
- Caldwell, Alberta, Canada
- Caldwell, Liberia, a settlement town
- Forward Operating Base Caldwell, Iraq, a former U.S. Army base

== Buildings ==
- Caldwell, East Renfrewshire, Scotland, a mansion
- Uplawmoor (GB&K) railway station, Uplawmoor, East Renfrewshire, Scotland, originally named Caldwell
- Caldwell Priory, Bedfordshire, England
- Caldwell Block, Ipswich, Massachusetts, US
- Caldwell Parsonage, Union, New Jersey, US
- Caldwell Hall (disambiguation)
- Caldwell House (disambiguation)

== Ships ==
- Caldwell-class destroyer, a class of six destroyers
  - USS Caldwell (DD-69), US Navy destroyer, 1917
- USS Caldwell (DD-605), US Navy destroyer, 1942

== Schools ==
- Caldwell University, Caldwell, New Jersey, US
- Caldwell Community College & Technical Institute, Hudson, North Carolina, US
- Caldwell School, Mobile, Alabama, US
- Caldwell High School (disambiguation)
- Caldwell Academy, Greensboro, North Carolina, US

== Other ==
- Caldwell baronets, an extinct title in the Baronetage of Ireland
- Caldwell catalogue of astronomical objects
- Caldwell Memorial Hospital, Lenoir, North Carolina, US
- Caldwell machine gun, 1915

== See also ==
- Cadwell (disambiguation)
- Calwell (disambiguation)
- Cardwell (disambiguation)
- Cauldwell (disambiguation)
