= Caldwell House =

Caldwell House may refer to:

in Singapore

- Caldwell House, Singapore, Singapore, a historical building at the CHIJMES complex in Singapore

in the United Kingdom

- Caldwell House, East Renfrewshire, Scotland, Category A listed building

in the United States

(sorted by state, then city/town)

- Caldwell House (McRae, Arkansas), listed on the National Register of Historic Places (NRHP) in White County
- James Caldwell House, Campbellsville, Kentucky, listed on the NRHP in Taylor County
- Caldwell House (Danville, Kentucky), listed on the NRHP in Boyle County
- Charles W. Caldwell House, Danville, Kentucky, listed on the NRHP in Boyle County
- W. Logan Caldwell Farmstead, Danville Kentucky, listed on the NRHP in Boyle County
- Caldwell House (Shelbyville, Kentucky), listed on the NRHP in Shelby County
- Caldwell House (Abbeville, Louisiana), listed on the NRHP in Vermilion Parish
- Caldwell-Cobb-Love House, Lincolnton, North Carolina, listed on the NRHP in Lincoln County
- Luther Henry Caldwell House, Lumberton, North Carolina, listed on the NRHP in Robeson County
- Samuel Caldwell House, Caldwell, Ohio, listed on the NRHP in Noble County
- Caldwell-Hampton-Boylston House, Columbia, South Carolina, listed on the NRHP in Richland County
- W. A. Caldwell House, Brookings, South Dakota, listed on the NRHP in Brookings County
- William Parker Caldwell House, Gardner, Tennessee, listed on the NRHP in Weakley County
- Caldwell-Hopson House, Tiptonville, Tennessee, listed on the NRHP in Lake County
- Caldwell Lustron House, Union City, Tennessee, listed on the NRHP in Obion County
- Caldwell House (San Marcos, Texas), listed on the NRHP in Hayes County
