= USS Caldwell =

Two ships of the United States Navy have been named Caldwell, in honor of Lieutenant James R. Caldwell.

- USS Caldwell (DD-69), was the lead ship of the Caldwell class of destroyers, commissioned in 1917, served in World War I and decommissioned in 1922.
- USS Caldwell (DD-605), was a Benson-class destroyer, commissioned in 1942, served in World War II and decommissioned in 1946.
