= South Carolina Governor's Mansion =

Historic house in South Carolina, United States

- U.S. National Register of Historic Places
- U.S. Historic district – Contributing property
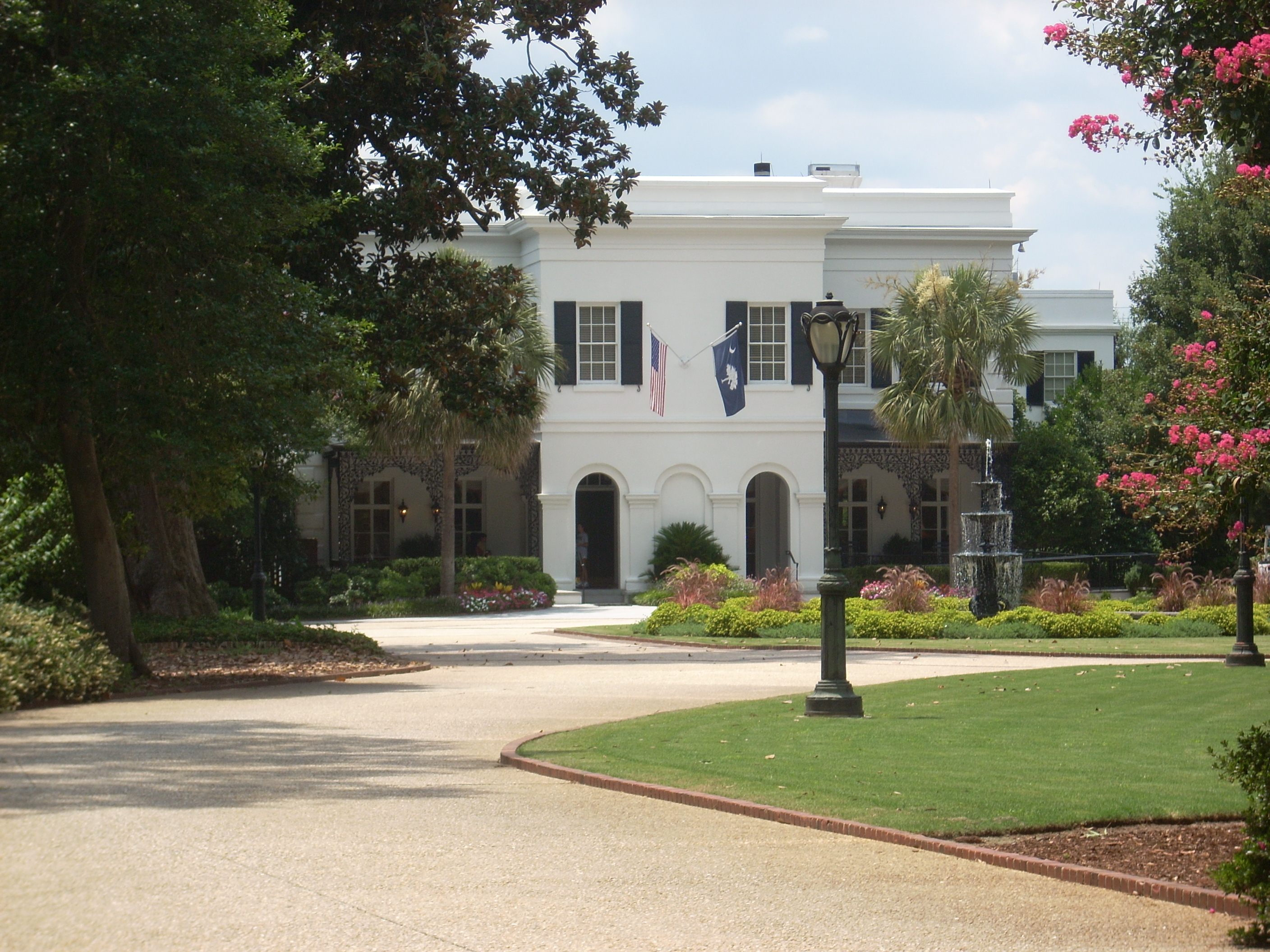

- Location within South Carolina Location within the United States
- Location: 800 Richland St., Columbia, Richland County, South Carolina
- Coordinates: 34°0′28″N 81°2′37″W
- Area: 9 acres (3.6 ha)
- Built: 1855
- Architect: attributed to George Edward Walker
- Architectural style: Federal; post-colonial
- Part of: Columbia Historic District I (ID71000798)
- NRHP reference No.: 70000597

The South Carolina Governor's Mansion (or the South Carolina Executive Mansion) is a historic U.S. governor's mansion in the Arsenal Hill neighborhood of Columbia, South Carolina and the official residence of the governor of South Carolina. It is a Federal style home influenced by British Colonial plantations. The building has a white stucco exterior and originally served as faculty quarters for the Arsenal Academy, which together with the Citadel Academy in Charleston formed the South Carolina Military Academy (now The Citadel). The Arsenal was burned along with the city of Columbia by Sherman's forces in February, 1865; the structure was the only surviving building and became South Carolina's executive mansion in 1868. On June 5, 1970, the building was registered with the U.S. National Register of Historic Places. The mansion is located on a single city block, and is surrounded by magnolia plants, elm and oak trees, and various other plants. It is accessed by a circular driveway around a fountain in front on the residence's main entrance. The building has a flat roof and a large central pavilion around the main entrance. The mansion has 15 rooms (excluding powder rooms, security and staff offices, and the kitchen). It is located in Columbia Historic District I. The mansion is currently occupied by Governor Henry McMaster and his family.

== History ==
=== 1800s ===
It is unknown who the building's original architect was, but George Edward Walker, who designed other buildings in the area is believed to have constructed the mansion. The mansion originally served as housing for officers as part of the state-supported Arsenal Military Academy; Columbia was burned by the Union Army commanded by William Tecumseh Sherman in 1865. The mansion was the only surviving building of the former academy complex. Governor James L. Orr designated the building as the official state governor's mansion in 1868. In 1869, $2,500 was used by local architect A. Y. Lee to make the property suitable as an executive residence. However, the money was depleted before the renovation was completed and Governor Robert K. Scott had to relocate into an unfinished house. Since 1868, only three governors of the state have not lived in the mansion, staying instead in their own private residences within Columbia. The first to do so, Daniel Henry Chamberlain, lived in a nearby mansion, most likely because the governor's mansion was in disrepair. The state leased the official residence to a private family who used it as a boardinghouse. Later, in 1886, Governor John Peter Richardson III donated $2,700 to make significant modifications to the building.

=== 1900s ===
The building had demonstrated severe structural defects by the end of the 1940s, but only in 1955 did repairs begin, causing George Timmerman and his family to abandon the mansion for one year. The residence received significant landscaping improvements, a driveway, and a walled courtyard during the term of Donald S. Russell, as well as work to improve the building's structural integrity and a complete interior renovation, part of which was funded by the Russells' personal funds. Russell was actually forced to live in one half of the house due to incorrectly installed beams in the ceiling of the drawing room. A single-story guest wing and family dining area was added to the building during the term of Ernest F. Hollings. Governor Robert E. McNair formed a Governor's Mansion Committee, managed by his wife, Josephine McNair. The committee was able to obtain numerous items related to South Carolina's culture and history for the furnishing of the mansion. The commission purchased the adjacent Lace House for $67,000 in 1968, creating the Governor's Mansion Complex. In 1970, the South Carolina state legislature gave the commission the power to review improvements to the complex. In 1977, Ann Edwards, the governor's wife, initiated the Governor's Mansion Foundation, a not-for-profit organization to raise funds to pay for the mansion's historic furnishings. At the same time, the neighboring Caldwell-Boylston House was purchased, which, along with the Lace House, now provides office areas and a meeting and entertainment space. In 1986, all three buildings were connected by a landscaping project, making a 9 acres (36,000 m^{2}) complex.

In 1988, more structural defects were exposed from previous repairs, but plans to renovate yet again were not made quickly. During the term of Carroll A. Campbell, the only significant additions to the complex were that of a new guardhouse and second fountain. The renovation project began while David M. Beasley was governor, but was not completed until 2001, with a total cost of over $6 million, which exceeded the $3.7 million allocated by the state. Governor James H. Hodges became the first governor in 120 years not to live in the mansion in 1999.

=== 2000s ===
In 2003, Governor Mark Sanford announced that, as a result of a $150,000 budget deficit, the mansion would have to be closed for several months. Sanford said that the state could not afford to pay for the mansion's employees, utilities, and food. He also accused the previous governor, Jim Hodges, of overspending and ending the employment of prison inmates as butlers and maids (after allegations of sexual misconduct between inmates while working at the mansion in 2001), causing the state to have to pay for 11 employees. He also criticized the former governor for misappropriating $100,000 in other funding for the mansion two days before leaving office. However, Hodges said that the money assigned for the mansion had never been enough and that it was usual to use other funds to help maintain the residence. Sanford supporter John Rainey established a relief fund to help the building stay operational. A local company, Adluh Flour, donated grits and other wheat and corn products to the governor. In 2008, improvements to make the building more energy-efficient were completed.
