= Calwell =

Calwell is a surname. Notable people with the surname include:

- Arthur Calwell (1896–1973), Opposition Leader of Australia
- Bert Calwell (1898–1962), Australian rules footballer
- Clarrie Calwell (1896–1975), Australian rules footballer
- George Calwell (1891–1971), Australian rules footballer

== See also ==
- Places named for Arthur Calwell:
  - Division of Calwell, electoral division in the state of Victoria, Australia
  - Calwell, Australian Capital Territory, suburb of Canberra, Australia
- Caldwell (disambiguation)
