= Caldwell Creek =

Caldwell Creek may refer to:

- Caldwell Creek (Logan Creek), a stream in Missouri
- Caldwell Creek (St. Francis River), a stream in Missouri
- Caldwell Creek (Pennsylvania), a stream in Pennsylvania

== See also ==
- Caldwell
