= Cadwell =

Cadwell may refer to:

== People ==
=== Surname ===
- Albert Cadwell (1900–1944), English footballer
- Angela Cadwell, retired United States Air Force major general
- Arthur A. Cadwell (1882–1937), American cinematographer
- Charles Cadwell, American professor
- Darius Cadwell (1821–1905), American politician
- George Cadwell (1773–1826), American politician
- Jane Cadwell (1915–2000), American swimmer
- Linda Lee Cadwell (born 1945), widow of Bruce Lee
- Luman L. Cadwell (1836–1925), American soldier
- Sidney M. Cadwell (1893–1986), discoverer of anti-oxidants for rubber

=== Given name ===
- Cadwell Turnbull (born 1987), American fiction writer

== Places ==
- Cadwell Park, motor racing circuit in Lincolnshire, England
- Cadwell, Georgia
- Cadwell, Hertfordshire, England

== See also ==
- Caldwell (disambiguation)
- Kadwell, surname
