= University of Arkansas at Pine Bluff =

Public historically black university in Pine Bluff, Arkansas, US

- Former names: Branch Normal College (1875–1927); Arkansas Agricultural, Mechanical and Normal College (AM&N) (1927–1972)
- Type: Public historically black university
- Established: 1873
- Parent institution: University of Arkansas System
- Academic affiliations: Space-grant
- Endowment: $7 million
- Chancellor: Anthony Graham
- Students: 2,100 (2023)
- Location: Pine Bluff, Arkansas, U.S. 34°14′32″N 92°01′13″W
- Campus: Urban
- Colors: Black and gold
- Sporting affiliations: NCAA Division I – (FCS), Southwestern Athletic Conference
- Mascot: Golden Lions
- Website: www.uapb.edu

The University of Arkansas at Pine Bluff (UAPB) is a public historically black university in Pine Bluff, Arkansas. Founded in 1873, it is the second oldest public college or university in Arkansas. It was one of about 180 "normal schools" established by state governments in the 19th century to train teachers for the rapidly growing public common schools. UAPB is part of the University of Arkansas System and Thurgood Marshall College Fund.

== History ==
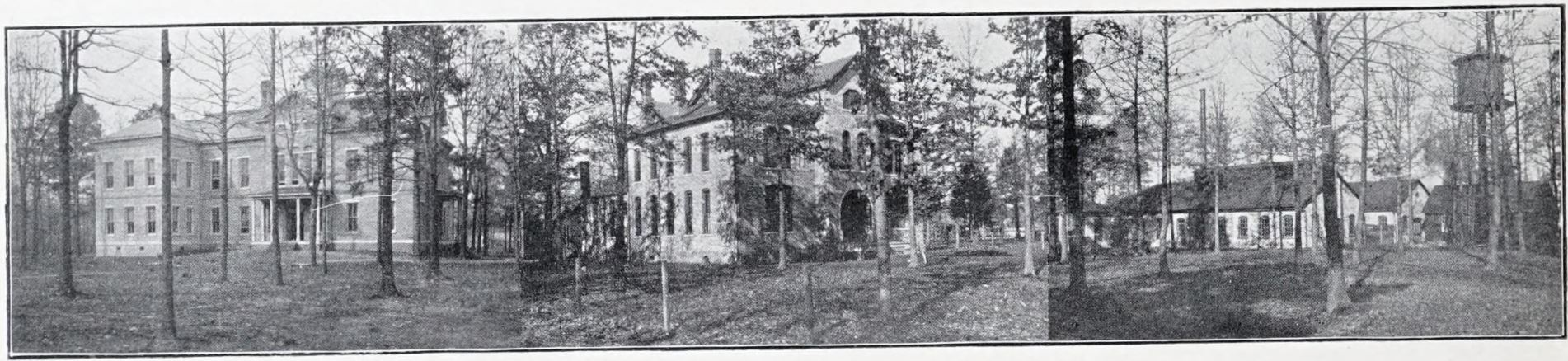
Branch Normal College, c. 1910

The University of Arkansas at Pine Bluff was authorized in 1873 by the Reconstruction-era legislature as the Branch Normal College and opened in 1875 with Joseph Carter Corbin principal. A historically black college, it was nominally part of the "normal" (education) department of Arkansas Industrial University, later the University of Arkansas. It was operated separately as part of a compromise to get a college for black students, as the state maintained racial segregation well into the 20th century. (Although the University of Arkansas at Fayetteville was integrated when it opened in 1872, it soon became segregated after the end of Reconstruction and didn't start desegregation until 1948.) It later was designated as a land-grant college under the 1890 federal amendments to Morrill Land-Grant Acts. As Congress had originally established the land grant colleges to provide education to all qualified students in a state, in 1890 it required states maintaining segregated systems to establish a separate land-grant university for blacks as well as whites.

In 1927, the school severed its ties with the University of Arkansas and became Arkansas Agricultural, Mechanical & Normal College (Arkansas AM&N). It moved to its current campus location in 1929.

In the mid-1950s AM&N administrators asked students not to support civil rights causes perceived as radical by Arkansas politicians as they feared getting their funding cut by the state. John B. Pickhart, an alumnus of the University of Arkansas, Fayetteville, wrote that therefore AM&N being in Pine Bluff "might actually have slowed development of an integration movement" for that community.

On June 2, 1958, Martin Luther King Jr. delivered the commencement address at Arkansas Agriculture, Mechanical & Normal College (now the University of Arkansas at Pine Bluff) before 233 graduates and drew in over 1,000 guests.

College president Lawrence A. Davis Sr. invited Dr. King, in recognition of his work with the Montgomery Bus Boycott, despite receiving death threats amid the charged climate during the Civil Rights Movement. Davis chose Dr. King to address the graduating class for his distinctive leadership and described him as "a new type of mass leader, one of the most interesting, unique, and effective people on the scene today."

Dr. King urged the graduates to challenge racial segregation through nonviolent means and foster unity. He declared, "Through the use of nonviolence, understanding, and goodwill, we will achieve desegregation and integration. After we are brought together physically, we will come together spiritually because men will see that it is right and natural. We believe that we are on God's side and that God is with us."

Following the visit, a legislator of Faulkner County accused King of "double crossing" the state legislature, to which Davis responded, "well sir, he made an excellent speech." The legislature consequentially imposed averse budget cuts for AM&N. For the 1959-61 budget, the school sought roughly $1.1 million for each year, but received a grant of $800,000. An additional $50,000 was also granted with the support of Sens. Morrell Gatheright and Sam Levine.

Gatherwright described the cuts as a "spite measure" and told the Senate the budget cuts happened promptly after Dr. King spoke a year prior. Nevertheless, Davis put the students' well-being as a priority and stretched the budget to its extent, "students should be able to do all the things that those in white colleges do," Davis stated.

In the summer of 1962, Robert (Rob) Whitfield, Jim Jones, and William (Bill) Hansen came as field representatives for the Student Nonviolent Coordinating Committee to Pine Bluff. Jones and Hansen attended AM&N college together while Hansen became the spokesperson for the Pine Bluff Student Movement. SNCC hoped to start a movement that would stimulate the local community that would also motivate nearby rural areas. “Their earliest and most eager recruits were students at the historically black Arkansas Agricultural, Mechanical & Normal College (AM&N).” The movement included AM&N students, high school students, Black-owned businesses, professional people, and working people.

The first sit-ins occurred on February 1, 1963, the third anniversary of the Greensboro sit-ins, at Woolworth’s and Walgreens lunch counters. Despite threats of suspension and expulsion from AM&N administration, students continued to participate. Protests expanded into boycotts, picketing, and demonstrations at theaters and other public facilities, resulting in the desegregation of lunch counters and several theaters. The PBSM also led voter registration efforts, increasing the number of registered African American voters in Jefferson County to 1,876 by October 1963.

The movement used nonviolent protest strategies but faced arrests, loss of housing, and violence from white mobs and police, including beatings, chemical attacks, and the use of police dogs. Support from Black-owned businesses and the establishment of the Freedom House, housing for punished students, aided suspended and jailed students.

By early 1964, some businesses agreed to hire black workers, while others were boycotted. The movement declined following the passage of the Civil Rights Act of 1964, and SNCC activity in Pine Bluff had ceased by 1967.

In 1972, Arkansas AM&N re-joined what is now the University of Arkansas System. As a full-fledged campus with graduate study departments, it gained its current name and university status in the process.

Since 1988, the university has gained recognition as a leading research institution in aquaculture studies, offering the state's only comprehensive program in this field. It supports a growing regional industry throughout the Mid-South (according to the school, aquaculture is a $167 million industry in Arkansas alone and worth approximately $1.2 billion in the Mississippi Delta region). In 2012, the program was enhanced by the addition of an Aquaculture/Fisheries PhD program.

The University of Arkansas at Pine Bluff is the oldest and largest HBCU in Arkansas.

== Academics ==
Undergraduate demographics as of fall 2023
Race and ethnicity	Total
Black	90%
Hispanic	3%
White	3%
International student	2%
Two or more races	2%
Economic diversity
Low-income (Note: The percentage of students who received an income-based federal Pell grant intended for low-income students.)	67%
Affluent (Note: The percentage of students who are a part of the American middle class at the bare minimum.)	33%

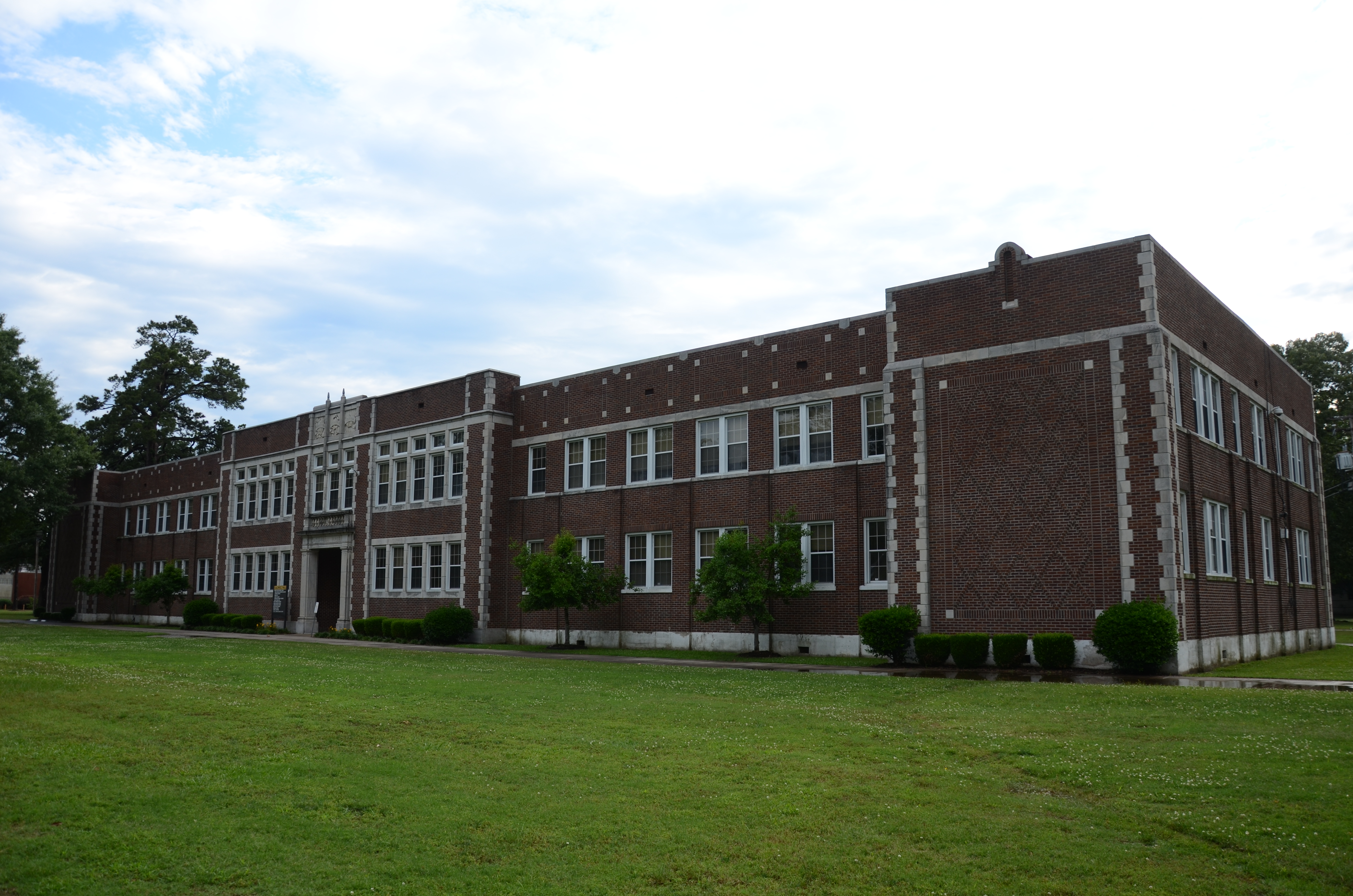
Caldwell Hall

UAPB is divided into eight academic divisions.

- The School of Agriculture, Fisheries, and Human Sciences
- The School of Arts and Sciences
- The School of Business and Management
- The School of Education
- Graduate Studies & Continuing Education
- Carolyn F. Blakely Honors Program
- Military Science
- University College

UAPB is fully accredited by the Higher Learning Commission.

UAPB has the only comprehensive aquaculture program in Arkansas, established to help support the state's $167 million aquaculture industry.

Since UAPB offers only one engineering degree program (agricultural engineering), it has a partnership with the University of Arkansas at Fayetteville (UA) that allow qualified students to spend three years to complete an engineering related bachelor's degree at UAPB then automatic admissions into UA to complete their engineering bachelor's degree in two years. Students who successfully complete the UAPB-UA engineering program will have two bachelor's degrees in approximately five years.

In 2019, UAPB established a partnership a with UALR William H. Bowen School of Law. UAPB students with at least a 3.4 cumulative GPA, minimum 154 LSAT score, and a clean disciplinary record will automatically be admitted. In addition to being admitted, they will receive a 25 percent tuition scholarship.

== Campus ==
Much of the campus is in the Pine Bluff city limits though some portions are in unincorporated areas.

== University Museum and Cultural Center ==
The University Museum and Cultural Center on the campus of UAPB contains photographs, catalogs, yearbooks, letters, artifacts, portraits and other ephemera that document the lives and culture of African-Americans who helped shaped the history of UAPB and the Arkansas Delta. It is the only museum of its kind in Arkansas and was established in 2005.

== Athletics ==
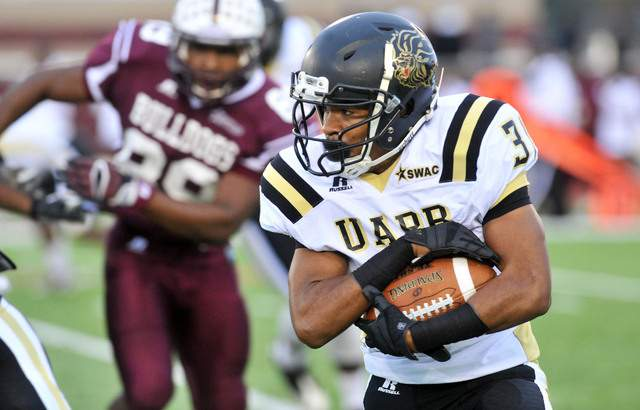
A UAPB Golden Lions football player carrying the football in 2014

UAPB's colors are black and gold and their nickname is the Golden Lions. Arkansas–Pine Bluff's sports teams have participated in NCAA Division I in the Southwestern Athletic Conference (SWAC) since re-joining the conference in 1998, and competes in the Football Championship Subdivision (formerly I-AA) for football. Home football games are held at Golden Lion Stadium. Men's sports also include baseball, basketball, cross country, golf, tennis and track & field; women's sports include basketball, cross country, soccer, softball, tennis, track & field and volleyball.

== Student life ==
=== Residential life ===
The University of Arkansas at Pine Bluff houses over 1,000 students on campus. Hunt Hall (named in memory of Silas Hunt, the first black law student at the University of Arkansas at Fayetteville) houses male students. The Harrold Complex, consisting of four halls, Johnson, Copeland, Fischer, and Stevens, is for females. Freshman males are assigned to Johnson and Copeland.

=== Marching band ===
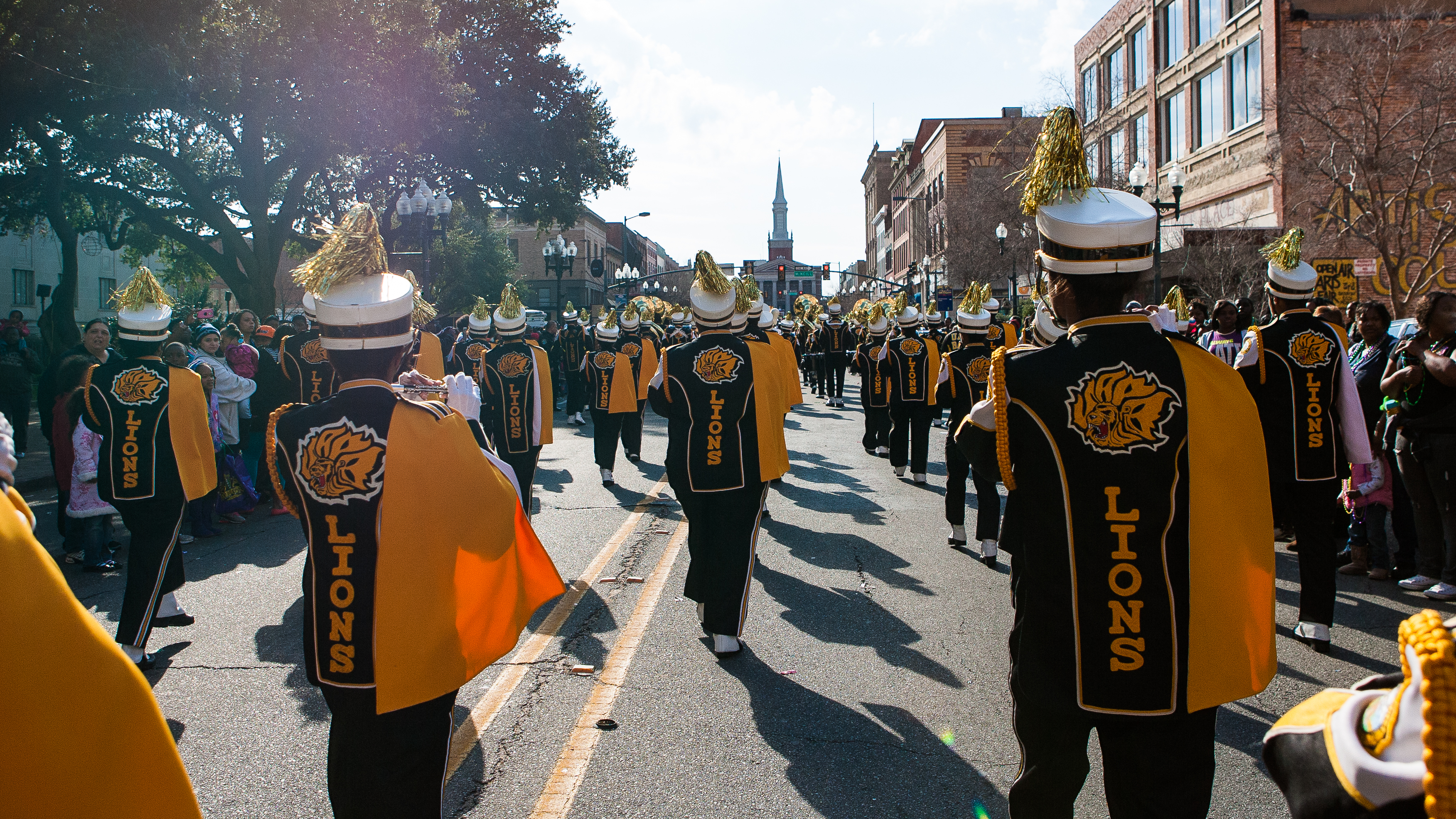
M4 marching in a Shreveport, Louisiana parade in 2013

In 2008, UAPB's band known as the Marching Musical Machine of the Mid-South (M4), made their debut appearance at the Honda Battle of the Bands. In 2009, M4 was selected to participate in the United States Presidential Inaugural Parade.

M4 is one of the top three largest collegiate marching bands in Arkansas and is accompanied by two auxiliaries. The dance auxiliary is known as the "M4 Golden Girls" and the flag auxiliary is known as the "24K Golden Silks." M4 is a five drum major led marching band.

=== Fraternities and sororities ===
Eight of the nine National Pan-Hellenic Council (NPHC) fraternities and sororities are represented on campus. Less than five percent of the undergraduate student body are represented in the NPHC. The university also hosts four of the seven fraternity and sorority organizations part of the National Interfraternity Music Council (NIMC).

== Notable alumni ==
Name	Class year	Notability	Reference(s)
Chris Akins	1999	former NFL defensive back	
Charles Ali	2007	former professional football player	
Tevester Anderson	1962	retired head basketball coach for Jackson State University and Murray State University	
Terron Armstead		professional football player currently with the New Orleans Saints	
Big Tuck		rapper	
Greg Briggs		NFL player	
Ivory Lee Brown	1991	football player	
Frank Burgess	1957	professional basketball player; later an attorney and U.S. federal judge for the Western District of Washington; only attended one year before enlisting in the U.S. Air Force; after serving a four-year tour, he transferred to Gonzaga University, where he eventually earned bachelor's and law degrees	
Cassius Cash		superintendent of Great Smoky Mountains National Park	
Danny K. Davis	1961	U.S. representative for 7th Congressional District in Illinois	
Joe Gardner	1966	jazz musician, trumpet	
Jamie Gillan	2019	professional football player currently with the New York Giants	
L. C. Greenwood	1969	football player; former Pittsburgh Steelers defensive lineman, a member of the famous Steel Curtain defense	
Samuel L. Kountz	1952	performed the first successful Kidney transplant between humans who were not identical twins	
James Leary	1968	jazz/classical musician, bass, Sammy Davis, Jr., Count Basie Orchestra, Oakland Symphony	
Martha S. Lewis	1944	government official in New York city and state	
Martell Mallett		Canadian football player currently with the Calgary Stampeders	
Chris Mercer	1946	first African-American deputy state prosecutor in the south	
Cleo Miller	1973	former professional football player; running back for Kansas City Chiefs and Cleveland Browns	
Jamil Nasser	1955	jazz musician, bassist	
Smokie Norful	1995	pastor, Grammy Award-winning gospel singer and pianist	
Pamela A. Smith	1992	police chief	
John Stubblefield	1967	jazz musician, sax, recording artist	
Courtney Van Buren	2003	former professional football player	
Dante Wesley	2002	former professional football player	
Greg Wesley	2000	former professional football player	
Monk Williams		professional football player	
Don Zimmerman		former professional football player	
