= Governor of South Carolina =

Head of government of the U.S. state of South Carolina

- Seal of the governor

- State flag

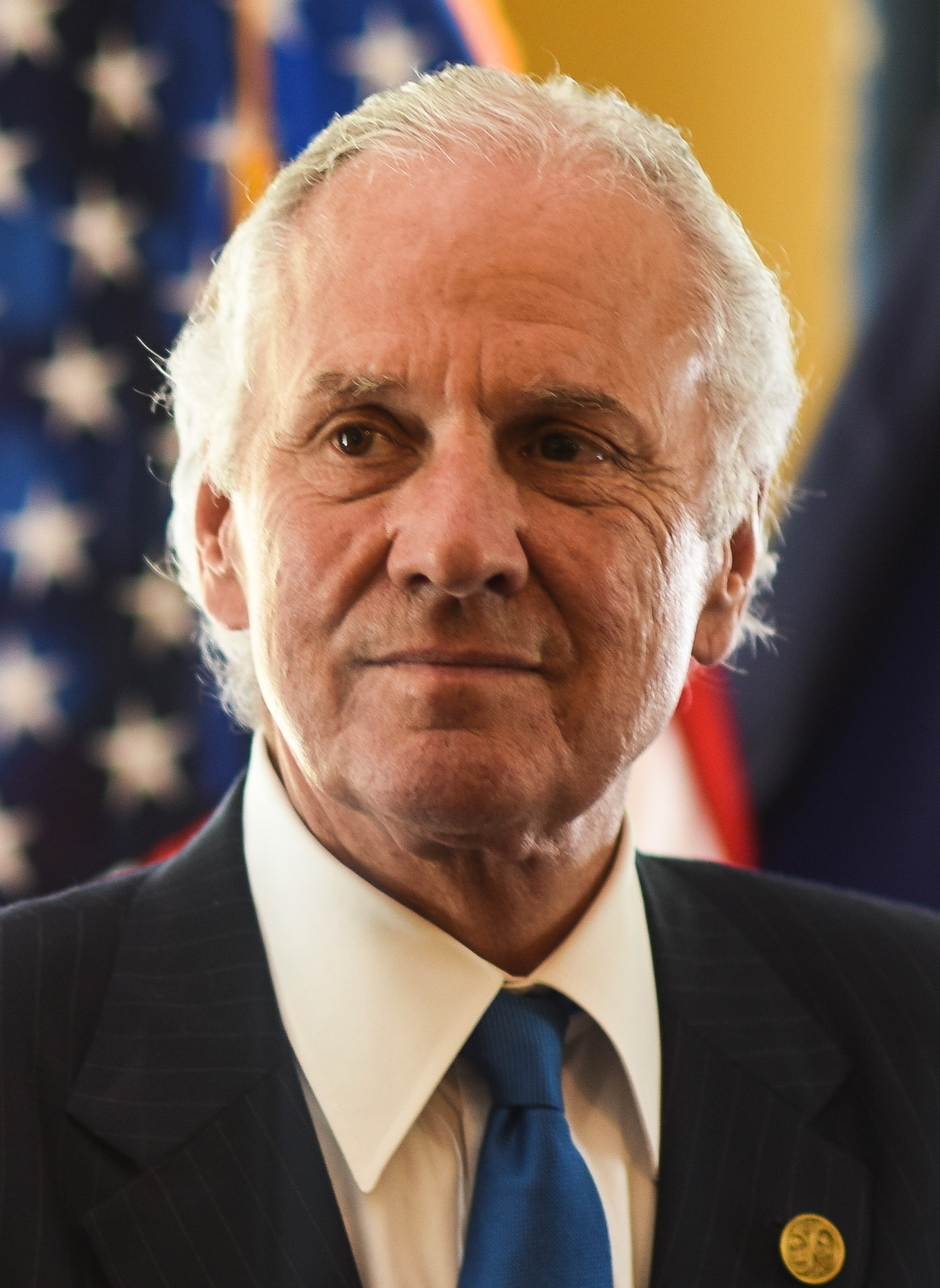
- Incumbent; Henry McMaster since January 24, 2017
- Government of South Carolina
- Style: Governor (informal); The Honorable (formal); His Excellency (formal)
- Residence: Governors Mansion
- Seat: Columbia
- Appointer: Elected at-large
- Term length: Four years, renewable once consecutively
- Constituting instrument: Constitution of South Carolina
- Inaugural holder: William Sayle
- Formation: March 15, 1670 (356 years ago)
- Succession: Line of succession
- Deputy: Lieutenant Governor of South Carolina
- Salary: $106,078 (2022)
- Website: Official website

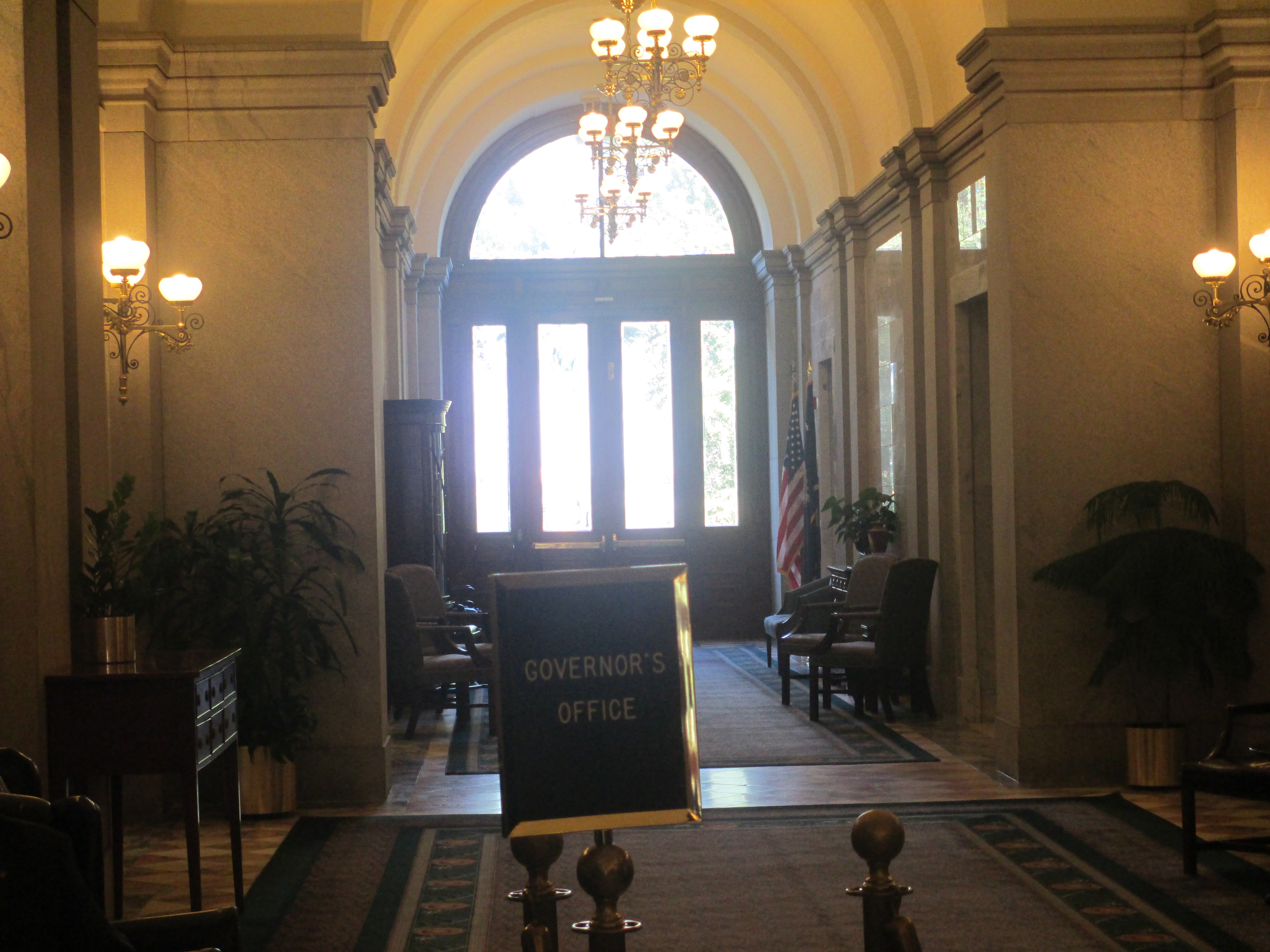
Outer part of the governor's office in the South Carolina State House in Columbia

The governor of South Carolina is the head of government of South Carolina. The governor is the ex officio commander-in-chief of the National Guard when not called into federal service. The governor's responsibilities include making yearly "State of the State" addresses to the South Carolina General Assembly, submitting an executive budget, and ensuring that state laws are enforced.

There have been 87 people elected Governor since 1776, including 86 men and one woman. However, there have been 30 previous colonial governors before 1776 and are officially counted as Governors by the South Carolina Information Highway.

The 117th and current governor of South Carolina is Henry McMaster, who is serving his second elected term. He assumed the office on January 24, 2017, after Nikki Haley resigned to become the United States ambassador to the United Nations. McMaster is also the state’s longest serving governor.

== Requirements to hold office ==
There are three legal requirements set forth in Section 2 of Article IV of the South Carolina Constitution. A candidate for the office of governor must be: (1) at least 30 years of age and (2) a citizen of the United States and a resident of South Carolina for 5 years preceding the day of election. The final requirement, (3) "No person shall be eligible to the office of governor who denies the existence of the Supreme Being", is of extremely doubtful validity in light of the 1961 Supreme Court decision Torcaso v. Watkins, which reaffirmed that religious tests for public offices violated the Fourteenth Amendment to the United States Constitution. This requirement, however, has still not been removed from the Constitution of South Carolina.

== Terms of office ==
Under Section 4 in Article IV of the South Carolina Constitution, the governor serves a four-year term in office beginning at noon on the first Wednesday following the second Tuesday in January following his election. Section 3 of Article IV states that no person shall be elected governor for more than two successive terms. However, there is no limit on the total number of terms as it is not a lifetime limit. The most recent governor to serve non-consecutive terms was Olin D. Johnston, who left office in 1945.

== Powers, duties, and responsibilities ==
According to the South Carolina Constitution, the governor:

- Exercises "supreme executive authority."
- Appoints directors to 14 cabinet agencies, but most appointments are shared with the General Assembly.
- Serves as the commander-in-chief of the South Carolina National Guard.
- Serves as the commander-in-chief of the South Carolina State Guard, which is an auxiliary of the National Guard organized for in-state homeland defense.
- Commutes death sentences to life imprisonment. (Note: Unlike most states, the power to grant reprieves and pardons resides in a seven-member board, not the governor.)
- Calls the General Assembly to an extra session in "extraordinary circumstances."
- Adjourns the General Assembly.
- Exercises veto and a Line-item veto power on bills.
- Declares a state of emergency and oversees relief in the event of a disaster.
  - Declares public schools and government offices closed during civil or weather emergencies.
- Oversees all state departments.
- Serves as the ex officio chair of the board of trustees of all state universities.
- Submits a budget proposal to the General Assembly every January.
- Delivers a state of the state address, "from time to time," to the General Assembly; this is usually done in January.
- Appoints United States senators in cases of vacancy to serve until the next election.
- Appoints (or suspends) county sheriffs in cases of vacancy to serve until the next election.
- Removes elected school board officials for "malfeasance, misfeasance, chronic unexcused absenteeism, conflicts of interest, misconduct in office, or persistent neglect of duty in office, or are deemed medically incompetent or medically incapacitated."

The governor is a member of the State Fiscal Accountability Authority, a state board which also includes the comptroller general, the treasurer, and the chairs of the budget committees in the General Assembly. The board oversees state spending and management of state property.

== Succession ==
According to Article IV, Sections 6 and 7 of the South Carolina Constitution, and according to South Carolina law sections 1-3-120, 1-3-130 and 1-9-30, if the incumbent governor is no longer able or permitted to fulfill the duties of the office of governor, the following line of succession will be followed:

#	Position	Current officeholder
1	Lieutenant Governor	Pamela Evette (R)
2	President of the South Carolina Senate	Thomas C. Alexander (R)
3	Speaker of the South Carolina House of Representatives	Murrell Smith (R)
Eligible to serve as emergency interim governor if 1–3 are vacant (Note: The Secretary of State, Treasurer, and Attorney General can only exercise the powers of governor, but cannot become the governor.)
4	Secretary of State	Mark Hammond (R)
5	Treasurer	Curtis Loftis (R)
6	Attorney General	Alan Wilson (R)

If the governor is impeached and removed from office or if the governor is temporarily disabled or absent from office, the lieutenant governor will have the powers of the governor. If the governor-elect is unable to fulfill the duties of the office of the governor, the lieutenant governor will become governor when the incumbent governor's term expires. If there is an incumbent governor beginning a new term, but a lieutenant governor-elect, and if the incumbent governor is unable to fulfill the duties of the office of the governor, the incumbent lieutenant governor shall become governor until the inauguration date, and the lieutenant governor-elect shall become governor on that date.

The governor may temporarily transmit his powers and duties down the line of succession in cases of temporary disability. The most recent case of such transmission of power was in 2014 when Lieutenant Governor Yancey McGill, a Democrat, acted as governor while Republican Nikki Haley had surgery.

No governor has ever been impeached, but since the beginning of American Revolution in 1776, ten governors have resigned and four have died in office. Andrew Gordon Magrath, a Confederate Democrat, was forcibly removed from office by the Union Army in 1865 at the end of the Civil War. In 2009, the General Assembly considered impeachment articles against Governor Mark Sanford, but ultimately they did not pass.

== Oath of office ==
"I do solemnly swear (or affirm) that I am duly qualified, according to the Constitution of this State, to exercise the duties of the office to which I have been elected, (or appointed), and that I will, to the best of my ability, discharge the duties thereof, and preserve, protect, and defend the Constitution of this State and of the United States. So help me God."

== History ==
=== Proprietary period ===
Governors during the proprietary period (1670–1719) were appointed by Proprieters, and served no fixed term. Governors 1–19 served during this period.

=== Royal period ===
Governors of the royal period were appointed by the monarch in name but were selected by the British government under the control of the Board of Trade. Governors served as viceroy to the British monarch. The governor could appoint provincial officials or suspend their offices on his own authority, except those offices named above that were also appointed by the crown. Legislative bills required royal assent from the governor and could be rejected; he could prorogue or dissolve the Commons House of Assembly on his own authority. Governors served no fixed term, serving officially at His Majesty's pleasure. Governors 20–30 served during this period.

=== Articles of Confederation ===
From 1776 to 1779, the office of governor was titled President of South Carolina and he was chosen by the General Assembly. Governors served no fixed term. John Rutledge and Rawlins Lowndes were the only two to hold the title of "President." From 1779 to 1792, governors retained the title of "Governor." Governors 31–37 served during this period.

=== Constitution of 1790 ===
Governors during this period were chosen by the General Assembly and served a two-year term. Governors were ineligible to serve more than one term consecutively. This system ended after the Civil War when the Union army overthrew and imprisoned Governor Andrew Gordon Magrath; President Andrew Johnson appointed his successor. Governors 37–72 served during this period.

=== Post Civil-War ===
James Lawrence Orr was the first governor to be popularly elected. Following the state's failure to adopt the 14th Amendment to the United States Constitution, the US Congress eliminated all offices of state government. A temporary military government headed by Edward Canby was set up until new elections were held after the writing of the Constitution of 1868. All male citizens above the age of 21, regardless of race, were given the right to vote and the governor was allowed to be elected to two consecutive terms.

The election of Ben Tillman in 1890 to governor by the support of agrarian reformers forced a new constitutional convention to be held. The constitution of 1895 instituted a poll tax and also required voters to pass a literacy test. These provisions were used to effectively deny the vote to blacks. The convention also increased the governor's powers by granting a line-item veto on the budget. Initially, the United States Supreme Court upheld the validity of legislation requiring voters to pay a poll tax, and ruled that literacy tests were not necessarily unconstitutional. In 1964, the Twenty-Fourth Amendment to the United States Constitution made it unlawful for a state to require payment of a poll tax in order to vote in a federal election, and the Supreme Court, reversing the Breedlove decision, then held that requiring the payment of a poll tax in any election was a violation of the Equal Protection Clause of the Fourteenth Amendment to the United States Constitution. Elimination of the literacy test required federal legislation, the validity of which was upheld by the Supreme Court.

Beginning in 1926 and ending in 1978, governors were elected to one four-year term, which could not be renewed for reelection consecutively. Since 1980, governors have been elected to a four-year term, which can be renewed for reelection once consecutively. Governors 72–117 have served during this period.

== Official residence ==
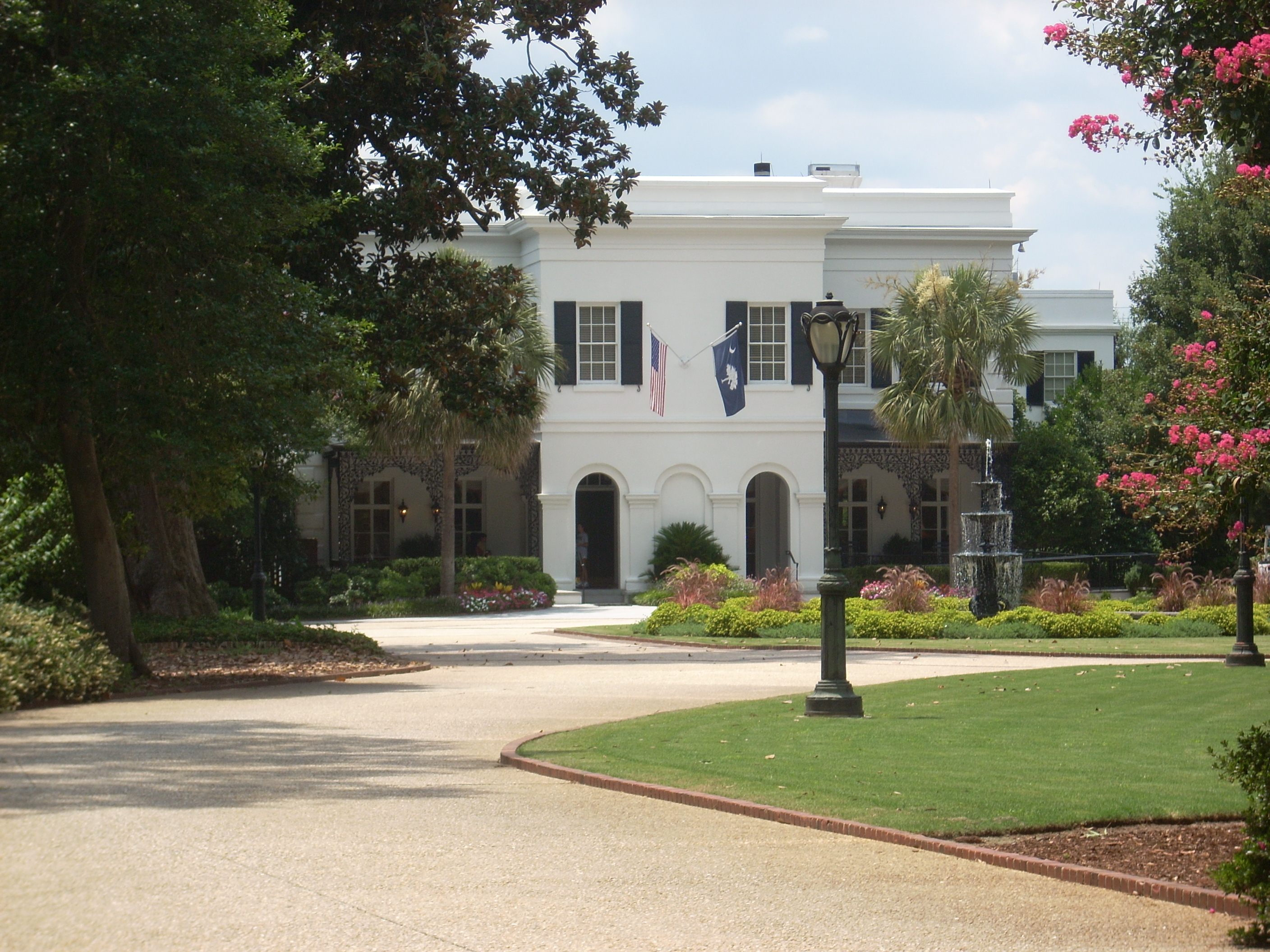
The Governor's Mansion in Columbia

The Governor's Mansion, located at 800 Richland Street in Columbia, on Arsenal Hill, is the official residence of the governor of South Carolina. It was built in 1855 and originally served as faculty quarters for The Arsenal Academy which together with the Citadel Academy in Charleston formed The South Carolina Military Academy (now The Citadel); The Arsenal was burned by Sherman's forces in February 1865 and never reopened; the faculty quarters building was the only structure to survive and became the official residence of the governor in 1868. The South Carolina Constitution in Section 20 of Article IV requires that the governor is to reside where the General Assembly convenes.

== Timeline ==
Timeline of South Carolina governors

== See also ==
- List of governors of South Carolina
- South Carolina gubernatorial elections
- Lieutenant Governor of South Carolina
