= 8-inch/23-caliber gun =

8"/23 caliber Mark 7 Naval Guns
- Type: Naval gun
- Place of origin: United States

Service history
- Used by: United States Navy

Production history
- Designer: Bureau of Ordnance
- Designed: 1917
- Manufacturer: US Naval Gun Factory (NGF)
- Produced: 1918-1921
- No. built: Nos. 256–285 NGF; Nos. 286–301 Midvale; Nos. 302–334 NGF
- Variants: Mark 7 Mod 0

Specifications
- Mass: 5,560 lb (2,520 kg) (without breech block); 5,560 lb (2,520 kg) (with breech block)
- Length: 190 in (4,800 mm)
- Barrel length: 182.9 in (4,650 mm) bore (22.9 (23) calibers)
- Shell: 285 lb (129 kg)
- Caliber: 8 in (203 mm)
- Elevation: −5° to +20°
- Traverse: −150° to +150°
- Rate of fire: 3–4 round per minute
- Muzzle velocity: 700 ft/s (210 m/s)
- Effective firing range: 2,600 yd (2,400 m) at 20.8° elevation

The 8"/23 caliber gun (spoken "eight-inch-twenty-three-caliber") were planned as an anti-submarine warfare howitzer that could be mounted on destroyers. It was further planned that they would be mounted on gunboats, cruisers, and battleships.

== Design ==
After the successful testing of the British 7.5-inch howitzer for anti-submarine warfare (ASW), US Force Commander, Vice Admiral William Sims, recommended that the US Navy develop a similar weapon, with a range of 2,800 yd (2,600 m) and a bursting charge of 71 lb (32 kg). Two of the British guns were placed on Caldwell, after which Sims recommended placing two of the new Mark 8s on all US destroyers. It was expected that the new gun would replace the standard 4 in (100 mm)/50 caliber Mk 9 guns on the same Mk 11 Mod 1 or 2 mounts.

The gun was designed to fire a flat-nose Mk 12 Mod 4 shell, that was 43.25 in (1,099 mm) long and weighed 285 lb (129 kg), including the 75 lb (34 kg) bursting charge, 2,600 yd (2,400 m). It also could have been modified, by adding an arbor or similar insert into its barrel, for firing a depth charge.

== Construction ==
The gun consisted of a tube of single alloy-steel forging. They weighed 5,560 lb (2,520 kg), with the breech, with a barrel length of 190 in (4,800 mm) and a bore of 23 calibers.

== Service history ==
Gun No. 256, was fire tested in February 1918. Eighty-nine guns were ordered, from both the US Naval Gun Factory (NGF) and Midvale Steel. Some of the gun cards though, have blank completion dates, with No. 326, being the highest gun tested, with a firing date of 20 December 1921. In the end, none were ever mounted and none survived until WWII.

== Bibliography ==
- Friedman, Norman (2011). Naval Weapons of World War One. Seaforth Publishing. ISBN 978-1-84832-100-7.

Online sources

- DiGiullian, Tony (29 July 2016). "United States of America 8"/30 (20.3 cm) Marks 1 and 2". Navweaps.
