= Columbia Historic District I =

Historic district in South Carolina, United States

- U.S. National Register of Historic Places
- U.S. Historic district
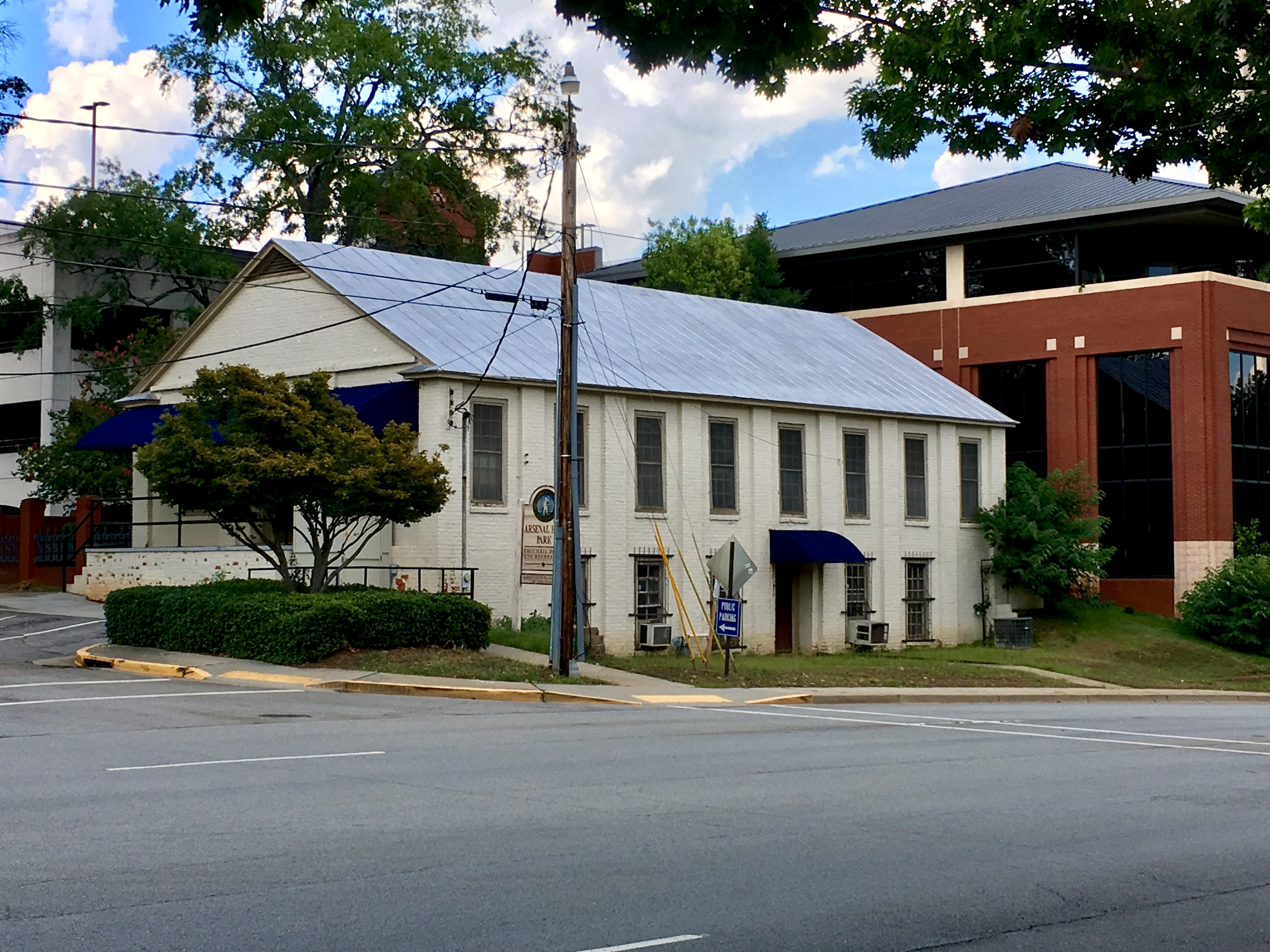
- Palmetto Ironworks and Armory

- Location within South Carolina Location within the United States
- Location: Roughly bounded by Elmwood, Assembly, Laurel, and Wayne Sts., Columbia, South Carolina
- Coordinates: 34°00′37″N 81°02′13″W
- Area: 25 acres (10 ha)
- Built: 1825
- Architectural style: Early Republic, Greek Revival, Columbia Cottage
- NRHP reference No.: 71000798
- Added to NRHP: May 6, 1971

Columbia Historic District I is a national historic district located in the Arsenal Hill neighborhood at Columbia, South Carolina. The district encompasses nine contributing buildings and includes a complex of fine mansions and attractive homes built before the American Civil War. The buildings are in the Greek Revival, Italianate, Classical Revival, and the “Columbia Cottage” styles. They include the Governor's Mansion, Caldwell-Hampton-Boylston House, Lace House, and Palmetto Iron Works and Armory.

It was added to the National Register of Historic Places in 1971.
