= Action of 7 July 1804 =

Naval action between USA and Tripoli

- Part of First Barbary War
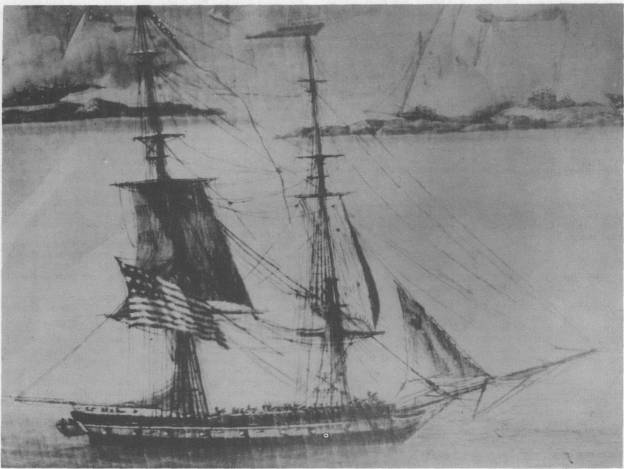
- USS Vixen which played a role in the attack on a Tripolitan galiot.
Date	7 July 1804
Location	Near Tripoli (present day Libya)
Result	Tripolitanian victory

Belligerents
United States	Tripolitania

Commanders and leaders
James R. Caldwell; John Sword Dorsey	Unknown

Strength
3 Brig; 1 Schooner; 2 boats	1,000 men 1 galiot

Casualties and losses
2 killed 2 wounded	Unknown

The Action of 7 July 1804 was a military engagement between the US Navy and the Tripolitans near Tripoli. A Tripolitan ship carrying wheat that attempted to enter Tripoli was forced to run ashore by US ships. A US attempt to capture or destroy the vessel was repelled, and the cargo was saved by the Tripolitans.

== Background ==
Following failed attempts in the spring of 1804 to secure a peace treaty with Yusuf Karamanli, the US commodore, Edward Preble, commanded the third squadron and sailed to Tripoli to force Karamanli to a peace treaty through military means. The US squadron sailed to Naples under the Kingdom of Sicily and granted their pledge for support, providing him with two bomb ketches and six gunboats with 12 crew under each ship. The US squadron arrived off Tripoli on June 12. Preble attempted to negotiate with Karamanli for the ransoming of US prisoners but failed. The Americans resorted to military means, blockading the city.

== Action ==
On July 7, the American ships USS Syren, USS Argus, USS Vixen, and USS Scourage were blockading Tripoli until they noticed a large Tripolitan galiot sailing towards the city. The galiot was carrying a cargo of wheat. The US ships began sailing towards it and successfully forced it ashore nine miles west of Tripoli. Around 6:00 AM, the wind died and the chase stopped. The American ships attempted to bombard the Tripolitan vessel, but with no effect. The Americans then began dispatching boats to capture or destroy the ship. The Tripolitans began unloading the cargo.

The Americans dispatched the USS Syren's launch boat with a 12 lb. carronade and a barge with a heavy Swivel gun led by Lieutenant James R. Caldwell and Midshipman John Sword Dorsey. The two boats advanced until they were grounded in a rocky area of the reefs, making them immovable. The Americans were exposed to heavy fire by the Tripolitans, who took the rocks and sandhills as defensive positions, numbering 1,000. USS Vixen was sent to cover the boats. The Americans managed to damage the ship but failed to destroy it or capture it. Seeing that nothing could be done in this dangerous situation, the Americans retreated. The Tripolitans were able to save their cargo.

The Americans suffered 1 killed and 3 wounded in the attack, one of whom received a mortal wound and died. All of the casualties were Marines.

== Sources ==
- Spencer C. Tucker (2013), The Encyclopedia of the Wars of the Early American Republic, 1783–1812, A Political, Social, and Military History [3 Volumes].
- John C. Fredriksen (2010), The United States Navy, A Chronology, 1775 to the Present.
- US Government Printing Office (1940), Naval Documents related to the United States Wars with the Barbary Powers, Vol IV.
- Gardner Weld Allen, (1905), Our navy and the Barbary corsairs.
