= Kadwell =

Kadwell is a surname. Notable people with the surname include:

- Harry Kadwell (1902–1999), Australian rugby league footballer
- Jack Kadwell (1918−2007), Australian rugby league footballer

== See also ==
- Cadwell (disambiguation)
- Kadell
