= Joe Gardner (musician) =

American jazz musician

Joe Gardner was an American Jazz trumpeter and arranger.

Gardner graduated from the University of Arkansas at Pine Bluff in 1966. He was primarily known for his association with the Charles Mingus Quintet, which was associated with Detroit. The group became popular in Europe in the early 1970s.
