= Arsenal Academy =

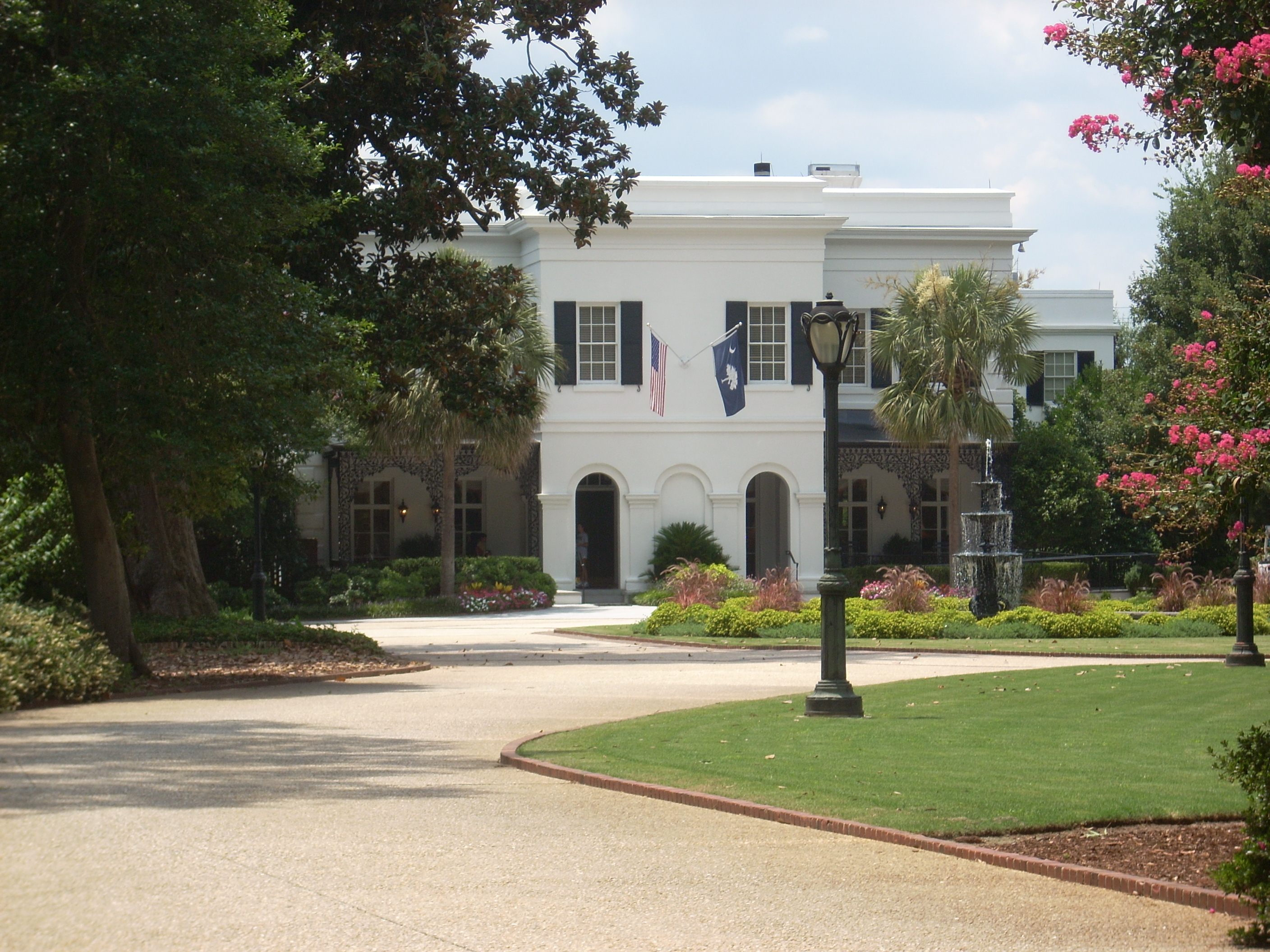
- Officers' Quarters (Currently South Carolina Governor's Mansion)
- Columbia, South Carolina

Information
- Other name: South Carolina Military Academy
- School type: Military academy
- Established: 1842
- Closed: 1865
- Feeder to: The Citadel Academy (from 1845)

The Arsenal Academy was a military academy in Columbia, South Carolina, originally established in 1842 as an independent school by the state of South Carolina. In 1845, the academy became a component of the South Carolina Military Academy (now The Citadel), in which first year cadets underwent their initial year of training before completing their studies at the larger Citadel Academy in Charleston, South Carolina. The school was burned by Sherman's forces in 1865 and never reopened.

== History ==
At the outset of the Civil War in 1861, the South Carolina Military Academy consisted of two institutions, both built in the 1820s as state arsenals, specifically to have the state prepared in the event of a slave revolt like that planned by Denmark Vesey (who was from Charleston). This process consolidated a number of smaller arsenals around the state to two locations, which would in 1855 be converted to military academies. The Arsenal Academy, or Arsenal Military Academy, or The Arsenal, was in Columbia, and the Citadel Academy, or Citadel Military Academy, or The Citadel (due to the appearance of its building) in Charleston. The Arsenal in Columbia was burned by Union General William Sherman's troops in 1865; in fact, destroying it was one of his objectives. It was never rebuilt. The only surviving building from The Arsenal is the current Governor's Mansion.

The Citadel suffered no damage and, after serving as housing for Federal forces during the Reconstruction Era, reopened as the South Carolina Military Academy or commonly The Citadel Academy in the 1880s.
