= Cauldwell =

Cauldwell may refer to:

Places

- Cauldwell, Bedford, England
- Cauldwell, Derbyshire, England

People

- Brendan Cauldwell (1922–2006), Irish radio, film and television actor
- David O. Cauldwell (1897–1959), American sexologist
- William Cauldwell (1824-1907), American publisher

== See also ==
- Caldwell (disambiguation)
