= Caldwell Hall =

Caldwell Hall may refer to:

In the United States

- Caldwell Hall (Catholic University of America), a residence hall
- Caldwell Hall (Pine Bluff, Arkansas), listed on the NRHP in Arkansas
- Caldwell Hall (Georgia Tech), a residence hall at the Georgia Institute of Technology
- Caldwell Hall (Ithaca, New York), listed on the NRHP in New York
- Caldwell Hall (Abilene, Texas), listed on the NRHP in Texas
