= Kadell =

Kadell is a given name. Notable people with the name include:

- Kadell Daniel (born 1994), English-Guyanese footballer
- Kadell Thomas (born 1996), Canadian soccer player

== See also ==
- Kadwell
