= Lace House (Columbia, South Carolina) =

Historic house in South Carolina, United States

- U.S. National Register of Historic Places
- U.S. Historic district – Contributing property
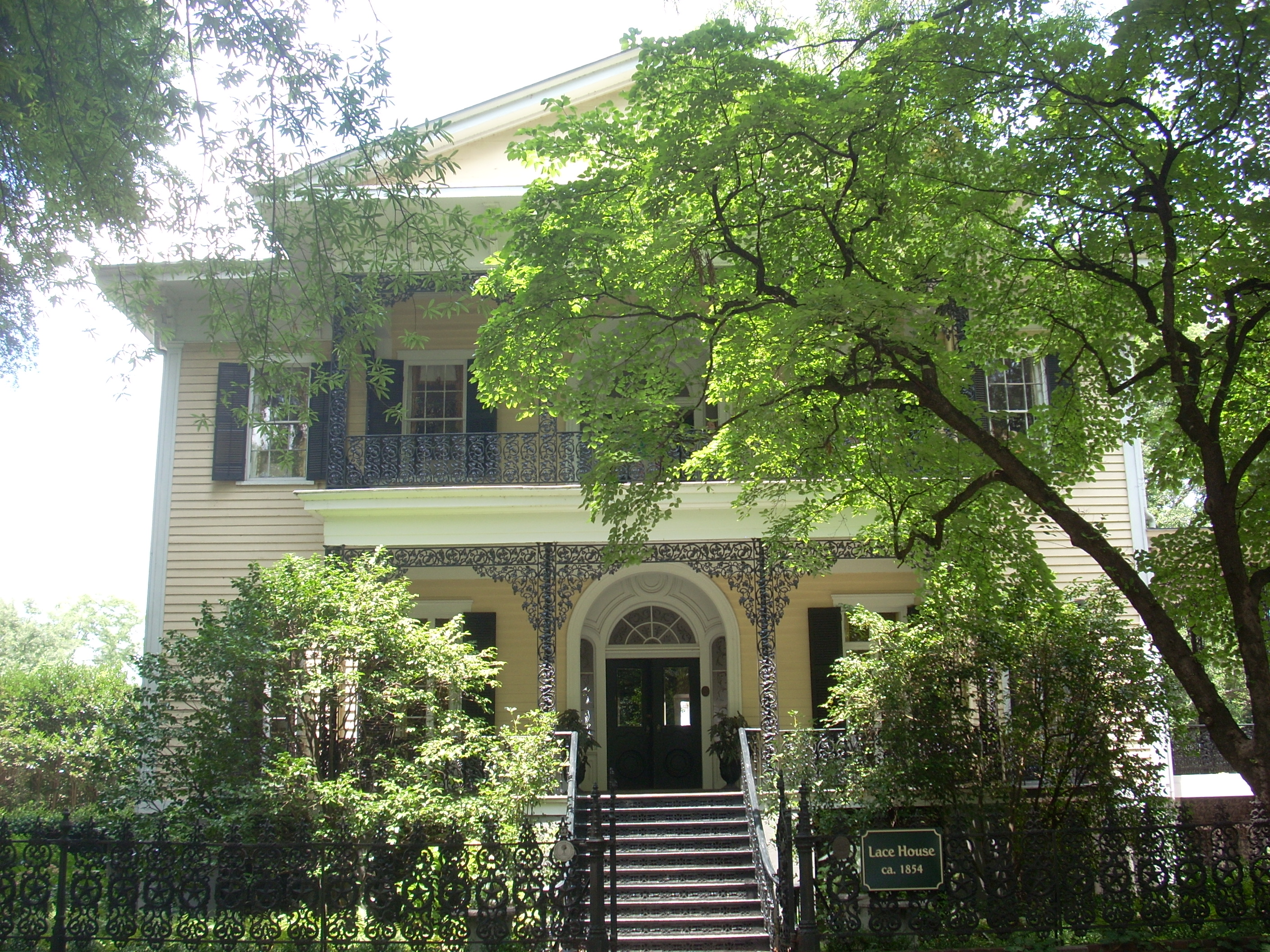
- Lace House, July 2012

- Location within South Carolina Location within the United States
- Location: 803 Richland St., Columbia, South Carolina
- Coordinates: 34°0′31″N 81°2′39″W
- Area: 0.8 acres (0.32 ha)
- Built: 1854
- NRHP reference No.: 69000173
- Added to NRHP: December 17, 1969

Lace House, also known as the Robertson House, is a historic home located at Columbia, South Carolina. It was built in 1854, and is a two-story, five-bay, frame dwelling on an English basement. It features a two-story, projecting front porch with ornate cast iron porch supports, and lace-like railings and trim.

It was added to the National Register of Historic Places in 1969. It is located in Columbia Historic District I. The house is currently used as a wedding venue.
