= Bert Calwell =

Australian rules footballer

Personal information
- Full name: Hubert James Calwell
- Born: 25 December 1898; Carlton, Victoria
- Died: 1 July 1962 (aged 63); Oakleigh, Victoria
- Original team: Ringwood
- Height: 173 cm (5 ft 8 in)

Playing career^{1}
Years	Club	Games (Goals)
1925–1927	Hawthorn	29 (3)
1927–1931	Camberwell (VFA)	53 (3)
Total		82 (6)
- ^{1} Playing statistics correct to the end of 1931.

Hubert James "Bert" Calwell (25 December 1898 – 1 July 1962) was an Australian rules footballer who played with Hawthorn in the Victorian Football League (VFL).

== Family ==
The fifth of six children born to George Lewis Calwell (1861–1955) and Caroline Alice Calwell (1868–1933), née Corrigan, Hubert James Calwell was born at Carlton North on 25 December 1898.

Bert Calwell was a younger brother of Carlton VFL players George Calwell and Clarrie Calwell.

== World War I ==
After trying to enlist at age 17 without his parents' consent in 1916, Calwell enlisted in 1917 and served in both England and France during the latter stages of World War I.

== Football ==
He commenced his football career at Ringwood before joining Hawthorn for the 1925 VFL season. Calwell made his Hawthorn debut in Round 3 and played in every game from then on during their first season of VFL football.

During the 1927 season he transferred to Camberwell Football Club. He played with Camberwell until 1931, serving as captain at the end of his period with the club.

== World War II ==
Calwell enlisted in the 2nd AIF in June 1940, aged 41, and served until October 1944.

== Death ==
Bert Calwell died at Oakleigh on 1 July 1962 and is buried at Springvale Botanical Cemetery.
