= Caldwell House (Shelbyville, Kentucky) =

- U.S. National Register of Historic Places
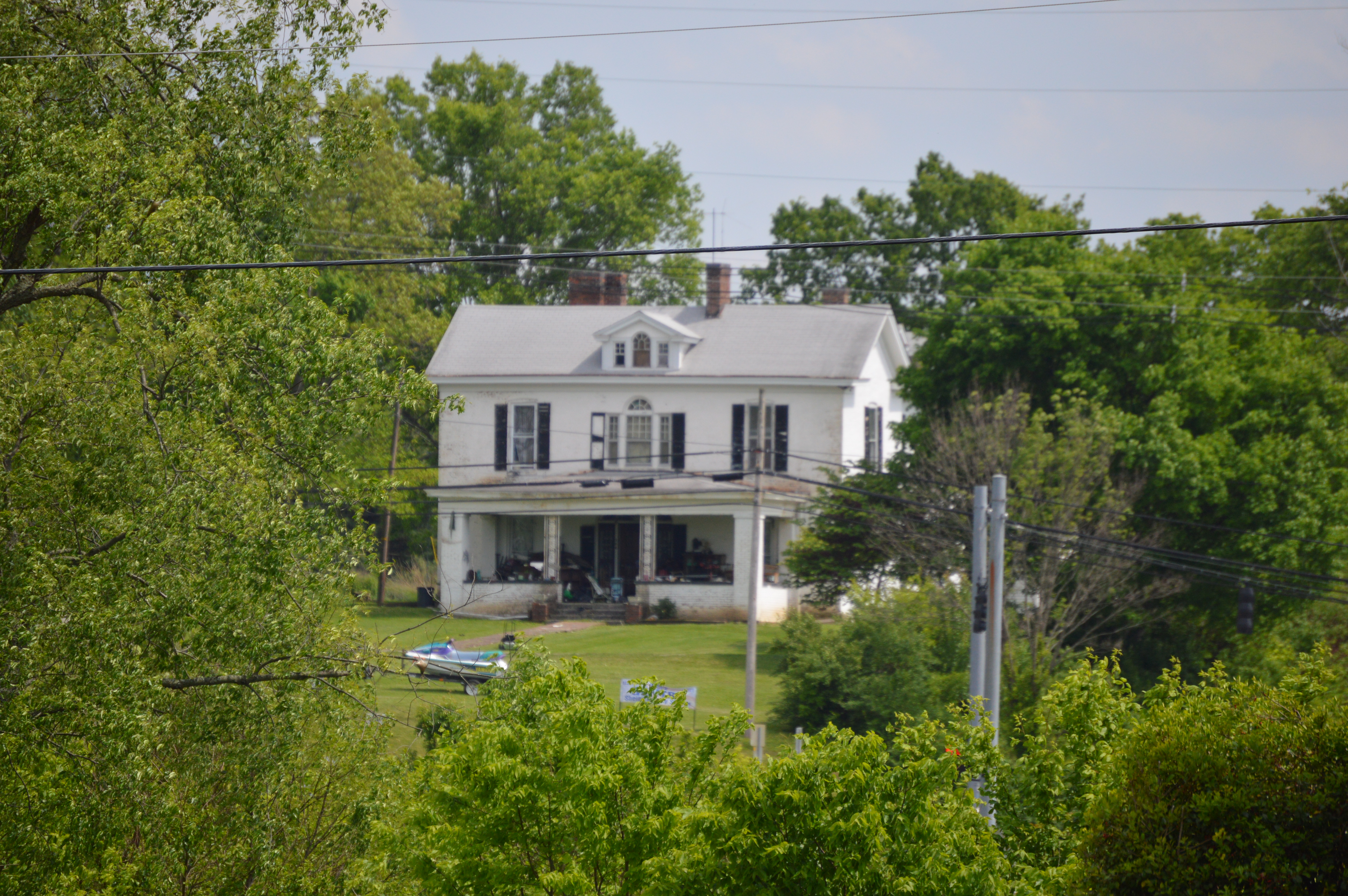

- Location within Kentucky Location within the United States
- Nearest city: Shelbyville, Kentucky
- Coordinates: 38°12′36″N 85°12′11″W
- Area: 1.5 acres (0.61 ha)
- Built: 1892
- Architectural style: Queen Anne
- MPS: Shelby County MRA
- NRHP reference No.: 88002939
- Added to NRHP: December 27, 1988

The Caldwell House, just east of Shelbyville, Kentucky, was built in 1892. It was listed on the National Register of Historic Places in 1988.

It is a two-story hip-roofed frame house with decorative features derived from Queen Anne pattern books. The listing included a second contributing building, an original frame barn.

It is located on U.S. Route 60 at Kentucky Route 53.
