= Caldwell Creek (Logan Creek tributary) =

Stream in Missouri

Coordinates: 36.5886694°N 90.6776173°W

Caldwell Creek is a stream in Ripley County in the U.S. state of Missouri. It is a tributary of Logan Creek.

Caldwell Creek has the name of the local Caldwell family.

== See also ==
- List of rivers of Missouri
