= Caldwell County =

Caldwell County is the name of several counties in the United States:

- Caldwell County, Kentucky
- Caldwell County, Missouri
- Caldwell County, North Carolina
- Caldwell County, Texas

== See also ==
- Caldwell Parish, Louisiana
