= Caldwell Township =

Caldwell Township may refer to the following places in the United States:

- Caldwell Township, Appanoose County, Iowa
- Caldwell Township, Michigan
- Caldwell Township, Callaway County, Missouri
- Fairfield Township, Essex County, New Jersey, formerly known as Cadwell Township
