= USS Caldwell (DD-605) =

Benson-class destroyer

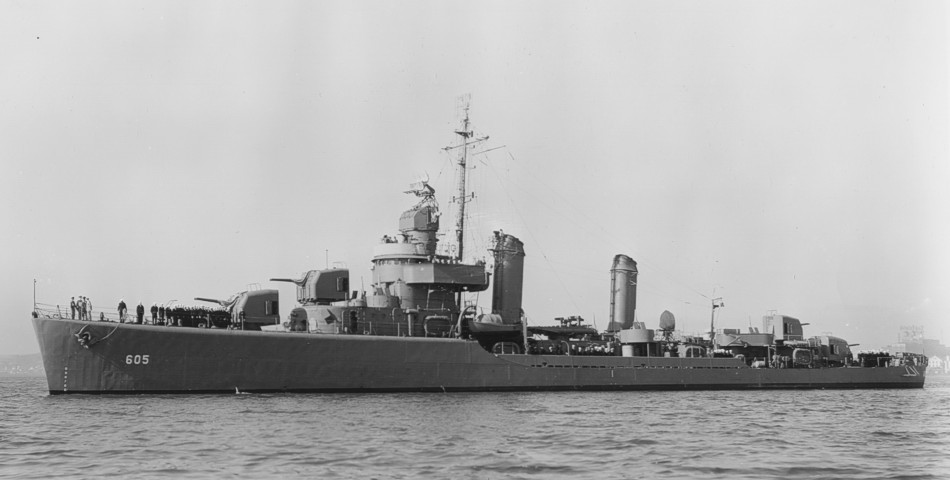
- USS Caldwell (DD-605) off San Francisco in June 1942

History

United States
- Name: USS Caldwell (DD-605)
- Namesake: James R. Caldwell
- Builder: Bethlehem Shipbuilding Corporation, San Francisco, California
- Launched: 15 January 1942
- Commissioned: 10 June 1942
- Decommissioned: 24 April 1946
- Stricken: 1 May 1965
- Fate: Sold for scrap on 4 November 1966

General characteristics
- Class & type: Benson-class destroyer
- Displacement: 1,620 tons
- Length: 348 ft 2 in (106.12 m)
- Beam: 36 ft 1 in (11.00 m)
- Draught: 17 ft 6 in (5.33 m)
- Speed: 36.5
- Complement: 276
- Armament: 5 x 5 in (130 mm)/38 guns, 10 x 21 inch (533 mm) ntt.

USS Caldwell (DD-605) was a Benson-class destroyer in the United States Navy during World War II. She was named for James R. Caldwell.

Caldwell was launched 15 January 1942 by Bethlehem Steel Corporation, San Francisco, California; sponsored by Miss A. Caldwell; and commissioned 10 June 1942, Lieutenant Commander J. F. Newman, Jr., in command.

== Service history ==
On 11 September 1942, Caldwell turned her bow northward from San Francisco and joined the screen of an Aleutians-bound convoy. For the next 9 months the destroyer battled foul weather as she shepherded shipping and cruised with TG 8.6 in unrewarded search for the enemy in Alaskan waters. Her guns pounded Attu twice in preparation for the assault which would recapture that American outpost. When soldiers of the 17th and 32d Infantry stormed ashore on 11 May 1943, they were covered to the southward by Caldwell and the other ships of TG 16.6. With Attu taken, the destroyer returned to convoy escort; Caldwell sailed in the screen of the force which carried reinforcements to Kiska, Alaska on 16 August 1943, the day after the first landings on that rugged island.

Caldwell left the fog, mists, and cold of the Aleutians behind in September 1943, and steamed south to join TF 15 for the 18 September air strikes which destroyed half of the enemy airplanes on Tarawa. Action followed thick and fast for the next month as the destroyer joined TF 14, the largest fast carrier force yet organized, in blasting Wake Island. Caldwell bombarded Peale and Wake Islands and screened aircraft carriers launching air attacks against those islets.

The destroyer's next mission found her covering LSTs in the followup to the invasion of Makin, Gilbert Islands. Her charges safely delivered on 21 November, Caldwell took station on antisubmarine and air defense patrol for the next week. A well-earned rest came in the form of duty escorting a San Francisco-bound convoy. After a brief overhaul, the destroyer returned to action with TF 52 in the invasion of Kwajalein and Majuro 31 January 1944. During the continual maneuvering, characteristic of carrier task forces, Caldwell and White Plains collided; the destroyer remained with the task force another week, then returned to Pearl Harbor for repairs. At sea again, Caldwell joined TF 58 in the Palau-Yap-Ulithi-Woleai raids (30 March-1 April); strikes on New Guinea in support of Army landings on that island (22–24 April); and the Truk-Satawan-Ponape raids (29 April-1 May). She remained on patrol in the Marshall Islands until mid-August when she sailed to Pearl Harbor for much-needed upkeep.

Caldwell's next assignment sent her by way of Ulithi and Manus to screen convoys supplying the forces which had landed in the Philippines. On 11 December, Caldwell had a near miss with a kamikaze, and the next day, while escorting landing craft to Ormoc Bay, she bore the brunt of the air attack. Hit on the bridge simultaneously by a kamikaze and fragments from a two-bomb straddle, the destroyer suffered 33 killed and 40 wounded including the commanding officer. Despite the heavy damage, Caldwell's after guns continued to fire on enemy planes, while her damage control parties saved the ship.

Temporary repairs made at San Pedro Bay, Philippines, fitted Caldwell for the voyage to San Francisco where she was again put in fighting trim. April 1945 saw the destroyer once more in her familiar role as convoy escort, this time in support of the invasion of Tarakan, Borneo. Caldwell bombarded Tarakan (11–12 May), then moved to cover the minesweeping operations off Brunei Bay. Here, on 27 June, she detonated an influence-type mine, but escaped with moderate damage and no casualties. After temporary repairs at Victoria, Australia, she sailed to San Pedro Bay, P.I., for final repairs. She was there when hostilities ended. Escort of landing craft convoys to Okinawa and Leyte followed in September and October 1945. After a visit to Tokyo Bay, Caldwell returned to the States; she was placed out of commission in reserve at Charleston, South Carolina, on 24 April 1946. She was struck 1 May 1965 and sold for scrap on 4 November 1966.

== Awards ==
Caldwell received eight battle stars for service in World War II.
