= Caldwell (given name) =

Caldwell is the given name of:

- Caldwell Hart Colt (1858–1894), American inventor and yachtsman and son of Samuel Colt
- Caldwell Edwards (1841–1922), U.S. Representative from Montana
- Caldwell Esselstyn (born 1933), American cardiologist and former Olympic rowing champion
- Caldwell Jackson, American politician
- Caldwell Jones (1950–2014), American retired basketball player
- Caldwell Stewart (1907–1967), Canadian politician and lawyer

== Middle names ==
- M. Caldwell Butler (1925–2014), former U.S. Representative from Virginia
- Velma Caldwell Melville (1852–1924), American writer and poet
