= George Calwell =

Australian rules footballer

Personal information
- Full name: George Lewis Calwell
- Born: 2 July 1891; Carlton, Victoria
- Died: 24 August 1971 (aged 80); Richmond, Victoria
- Original team: Clifton's Rope Works
- Height: 178 cm (5 ft 10 in)
- Weight: 76 kg (168 lb)

Playing career^{1}
Years	Club	Games (Goals)
1914–16	Carlton	24 (3)
- ^{1} Playing statistics correct to the end of 1916.

George Lewis Calwell (2 July 1891 – 24 August 1971) was an Australian rules footballer who played for Carlton in the Victorian Football League (VFL).

Calwell was born in Carlton, the eldest child of George Lewis Calwell snr and Caroline Alice Corrigan. Two of his younger brothers, Clarrie and Bert, also played VFL football. Originally from the Clifton's Rope Works team, Calwell made his league debut for Carlton in 1914 and, despite not initially taking part in that year's finals series, was recalled for the Grand Final. Carlton wanted his pace around the packs and put Calwell in the first ruck, a decision which helped them to claim the premiership.

A foot injury caused Calwell to miss playing in Carlton's premiership team the following season. By now he had enlisted for active service and was assigned to the Corps of Engineers for specialist training at Langwarrin. He was however picked in the 1916 VFL Grand Final, his first match since late in the 1915 season. Just weeks after the Grand Final, Calwell was told by army doctors that he was suffering from a degenerative condition in the joints of the toes. He was discharged as medically unfit and never played for Carlton again.

Off-field, Calwell initially worked as a policeman before being dismissed after firing a pistol and endangering colleagues during a struggle with fellow officers at the Russell-street police station in 1913; he faced trial but was found not guilty. He later worked as a carpenter. In 1923, Calwell was convicted of assault with intent to commit an offence against a 21-year-old woman who was boarding at his and his wife's Hawksburn home, and was sentenced to nine months imprisonment.
