= Sam Levine (politician) =

American politician

Samuel Michele Levine (September 18, 1890 – May 21, 1965) was an American politician. A member of the Democratic Party, he served in the Arkansas House of Representatives and the Arkansas Senate. He was Jewish.
