= James Caldwell House =

- U.S. National Register of Historic Places
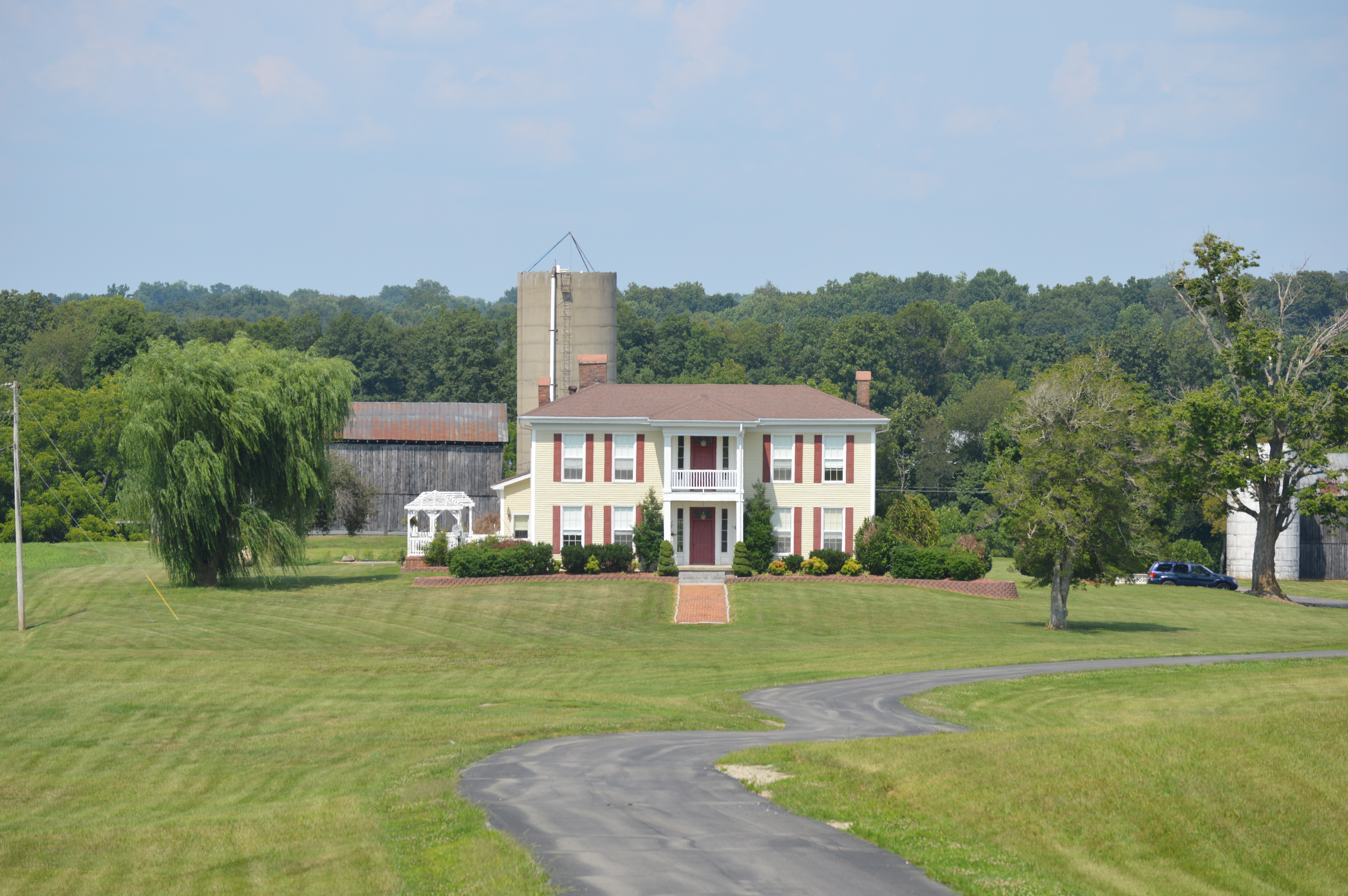

- Location within Kentucky Location within the United States
- Nearest city: Campbellsville, Kentucky
- Coordinates: 37°15′56″N 85°22′00″W
- Area: 5.4 acres (2.2 ha)
- Built: 1854
- Architectural style: Greek Revival
- NRHP reference No.: 11000681
- Added to NRHP: October 3, 2011

The James Caldwell House, at 105 Colonial Dr. in Taylor County, Kentucky near Campbellsville, Kentucky, was built in 1854–55. It was listed on the National Register of Historic Places in 2011.

It is Greek Revival in style, and was built by African American slaves during 1854–55. It was renovated in 1989.

It is on a portion of a 1,000 acres (4.0 km^{2}) property owned by settlers John and Elizabeth Fulton Caldwell, who came to the area in 1801.
