= Samuel Caldwell House =

Historic house in Ohio, United States

- U.S. National Register of Historic Places
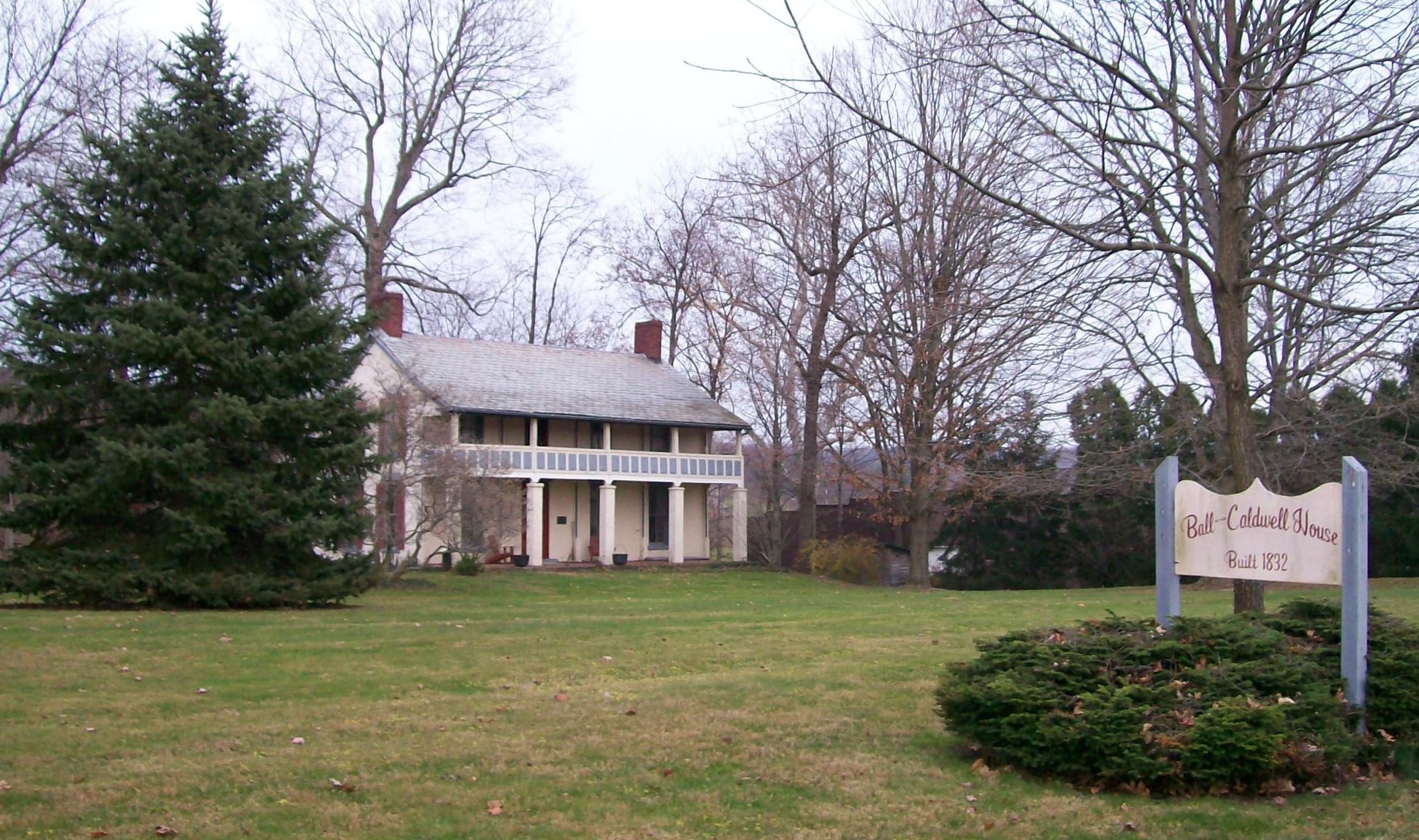
- Front of the house and lawn

- Location within Ohio Location within the United States
- Location: East and Locust Sts., Caldwell, Ohio
- Coordinates: 39°44′40″N 81°30′47″W
- Area: 1 acre (0.40 ha)
- Built: 1832
- NRHP reference No.: 80003201
- Added to NRHP: March 11, 1980

The Samuel Caldwell House is a historic house in the village of Caldwell, Ohio, United States. Erected in 1832, it is the oldest house in the village.

Surveyor Robert Caldwell settled at the site of the present house in 1809, becoming the first settler in the vicinity. His son Samuel expanded the farm and began to diversify, building both a gristmill and a sawmill on his property by 1836. Noble County was formed in 1851, being the last of Ohio's counties to be created. Soon after the county's establishment, Caldwell agreed to donate land on his farm for public purposes; in 1857, part of this land was chosen as the site of the new county seat, and he was made the namesake of the new village. Caldwell's family continued to own and operate the remnant portion of the farm into the 1920s.

Built of brick on a stone foundation, Caldwell's house is a two-story structure constructed in an undeterminate architectural style. The original portion of the house is rectangular, although a frame addition was later attached to the rear of the house.

In 1980, the Samuel Caldwell House was listed on the National Register of Historic Places, qualifying both because of its role in local history and because of its place as the home of a leading local citizen. Four lesser but related buildings on the same property were also designated as historic as part of the process. The Caldwell House is seen as a significant element in local history primarily because of the manner in which the village of Caldwell was developed: the Caldwell farm was typical of the way in which many early Ohio communities were developed from land donated from a large farm. It is one of nine Noble County properties on the National Register, and one of two in Caldwell, along with the building that historically housed the county jail and sheriff's office.
