= Caldwell-Hopson House =

- Caldwell--Hopson House
- U.S. National Register of Historic Places
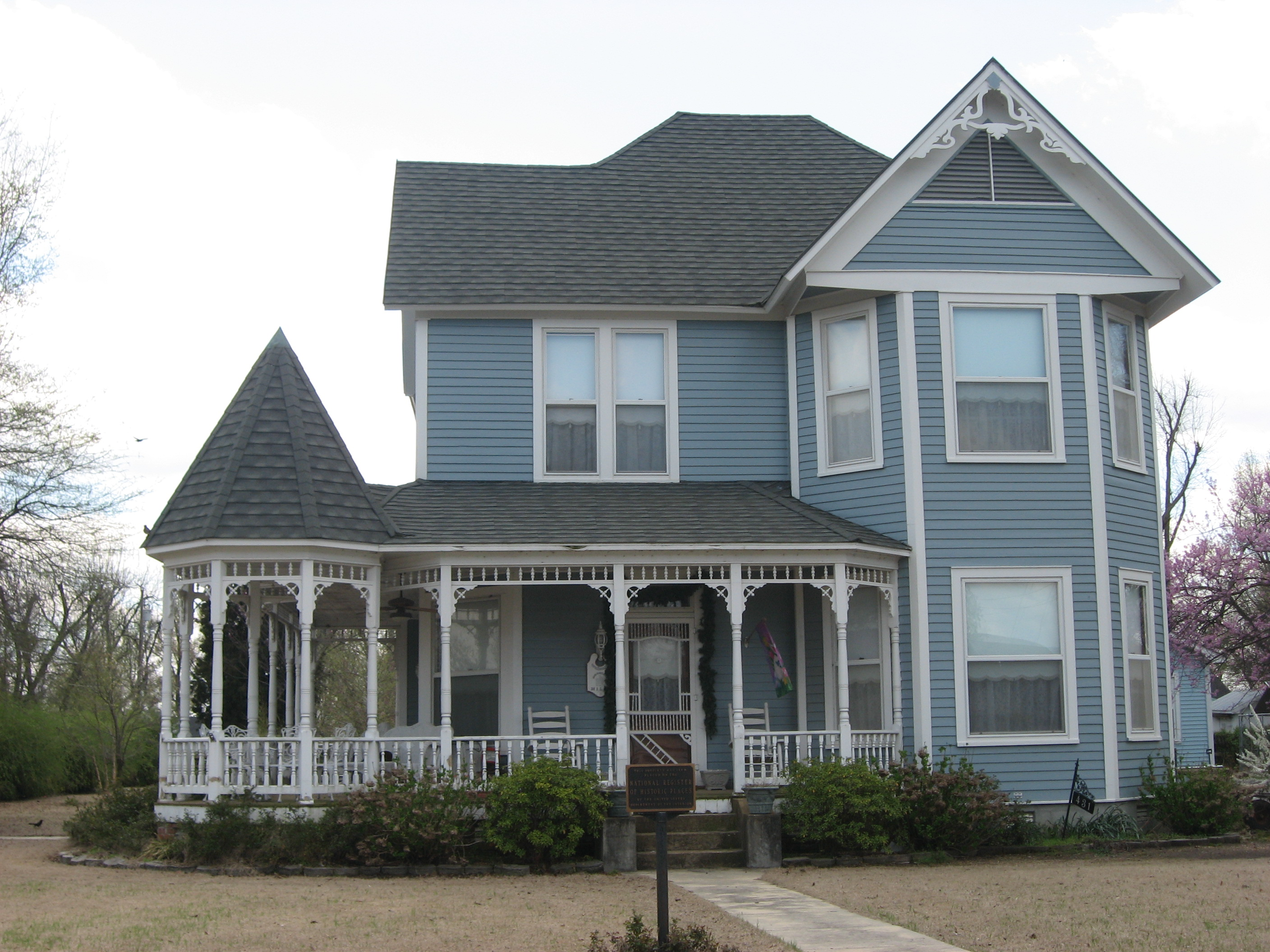

- Location within Tennessee
- Location: 431 Wynn St., Tiptonville, Tennessee
- Coordinates: 36°22′34″N 89°28′50″W
- Area: less than one acre
- Built: c.1891
- Architectural style: Queen Anne
- NRHP reference No.: 93000150
- Added to NRHP: March 11, 1993

The Caldwell-Hopson House in Tiptonville, Tennessee, United States, is a two-story weatherboarded frame house built in about 1891 which is Queen Anne-influenced in style. It was listed on the National Register of Historic Places in 1993.

== History ==
The house was constructed by an unknown builder in 1891 for Aaron Caldwell, a Russian Jewish immigrant who ran a clothing store in Tiptonville.

According to its NRHP nomination, "Its steeply pitched roof, asymmetrical facade, two story bay, and distinctive porch make Caldwell-Hopson House a prime example of a Queen Anne-influenced residence in this small farming community. It is one of the few remaining houses of historic value in the county and is an excellent example of craftsmanship, construction, and design."
