= Caldwell–Hampton–Boylston House =

Historic house in South Carolina, United States

- U.S. National Register of Historic Places
- U.S. Historic district – Contributing property
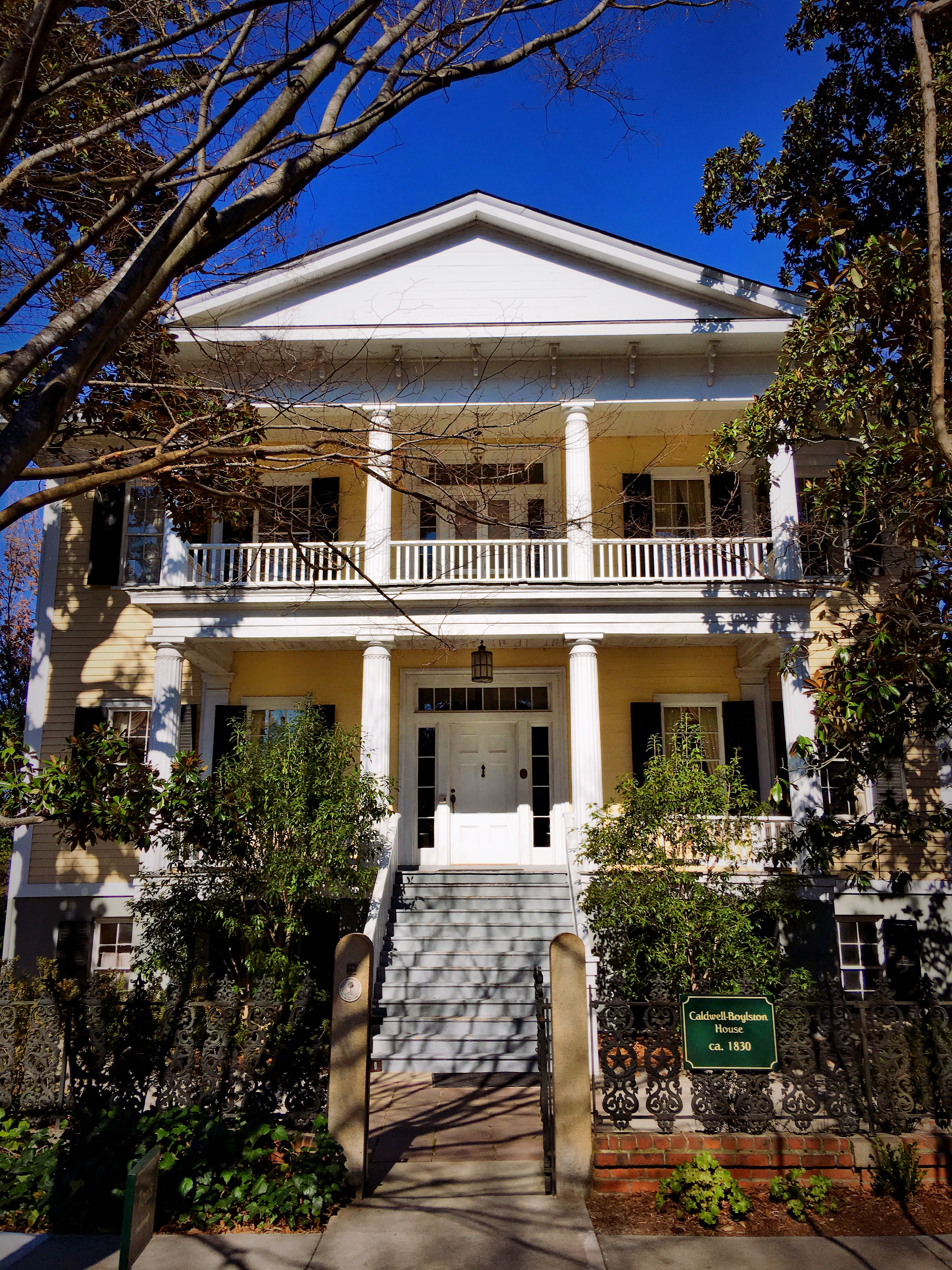

- Location within South Carolina Location within the United States
- Location: 829 Richland St. Columbia, South Carolina
- Coordinates: 34°0′32″N 81°2′36″W
- Area: 2 acres (0.81 ha)
- Built: c. 1820-1830
- Architectural style: Greek Revival
- NRHP reference No.: 71000796
- Added to NRHP: May 6, 1971

Caldwell–Hampton–Boylston House is a historic home located at Columbia, South Carolina. It was built between 1820 and 1830, and is a three-story, five-bay, clapboard clad frame dwelling in the Greek Revival style. It features a two-story, projecting front porch. Also on the property is contributing ironwork and brick fencing (c. 1855), and a stable/carriage house, garden gazebo, and tea house. In 1874–1876, it was the residence of South Carolina Reconstruction governor Daniel H. Chamberlain, who purchased the house in 1869.

It was added to the National Register of Historic Places in 1971. It is located in Columbia Historic District I.
