= Caldwell High School =

Caldwell High School may refer to:

In the United States:

- Caldwell High School (Caldwell, Idaho), Caldwell, Idaho
- Caldwell High School (Caldwell, Kansas), Caldwell, Kansas
- Caldwell County High School, Princeton, Kentucky
- James Caldwell High School, West Caldwell, New Jersey
- Caldwell County Gateway School, Granite Falls, North Carolina
- Caldwell County Career Center, Hudson, North Carolina
- South Caldwell High School, Hudson, North Carolina
- West Caldwell High School, Lenoir, North Carolina
- Caldwell High School (Caldwell, Ohio), Caldwell, Ohio
- Caldwell High School (Caldwell, Texas), Caldwell, Texas
