= Caldwell Hall (Pine Bluff, Arkansas) =

- U.S. National Register of Historic Places
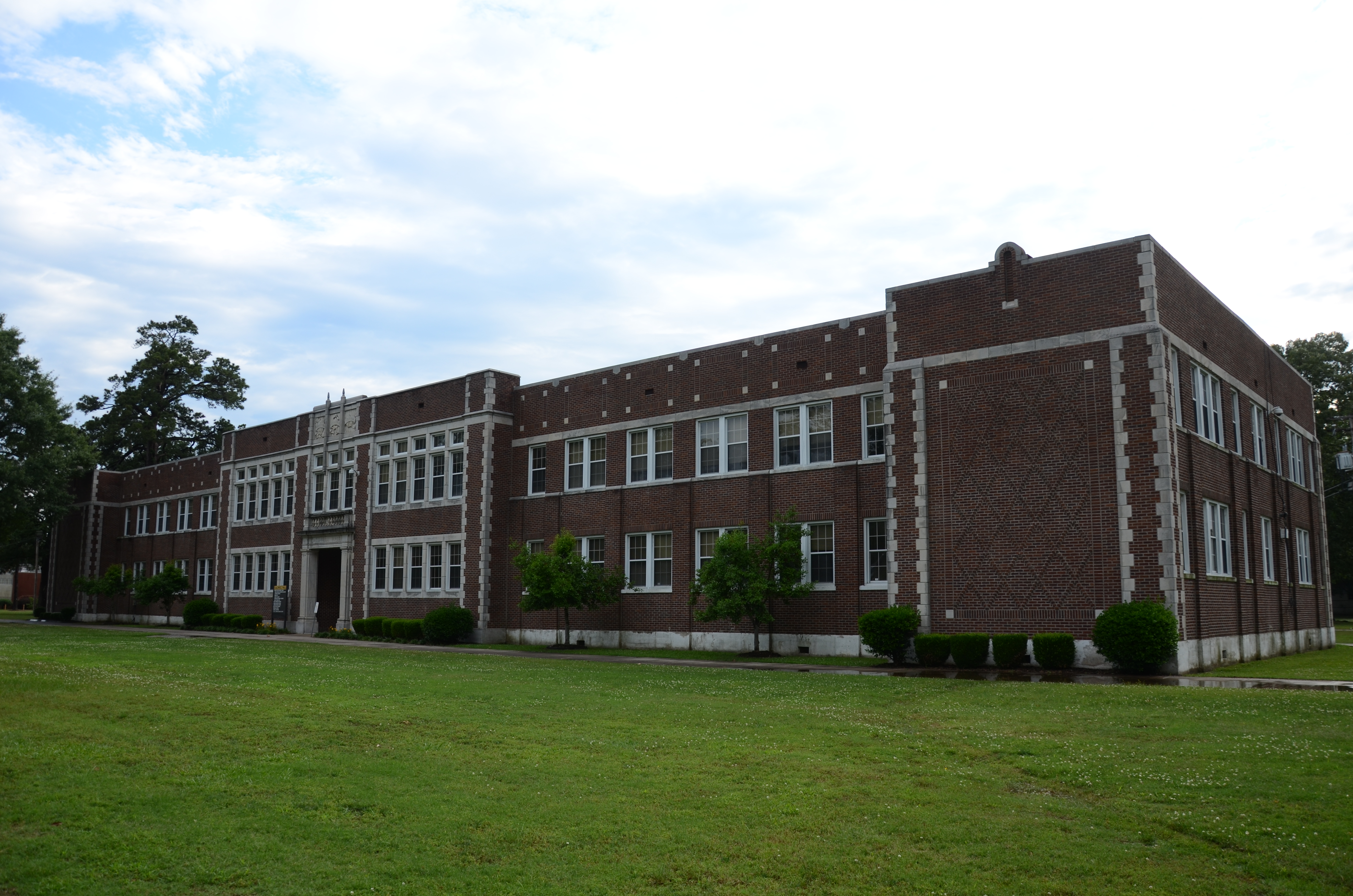

- Location within Arkansas Location within the United States
- Location: University Drive, University of Arkansas at Pine Bluff, Pine Bluff, Arkansas
- Coordinates: 34°14′32″N 92°1′10″W
- Area: less than one acre
- Built: 1928
- Architect: Thompson, Sanders, & Ginocchio
- Architectural style: Late Gothic Revival
- MPS: Thompson, Charles L., Design Collection TR
- NRHP reference No.: 82000843
- Added to NRHP: December 22, 1982

Caldwell Hall occupies a central position on the campus of the University of Arkansas at Pine Bluff in Pine Bluff, Arkansas. It is a large, T-shaped two-story brick building with Late Gothic Revival features, which was built in 1928 to a design by the noted Arkansas architectural firm Thompson, Sanders, & Ginocchio. Its central entrance section has Art Deco features in stone panels above the entrance, and fluted stone piers that rise to streamlined finials.

The building was listed on the National Register of Historic Places in 1982.
