= Luman L. Cadwell =

Medal of Honor recipient (1836–1925)

- Born: May 22, 1836
- Died: July 8, 1925 (aged 89)
- Burial place: Phelps Cemetery, Decorah, Iowa
- Military career
- Allegiance: United States of America
- Branch: United States Army
- Service years: 1862 - 1865
- Rank: First Lieutenant
- Unit: (New York (state)) 2nd Regiment New York Veteran Volunteer Cavalry - Company B
- Awards: Medal of Honor

Luman L. Cadwell (May 22, 1836 – July 8, 1925) was an American soldier who fought in the American Civil War. Cadwell received the country's highest award for bravery during combat, the Medal of Honor, for his action at the Alabama Bayou, Louisiana on September 20, 1864. He was honored with the award on August 17, 1894.

== Biography ==
Cadwell was born in 1836 and enlisted into the 2nd New York Veteran Cavalry. On September 20, 1864 Cadwell along with another soldier, Albert Westinghouse, swam across the 150 foot Alabama Bayou near New Orleans in order to retrieve a small boat which his company used to gain access to a Confederate camp stationed on an island in the middle of the Bayou and destroy buildings, supplies, artillery and capture Confederate forces.

== Medal of Honor citation ==
Swam the bayou under fire of the enemy and captured and brought off a boat by means of which the command crossed and routed the enemy.

== See also ==
- List of American Civil War Medal of Honor recipients: A–F
