= Caldwell School =

- U.S. National Register of Historic Places
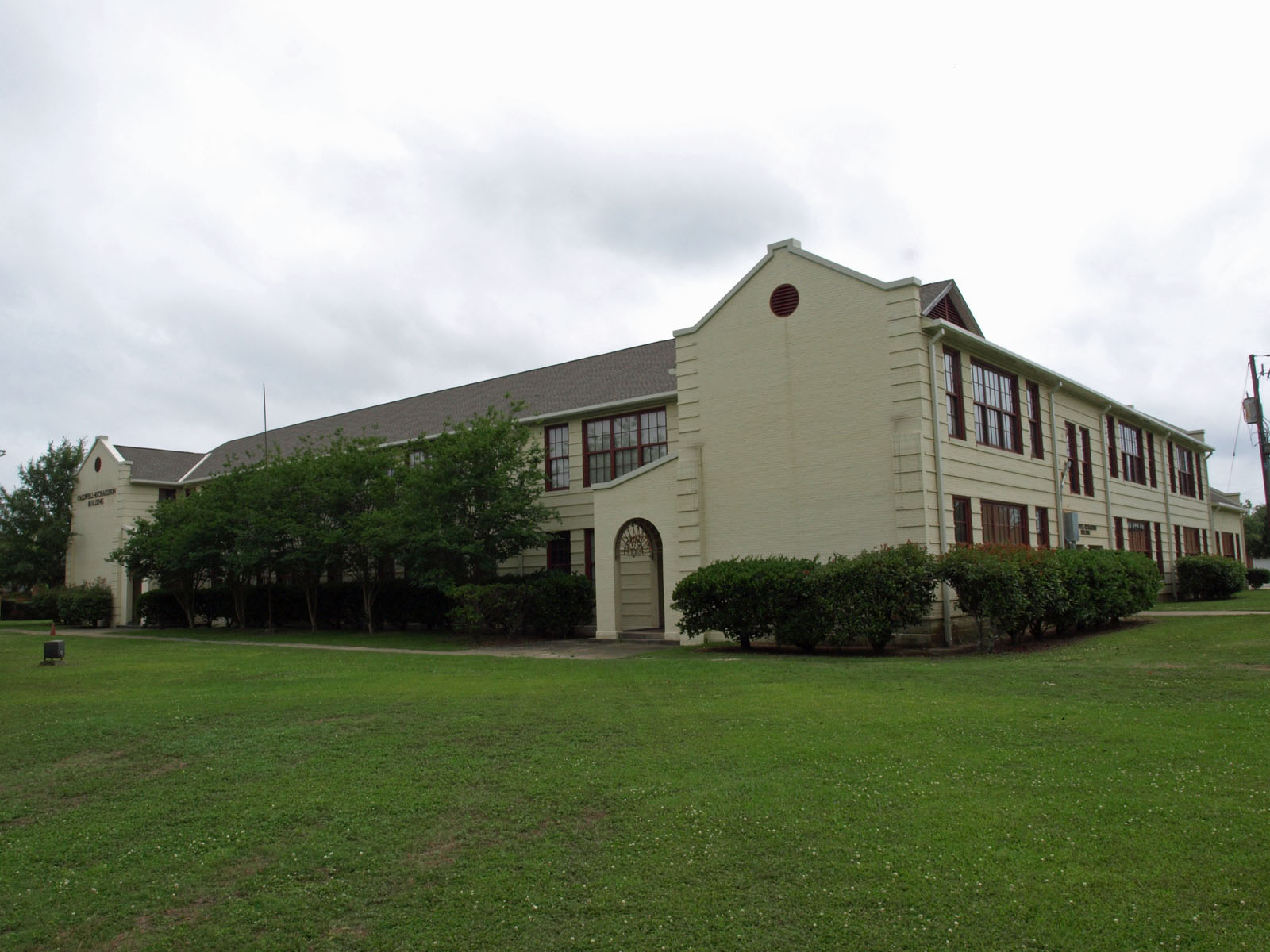
- The former Caldwell School building in 2012

- Location within Mobile, Alabama Location within Alabama Location within the United States
- Location: 351 N. Broad St. Mobile, Alabama
- Coordinates: 30°41′35″N 88°3′27″W
- Built: 1947
- NRHP reference No.: 11000898
- Added to NRHP: December 20, 2011

The Caldwell School is a historic former black school building in Mobile, Alabama. The school, originally named the Broad Street Academy, was the first public high school for African Americans in the city. It was founded in 1887, with William A. Caldwell serving as the first principal.

The original building was torn down and replaced with the current one in 1947. Upon reopening in the new building, it served as an African American elementary school. It was called the Caldwell School in honor of its first principal from this point until closing during the 1960s.

Following the closure of the school the building was purchased by Bishop State Community College, a historically African American junior college. It is currently the oldest building on the Broad Street college campus and is utilized for administrative and teaching purposes. It was added to the National Register of Historic Places on December 20, 2011.
