= Caldwell Creek (St. Francis River tributary) =

Stream in the U.S. state of Missouri

Caldwell Creek is a stream in Wayne County in the U.S. state of Missouri. It is a tributary of the St. Francis River.

The stream headwaters arise just south of Missouri Route HH and east of US Route 67 at 37°03′29″N 90°28′18″W and it flows to the southeast. The confluence with the St. Francis is within the waters of Lake Wappapello south of the Holiday Landing campground at 37°01′16″N 90°25′16″W. The confluence is about six miles south of Greenville.

Caldwell Creek has the name of James Caldwell, a pioneer citizen.

== See also ==
- List of rivers of Missouri
