= Caldwell House (McRae, Arkansas) =

Historic house in Arkansas, United States

- U.S. National Register of Historic Places
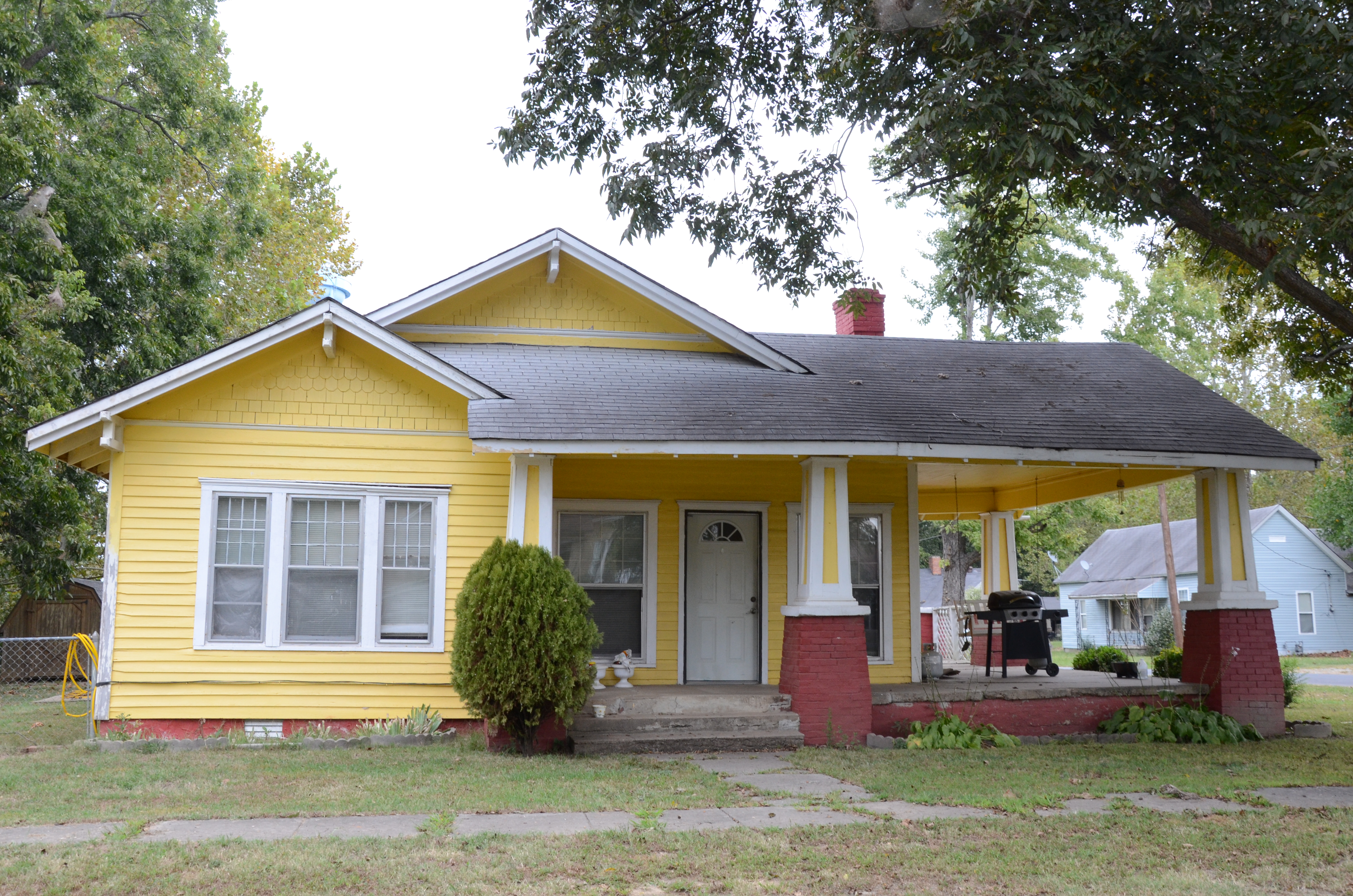

- Location within Arkansas Location within the United States
- Location: Jct. of E. 2nd and Smith Sts., McRae, Arkansas
- Coordinates: 35°6′43″N 91°49′19″W
- Area: less than one acre
- Built: 1925
- Architectural style: Bungalow/craftsman
- MPS: White County MPS
- NRHP reference No.: 91001347
- Added to NRHP: September 5, 1991

The Caldwell House is a historic house at Smith and East 2nd Streets in McRae, Arkansas. It is a single story wood-frame structure with Craftsman styling. Its main gable faces front, with a projecting side gable section to the right, behind a porch supported by sloping posts on brick piers. Built about 1925, it is the community's finest example of Craftsman architecture.

The house was listed on the National Register of Historic Places in 1991.

== See also ==
- National Register of Historic Places listings in White County, Arkansas
