= USS Caldwell (DD-69) =

Caldwell-class destroyer

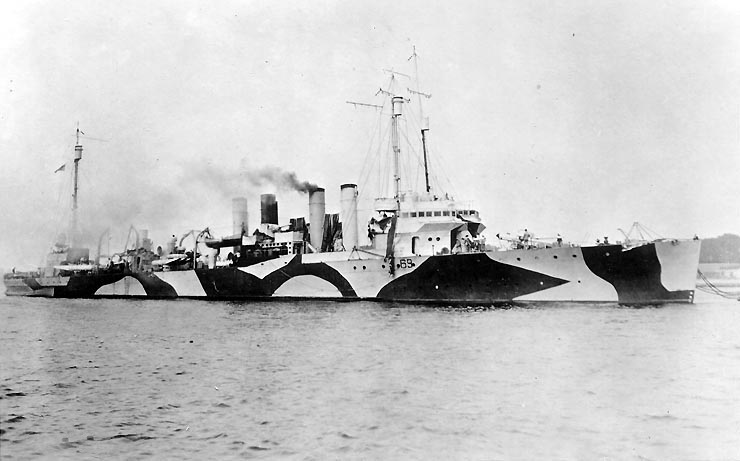
- USS Caldwell (DD-69).

History

United States
- Name: USS Caldwell (DD-69)
- Namesake: James R. Caldwell
- Builder: Mare Island Navy Yard
- Laid down: 9 December 1916
- Launched: 10 July 1917
- Commissioned: 1 December 1917
- Decommissioned: 27 June 1922
- Stricken: 7 January 1936
- Fate: Scrapped

General characteristics
- Class & type: Caldwell-class destroyer
- Displacement: 1,262 long tons (1,282 t) (standard); 1,379 long tons (1,401 t) (deep load)
- Length: 315 ft 6 in (96.2 m)
- Beam: 30 ft 7 in (9.32 m)
- Draught: 8 ft 10 in (2.7 m)
- Installed power: 18,500 shp (13,800 kW); 4 Thornycroft boilers
- Propulsion: 2 shafts, 2 steam turbines
- Speed: 30 knots (56 km/h; 35 mph)
- Range: 2,500 nautical miles (4,600 km; 2,900 mi) at 20 knots (37 km/h; 23 mph)
- Complement: 5 officers, 95 enlisted men
- Armament: 4 × single 4-inch (102 mm) guns; 2 × single 1-pounder AA guns; 4 × triple 21 inch (533 mm) torpedo tubes

USS Caldwell (DD-69) was the lead ship of her class of destroyers built for the United States Navy in the 1910s.

== Description ==
The Caldwells were a transitional design between the "thousand-tonners" of the Sampson-class and the mass-produced destroyers built during World War I. They introduced the flush-deck and were known as the first of the "flush deckers" that were so wet in heavy weather. The ship displaced 1,262 long tons (1,282 t) at standard load and 1,379 long tons (1,401 t) at deep load. They had an overall length of 315 feet 6 inches (96.2 m), a beam of 30 feet 7 inches (9.3 m) and a draught of 8 feet 10 inches (2.7 m). They had a crew of 5 officers and 95 enlisted men.

The propulsion arrangements differed between the ships of the class. Caldwell was powered by two Curtis steam turbines, each driving one propeller shaft, using steam provided by four Thornycroft boilers. The turbines developed a total of 18,500 shaft horsepower (13,800 kW) and were designed to reach a speed of 30 knots (56 km/h; 35 mph). Caldwell reached 31.7 kilotonnes (31,200 long tons; 34,900 short tons) during sea trials. The ships carried a maximum of 205 long tons (208 t) of fuel oil that gave them a range of 2,500 nautical miles (4,600 km; 2,900 mi) at 20 knots (37 km/h; 23 mph).

The ships were armed with four 4-inch (102 mm) guns in single mounts and were fitted with two 1-pounder guns for anti-aircraft defense. Their primary weapon, though, was their torpedo battery of a dozen 21 inch (533 mm) torpedo tubes in four triple mounts. During World War I, the 1-pounders were replaced by 3-inch (76 mm) anti-aircraft (AA) guns and a "Y-gun" depth charge thrower replaced the aft AA gun and the searchlight.

== Construction and career ==
Caldwell was launched 10 July 1917 by Mare Island Navy Yard, sponsored by Miss C. Caldwell, and commissioned 1 December 1917, Lieutenant Commander B. McCandless in command. She was the first Navy ship named for Lieutenant James R. Caldwell (1778-1804). Ordered to join the Atlantic Fleet, Caldwell reached Norfolk, Virginia, 8 January 1918, and Queenstown, Ireland, 5 March. She participated in patrol and convoy escort duty, which were interrupted when Caldwell aided in urgent experimental work on underwater listening devices to employ against German submarines. After the close of World War I, Caldwell transported troops to Brest, France, and while there joined the escort for President Woodrow Wilson in George Washington as he entered the harbor.

Caldwell returned home for operations with the Norfolk Division, Destroyer Force, Atlantic Fleet, and with Destroyer Squadron 3 along the United States East Coast during 1919. Placed in reserve in August 1920, she operated with a reduced complement out of Charleston, South Carolina, and Newport, Rhode Island. She was decommissioned at Philadelphia Navy Yard 27 June 1922. She was sold there 30 June 1936.
