= James R. Caldwell =

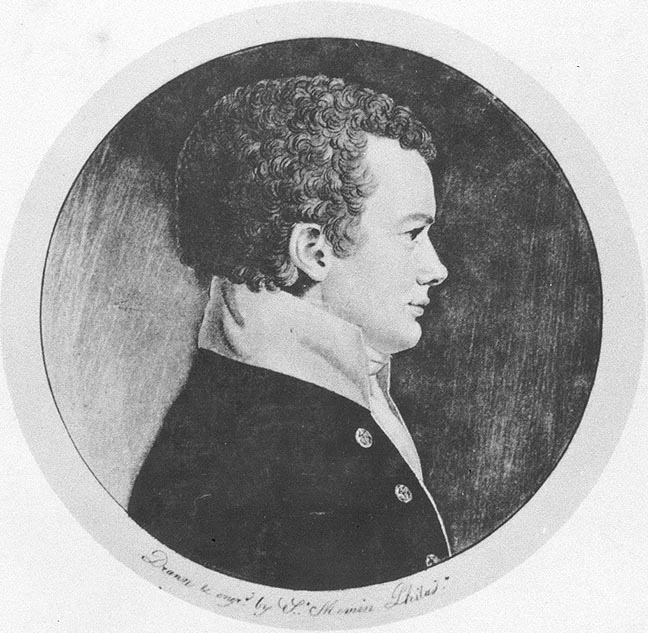
- Lieutenant James R. Caldwell
- Born: 1 November 1778; Philadelphia, Pennsylvania
- Died: 7 August 1804 (aged 25) off Tripoli, North Africa
- Occupation: Officer in the U.S. Navy

James R. Caldwell (November 1, 1778 - August 7, 1804) was an officer in the United States Navy who served in the Quasi-War with France and the First Barbary War.

== Biography ==
Born in Philadelphia, Pennsylvania, Caldwell was appointed a midshipman 22 May 1798. During the Quasi-War with France, he served in the frigate United States, schooner Experiment and armed ship Ganges in the West Indies.

Commissioned a lieutenant in 1800, from late 1801 into 1803 Lieutenant Caldwell was an officer of the frigate Constellation during the initial phase of the war with Tripoli. In mid-1803, he returned to the Mediterranean in the brig Siren to participate in further operations against that piratical North African state. Caldwell distinguished himself in a boat action on 7 July 1804 and also took part in an attack on 3 August that resulted in the capture of three vessels that were taken into the Navy as gunboats. One of these, Gunboat Number 9, was under Caldwell's command when the U.S. squadron again bombarded Tripoli on 7 August 1804. While hotly engaged with an enemy battery, a hot shot penetrated her magazine and Gunboat Number 9 blew up. Lieutenant Caldwell and eleven others were killed or mortally wounded in the explosion.

== Namesakes ==
Two U.S. Navy ships have been named USS Caldwell in his honor.
