= Arsenal Hill (Columbia, South Carolina) =

- U.S. National Register of Historic Places
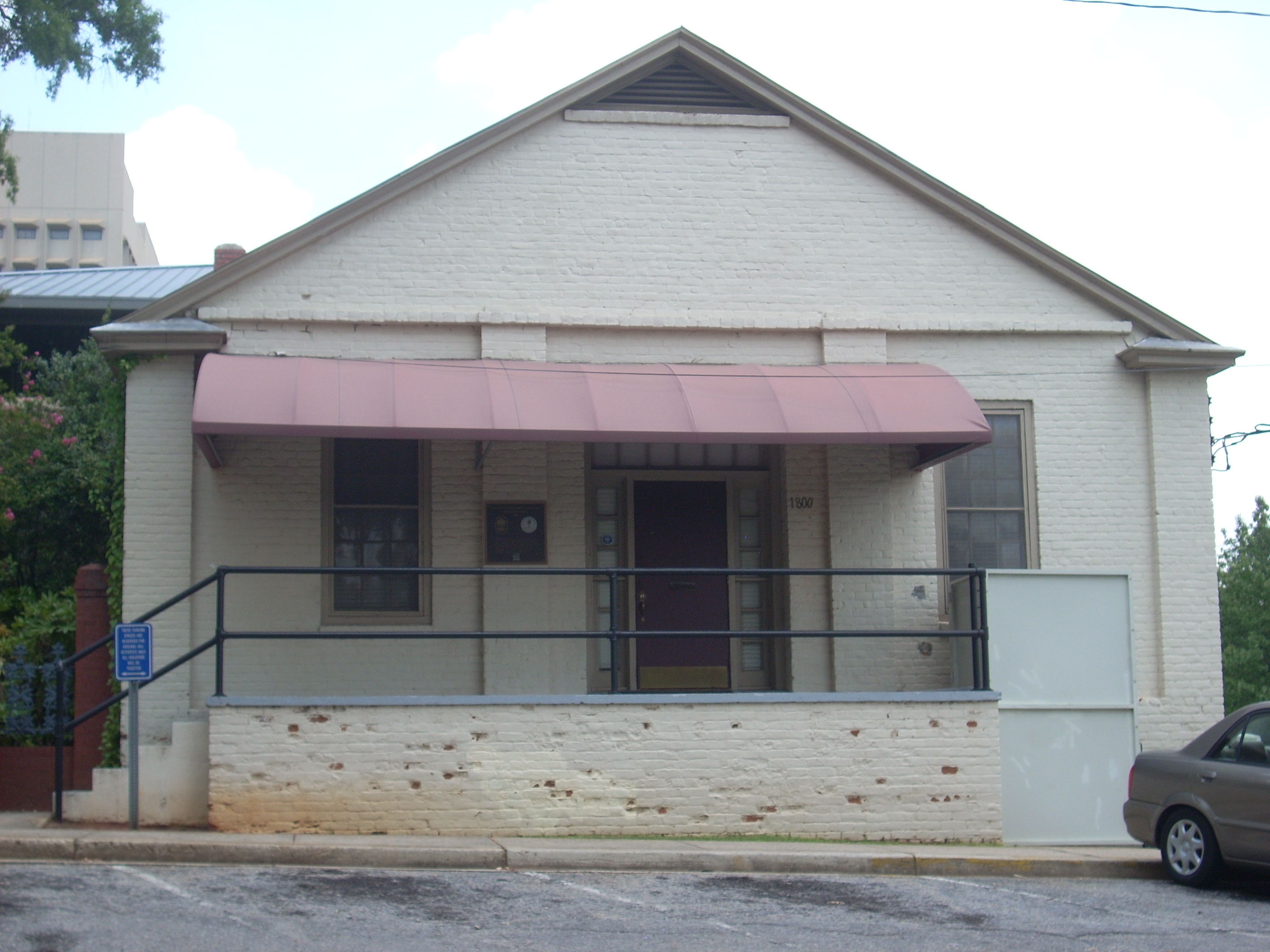
- Palmetto Iron Works and Armory

- Location within South Carolina Location within the United States
- Location: 1800 Lincoln St., Columbia, South Carolina
- Coordinates: 34°0′29″N 81°2′32″W
- Built: 1850
- Architect: William Glaze
- NRHP reference No.: 71000795
- Added to NRHP: November 23, 1971

Arsenal Hill is a neighborhood in Columbia, South Carolina. Arsenal Hill was one of the first residential neighborhoods in the city and was the site of an arsenal during the Civil War.
