= HMS Actaeon =

Six ships and a shore establishment of the Royal Navy have borne the name HMS Actaeon or HMS Acteon, after Actaeon, a figure in Greek mythology:

- HMS Actaeon (1757) was a 28-gun sixth-rate frigate launched in 1757 and sold as unserviceable in 1766.
- HMS Actaeon (1775) was a 28-gun sixth-rate frigate launched in 1775 and grounded and burnt in 1776.
- HMS Actaeon (1778) was a 44-gun fifth-rate two-decker launched in 1778, on harbour service from 1795 and sold in 1802.
- HMS Acteon (1805) was the 16-gun French brig Actêon that HMS Egyptienne captured in 1805 off Rochefort; Acteon was broken up in 1816.
- HMS Actaeon (1831) was a 26-gun sixth rate launched in 1831. She was converted to a survey ship in 1856, lent to the Cork Harbour Board in 1870 as a hulk, and sold in 1889. The Acteon Group in French Polynesia was named for the ship.
- HMS Actaeon was a hulk, originally the 50-gun fourth rate HMS Vernon that formed part of the Navy's torpedo school, HMS Vernon. She was renamed HMS Actaeon in 1886 and was sold in 1923.
- HMS Actaeon (U07) was a modified Black Swan-class sloop launched in 1945 and sold to West Germany in 1959 as Hipper. She was hulked in 1964 and sold for breaking up in 1967.
- HMS Actaeon (shore establishment) was a shore establishment, originally part of HMS Vernon. It was established as a separate command in 1905 and paid off in 1922.
  - HMS Ariadne (1859) was the original HMS Actaeon, renamed and commissioned in 1905 and sold in 1922.
  - HMS Dido (1869) was HMS Actaeon II between 1906 and 1922.
