= Naval Museum of Halifax =

Coordinates: 44°39′34.5″N 63°35′33.5″W

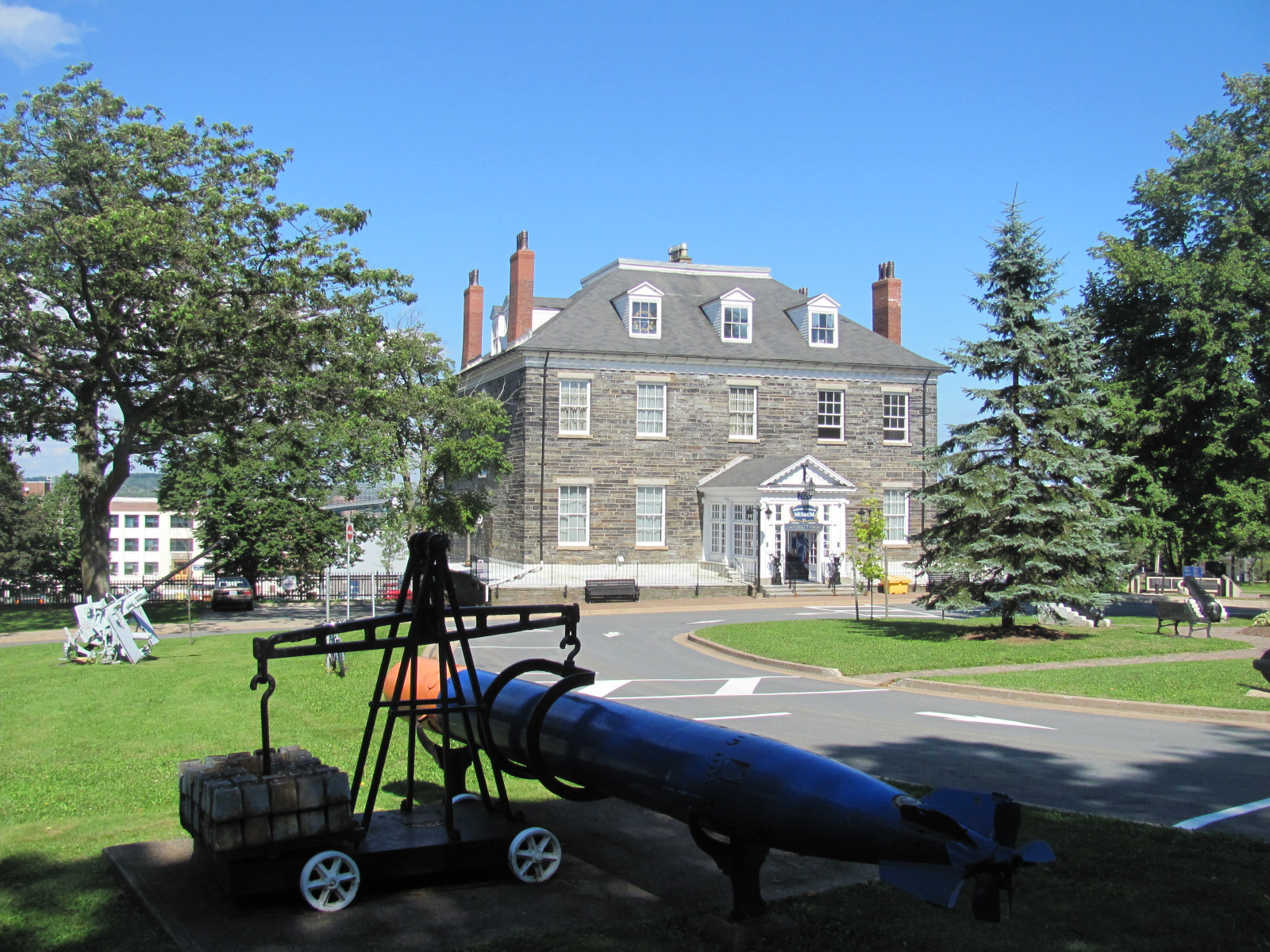
- Established: 1974
- Location: 2725 Gottingen Street, Halifax, Nova Scotia, Canada
- Type: Naval museum
- Website: www.canada.ca/en/services/defence/caf/militaryhistory/militarymuseums/museums/military-museums-directory/naval-museum-halifax.html

National Historic Site of Canada
- Official name: Admiralty House National Historic Site of Canada
- Designated: 1978

The Naval Museum of Halifax (formerly the Maritime Command Museum) is a Canadian Forces museum located at CFB Halifax in the former official residence of the Commander-in-Chief of the North America Station (1819–1905). Also known as Admiralty House, the residence is a National Historic Site of Canada located in Halifax, Nova Scotia, Canada. The museum collects, preserves and displays the artifacts and history of the Royal Canadian Navy.

== Admiralty House ==
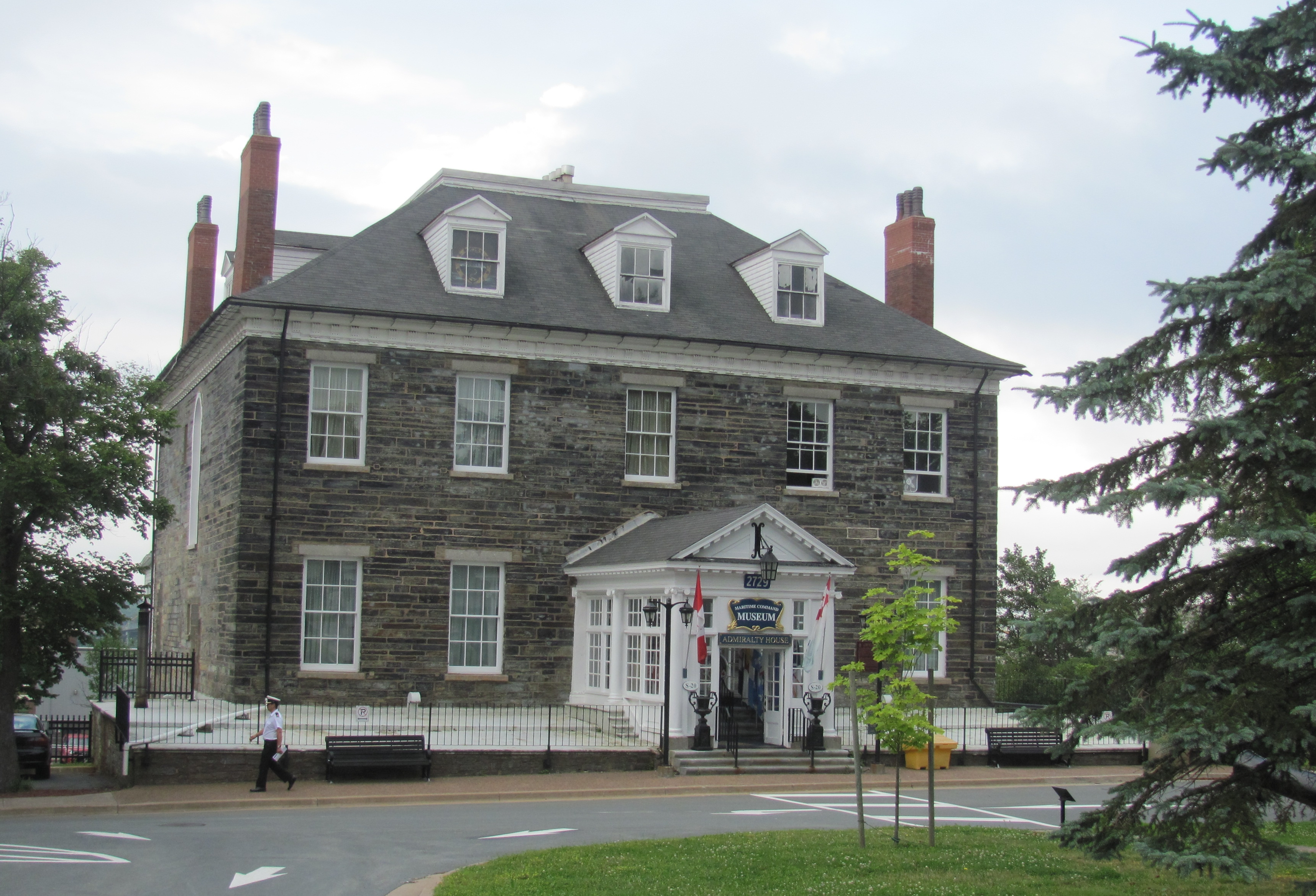
Admiralty House Halifax

Admiralty House served as the official summer residence of the admiral commanding the North American Station of the British Royal Navy from 1819 to 1905. Construction of the large Palladian Style Georgian house overlooking the Halifax Naval Yard began in 1814. Squadron commanders previously resided aboard a flagship moored at the Naval Yard. The house was completed in 1819 as the summer residence of the Commander-in-Chief of the North American Station, with the squadron shifting its main base during the winter months from Halifax to the Royal Naval Dockyard in Bermuda (where a separate Admiralty House was maintained from 1795 to 1956). The first to live in the residence was Admiral David Milne.

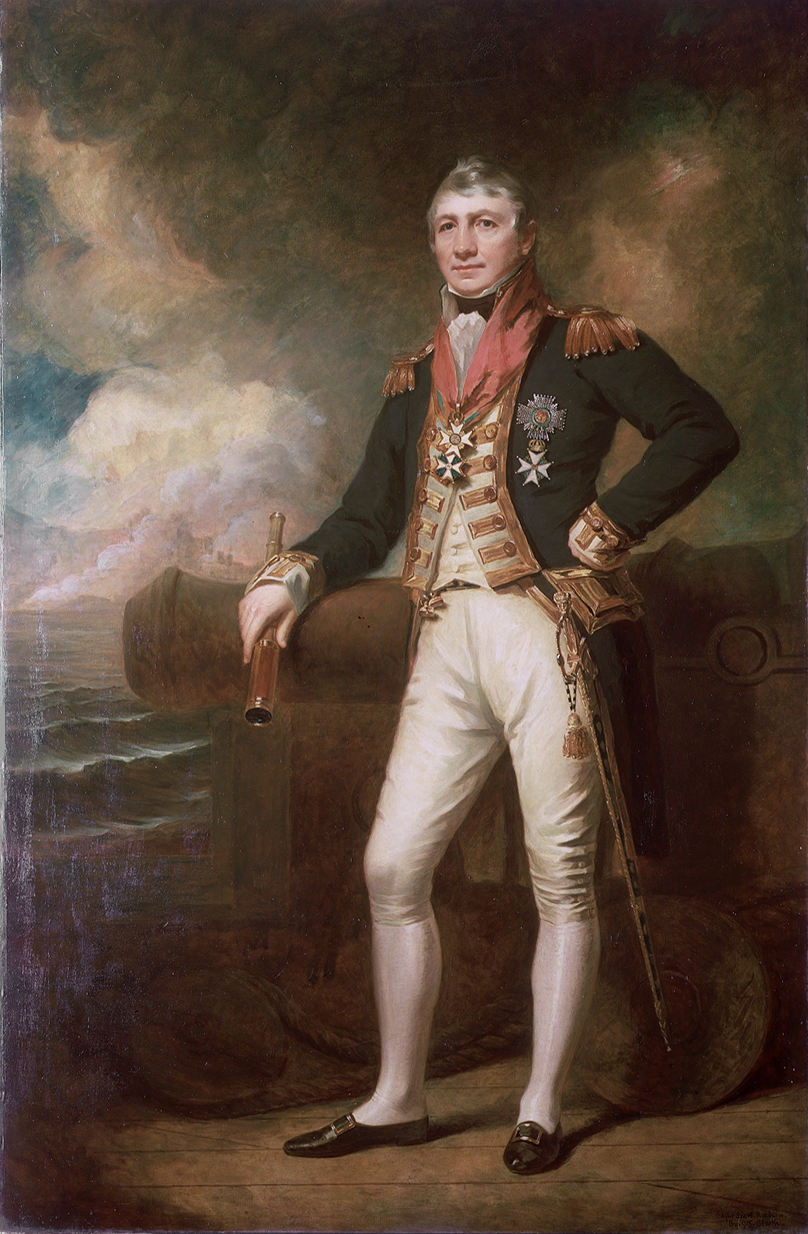
David Milne, 1st Admiral in residence

As the residence of one of the most important officials in Halifax, Admiralty House hosted many social and ceremonial events in the 19th century. One of the largest was a ball in 1848 for 600 guests hosted by Admiral Thomas Cochrane, Earl of Dundonald, famous as the inspiration for the fictional characters Horatio Hornblower by C. S. Forester and Jack Aubrey by Patrick O'Brian. Another famous resident of the house was Admiral Francis Austen, brother of the famous novelist Jane Austen. In all, 36 admirals lived in the house, the last being Sir Day Hort Bosanquet.

Admiralty House was taken over by the Canadian government in 1905 as Canada took responsibility for the Halifax Dockyard from the British Royal Navy. In World War I it served as a naval hospital. The roof was blown in by the Halifax Explosion on December 6, 1917. Despite the damage, hospital staff, many of them injured themselves, treated many wounded in the house in the hours after the explosion. After repairs, the house was used as a clinic by the Massachusetts Halifax Relief Commission to assist survivors after the explosion. From 1925 to 1954 it became part of the Royal Canadian Navy base HMCS Stadacona, serving as a Wardroom Officer's Mess and later as office space. In 1961 it became the library for the Royal Canadian Navy and provided classroom space.

== Notable Admirals in Residence (1819–1905) ==
=== War of 1812 ===
Two Admirals distinguished themselves during the War of 1812:

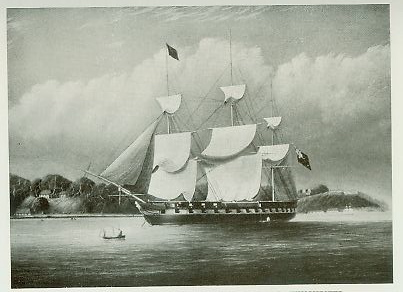
Edward Colpoys's flagship, HMS Winchester, re-established New Ireland (Maine) (1814); served at Halifax (1816–1821, 1830–1832)

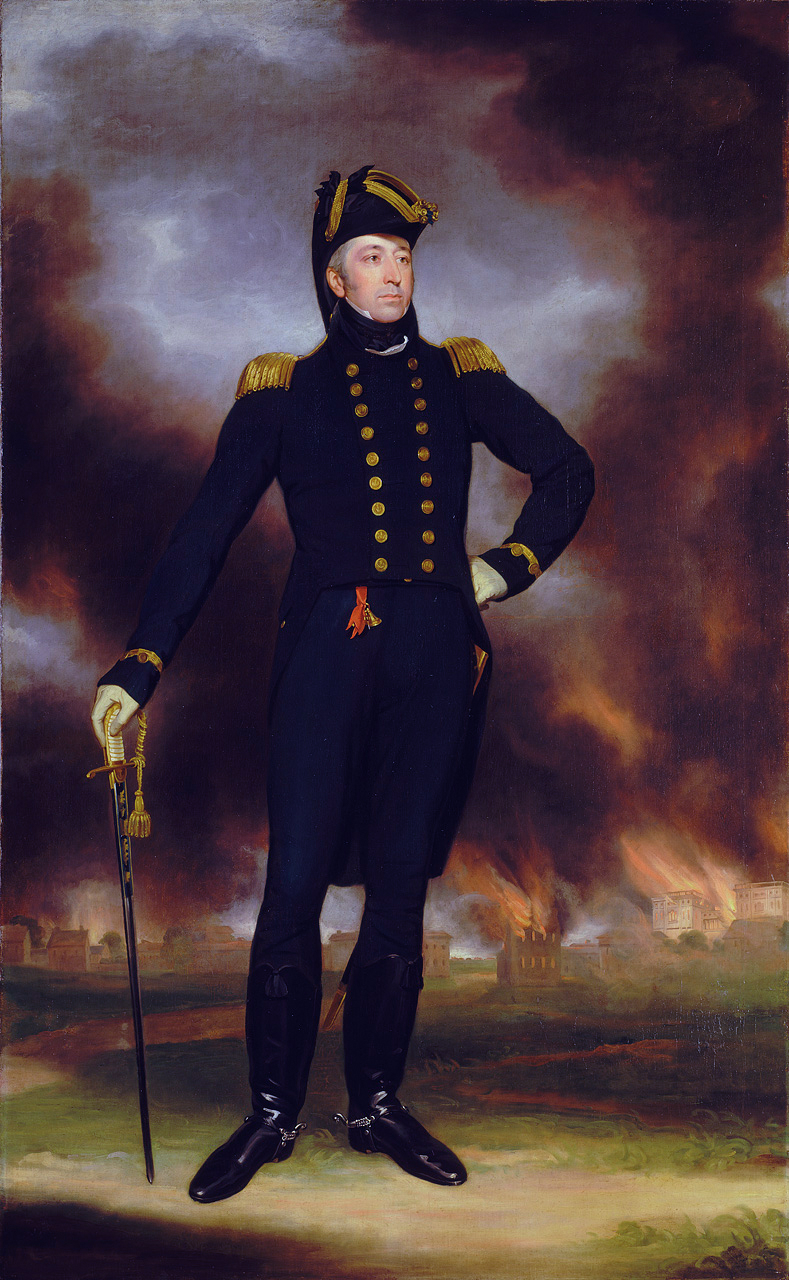
Sir George Cockburn, 10th Baronet, Burning of Washington (1814); served at Halifax (1832–36)

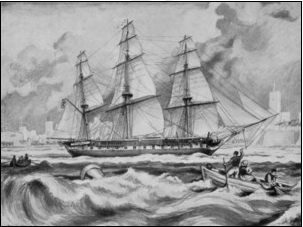
Cockburn's flagship HMS Vernon in Halifax

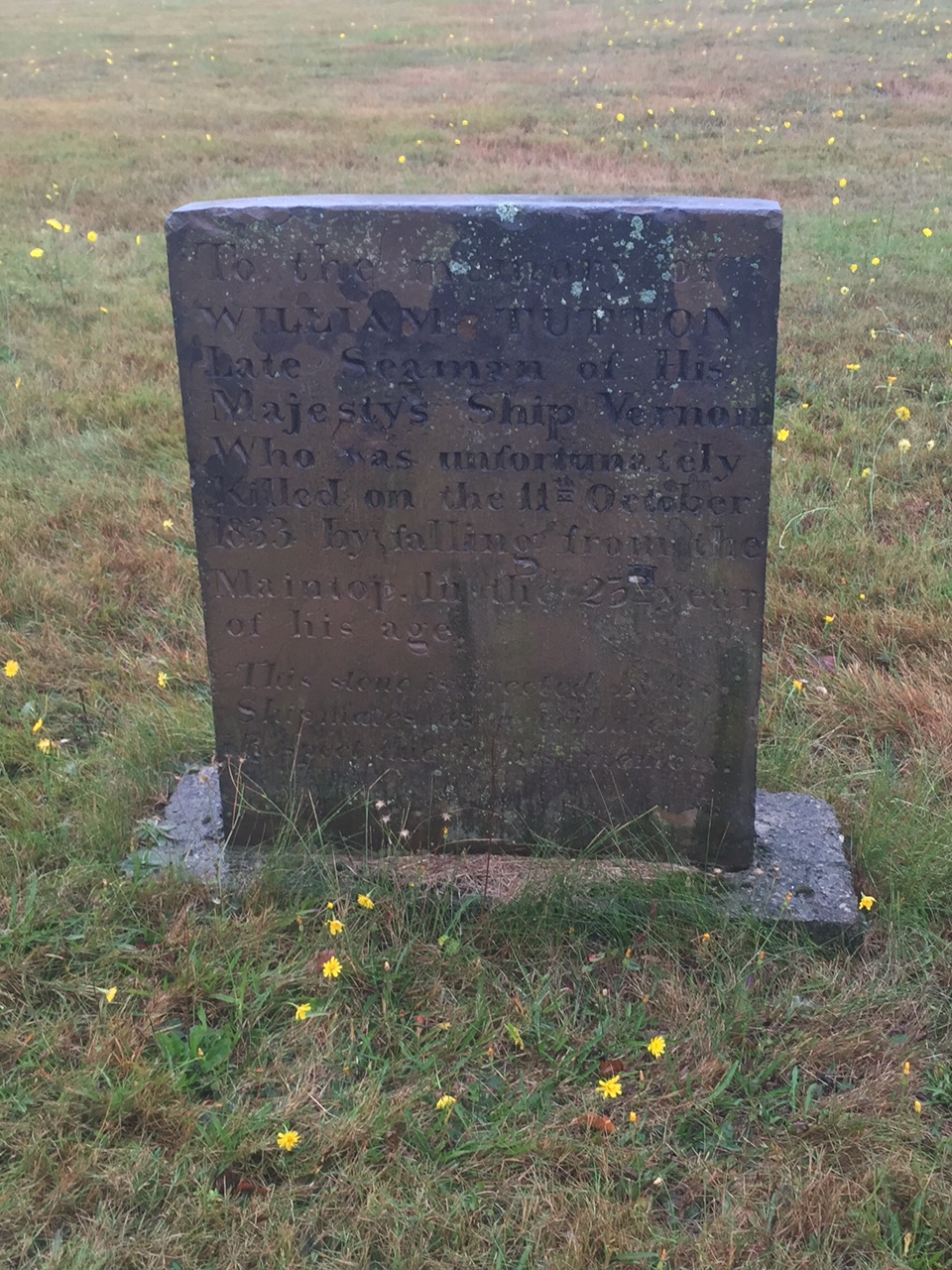
HMS Vernon, Royal Navy Burial Ground

=== Siege of Sevastopol ===
Four of the Admirals fought in the renowned Siege of Sevastopol (1854–55) during the Crimean War:

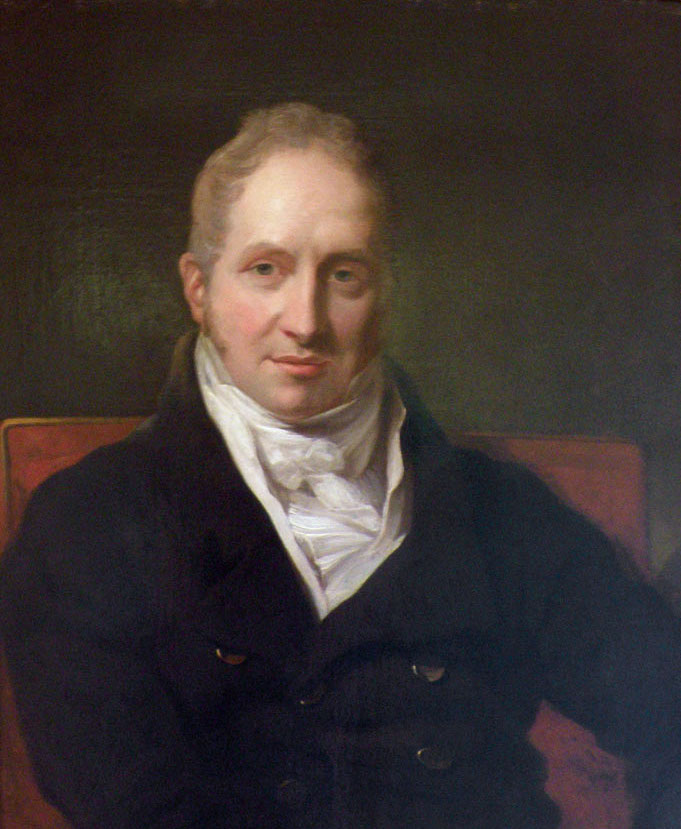
Houston Stewart, served at Halifax (1856–60)

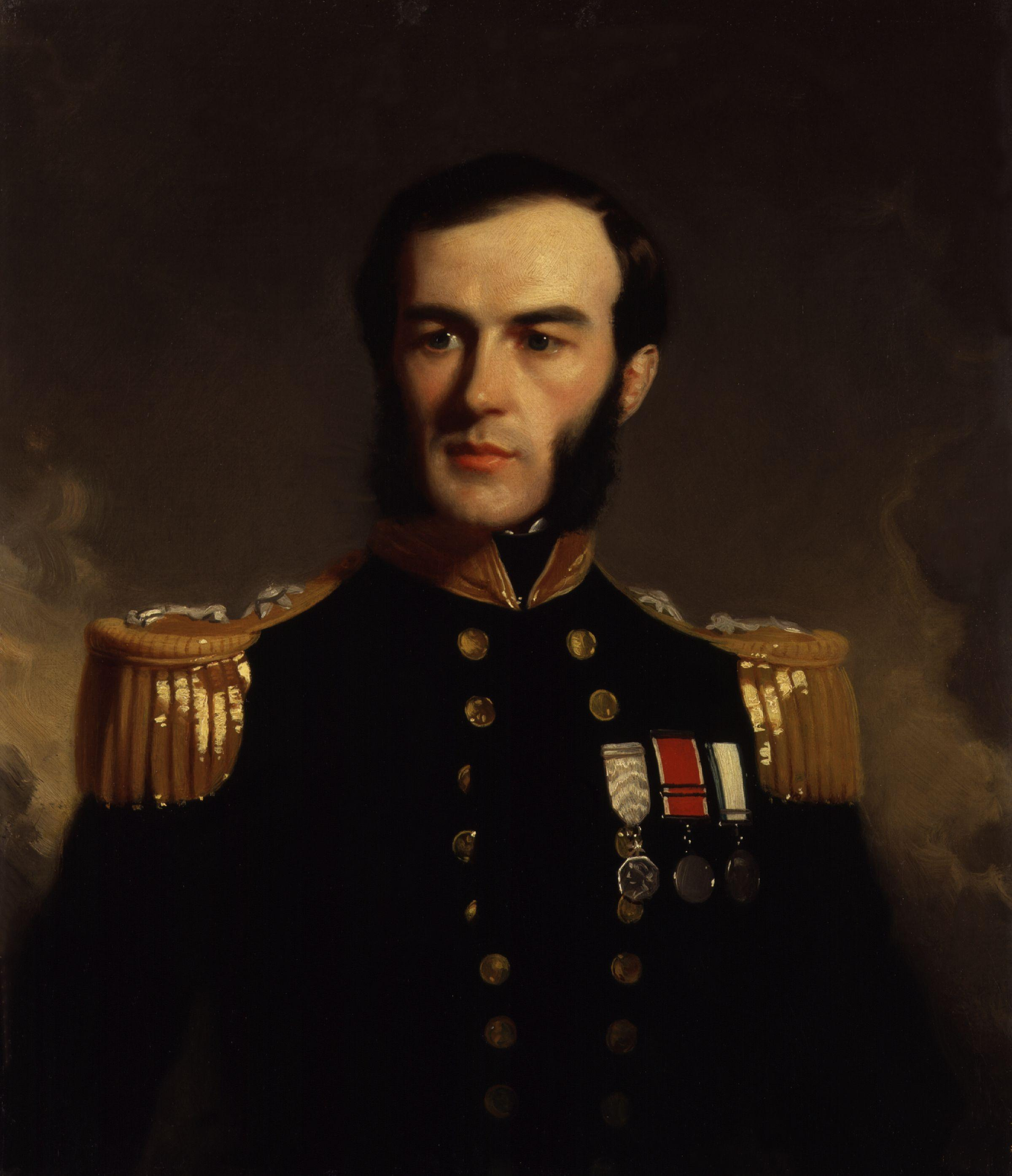
Edward Augustus Inglefield, served in Halifax (1878–79)

John Edmund Commerell, Commerell was awarded the Victoria Cross for the Siege; served at Halifax (1882–85)

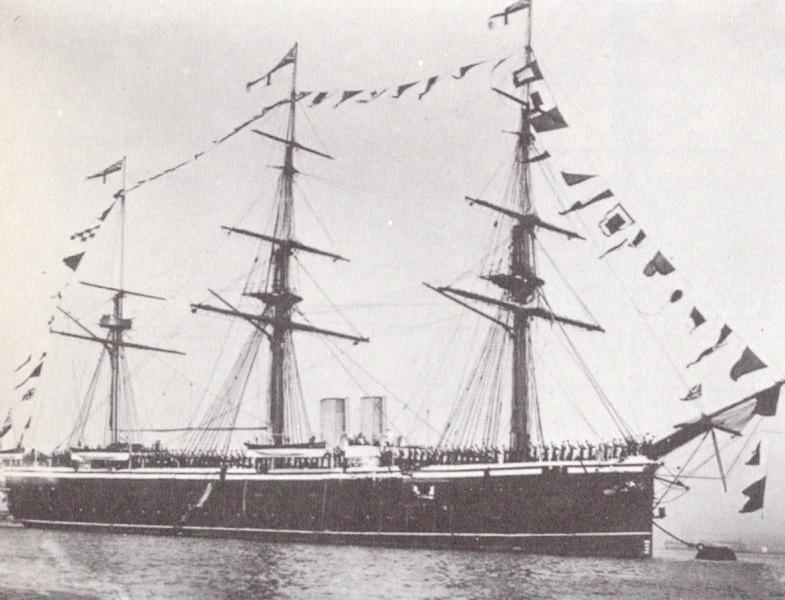
Commerell's flagship HMS Northampton

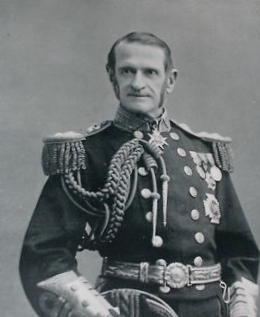
Algernon Lyons, served at Halifax (1886–88)

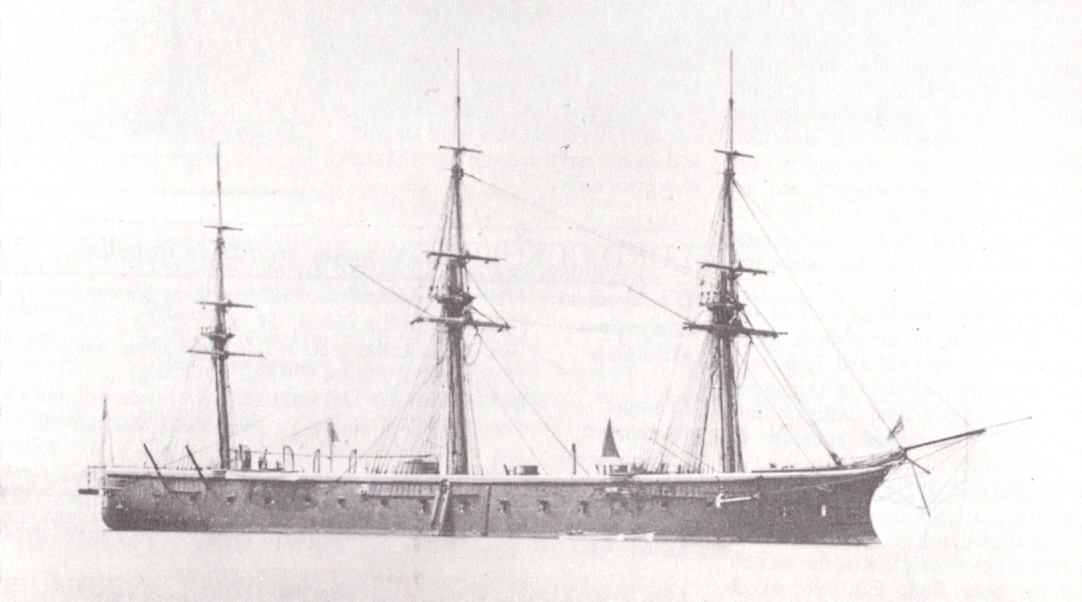
Lyons' flagship HMS Bellerophon in Halifax

=== Franklin's Lost Expedition ===
Two Admirals were involved in the search for Franklin's Lost Expedition:

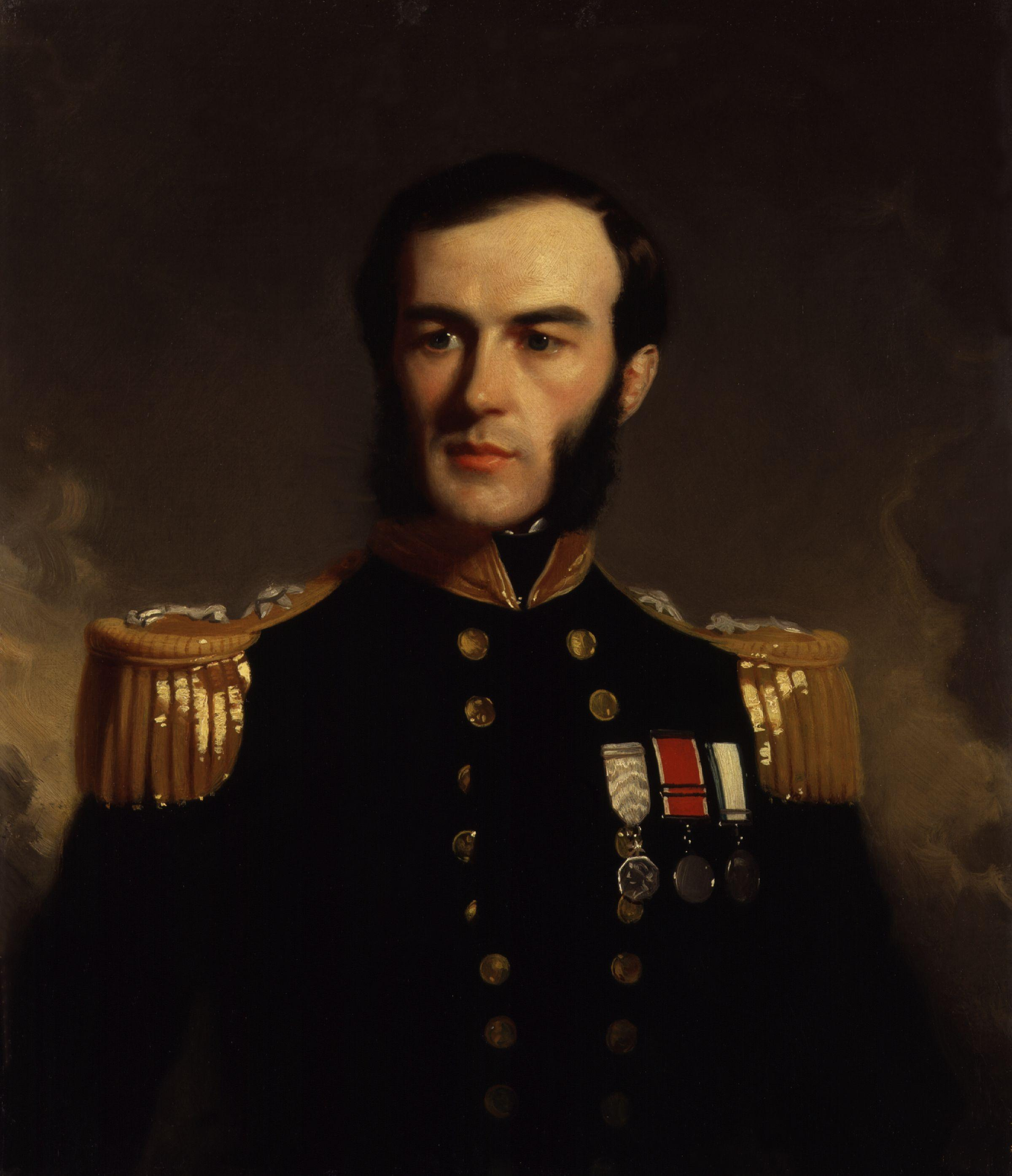
Edward Augustus Inglefield, served in Halifax (1878–79)

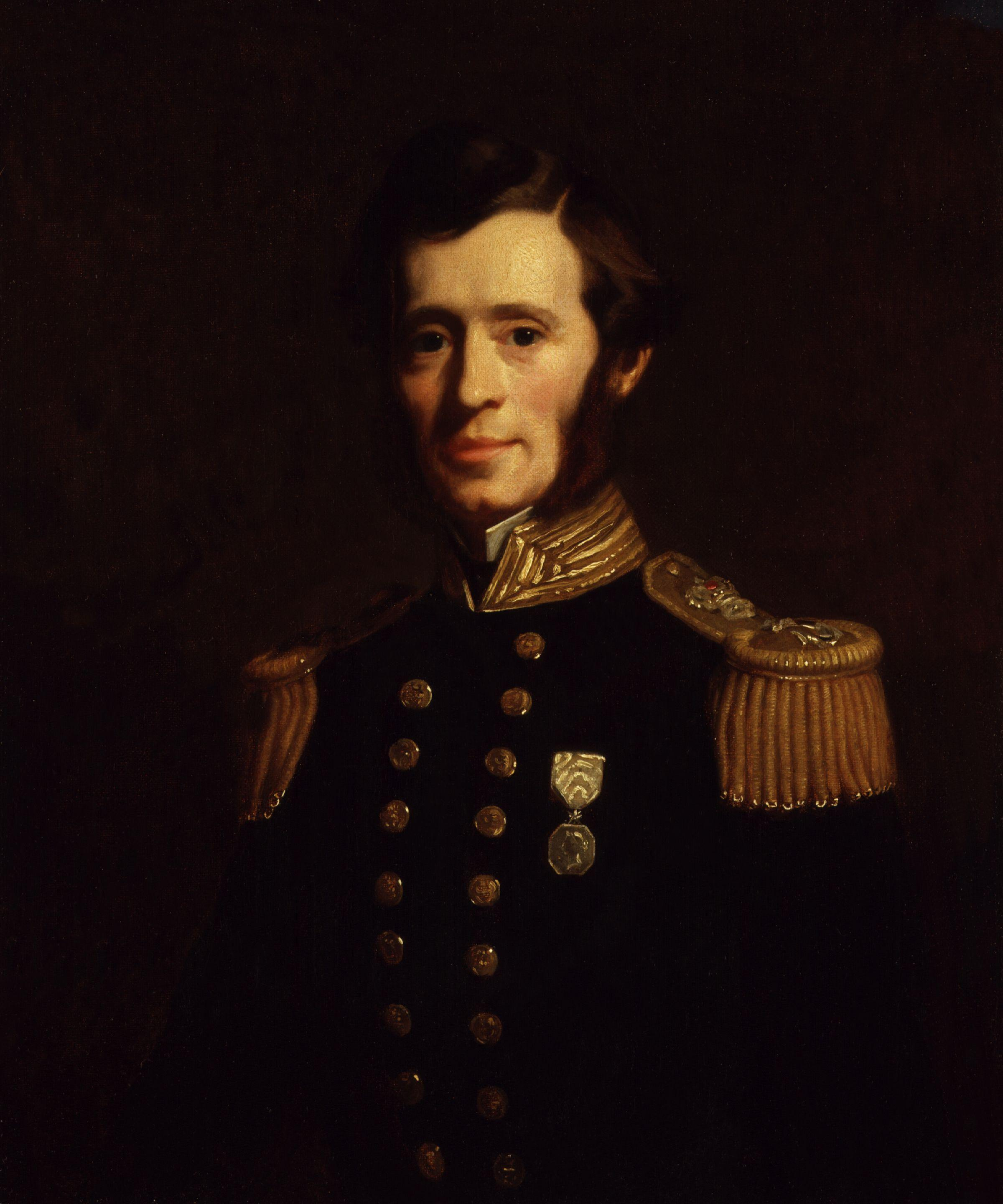
Francis McClintock, served in Halifax (1879–82)

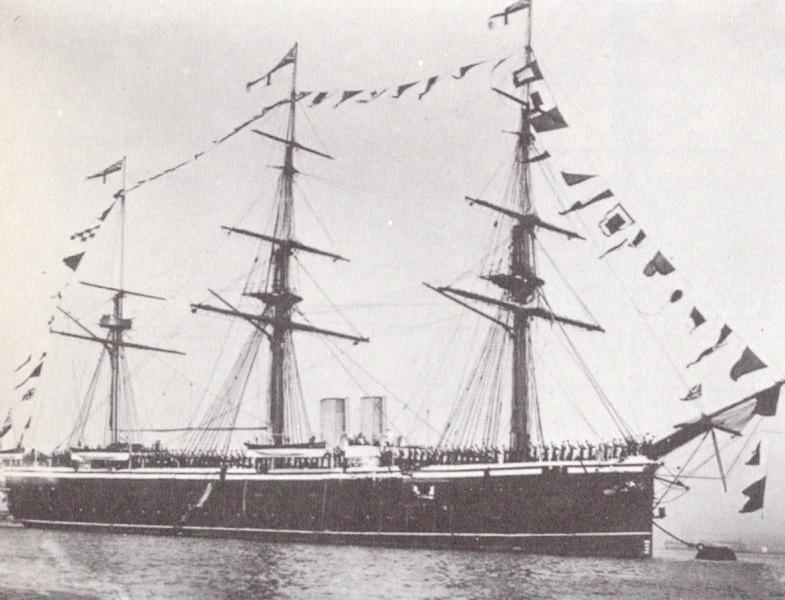
McClintock's flagship HMS Northampton in Halifax

=== Other ===
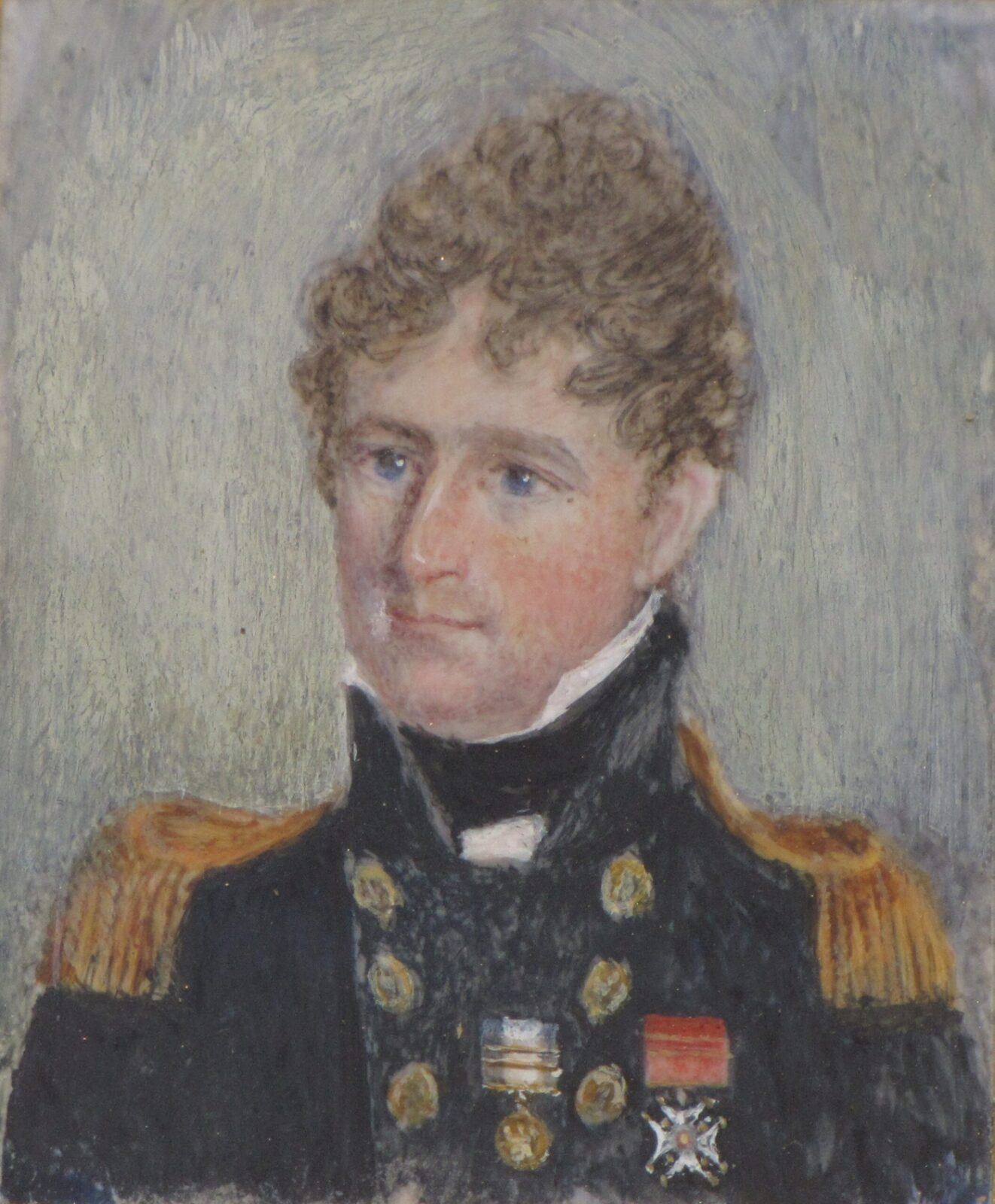
Francis Austen, brother of Jane Austen; served in Halifax (1844-1848)

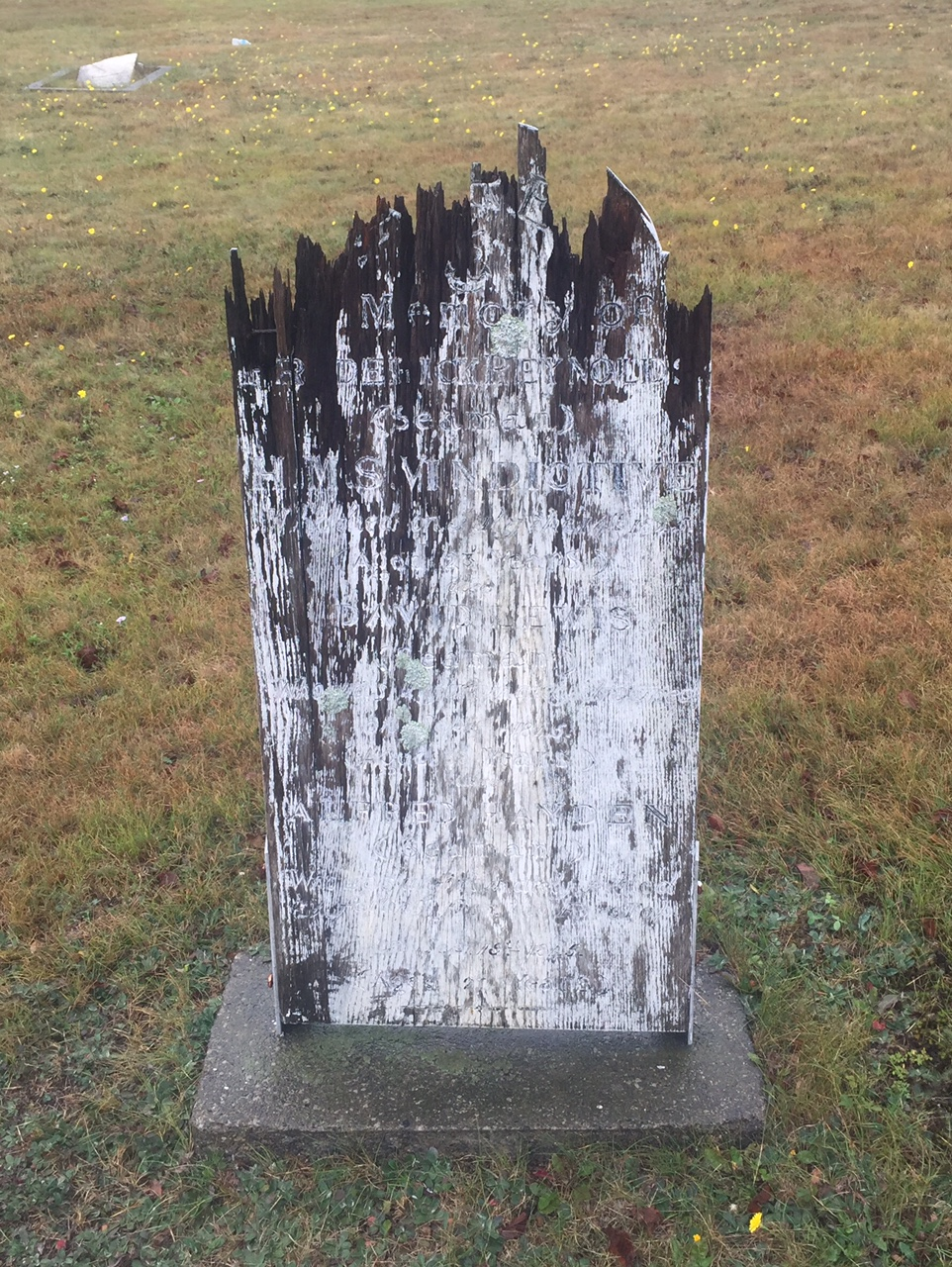
Austen's marker to commemorate the four that died on his flagship, HMS Vindictive – Royal Navy Burying Ground (Halifax, Nova Scotia) (1846) (Note: Two stones; four crew (1845, 1846))

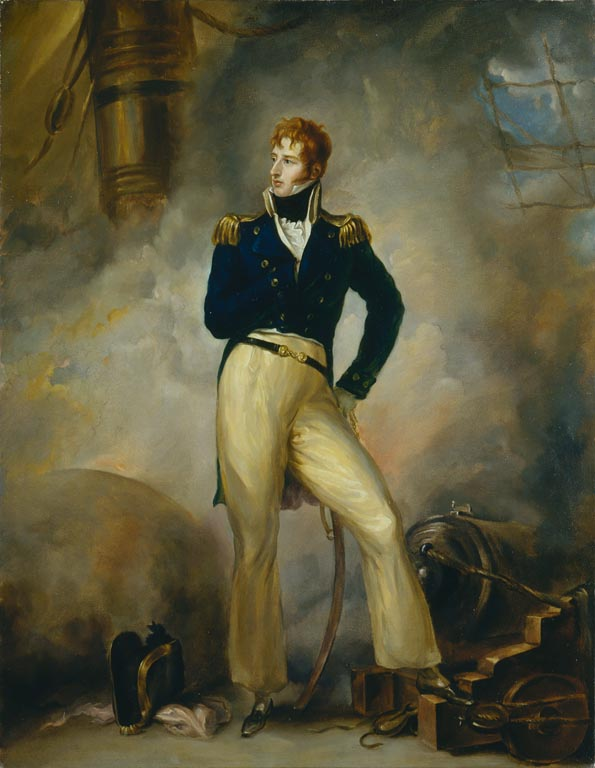
The 10th Earl of Dundonald, inspiration for Patrick O'Brian's protagonist Jack Aubrey; served in Halifax (1848–51)

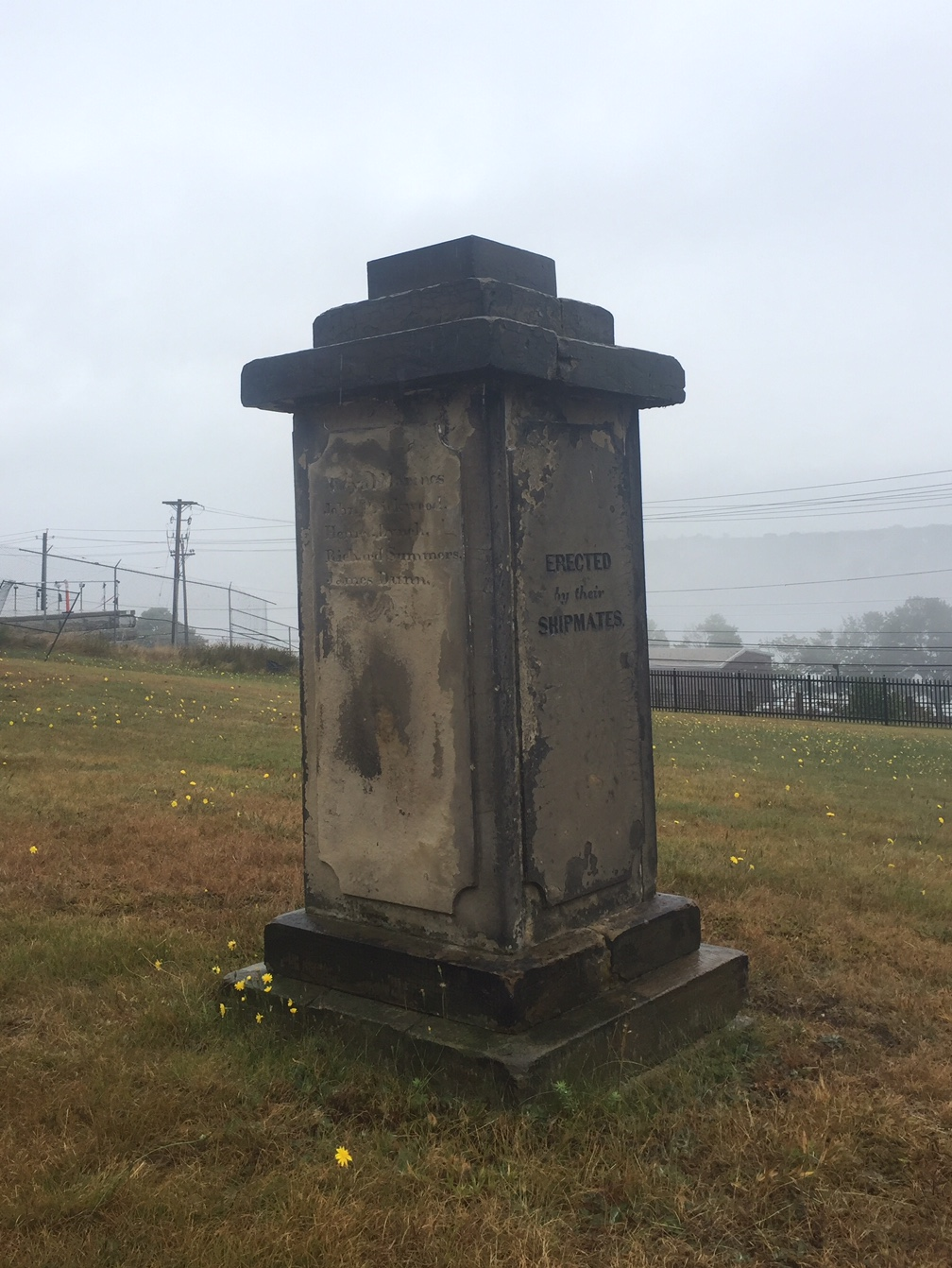
Cochrane's marker to commemorate the 11 that died on his flagship HMS Wellesley, Royal Navy Burying Ground (Halifax, Nova Scotia), (1850)

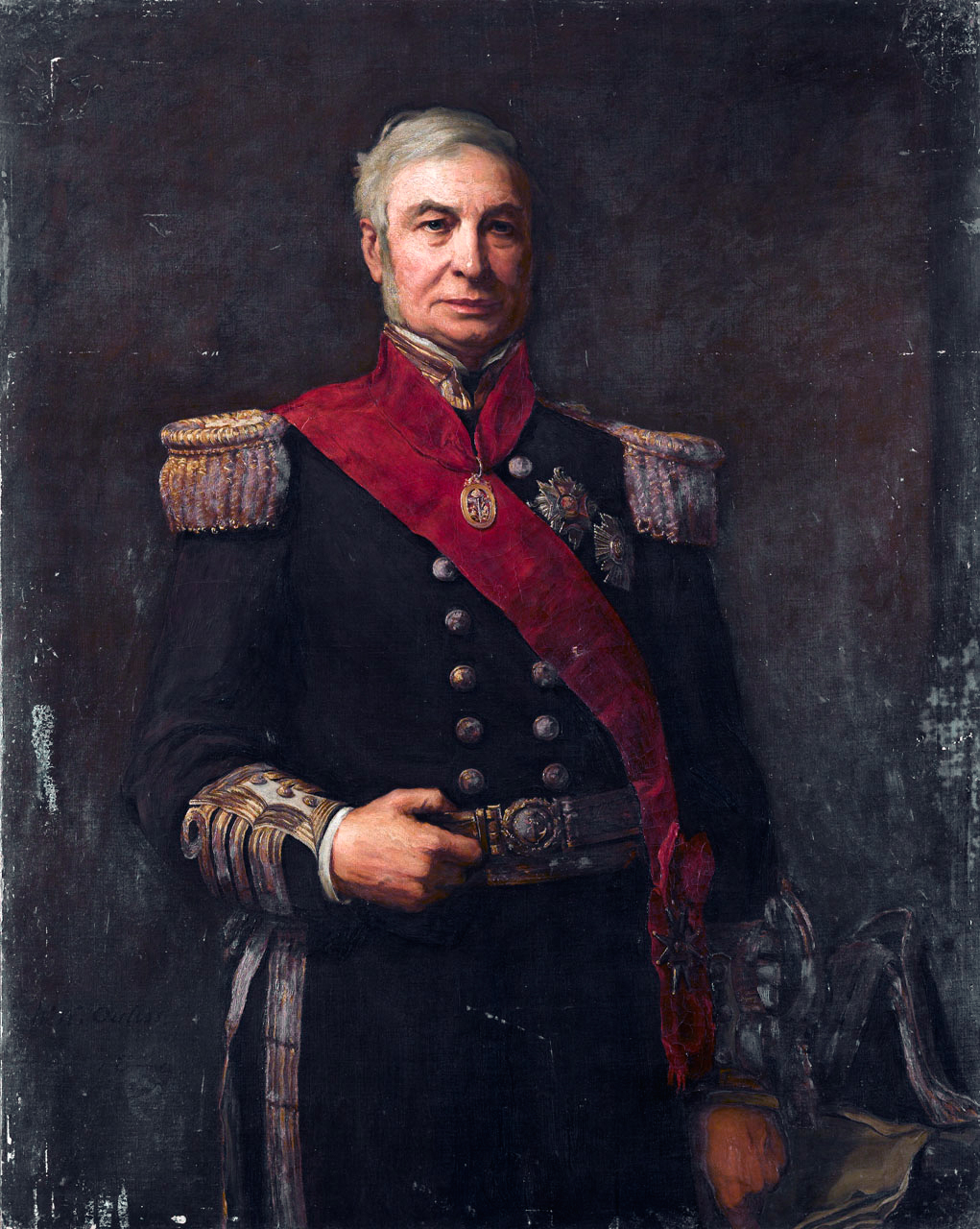
Alexander Milne, Trent Affair, American Civil War; served at Halifax (1860–64)

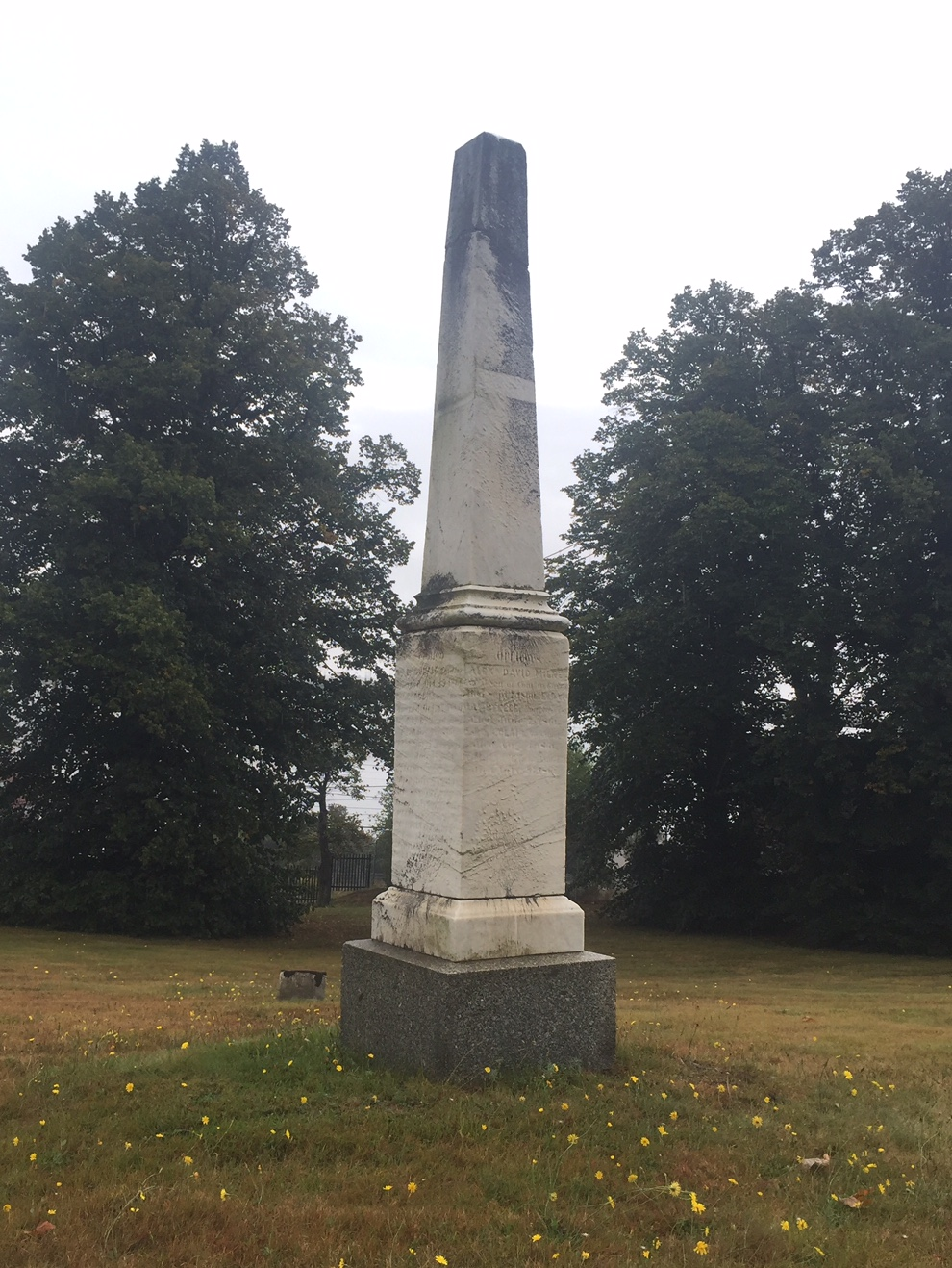
Milne's marker to commemorate the 16 that died on his flagship HMS Nile Monument, Royal Navy Burying Ground (Halifax, Nova Scotia), (1861)
- James Hope (Royal Navy officer)
- Sir George Wellesley (1869–70) (1873–75)

== Museum ==
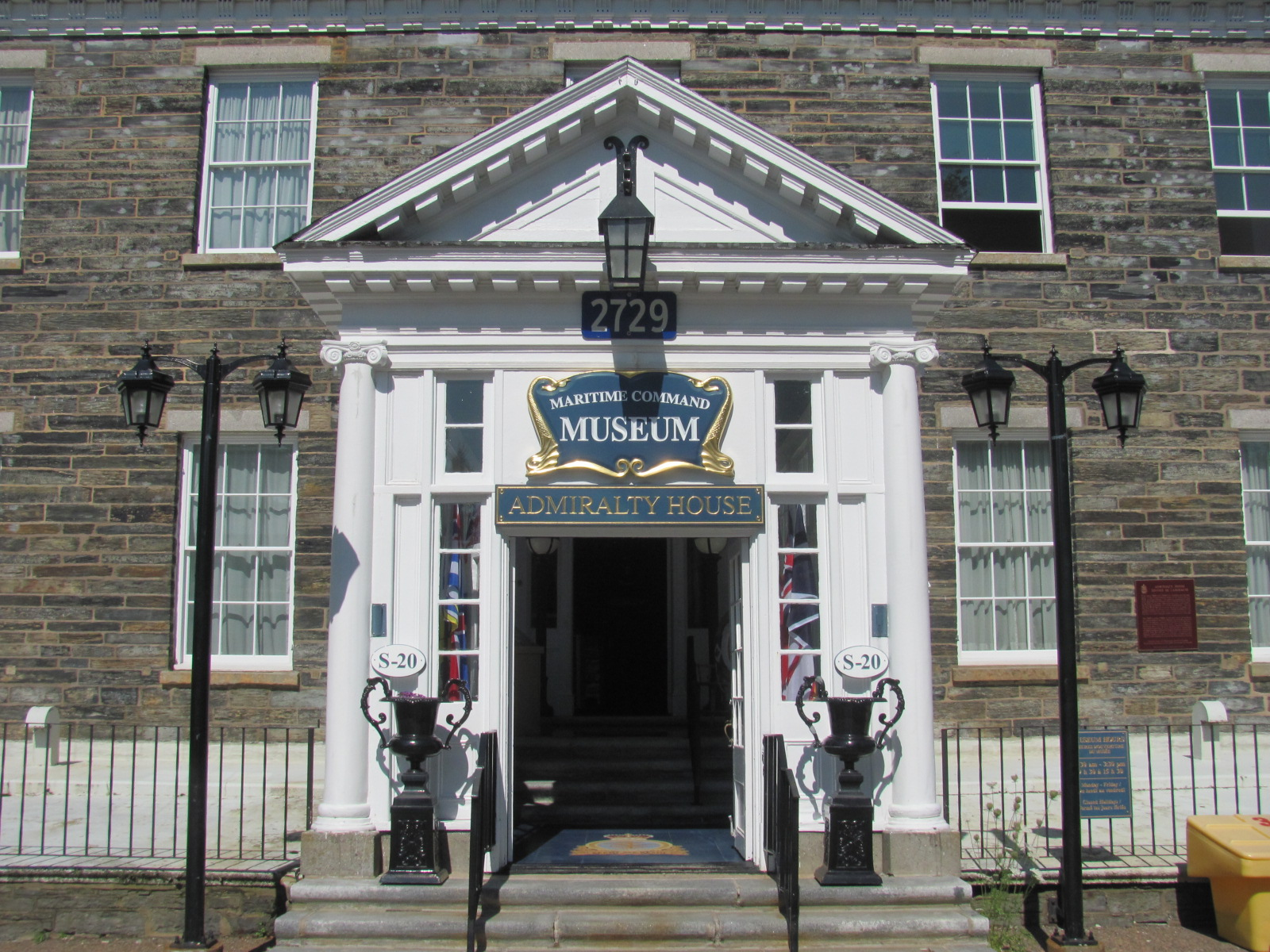
Entrance to the museum

Admiralty House was officially opened as a museum on March 26, 1974, by Rear Admiral D. S. Boyle. The house was declared a National Historic Site in 1978. The museum underwent extensive renovations in 2009–2010.

The focus is on the history of the Canadian Navy from 1910 to the present, along with the earlier history of the Halifax Dockyard. Highlights include the original bell and a large display of artifacts from HMCS Niobe, the first flagship of the Royal Canadian Navy, and a display of ship's bells and christening bells spanning the history of the Canadian Navy. More than 30 rooms of exhibits are open to the public as well as grounds which display weapons and equipment from the Canadian Navy. The collection consists of uniforms, model ships, medals, badges, ships' bells, armaments, and other equipment of naval life.

The museum also maintains a research library, archives and large photograph collection.

=== Artifacts ===
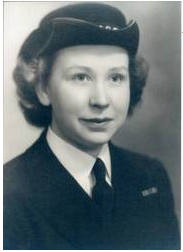
Order of Canada medal of Laverna Katie Dollimore for the Iran Hostage Crisis (1979)

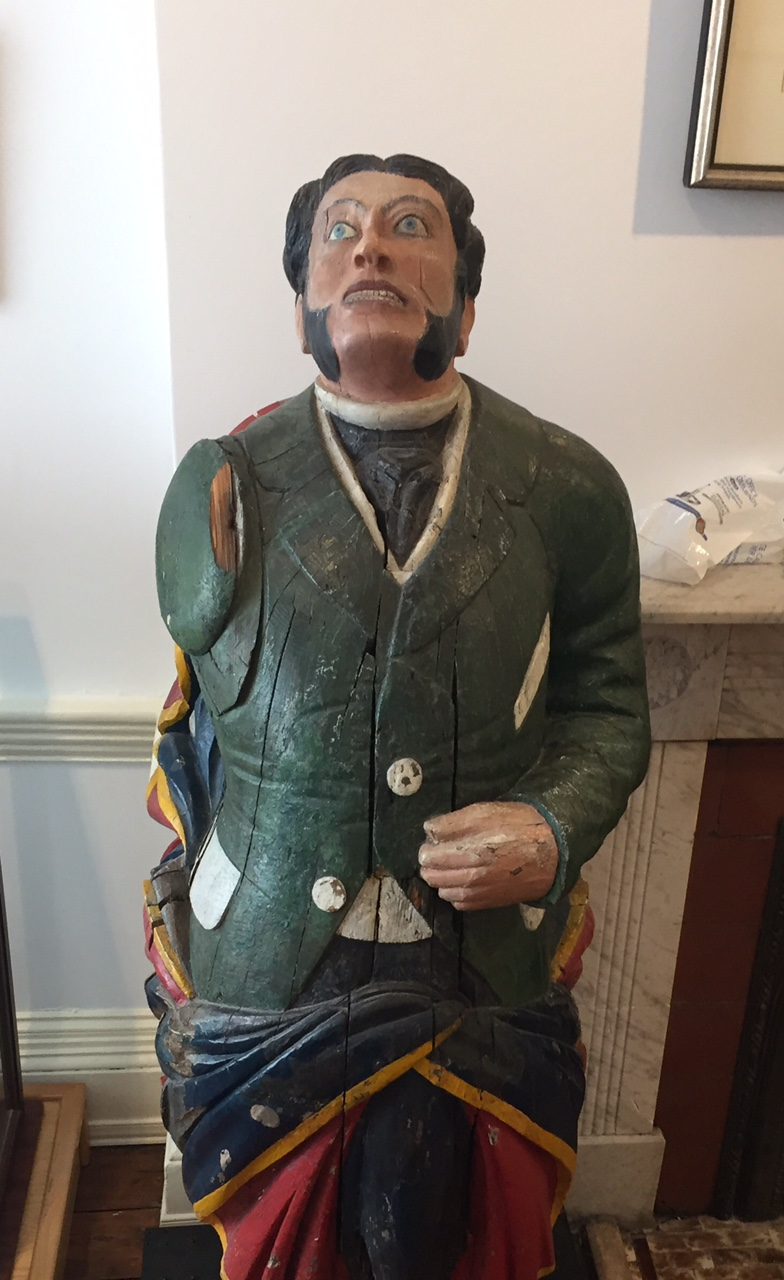
Reported to be HMS Namur figurehead

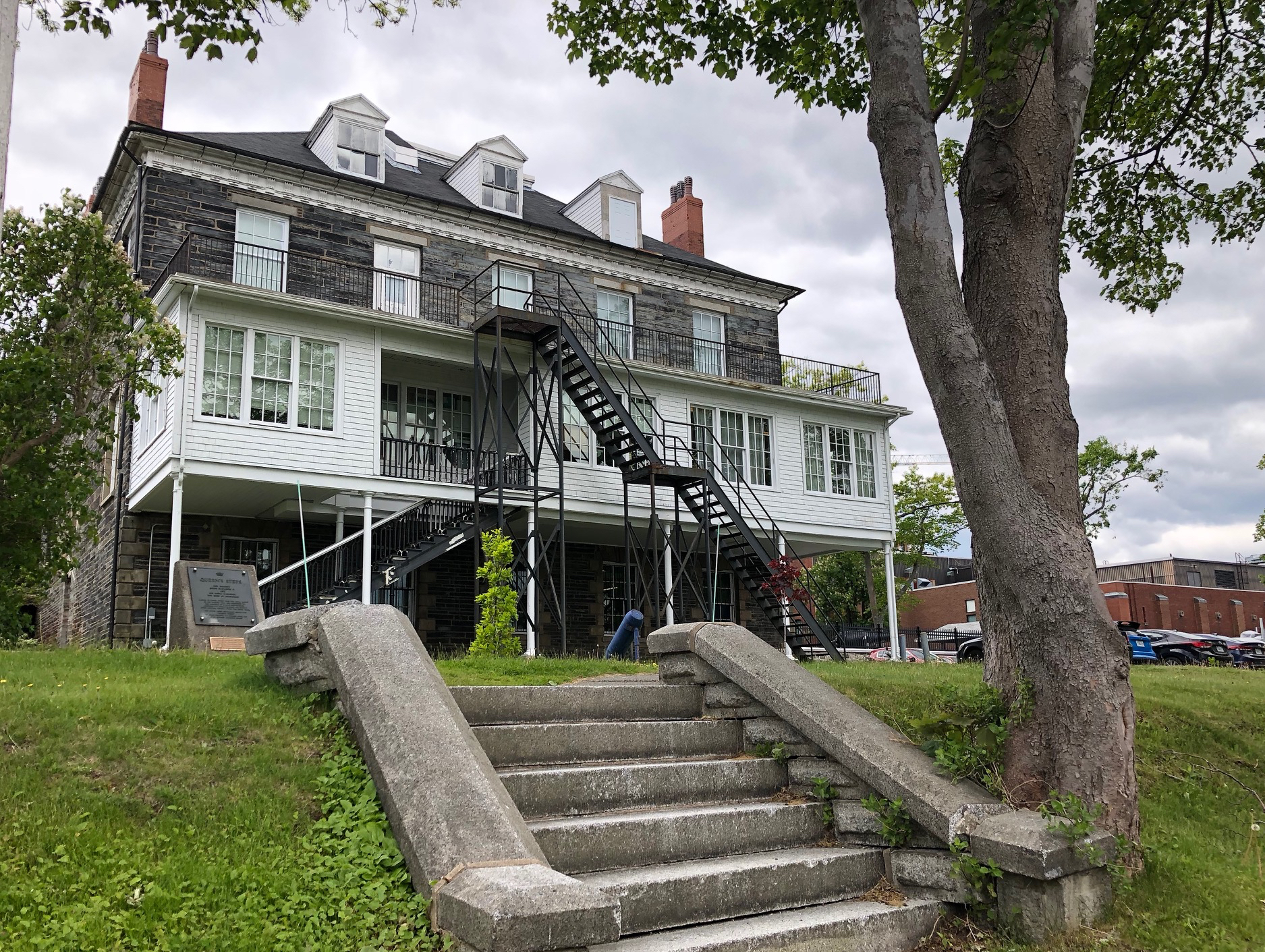
This staircase is one of the few remaining landscape elements of Admiralty House's original grounds. Often confused with the "Queens Steps", this staircase can be traced through photographs in the museum's archive back to the late 1800s.

== Royal Navy Burying Ground ==
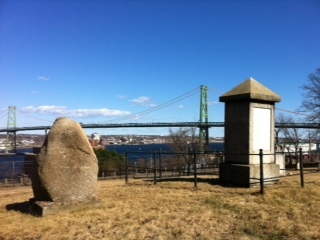
Royal Navy Burial Ground – Gravestones for USS Chesapeake (left) and HMS Shannon (right)

The Royal Navy Burying Ground at Halifax has monuments to those served and lost in the medical facility as a result of the capture of USS Chesapeake by HMS Shannon. There are 84 grave markers, but as many as 500 people buried there. There was a tradition where the Commander and Chief of the North America and West Indies Station who lived in Admiralty House created a grave marker for their crew who died while at the station.

== Admiralty Garden ==
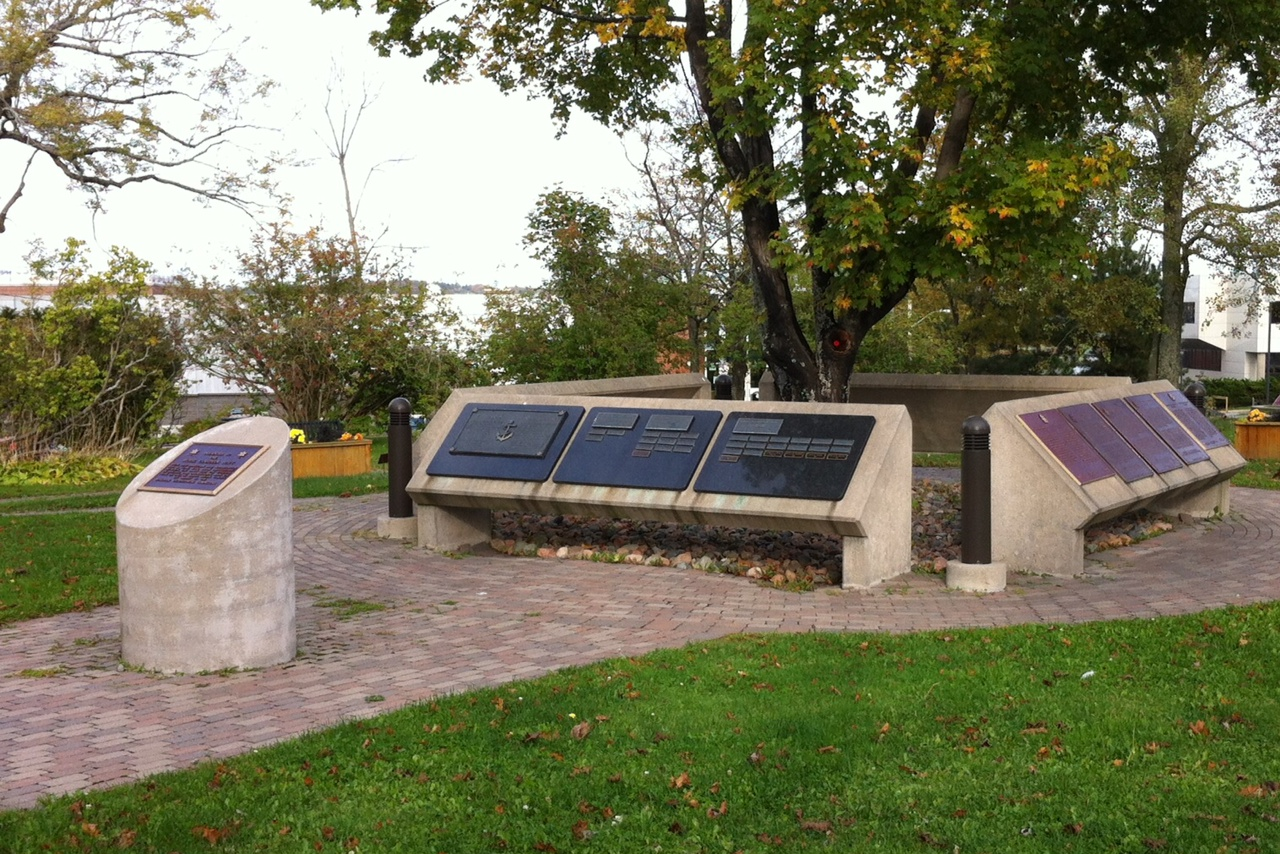
Admiralty Garden CFB Halifax

On the grounds of the Admiralty House is the Admiralty Garden which was created c. 1814 and has plaques and monuments displayed to honour Admirals and other military personnel. In 1972 the "Wall of Valour" was created to recognize the bravery decorations awarded to members of the Canadian Navy and the Naval Reserves. Those that are listen received: Cross of Valour (Canada); Star of Courage (Canada); and the Medal of Bravery (Canada). There are also plaques of Historic Sites and Monuments Board of Canada to commemorate the following Admirals:

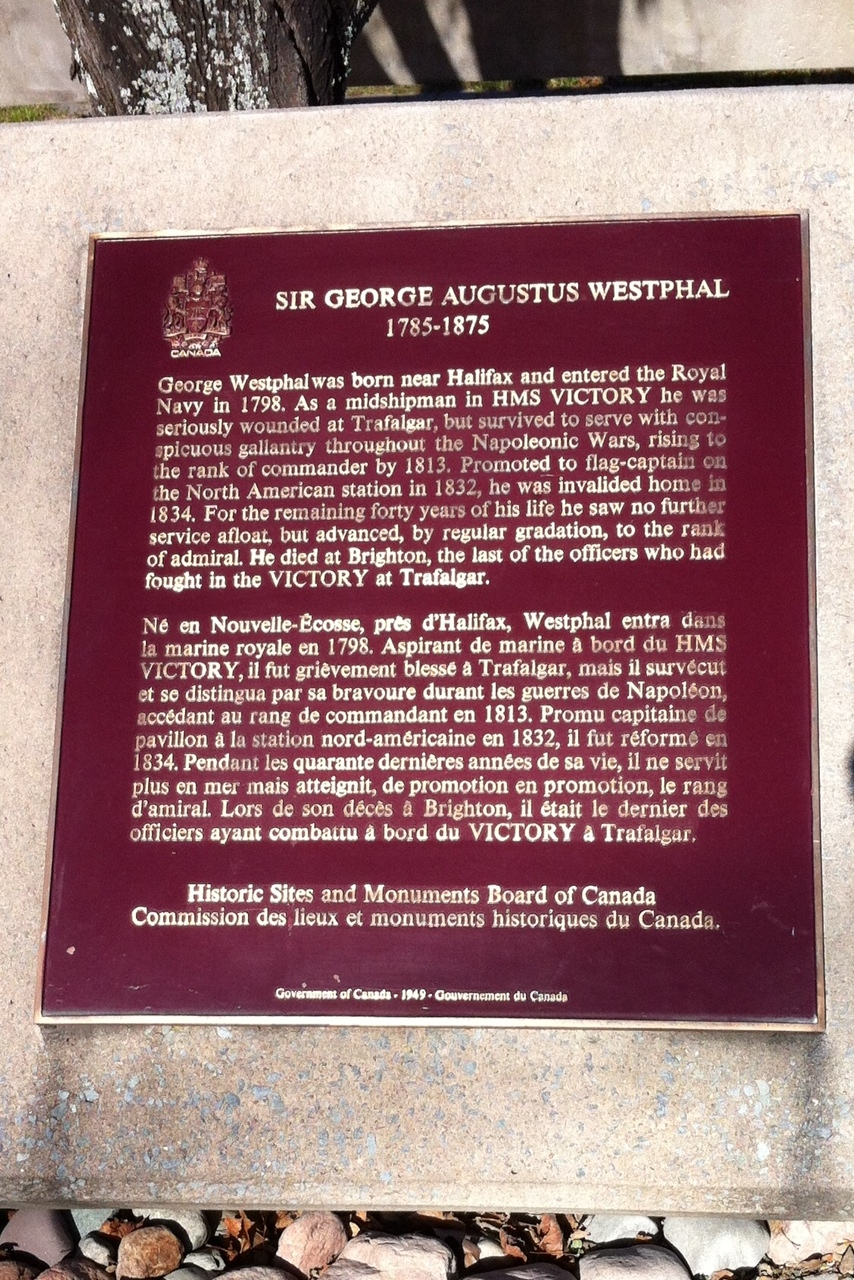
George Augustus Westphal - Battle of Trafalgar

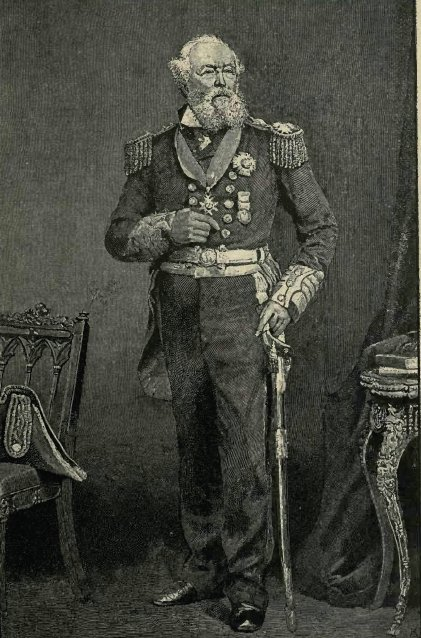
Provo Wallis - War of 1812

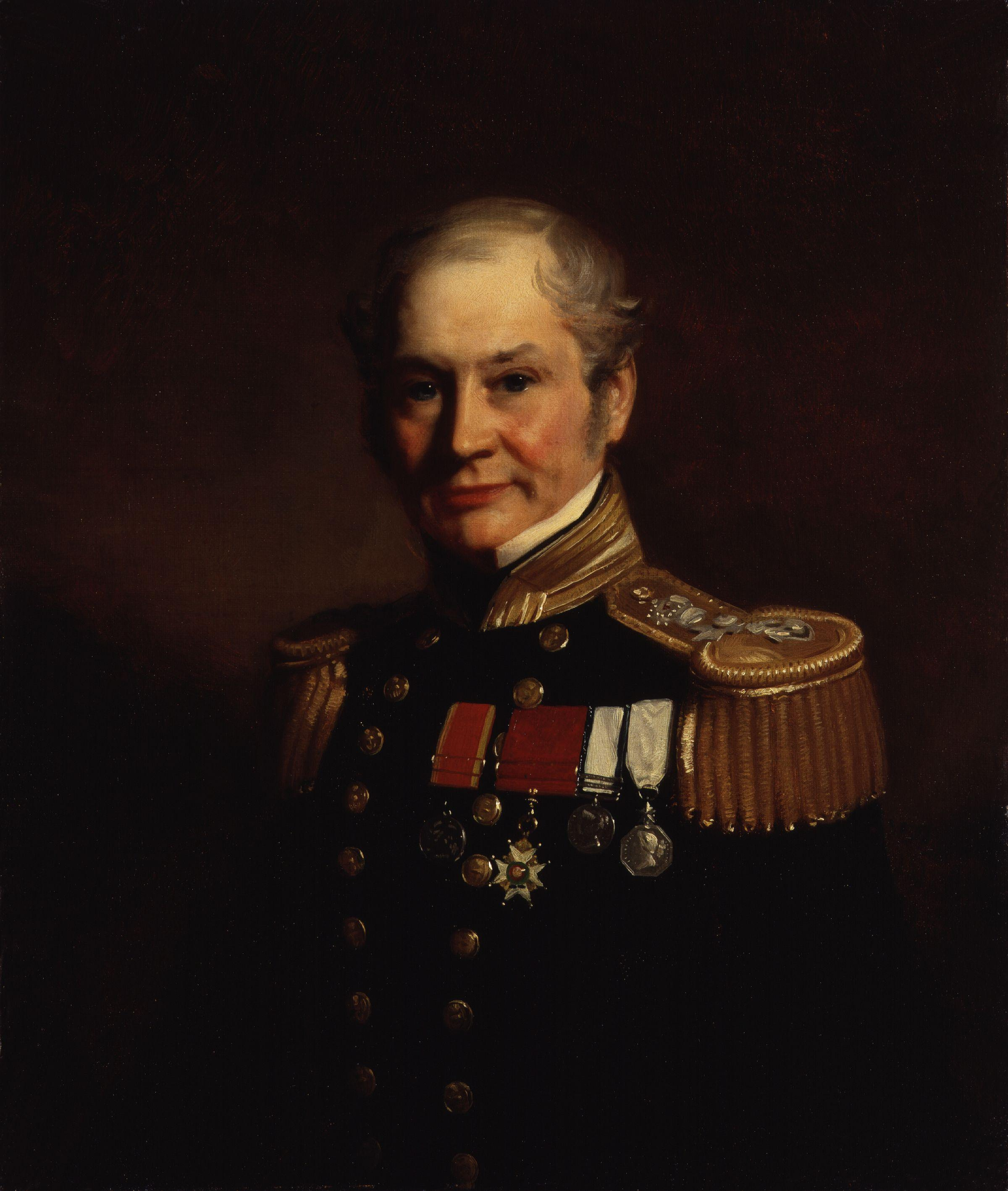
Edward Belcher - Franklin's lost expedition

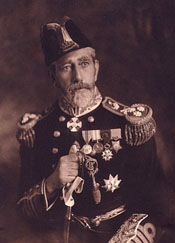
Charles Kingsmill
- George Edward Watts – War of 1812
- Philip Westphal – War of 1812

== Affiliations ==
The museum is part of a system of 55 museums run by the Canadian Department of National Defence. It is the largest naval museum within the system. The museum is also affiliated with the Canadian Heritage Information Network (CHIN) and works jointly with Nova Scotia's Maritime Museum of the Atlantic to present the naval history of the region.

== See also ==
- Military history of Nova Scotia
- List of oldest buildings and structures in Halifax, Nova Scotia
- Organization of Military Museums of Canada
