= Dollimore =

Dollimore is a surname. Notable people with this surname include:

- Helena Dollimore (born 1994), British politician
- Jean Dollimore, English computer scientist
- Jonathan Dollimore (born 1948), British philosopher and critic
- Kris Dollimore (born 1966), English rock guitarist
- Laverna Katie Dollimore (1922–2011), Canadian civil servant in the diplomatic corps
