= HMS Vernon (shore establishment) =

British naval research organization

Coordinates: 50.794°N 1.107°W

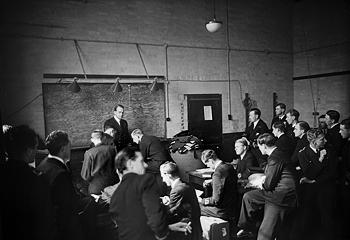
- Lieutenant Commander Peter Scott, RNVR, operational officer at HMS Vernon, briefs motor torpedo boat officers before they set off on anti-E-boat patrols, 1944

History

United Kingdom
- Name: Vernon
- Commissioned: 26 April 1876
- Decommissioned: Last elements on 1 April 1996
- Motto: Vernon Semper Viret
- Nickname(s): 'The Vernon'
- Fate: Decommissioned and operational elements dispersed

General characteristics
- Class & type: Stone frigate

HMS Vernon was a shore establishment or "stone frigate" of the Royal Navy in Portsmouth. Vernon was established on 26 April 1876, as the Royal Navy's Torpedo Branch also known as the Torpedo School, named after the ship HMS Vernon which served as part of its floating base. After the First World War, HMS Vernon moved ashore, taking over the Gunwharf site, where it continued to operate until 1 April 1996, when the various elements comprising the establishment were split up and moved to different commands.

== Foundation and early history ==
The second ship to be called HMS Vernon ended her career laid up in Chatham Dockyard as a floating coaling jetty. In 1872, she was moved to become a tender to HMS Excellent for torpedo and mining training. In 1874, she was joined by HMS Vesuvius, an iron screw torpedo vessel. Vesuvius was attached as an Experimental Tender for the conduct of torpedo trials, and remained in the role until 1923.

On 26 April 1876, Vernon was joined by the former steam frigate HMS Ariadne and the lighter Florence Nightingale. These were then commissioned as HMS Vernon, and became the home of the Royal Navy's Torpedo Branch, independent of HMS Excellent. Ariadne was used to provide accommodation. In January 1886, HMS Donegal replaced the original Vernon as a more spacious torpedo school ship. Donegal was renamed Vernon, the original Vernon was renamed Actaeon and took over as the practical workshop.

On 23 April 1895, the hulks were moved to Portchester Creek. Ariadne was replaced as an accommodation hulk by the old HMS Marlborough, which was renamed Vernon II and was connected by bridges to Actaeon and Vernon, jointly named Vernon I. In 1904, HMS Warrior joined the establishment as a floating workshop, power plant and wireless telegraphy school, renamed Vernon III. Meanwhile, Actaeon was renamed Vernon IV. Also in 1904, Ariadne was detached and sent to Sheerness to be used to establish a new torpedo school. She was renamed Actaeon in 1905.

== In wartime and onshore ==
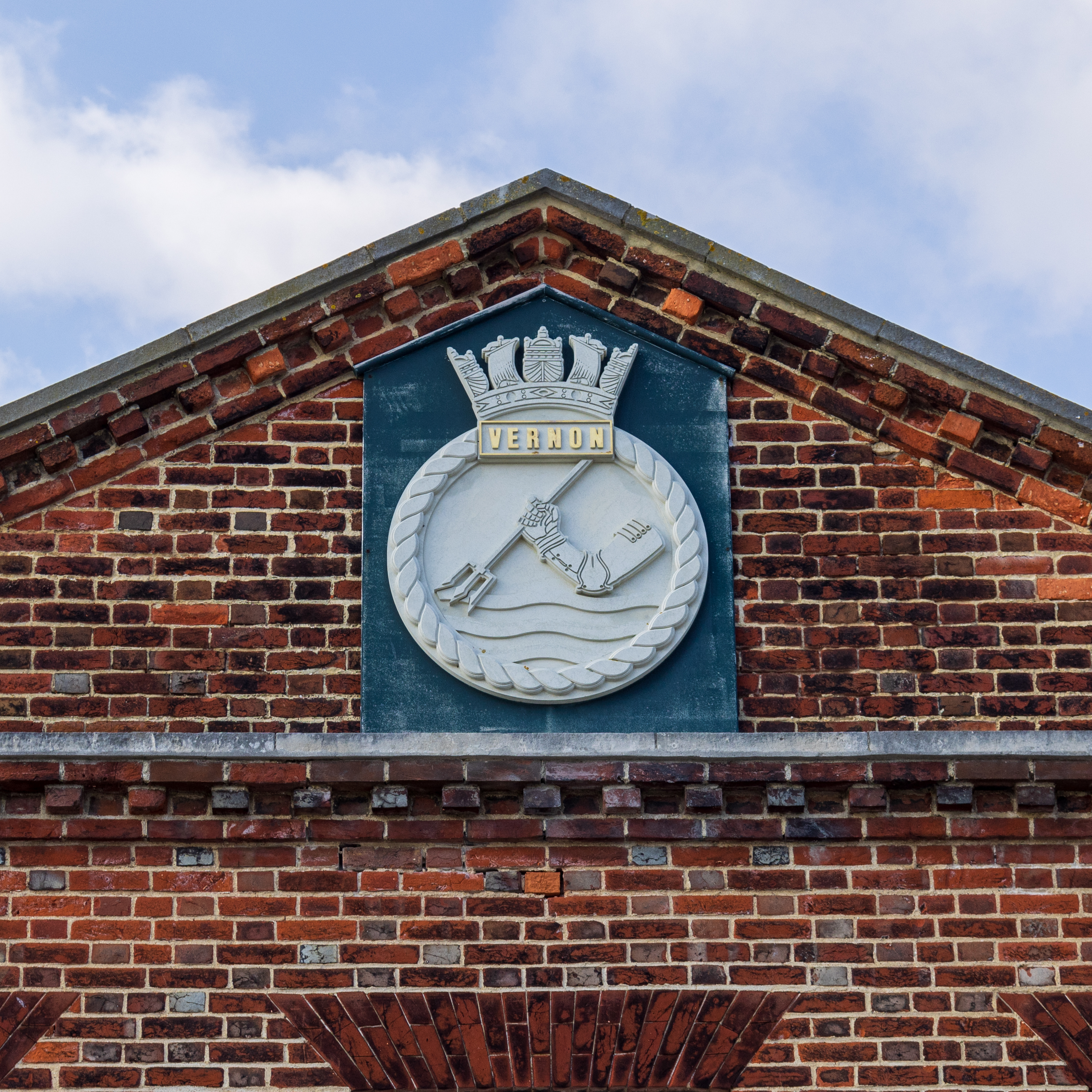
HMS Vernon's ship's badge on the old administration block, Gunwharf Quays.

On the outbreak of the First World War, Vernon was used to carry out torpedo trials and to train new recruits for the Navy. Extensive research and development was also carried to develop new anti-submarine devices, mines and ships' electrics. In September 1917, as part of the Signal School, a DCB Section was established to develop Radio Control for unmanned vessels from 'mother' aircraft.

On 1 October 1923, Vernon was moved ashore and new departments were set up to cover aspects of maritime warfare, such as mining, torpedoes and electrical equipment. The names of the original hulks that made up the floating Vernon were used for buildings in the base. Their Chief Scientist from the beginning (probably coming from off-shore research) was Professor Edward Philip Harrison FRSE, who remained in charge until 1937. During his tenure, Harrison significantly contributed to the development of magnetic mines.

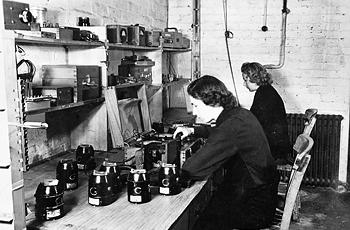
Wrens in HMS Vernon in 1945, assembling the secret firing units of ground mines used in special operations to foil German minesweeping operations

In the Second World War, and following on from the increasing use of mines, Vernon took on responsibility for mine disposal and developing mine countermeasures. The staff were able to capture a number of enemy mines and develop successful countermeasures. A number of officers working with Vernon were awarded Distinguished Service Orders for their successes in capturing new types of mine. One of these was Lieutenant Commander John Ouvry who defused the first intact German magnetic mine recovered by the Allies. It had been accidentally dropped by the Luftwaffe on the sands at Shoeburyness. The incident formed an important part of an episode of The Secret War, a BBC and Imperial War Museum production.

The Germans began placing booby traps in some mines to counter attempts by Vernon's staff to capture them. One exploded in a mining shed at Vernon on 6 August 1940, killing an officer and four ratings and seriously injuring a number of other personnel. To avoid a repetition of this, a nearby disused quarry, nicknamed HMS Mirtle (short for Mine Investigation Range), was used for examining mines.

Portsmouth suffered heavy air raids during the war, with Vernon being hit several times. One bomb demolished Dido Building and killed 100 people. Subsequently, sections of Vernon were dispersed to quieter areas. On 3 May 1941, most departments of Vernon were moved to Roedean School at Brighton, which was known as HMS Vernon (R), whilst other elements were relocated elsewhere on the south coast and further away.

On 1 October 1944, responsibility for naval diving passed from the Gunnery Branch, at HMS Excellent, to the Torpedo Branch, at Vernon. A new diving school known as Vernon(D) was established at Brixham on 27 October 1944, with administrative support in Dartmouth. The Brixham base was later joined by the Admiralty Experimental Diving Unit (AEDU) and the Deep Diving Tender HMS Tedworth. The unit remained at Brixham until 1 October 1945 when it returned to the main HMS Vernon at Portsmouth.

== Postwar devolution and decommissioning ==
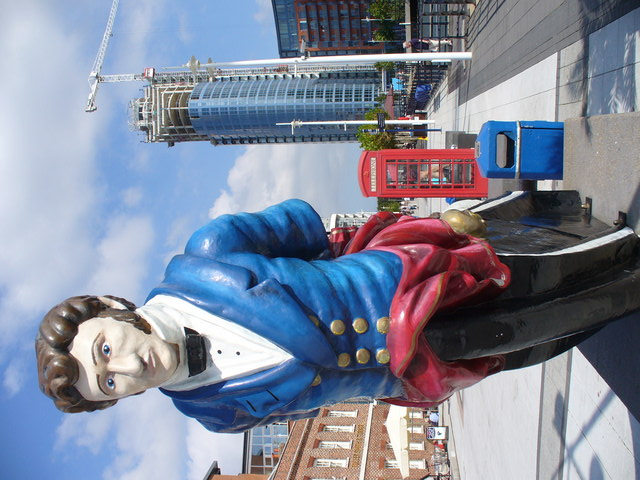
Old HMS Vernon figurehead, preserved at Gunwharf Quays

On 10 October 1946, the recently formed Electrical Branch took over responsibility for Electrical Operations from Vernon, whilst Vernon merged with the Anti-Submarine Branch, which had been based at HMS Osprey at Portland. The merger resulted in the formation of the Torpedo and Anti-Submarine (TAS) Branch, which assumed responsibility for naval diving. The TAS Branch remained at Vernon until mid-1974, when it was moved to become part of HMS Dryad prior to the formation of the Operations Branch the following year. Vernon housed the RN Diving School, training Clearance Divers for the Fleet Clearance diving teams and minehunters. The establishment was also the home of the "Dunker" Helicopter and Fixed Wing Aircraft Escape Training, until a new facility was opened at RNAS Yeovilton (HMS Heron).

Vernon ceased to be an independent command on 31 March 1986, when it was renamed HMS Nelson (Vernon Site), and in 1987 it was renamed HMS Nelson (Gunwharf) It became the Headquarters for the Commandant General Royal Marines for a brief period, and continued to be used for training. Mine warfare training was moved to the School of Maritime Operations (SMOPS), now part of HMS Dryad, in November 1995. The final element of the old Vernon, the diving school, was moved onto new premises on Horsea Island and Vernon closed on 1 April 1996.

The site was then sold and redeveloped, including the Gunwharf Quays shopping centre and residential accommodation. While most of the original buildings were demolished, much of the boundary wall, and some older buildings, were retained. The figurehead of the original HMS Vernon is preserved in Portsmouth.

== Captains of the Torpedo School ==
Included:

- Captain William Arthur, April 1876 – June 1879
- Captain William E. Gordon, June 1879 – February 1883
- Captain Albert Hastings Markham, February 1883 – May 1886
- Captain Samuel Long, May 1886 – January 1889
- Captain Arthur K. Wilson, January 1889 – February 1892
- Captain William H. Hall, February 1892 – November 1893
- Captain Sir Baldwin Wake-Walker, Bt, November 1893 – November 1895
- Captain John Durnford, November 1895 – October 1899
- Captain Charles G. Robinson, October 1899 – February 1902
- Captain George le C. Egerton, February 1902 – September 1904
- Captain Henry B. Jackson, September – December 1904
- Captain Charles J. Briggs, December 1904 – May 1907
- Captain Douglas A. Gamble, May 1907 – October 1908
- Captain Robert S. Phipps Hornby, October 1908 – November 1911
- Captain William C. M. Nicholson, November 1911 – September 1914
- Captain Frederick L. Field, September 1914 – September 1915
- Captain Harry L. d'E. Skipwith, September 1915 – July 1918
- Captain Frederick C. U. Vernon-Wentworth, July 1918 – March 1919
- Captain Arthur K. Waistell, March 1919 – April 1920
- Captain Christopher R. Payne, April 1920 – April 1922
- Captain John Derwent Allen, April 1922 – November 1924
- Captain Henry K. Kitson, November 1924 – November 1926
- Captain Nicholas E. Archdale, November 1926 – November 1928
- Captain Henry D. Bridges, November 1928 – November 1930
- Captain Stephen D. Tillard, November 1930 – August 1932
- Captain Alfred H. Taylor, August 1932 – August 1934
- Captain Roderick B. T. Miles, August 1934 – September 1935
- Captain Algernon U. Willis, September 1935 – April 1938
- Captain Denis W. Boyd, April 1938 – December 1939
- Rear-Admiral Brian Egerton, December 1939 – June 1943
- Captain Harold E. Morse, June 1943 – September 1944
- Captain Norman V. Grace, September 1944 – January 1946
- Captain John Hughes-Hallett, January 1946 – May 1948
- Captain Wilfrid J. C. Robertson, May 1948 – August 1950
- Captain Clarence D. Howard-Johnston, August 1950 – October 1952
- Captain Nicholas A. Copeman, October 1952 – December 1954
- Captain John Grant, December 1954 – December 1956
- Captain Edward A. Blundell, December 1956 – February 1959
- Captain Morgan C. Giles, February 1959 – January 1961
- Captain Hardress L. Lloyd, January 1961 – April 1963
- Captain Douglas M. H. Stobie, April 1963 – June 1965
- Captain Robert E. Lloyd, June 1965 – July 1967
- Captain William P. B. Barber, July 1967 – April 1969
- Captain Thomas K. Edge-Partington, April 1969 – October 1970
- Captain Stuart M.W. Farquharson-Roberts, October 1970 – November 1972
- Captain Robert S. Browning, November 1972 – July 1974
- Captain Geoffrey D. Trist, July 1974 – July 1976
- Captain Edward M. S. O'Kelly, July 1976 – August 1978
- Captain Stuart K. Sutherland, August 1978 – December 1980
- Captain George Oxley, December 1980 – March 1983
- Captain Jonathan D. W. Husband, March 1983 – 1986

== See also ==
- List of Royal Navy shore establishments
- Gunwharf Quays
- Admiralty Mining Establishment

== Bibliography ==
- Colledge, J. J.; Warlow, Ben & Bush, Steve (2020). Ships of the Royal Navy: The Complete Record of all Fighting Ships of the Royal Navy from the 15th Century to the Present (5th revised and updated ed.). Seaforth Publishing. ISBN 978-1-5267-9327-0.
- Mackie, Colin. (2017), Senior Royal Navy Appointments from 1865. Captain, Torpedo School. “HMS Vernon”. from 1876 until 1986, http://www.gulabin.com/ pp. 258–259.
- Warlow, B. (2000) [1992]. Shore Establishments of the Royal Navy (Revised and enlarged ed.). Maritime Books. ISBN 0-907771-73-4.
