= HMS Ariadne (1859) =

Ship, 1859

History

United Kingdom
- Name: HMS Ariadne
- Builder: Deptford Dockyard
- Launched: 1859
- Commissioned: 1859
- Decommissioned: 1873
- In service: 1859-1873
- Out of service: 1922
- Renamed: HMS Actaeon in 1905
- Reclassified: shore station and later training hulk
- Stricken: 1922
- Fate: Sold for scrap 1922

General characteristics
- Class & type: Walker screw frigate
- Displacement: 4,583 long tons (4,657 t)
- Length: 435 ft (133 m)
- Beam: 51 ft (16 m)
- Draught: 16 ft (4.9 m)
- Installed power: sail and steam @ 3350 horsepower
- Speed: ~13 knots
- Complement: 250 to 450
- Armament: 26 guns

HMS Ariadne was a 26 gun Walker screw frigate of the Royal Navy in service from 1859 to 1873. After decommissioning in 1873 it became a shore station from 1884 to 1905 and training hulk from 1905 to 1922.

== Early career ==
Ariadne was a screw frigate designed by Baldwin Walker.

She served in the Channel Squadron from 1859 to 1864.

In 1860 the ship carried the future King Edward VII (then as Prince of Wales) on a royal tour of Canada and United States.

== Later career and fate ==
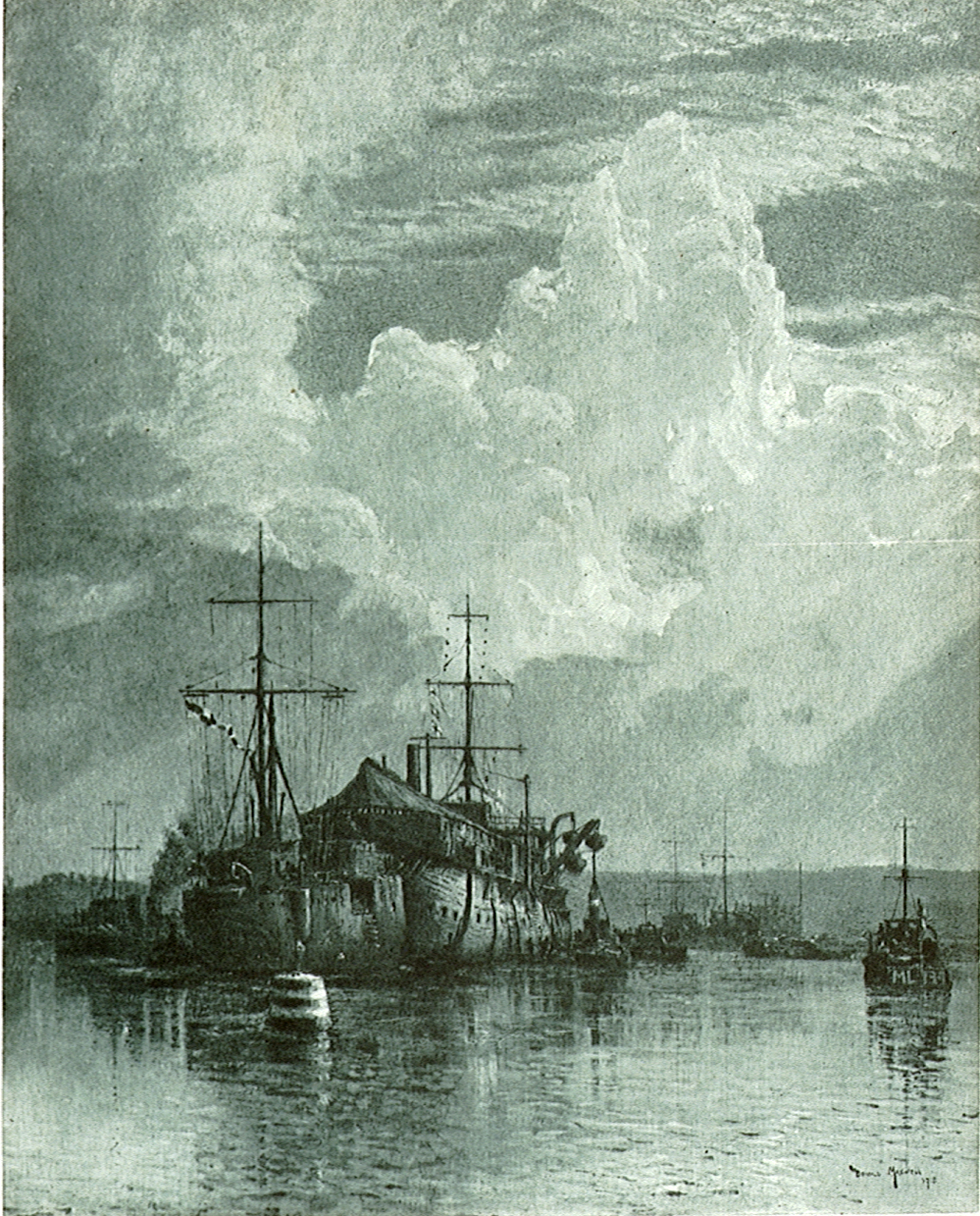
Dido and Araiadne comprised training school Actaeon, seen here in 1918

In 1884 she became part of the shore establishment HMS Vernon and served as a naval cadet training ship. She was renamed HMS Actaeon in 1905. As Actaeon, she was used only as a hulk by the naval torpedo school in Sheerness. She was paid off and sold for scrap in 1922. She was succeeded as shore station by HMS Dido in 1906. Her fate is unknown.
