= William Arthur (Royal Navy) =

Royal Navy officer

- Born: July 4, 1830
- Died: November 15, 1886 (aged 56)
- Military career
- Allegiance: United Kingdom
- Branch: Royal Navy

William Arthur CB RN (4 July 1830 – 15 November 1886) was a Royal Navy officer after whom Port Arthur in China was named.

== Career ==
Arthur entered the navy at age fifteen in July 1845. He was commissioned as a Lieutenant on 8 March 1854, and two years later in 1856, he acquired his first experience of command on the gunboat HMS Manly. On 4 June 1858 he was given command of the gunvessel HMS Algerine. In August 1860, during the Second Opium War, Port Arthur was named by Commander John Ward of HMS Actaeon, after Lt. Arthur, whose Algerine was the first British ship to enter the harbour at Lüshun, at that time an unfortified fishing village. The British referred to Lüshun as Port Arthur from this point on, and the Russians and other Western powers adopted the British name. Port Arthur was a fortified harbour city which changed hands several times, variously occupied by Britain, Imperial Russia, Japan and the Soviet Union before returning to Chinese ownership in 1950.

Arthur was promoted to Commander on 1 April 1861 and Captain on 15 April 1867. He was Captain of the Torpedo School, April 1876 – June 1879. He served as a naval attaché in Washington, D.C., 1879 – 1882, before being given command of HMS Hector which was assigned as Queen Victoria's guard ship when the Queen was in residence at Osborne House on the Isle of Wight. He was promoted to the rank of Rear-Admiral on 31 March 1885.

He died at Bakeham Grange, Egham, on 15 November 1886, aged 56. He was buried at St Mary's Church, Atherington, Devon with his family; his father had been rector there. His widow, Mary Jane Arthur (née le Mesurier) erected a monument to her husband in St Ann's Church, HMNB Portsmouth.
