= Laverna Katie Dollimore =

Canadian secretary and Order of Canada recipient (1922–2011)

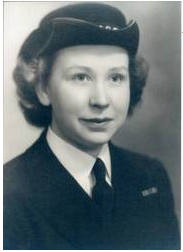
Laverna Katie Dollimore in 1939.

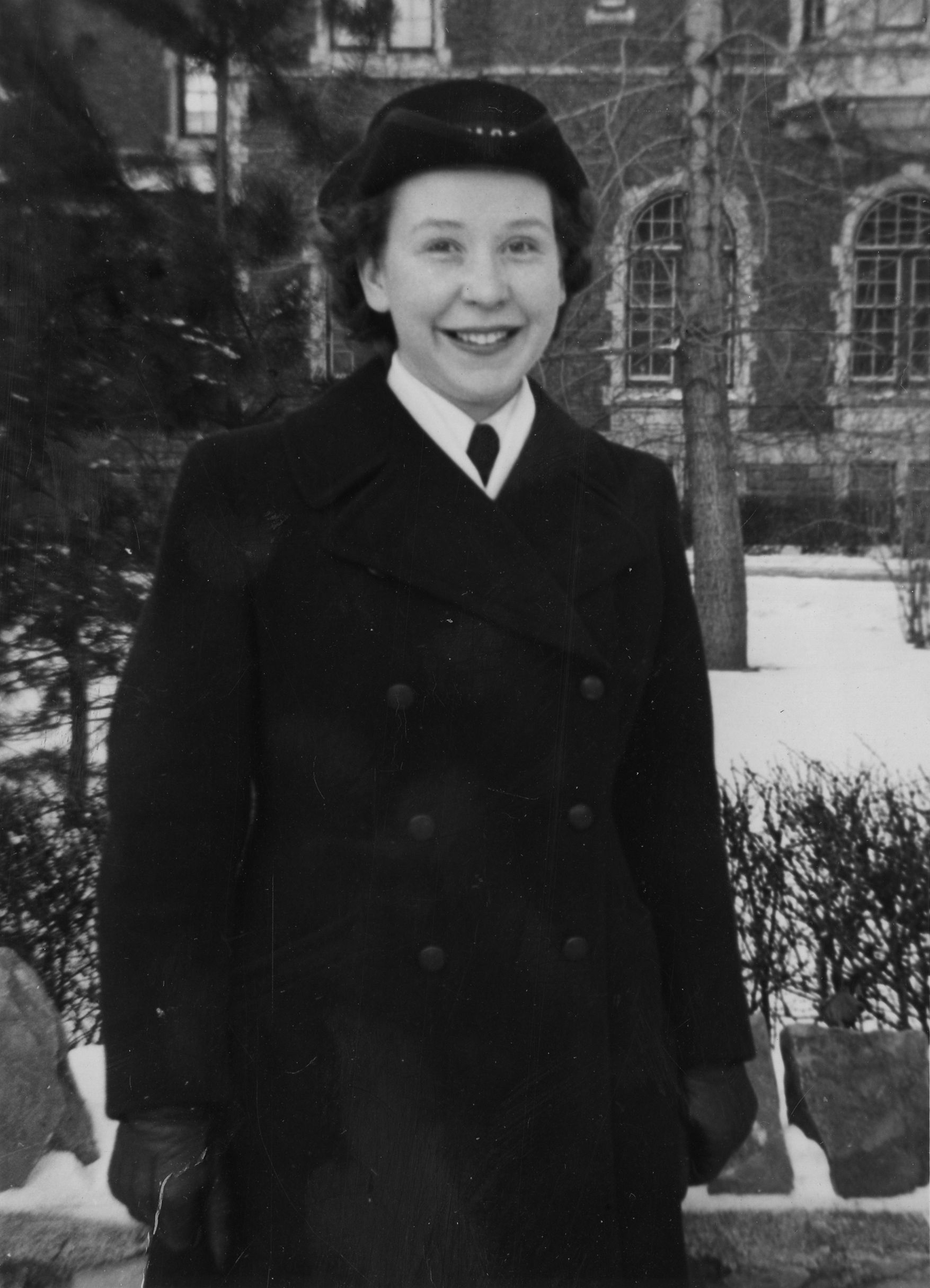
Dollimore in 1944.

Laverna "Verna" Katie Dollimore OC (January 22, 1922 – October 24, 2011) was one of six Canadians awarded the Order of Canada for her participation in the Canadian Caper, in which the Canadian government and the CIA orchestrated the cover rescue of six American diplomats in Iran (1979). Her Order of Canada Medal is on display at the Maritime Command Museum.

Laverna Katie Dollimore was born in Toronto, Ontario on 22 January 1922. Her parents, William Dollimore and Eva Somner, emigrated to Canada in 1915 on the penultimate voyage of the RMS Lusitania. Dollimore was the youngest of three children, preceded by brother, Hedley, and sister, Neysa. She attended Oakwood Collegiate High School and then Western Technical Commercial School for business, graduating in 1938.

For five years she did secretarial or bookkeeping jobs for companies in Toronto, including Jenny Lind Candy Shops and Dominion Paper Box Co. In 1942 she joined the Women's Royal Canadian Naval Service and was posted to HMCS Cornwallis in Halifax. Despite taking the Petty Officer exam, the war concluded before Dollimore could follow that path and she returned to Toronto to continue in her previous line of work.

In 1956, she took the public service exam and joined the Department of External Affairs. Dollimore worked in a number of Canadian embassies, such as Cairo, following the Suez Crisis, Poland, Kuala Lumpur, Leopoldville (now Kinshasa, DRC), and many others. During her time she worked for notable members of the diplomatic corps, including Robert Ford, G. Hamilton Southam, Charles Ritchie, and Paul Martin Sr.

She joined the International Commission for Supervision and Control, under Percy Stewart Cooper in Laos in 1969. For her services there she received the Canadian Peacekeeping Service Medal.

Dollimore's most notable posting came in 1977, when she joined the Canadian embassy in Tehran, just ahead of the Iranian Revolution. There, she was the personal secretary to Kenneth Taylor and assisted in the 'Canadian Caper'. Despite being given the option to leave Tehran in 1979, Dollimore remained until 1980; along with Roger Lucy, Ken Taylor, and Sgt. Claude Gauthier, she was one of the last Canadians to leave the embassy in Tehran. For her service, she received the Order of Canada.

For the remainder of her time with Foreign Affairs, Dollimore was posted to Addis Ababa, Ethiopia. She retired in 1983 to Brighton, Ontario. Every five years she attended a 'Canadian Caper' reunion, hosting the 2005 party. She died of natural causes in 2011.
