= HMS Dido (1869) =

Sloop of the Royal Navy

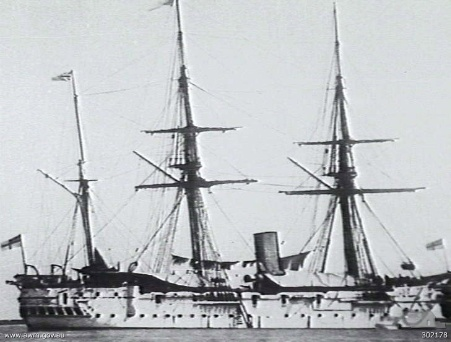
- HMS Dido circa. 1871

History

United Kingdom
- Name: HMS Dido
- Namesake: Dido
- Builder: Portsmouth Dockyard
- Launched: 23 October 1869
- Completed: 20 April 1871
- Decommissioned: Lent to the War Dept as a hulk, 1886
- Renamed: HMS Actaeon II, 1906
- Fate: Sold for scrap, 17 July 1922

General characteristics (as built)
- Class & type: Eclipse-class wooden screw sloop (later corvette)
- Displacement: 1,760 long tons (1,790 t)
- Tons burthen: 1,268 bm
- Length: 212 ft (64.6 m) (p/p)
- Beam: 36 ft (11.0 m)
- Draught: 16 ft 6 in (5.0 m)
- Depth: 21 ft 6 in (6.6 m)
- Installed power: 2,518 ihp (1,878 kW)
- Propulsion: 1 shaft; 1 × 2-cylinder horizontal steam engine; 4 × rectangular boilers
- Sail plan: Ship rig
- Speed: 13 knots (24 km/h; 15 mph)
- Complement: 180
- Armament: 2 × 7-inch rifled muzzle-loading guns; 4 × 6.3-inch 64-pounder rifled muzzle-loading guns

HMS Dido was an Eclipse-class wooden screw sloop built for the Royal Navy in 1869. She was the fourth ship of the Royal Navy to bear the name. She was reclassified in 1876 as a corvette, and in 1906 renamed Actaeon II. She served as a mine depot ship and was merged into the Torpedo School at Sheerness, being sold for breaking in 1922.

== Design ==
Designed by Edward Reed, the Royal Navy Director of Naval Construction, the hull was of wooden construction, with iron cross beams. A ram bow was fitted.

=== Propulsion ===
Propulsion was provided by a two-cylinder horizontal single-expansion steam engine by Humphrys, Tennant & Company driving a single screw.

=== Sail Plan ===
All the ships of the class were built with a ship rig, but this was altered to a barque rig.

=== Armament ===
The Eclipse class was designed with two 7-inch (6½-ton) muzzle-loading rifled guns mounted in traversing slides and four 64-pounder muzzle-loading rifled guns. They were re-classified as corvettes in 1876, carrying 12 guns.

== History ==
=== Launch and Commissioning ===
Dido was launched at Portsmouth Dockyard on 23 October 1869 and commissioned into the Royal Navy on 20 April 1871 for service on the West Coast of Africa, leaving England on 6 May.

=== West Africa Station (1871) ===
Dido called at Madeira, arriving at Sierra Leone on 9 June. She relieved HMS Sirius at Fernando Po on 16 July. The Times of Thursday 8 June 1876 tells the story of her next adventure:

Three months later, war having broken out afresh between the kingdoms of New Calabar, Bonny, and Ekrika, thereby bringing all European trade in the rivers to a standstill, Capt. Chapman, acting under instructions from the Admiralty, proceeded with the squadron under his orders up the Bonny River - one of the mouths of the Niger - to settle the native disputes, using force, if necessary, to open up the rivers for trade. This he accomplished most satisfactorily in conjunction with the British Consul, Capt. Hopkins, by prevailing on the contending parties to meet on board the Dido, where their mutual grievances were adjusted and peace re-established at a palaver which lasted four days. The result proved a lasting benefit to the European merchants as well as to the native Kings and Chiefs, the oil trade soon reaching the large proportions of nearly half a million per annum.

In December 1871 Dido arrived at Simonstown, where Captain Chapman was to act as the Senior Officer during the absence of the Commodore on the West Coast. Five months later, on 16 May 1872, she left the Cape for Sydney, having been ordered to join the Australian Station.

=== Australia Station (1872 - 1875) ===
On her way to Sydney Dido paused at St. Paul's, where the remains of Megaera were still to be seen. She arrived at Sydney on 3 July 1872, and then spent nine months in New Zealand, followed by a journey to Fiji in February 1873. The islands of Fiji were in a state of chaos, with the relationship between the government of King Cakabau and the European settlers brought to crisis point by the murder of the Burns family. The Times relates what happened:

Bloodshed would have ensued had not Capt. Chapman, at considerable risk, taken the Dido through an intricate passage for 80 miles among the coral reefs to the Ba river, and, having invited a large number of the disaffected settlers on board, prevailed upon them to lay down their arms, the Government granting a general amnesty to all concerned, with the exception of the two ringleaders, who were detained on board for a short time in order to prevent the authorities from taking any steps against them.

After remaining in Fiji for six months she left for Sydney, pausing at the islands of the New Hebrides, Solomon, New Ireland, and Carolines to return kidnapped South Sea Islanders. After a stay of six months in Sydney, where a new cylinder was made, the ship returned to Fiji in July 1874, having called at Norfolk Island on her way.

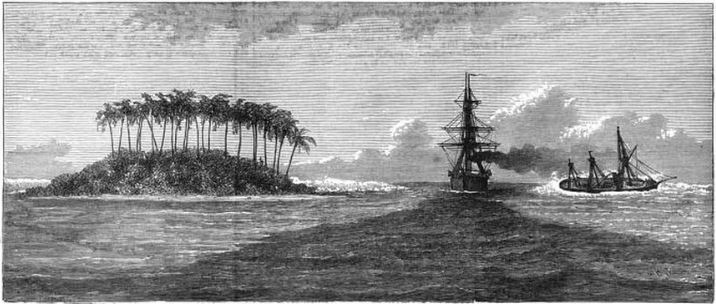
Dido arrives to assist the wrecked French unprotected cruiser L'Hermitte (1867) at Wallis Island. Illustrated London News 1874

On 17 July news arrived of the wreck of the French warship L'Hermite at Wallace Island, and Dido at once went to her assistance. In September, Sir Hercules Robinson, the Governor of New South Wales, arrived in HMS Pearl to reopen negotiations for the cession of the islands. The ship took a prominent part in the ceremony which marked the final cession of Fiji to Great Britain on 10 October 1874, during which the ex-King presented the Fijian flag to Captain Chapman, when it was hauled down for the last time to make room for the Union Flag. Dido carried King Cakabau to Sydney to visit the Governor of New South Wales, and returned with him to Fiji a month later. Some sources ascribe to this visit the introduction of measles among the native population. Having no immunity to the disease, large loss of life resulted. On 7 February 1875 she again left Fiji and, calling at New Caledonia, she sailed for Auckland. After five months in and around New Zealand Dido returned to Sydney, where she learnt of the death of Commodore Goodenough from poisoned arrows in the Santa Cruz Islands. Captain Chapman received his appointment as Commodore by telegram from the Admiralty.

During her last days on the Australian Station Dido visited Tasmania, leaving Sydney on 2 December for Melbourne, where Commodore Chapman relinquished command of the station to Captain Hoskins. HMS Sapphire arrived to relieve her, and she sailed for home.

A good passage was made to within 200 miles of Cape Pillar. Here, on 20 February, was encountered one of the most furious gales over experienced by any one on board. Although the ship was put under storm canvas, consisting of a close-reefed maintopsail and storm forestaysail, both were blown away, and soon followed by the fall of the fore and main topmasts and jibboom; the barometer fell to 28.15, the wind increased to a hurricane, and rapidly raised a tremendous sea. Fortunately the gale did not remain at its height f or more .than four hours, and, soon abating, the ship was enabled, to proceed on her voyage, and entered the Straits of Magellan, where she refitted; but, being unable to obtain spars at Sandy Point, she called at Montevideo for that purpose, as well as for provisions. The Dido left the River Plate on the 1st of April, crossed the line on the 27th, touched at Fayal (Azores) on the 21st of May, experienced successive calms and light winds until the 2d of June, and arrived at Spithead on the 6th.

— The Times, 8 June 1876

=== Out of commission (1876 - 1879) ===
On 6 June 1876 Dido returned to Spithead after a five-year commission on the West Africa Station and Australian Station, during which she covered over 60,000 nautical miles (110,000 km) in 616 days at sea. She recommissioned at Portsmouth on 27 May 1879, now as a 12-gun corvette, commanded by Captain Arthur Richard Wright.

=== West Africa Station and the First Boer War (1879 - 1881) ===
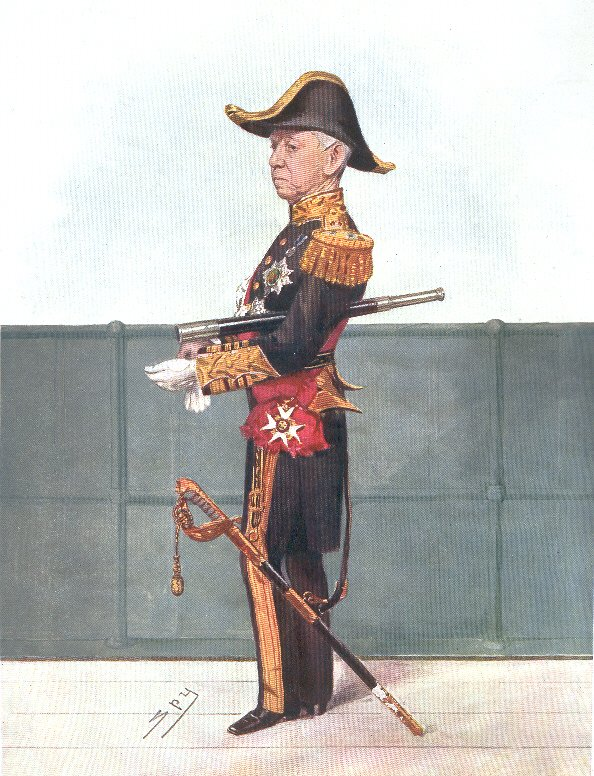
Compton Edward Domvile in a Leslie Ward caricature

Dido served on the West Africa Station, where Captain Wright died in command on 19 August 1879. He was succeeded by Captain Compton Edward Domvile on 19 September 1879.

In 1881 Dido contributed 50 men and two field guns to a Naval Brigade, which went to the front under Lieutenant Henry Ogle. Dido lost 3 killed and 3 wounded at the Battle of Majuba Hill on 27 February. Captain Compton Domvile went to the front to take charge of the Naval Brigade, but no further action took place before the end of the war on 23 March.

=== North America and West Indies Station (1881 - 1886) ===
The ship was reassigned to the North America and West Indies Station, based at the Royal Naval Dockyard in Bermuda, in October 1881. In 1883, Dido as specially prepared to carry Princess Louise from Charleston, South Carolina, to winter in Bermuda, embarking the Princess at Charleston at 17:00 on the 24 January and arriving about noon on the 29 January at Grassy Bay (the anchorage of the Fleet in the Great Sound), from where the Princess was carried by HM Tender Supply to Hamilton Harbour, then rowed ashore to Front Street in the City of Hamilton where the Governor and military Commander-in-Chief of Bermuda, Lieutenant-General Thomas LJ Gallwey, waited. From there the ship was steamed to Barbados, to be paid off on 16 February 1883. The paid off crew returned to England, via Bermuda, aboard HMS Tamar. On recommissioning Captain Frederick Samuel Vander-Meulen commanded her on the station until 1886, when she returned home to Portsmouth.

=== Hulk (1886) ===
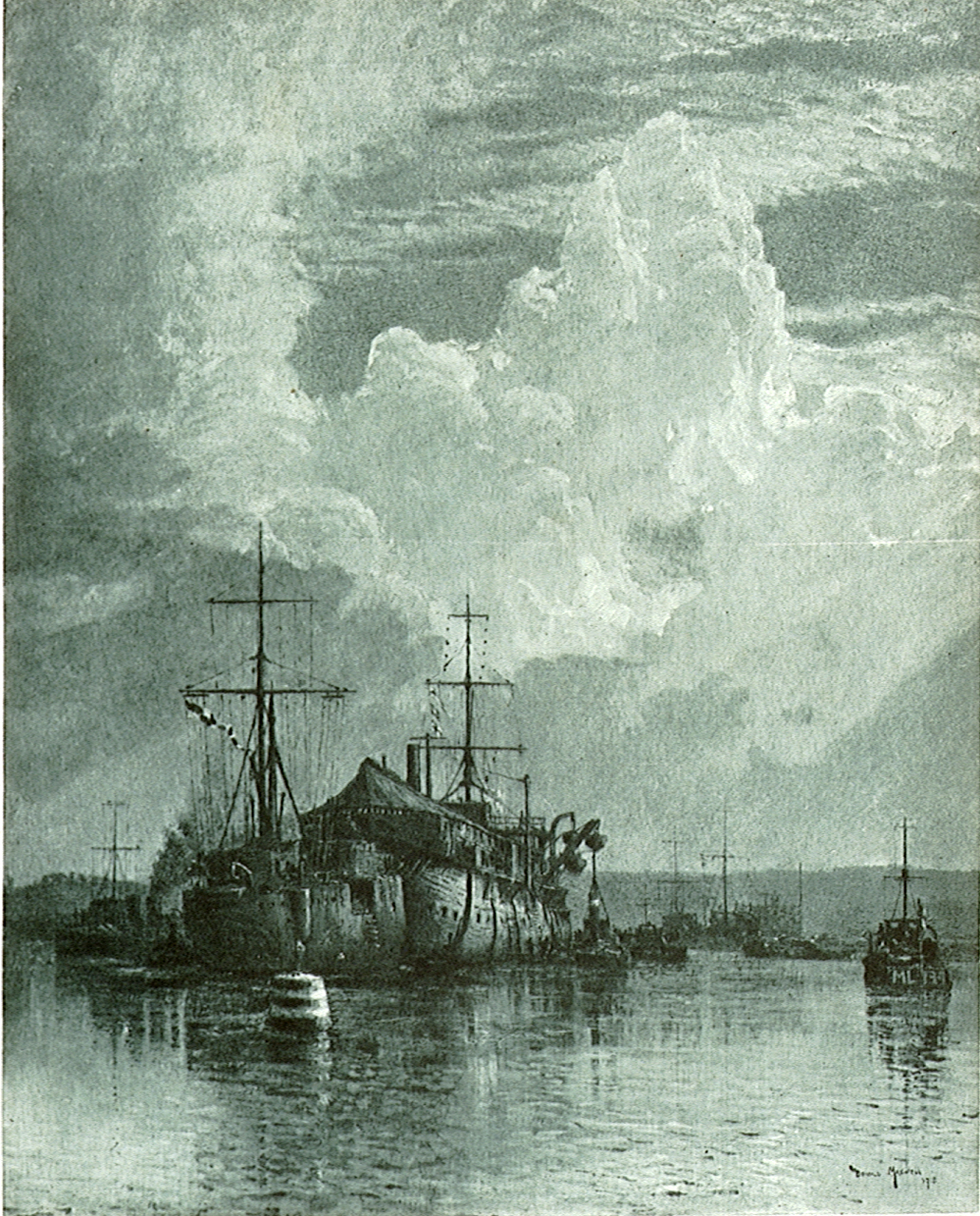
Dido and Araiadne comprised training school Actaeon, seen here in 1918

On 25 September 1886 Dido paid off at Portsmouth and her sea-going equipment was removed so that her hull could be used for accommodation and storage. She served as a mine depot in the Firth of Forth, and in 1906 her name was changed to Actaeon II. She became part of the Torpedo School at Sheerness.

== Disposal ==
Actaeon II was sold to J B Garnham for breaking on 17 July 1922.

== Bibliography ==
- Ballard, G. A. (1938). "British Sloops of 1875: The Smaller Ram-Bowed Type". Mariner's Mirror. 24 (April). Cambridge, UK: Society for Nautical Research: 160–75. doi:10.1080/00253359.1938.10657281.
- Chesneau, Roger; Kolesnik, Eugene M., eds. (1979). Conway's All the World's Fighting Ships 1860-1905. Greenwich, UK: Conway Maritime Press. ISBN 0-8317-0302-4.
- Lyon, David & Winfield, Rif (2004). The Sail and Steam Navy List: All the Ships of the Royal Navy 1815–1889. Chatham Publishing. ISBN 978-1-86176-032-6. OCLC 52620555.
