= HMS Vernon (1832) =

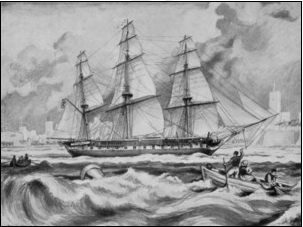
HMS Vernon

HMS Vernon was a 50-gun fourth rate launched in 1832. She became tender to the Navy's gunnery school HMS Excellent, and then the torpedo school ship in 1876. She was renamed HMS Actaeon in 1886 and sold in 1923.

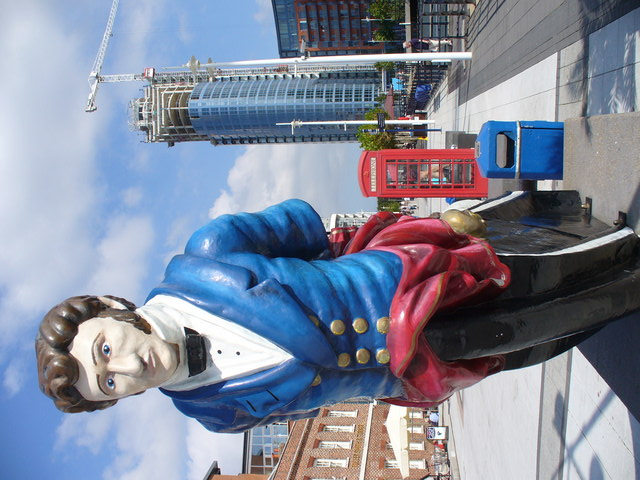
Her figurehead and No 1 Gunwharf Quay, Portsmouth

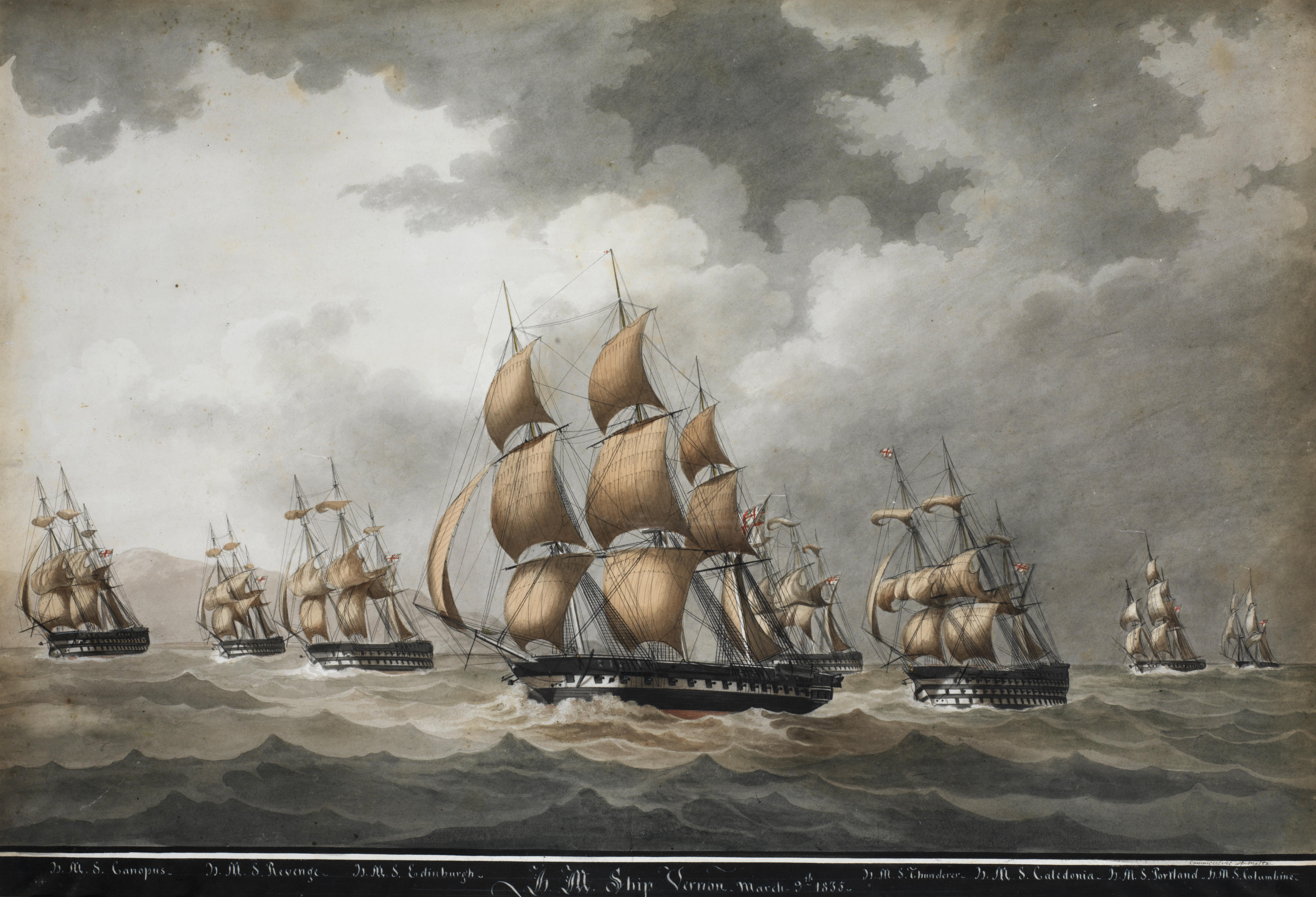
Vernon in the lead near Malta, seven warships proceeding under sail 1835, by Cammillieri
