= Cumberland (disambiguation) =

Cumberland is one of the historic counties of England.

Cumberland may also refer to:

== Places ==
=== Australia ===
- Cumberland, Queensland, a ghost town west of Georgetown
- Cumberland County, New South Wales, containing most of the Sydney metropolitan area
- Cumberland Council, New South Wales
- Cumberland Islands (Queensland)
- Cumberland Park, South Australia, a suburb south of Adelaide
- Cumberland Land District, Tasmania
- Cumberland Plain, a biogeographical region in Sydney
- Cumberland Plain Woodland, a woodland community in Sydney

=== Canada ===
- Cumberland, Edmonton, Alberta, a neighbourhood
- Cumberland (federal electoral district), former district in Nova Scotia
- Cumberland (Nova Scotia provincial electoral district), former district
- Cumberland (Saskatchewan provincial electoral district), current district
- Cumberland (territorial electoral district), former district in what is now Saskatchewan
- Cumberland, British Columbia
- Cumberland, Ontario (disambiguation), three locations within the Canadian province of Ontario
- Cumberland County, Nova Scotia
- Cumberland House, Saskatchewan
- Cumberland House Provincial Park, Saskatchewan
- Cumberland Lake, Saskatchewan
- Cumberland Sound, an inlet into Baffin Island

=== United States ===
==== Place names by state ====
- Cumberland County (disambiguation), in 10 of the United States, as well as in Canada and Australia
- Cumberland, Georgia, an edge city of Atlanta, business district, and neighborhood
- Cumberland Island, in Eastern Georgia, a geographical feature and a town
  - Cumberland Island National Seashore
- Cumberland, Indiana
- Cumberland, Iowa
- Cumberland, Kentucky
- Cumberland, Maine in Cumberland County
  - Cumberland Center, Maine
- Cumberland, Maryland
  - Cumberland Narrows
  - Cumberland Bone Cave, a fossil-filled cave, Wills Mountain, Allegany County, Maryland
- Cumberland, New Jersey
- Cumberland Head, New York
- Cumberland, Ohio
- Cumberland, Oklahoma
- Cumberland Township, Adams County, Pennsylvania
- Cumberland Township, Greene County, Pennsylvania
- Cumberland, Rhode Island, a town
  - Cumberland Hill, Rhode Island, within the town
- Cumberland Gap, Tennessee, a town within Cumberland Gap National Historical Park
  - Cumberland Gap National Historical Park (see also below)
- Cumberland City, Tennessee, in Stewart County on the Cumberland River
- Cumberland, Virginia in Cumberland County
- Cumberland, New Kent County, Virginia
- Cumberland (New Kent, Virginia), a historic farm property
- Cumberland, Washington
- Cumberland, Wisconsin, a city
- Cumberland, Barron County, Wisconsin, a town

==== Regional features ====
- Cumberland Gap, a pass through the Appalachian Mountains near the junction of Kentucky, Virginia, and Tennessee
- Cumberland Mountains in Tennessee and Kentucky
- Cumberland Plateau in Tennessee and Kentucky
- Cumberland River in Tennessee and Kentucky
  - Cumberland Falls
  - Lake Cumberland, an artificial lake on the Cumberland River
- Cumberland Road, a historical road, part of the National Road, the first US federal highway
- Cumberland Valley, in Pennsylvania and Maryland
- Cumberland Valley AVA, wine region

=== Other places ===
- Cumberland (constituency), Cumbria, England, a former constituency
- Cumberland (unitary authority area), Cumbria, England, covering a similar area to the historic county
- Cumberland, Saint Vincent and the Grenadines
- Cumberland (ward), one of the ancient divisions of the county of Cumberland, England
- Cumberland River (disambiguation)

== People ==
- Cumberland (surname)
- Duke of Cumberland, a former and currently suspended peerage of England, Great Britain and the United Kingdom
- Earl of Cumberland, a former peerage of England

== Companies ==
- Cumberland Drugs, a defunct chain of pharmacies located in Quebec and eastern Ontario
- Cumberland Farms, a chain of convenience stores found primarily in the northeastern United States
- Cumberland Records, a record label

== Education ==
- Cumberland School of Law, in Birmingham, Alabama
- Cumberland University, in Lebanon, Tennessee
- University of the Cumberlands in Williamsburg, Kentucky

== Food ==
- Cumberland sauce, a fruit-based sauce
- Cumberland sausage, a traditional sausage recipe in Britain

== Healthcare institutions ==
- Cumberland Infirmary, a hospital in Carlisle
- West Cumberland Hospital, a hospital in Whitehaven

== Ships ==
- Cumberland (ship), four merchant ships
- HMS Cumberland, eleven ships of the Royal Navy
- USS Cumberland, three ships of the United States Navy
- Queen of Cumberland, a BC Ferries vessel

== Sports ==
- Cumberland (rugby league team), a team in the inaugural New South Wales Rugby League competition
- Cumberland United, an Association Football club in Adelaide, Australia

== Other uses ==
- 1964 Cumberland B-52 crash, an accident involving a nuclear bomber
- Army of the Cumberland, part of the Union Army in the American Civil War
- Cumberland Arms, a pub in Adelaide, South Australia
- Cumberland Building Society, a building society
- Cumberland Hotel, Marble Arch, Westminster, England
- Cumberland Presbyterian Church, a Presbyterian denomination in Protestant Christianity
- Cumberland station (disambiguation), stations of the name
