= Cumberland Township =

Cumberland Township may refer to:

- Cumberland Township, Adams County, Pennsylvania, USA
- Cumberland Township, Greene County, Pennsylvania, USA
- Cumberland Township, Ontario, which was incorporated as the City of Cumberland in 1999

== See also ==
- Cumberland (disambiguation)
