= Cumberland (ship) =

Several vessels have been named Cumberland for the county of Cumberland:

- Cumberland (1800 ship) was launched at Rotherhithe and sailed as a West Indiaman until 1807 or 1808 when she was sold to Enderbys. She then made five voyages as a South Seas whaler. Enderbys sold Cumberland and she proceeded to sail between England and Australia. In 1827 she sailed from Hobart and was never seen again. It later transpired that pirates had captured her off the Falkland Islands and killed her crew and passengers.
- Cumberland (1802 EIC ship) was launched as a 3-decker East Indiaman. She made seven voyages between India and England from 1802 to 1815 for the British East India Company. Her most notable voyage was her second when she fought in the Battle of Pulo Aura against a French squadron. In 1818 the Chilean government arranged for her purchase. When she arrived in Chile the Chileans took her into their navy as San Martín. As part of the First Chilean Navy Squadron she participated in 1818 in the defeat of a Spanish expeditionary force. She was wrecked off the coast of Peru in 1821.
- Cumberland (1826 ship) was built at Holyhead as a steam packet. In 1839 she apparently was repaired/restored and became a barque. In 1846 she transported Parkhurst apprentices to the Swan River Colony. In October 1849 she foundered while carrying a cargo of rice from Bali to Hong Kong.
- Cumberland (1827 ship) was built in India, probably at Cochin but possibly at Surat. She sailed to Great Britain and assumed British registration. She was wrecked off the coast of Western Australia in March 1830.

== See also ==
- HMS Cumberland – One of 11 vessels of the British Royal Navy by that name.
- USS Cumberland – One of three vessels of the United States Navy by that name.
