= Cumberland district =

Cumberland district may refer to any of the following districts:

- Cumberland (district), a district of Cumbria, England created in 2023
- Cumberland District (VHSL), in the Virginia High School League

== Canada ==
- Cumberland (federal electoral district), a former district in Nova Scotia
- Cumberland (Nova Scotia provincial electoral district), a former district
- Cumberland (Saskatchewan provincial electoral district), a current district
- Cumberland (territorial electoral district), a former district in what is now Saskatchewan

== See also ==
- Cumberland (disambiguation)
