= Royal Navy Burying Ground (Halifax, Nova Scotia) =

Cemetery in Nova Scotia, Canada

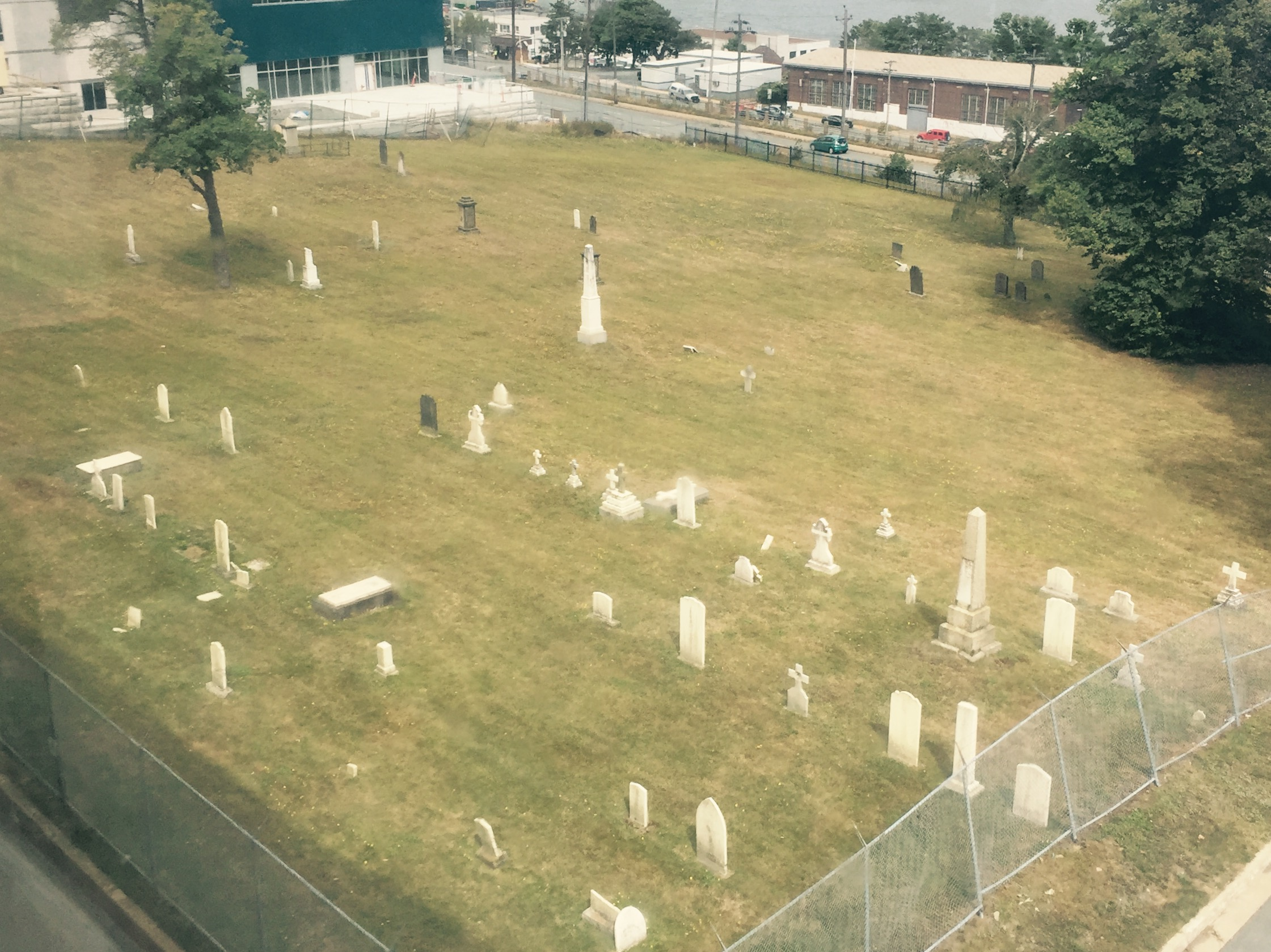
- Royal Navy Burying Ground, Halifax, Nova Scotia
- Interactive map of Royal Navy Burying Ground

Details
- Established: 1781
- Location: Halifax, Nova Scotia
- Country: Canada
- Coordinates: 44.661331°N 63.591574°W
- Type: Closed
- Owned by: Naval Museum of Halifax
- No. of graves: 400+
- Website: Official website
- Find a Grave: Royal Navy Burying Ground

The Royal Navy Burying Ground is part of the Naval Museum of Halifax and was the Naval Hospital cemetery for the North America and West Indies Station at Halifax, Nova Scotia. It is the oldest military burial ground in Canada. The cemetery has grave markers to those who died while serving at Halifax and were treated at the Naval medical facility or died at sea. Often shipmates and officers had the grave markers erected to mark the deaths of the crew members who died while in the port of Halifax.

The number of burials is estimated at over 400, however, there are only 89 stone markers remaining. There was a register of deaths established in 1860 for the burial ground. As well, surgeons of a ship registered the deaths of crew members, including how the person died and where they were buried. These reports were entered in the official register, with a detailed account sent quarterly to the Medical Director-General, Admiralty, England. (Note: There is a list of burials from 1860 until 1905, which was held at the Public Record Office, Chancery Lane, and is now at the British National Archives.) There is no local record of who is buried. The four most common causes of death in order are: disease, falling from the topmast, drowning, and death as a result of naval battles.

Along with two monuments that commemorate casualties of the War of 1812, the most prominent markers are for the crew that died on the flagships of the North American and West Indies Station: HMS Winchester (1841), HMS Wellesley (1850), HMS Cumberland (1852), HMS Indus (1859), HMS Nile (1861), HMS Duncan (1866), and HMS Royal Alfred (1869). There were many buried during the wars of the 18th century (American Revolution, French Revolutionary War and Napoleonic Wars) that do not have grave markers.

== Flagships of the North America and West Indies Station (1836–1869) ==
The following is a list of the flagships and their commanders who commemorated their lost crew members through erecting a monument in the Burying Ground. Some monuments reflect those killed in a single event and other monuments include all those who were killed while the flagship was stationed on the North America and West Indies Station at Halifax. After the names of the ship there is a date that is the year the last person listed on the monument died.

=== Crew of HMS Vernon (1836) ===
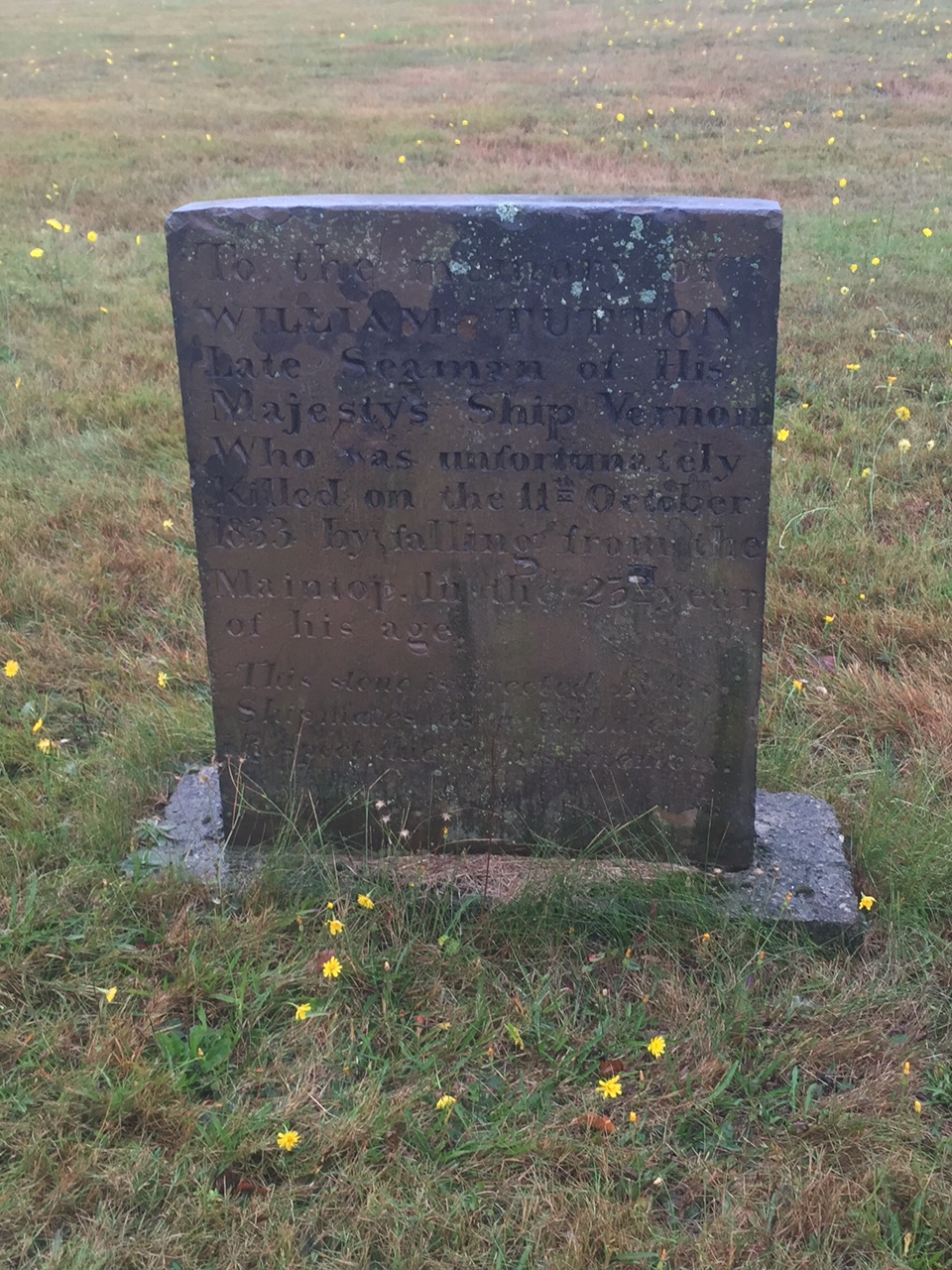
HMS Vernon (1833)

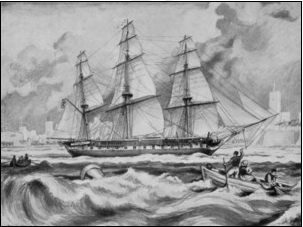
Cockburn's flagship HMS Vernon

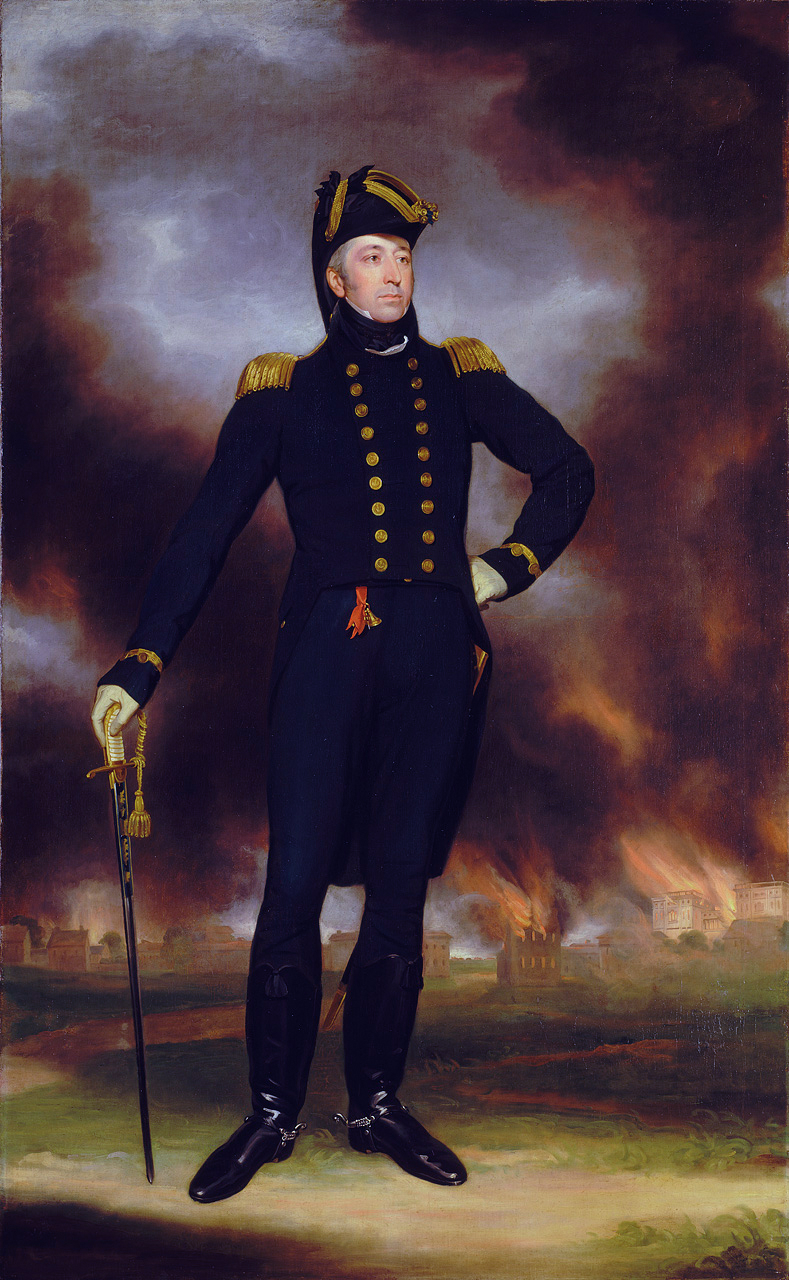
Sir George Cockburn, 10th Baronet; served at Halifax (1832–1836)

=== Crew of HMS Melville (1837) ===
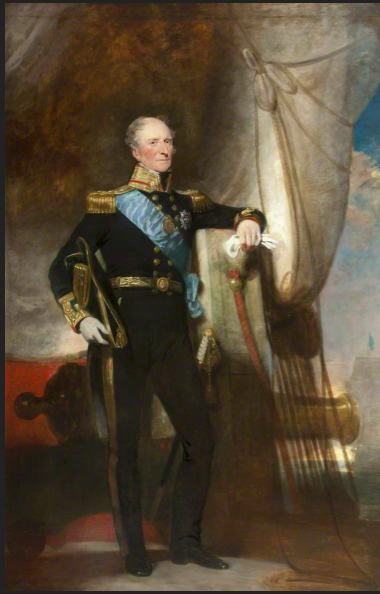
Sir Peter Halkett

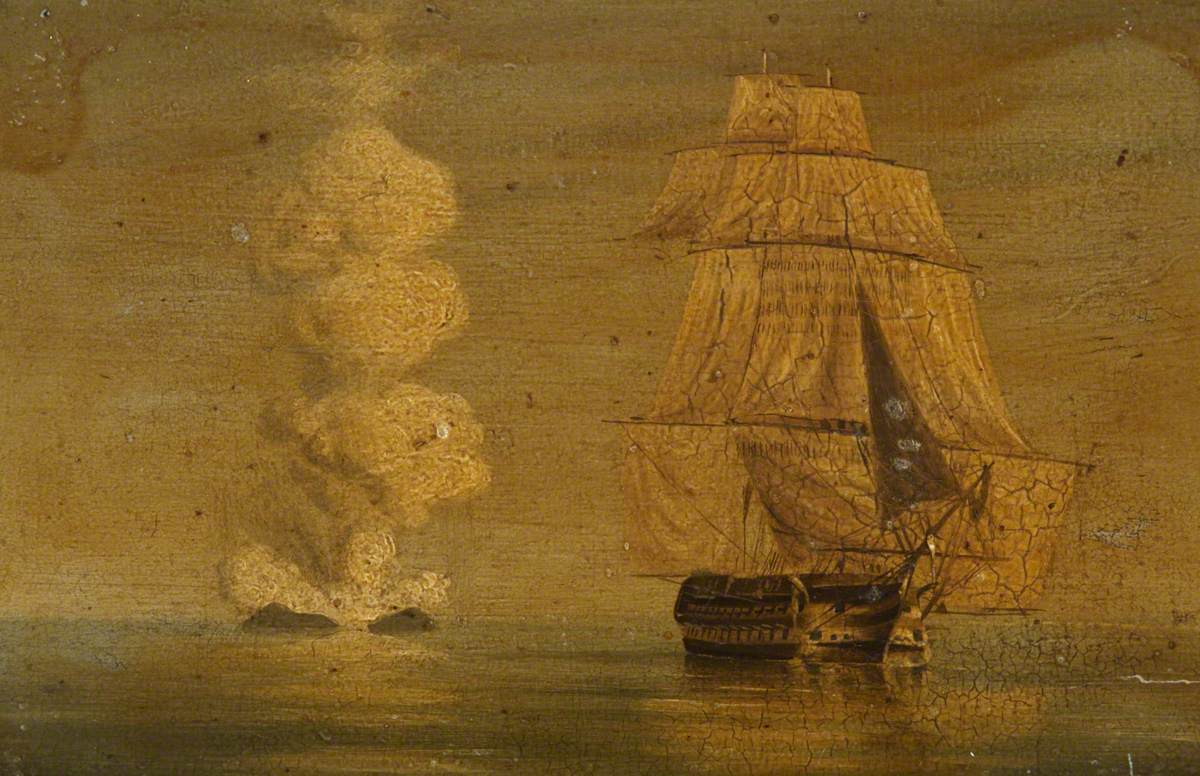
HMS Melville (1837)

=== Crew of HMS Vindictive (1845) ===
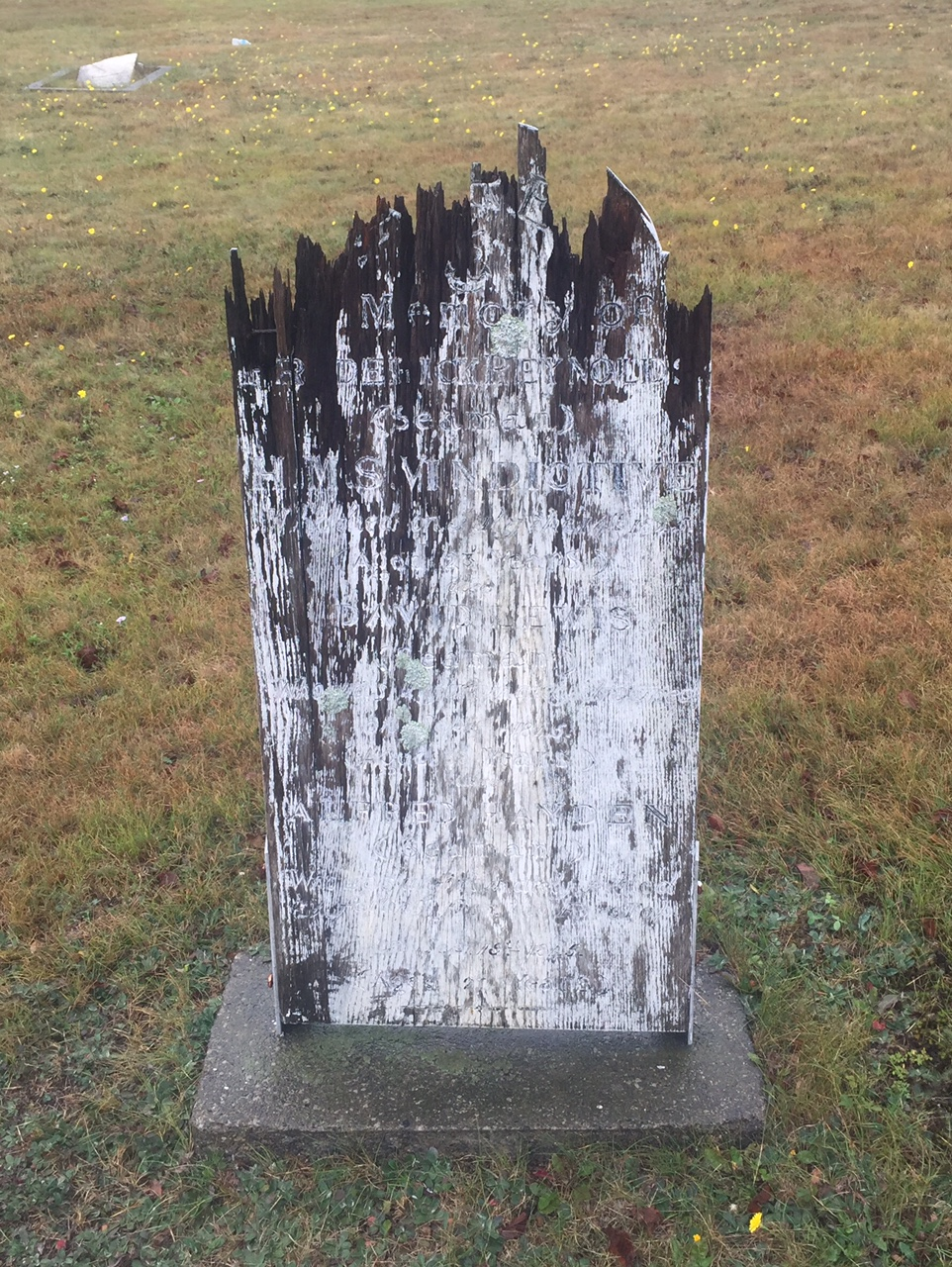
HMS Vindictive – four died (1846) (Note: Two stones; four crew (1845, 1846))

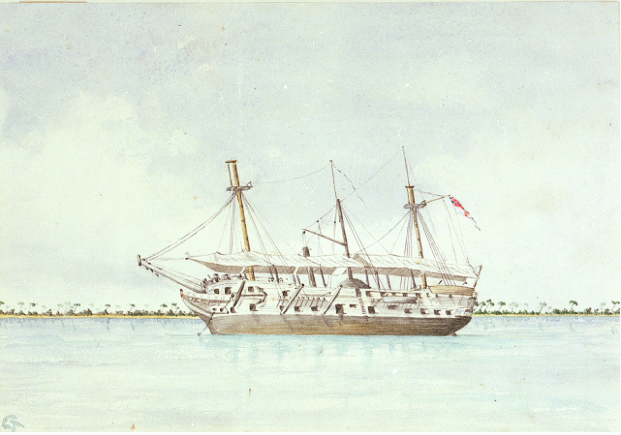
HMS Vindictive

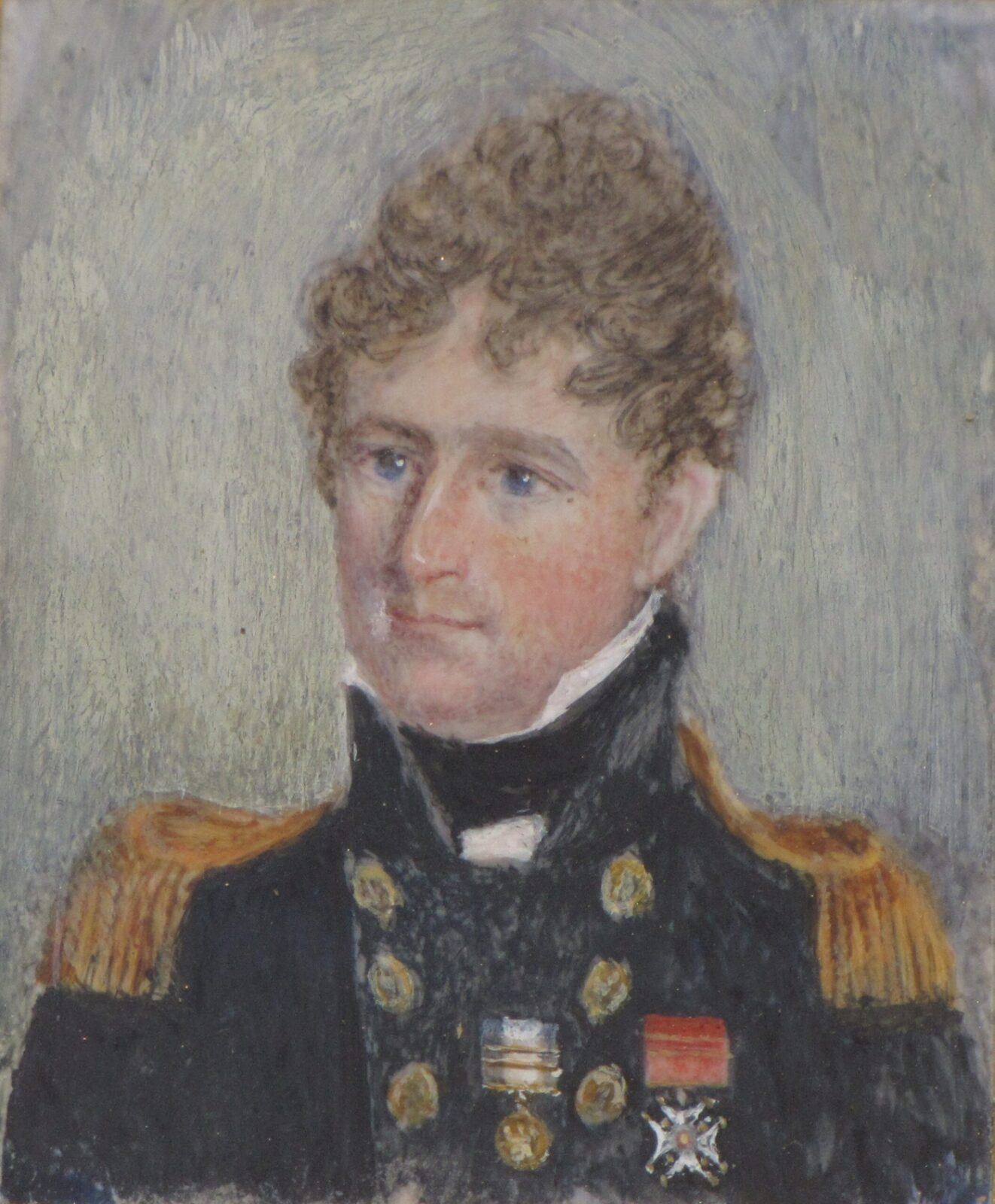
Francis Austen, brother of Jane Austen; served in Halifax (1844–1848)

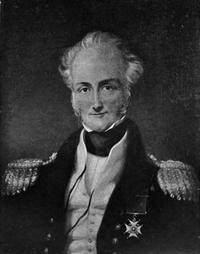
Captain Charles Austen, commanded flagship HMS Winchester in Halifax (1828–1830) (Jane Austen's brother)

=== Crew of HMS Wellesley (1850) ===
There is a monument to eleven crew that died over a two-year period on HMS Wellesley at Halifax (1848–1850). The ship was commanded by Captain George Goldsmith and was the flagship of Vice-Admiral Thomas Cochrane, 10th Earl of Dundonald, North America and West Indies Station.

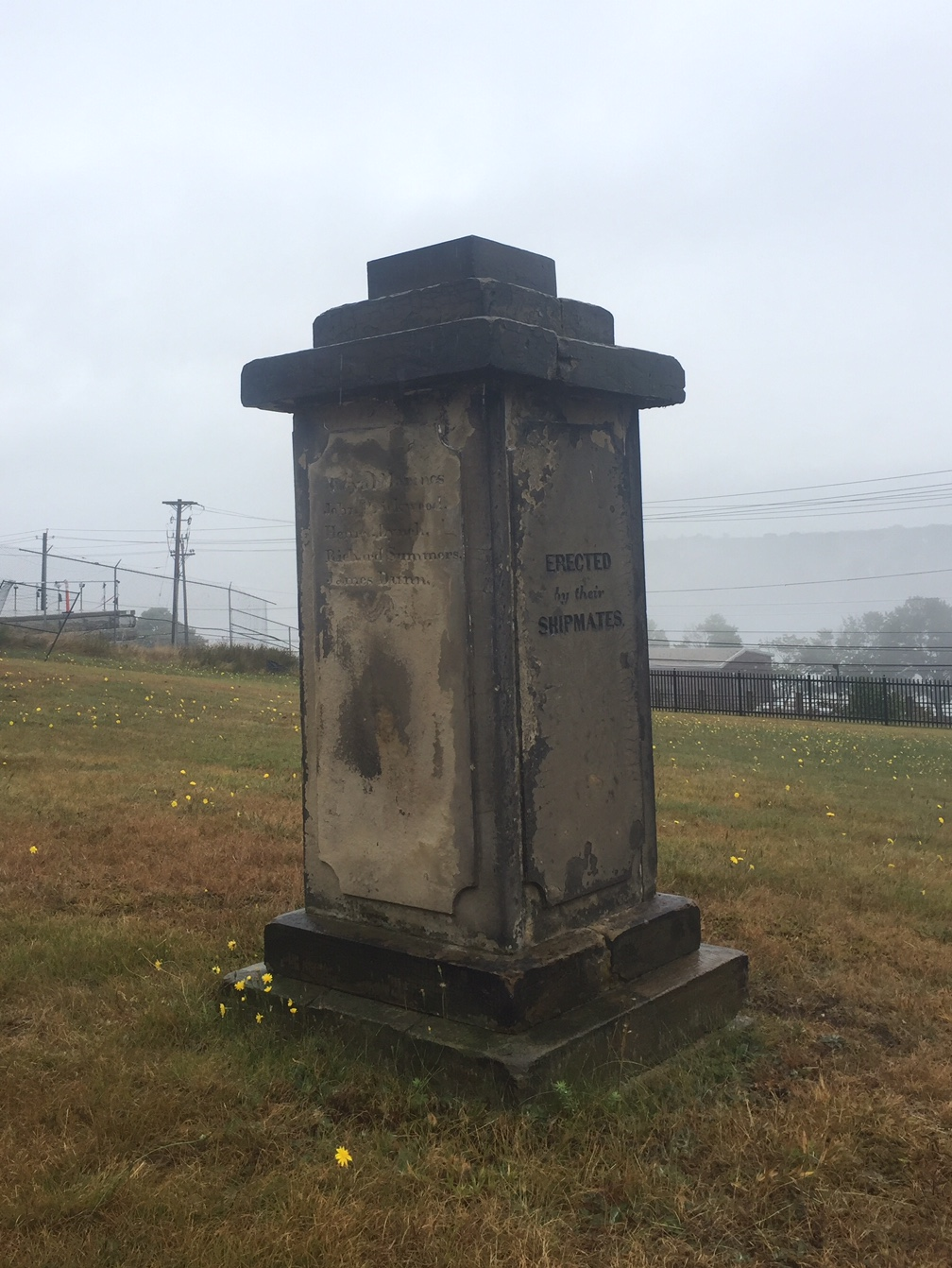
HMS Wellesley – eleven died (1850)

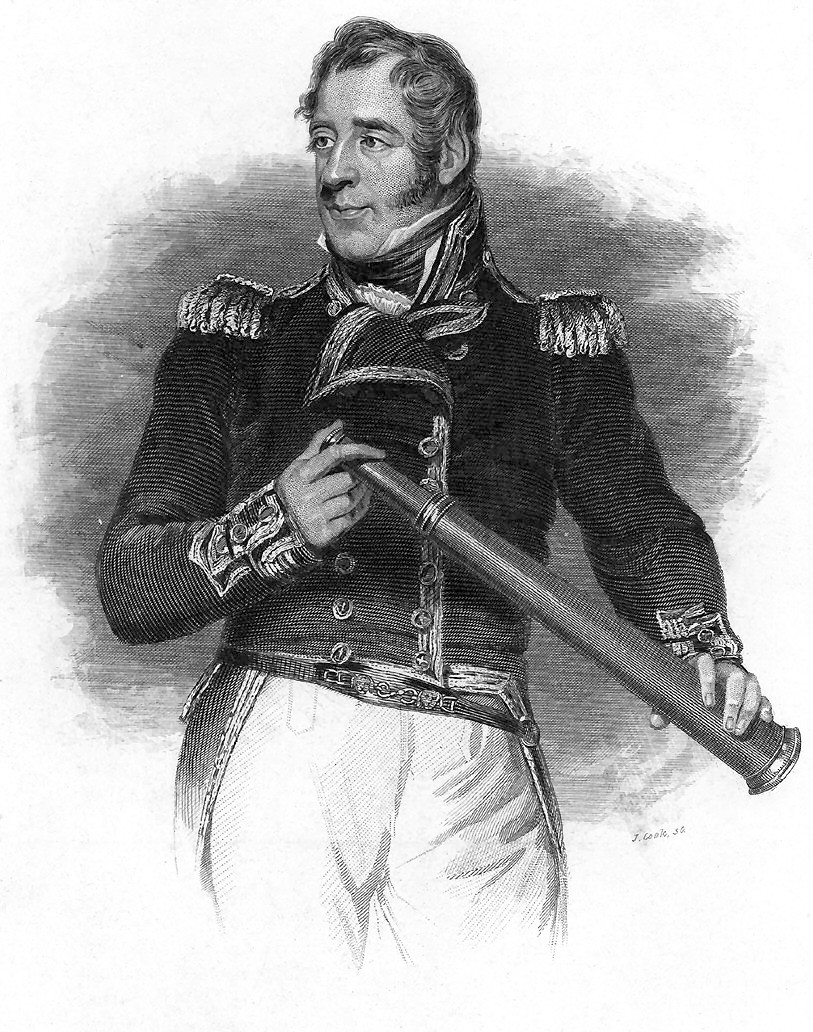
Thomas Cochrane

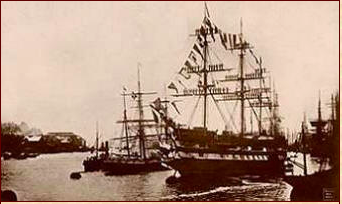
HMS Wellesley

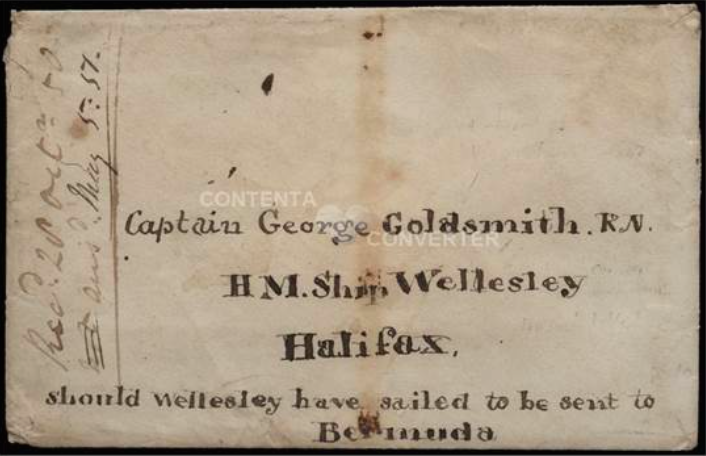
"Captain George Goldsmith RN, H.M. Ship Wellesley, Halifax", July 1850

=== Crew of HMS Cumberland (1852) ===
There is also a monument to six crew who died on the flagship HMS Cumberland from 1851 to 1852. The commander was Captain George Henry Seymour, and his father was the Vice Admiral Sir George Francis Seymour.

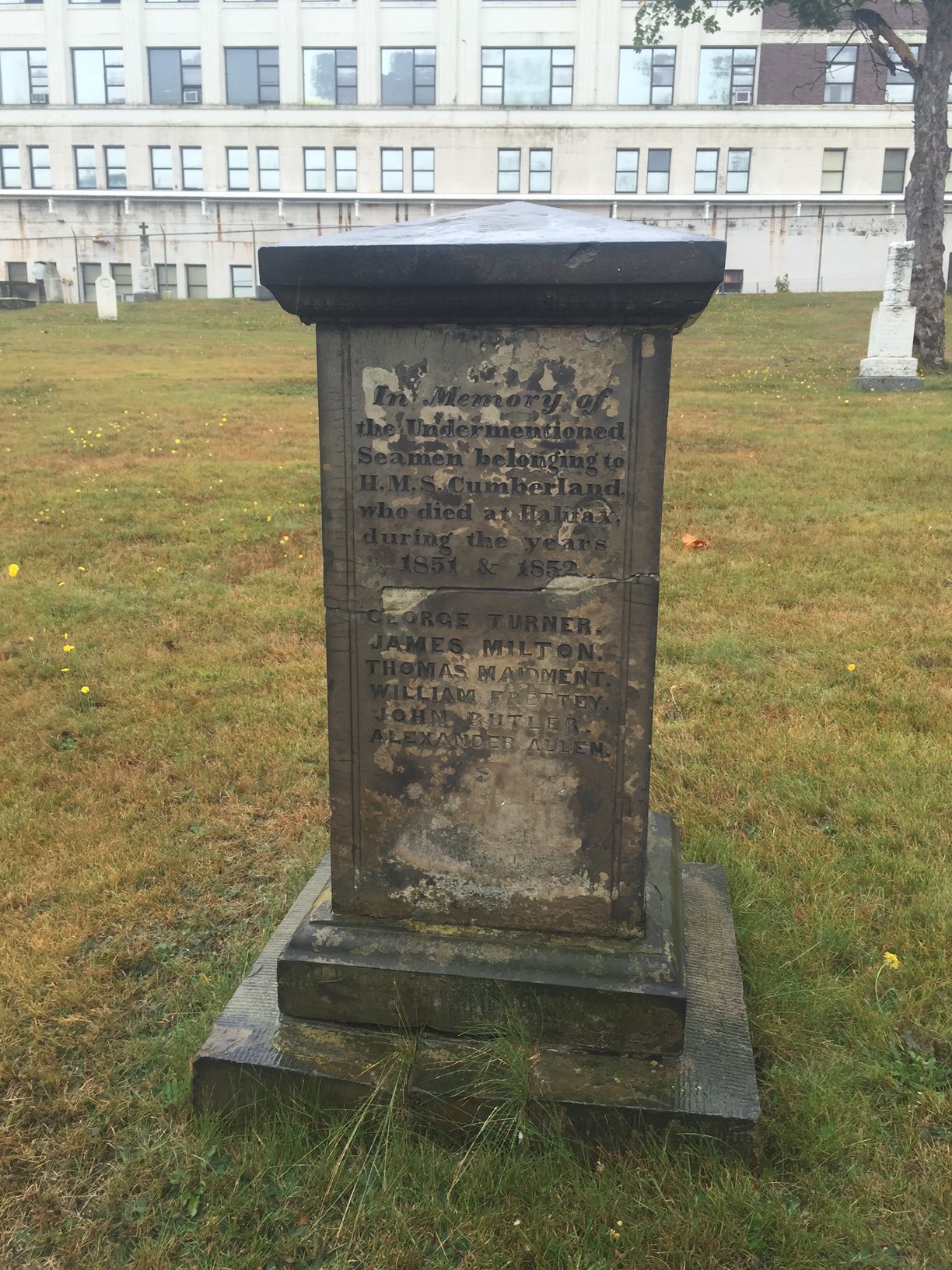
HMS Cumberland – six died (1852)

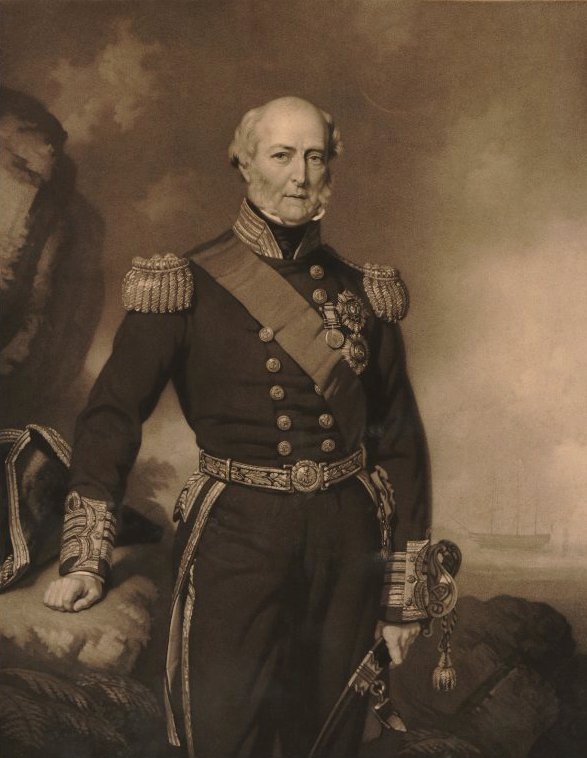
Sir George Francis Seymour

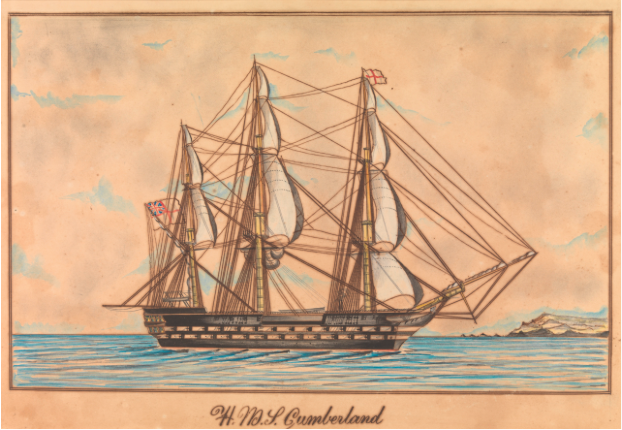
HMS Cumberland, c. 1852

=== Crew of HMS Indus (1859) ===
The crew and officers of HMS Indus created a gravestone for one of their fellow crew members who died in 1859. The vessel was the flagship of Sir Houston Stewart, Vice-Admiral of the Blue. The commander was Captain William King-Hall.

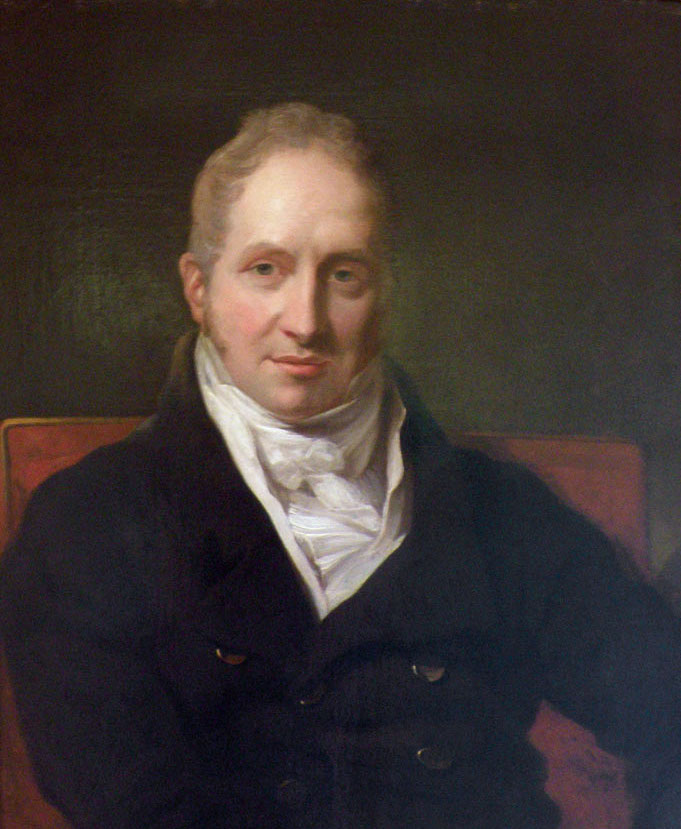
Sir Houston Stewart

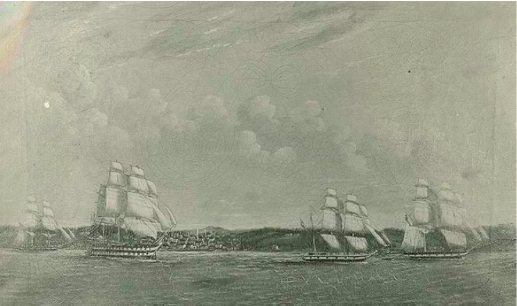
One died – HMS Indus and Squadron leaving Halifax Harbour, 1858

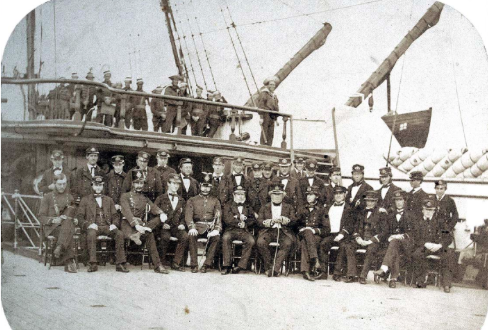
Captain William King-Hall and crew, HMS Indus, Halifax, Nova Scotia, 1860

=== Crew of HMS Nile (1861) ===
Admiral of the Fleet Sir Alexander Milne (Commander-in-Chief, North American Station at Halifax, 1860–64) erected a monument to his son and 14 other crew members who died over a period of 18 months on his flagship HMS Nile (1861). (Note: Commander of HMS Nile Captain Edward King Barnard (b. 1815, later Rear-Admiral) also was involved in erecting the monument.) The Admiral's son was one of six who died in one week. Two more died within the month. (Note: There is another stone that commemorates a single crew member. No date.)

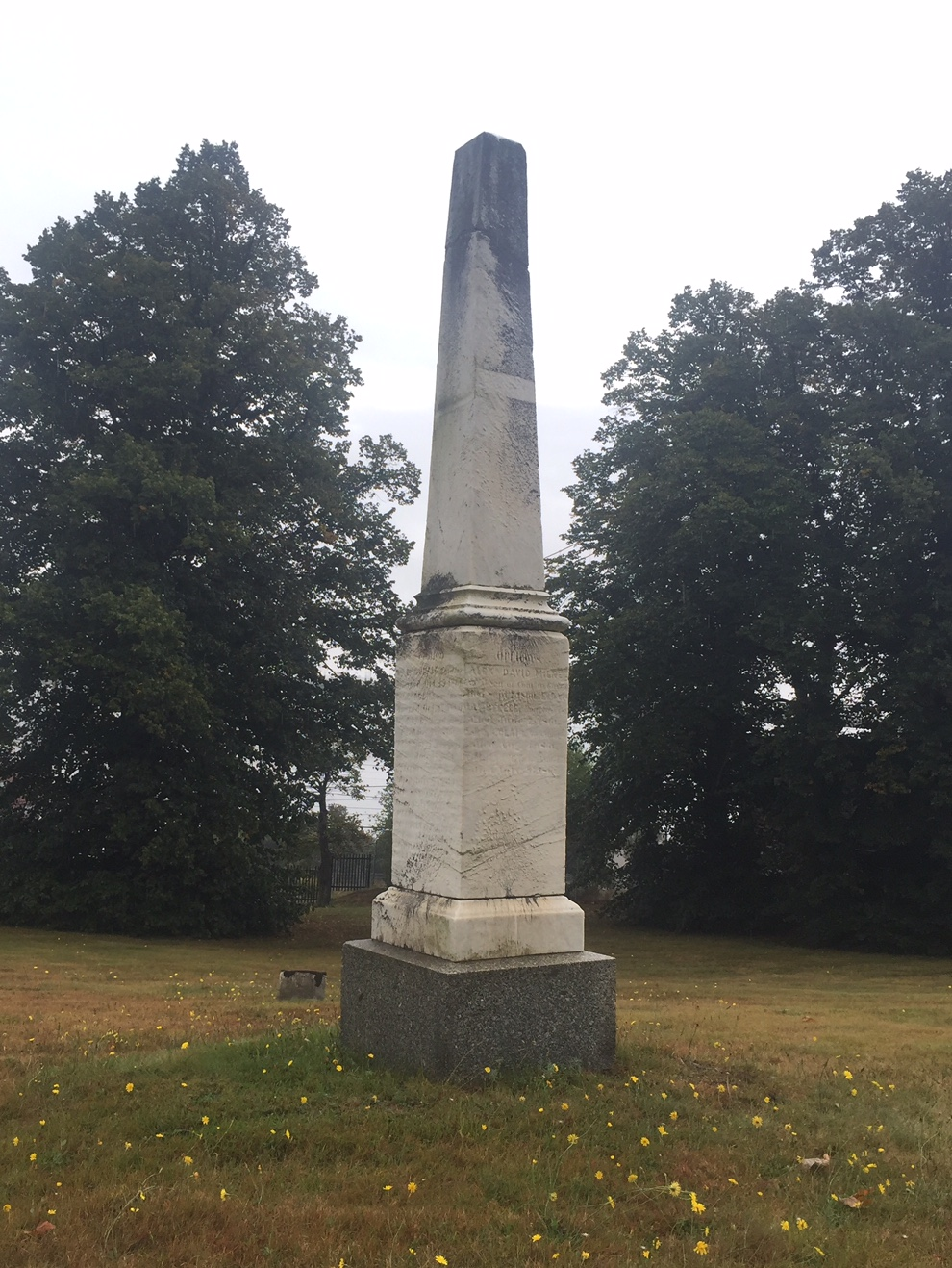
HMS Nile Monument – 16 died (1861)

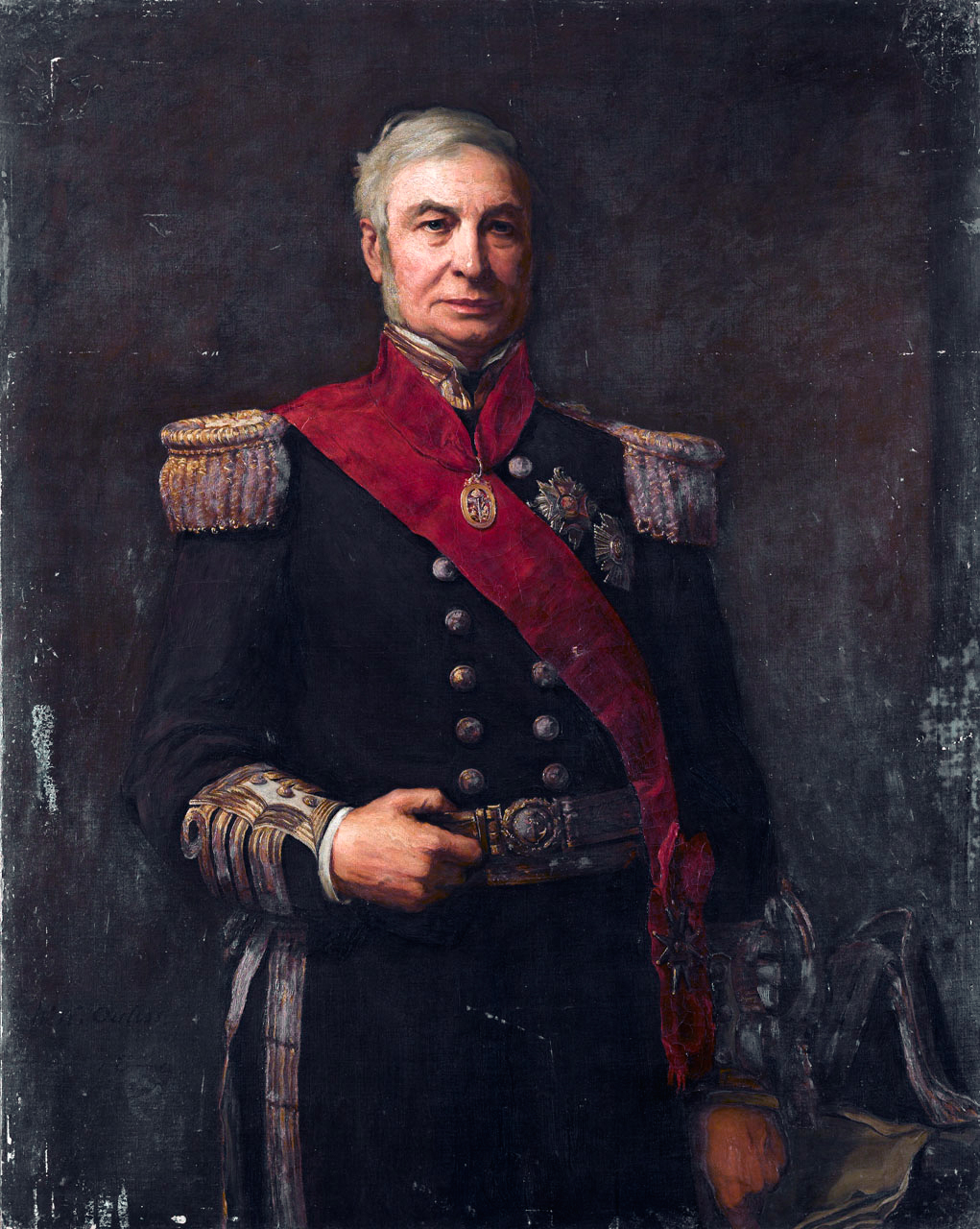
Admiral Milne – buried his son

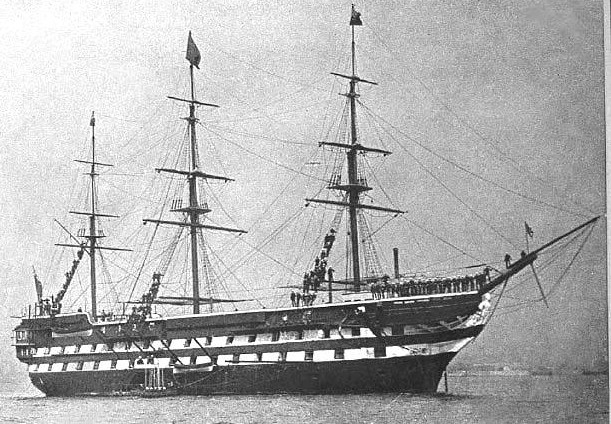
HMS Nile

=== Crew of HMS Duncan (1866) ===
The shipmates/messmates of HMS Duncan erected four stones for five crew (8 September 1864, 1865, 1865, 1866). 6 January 1864: Commanded by Captain Robert Gibson, flagship of Vice-Admiral James Hope, North America and West Indies. Whilst serving on the North America and West Indies Station, Captain John Bythesea VC was carried on the books of Duncan as second captain from 1 April 1866 to Spring 1867, for special service as Naval Attaché in Washington.

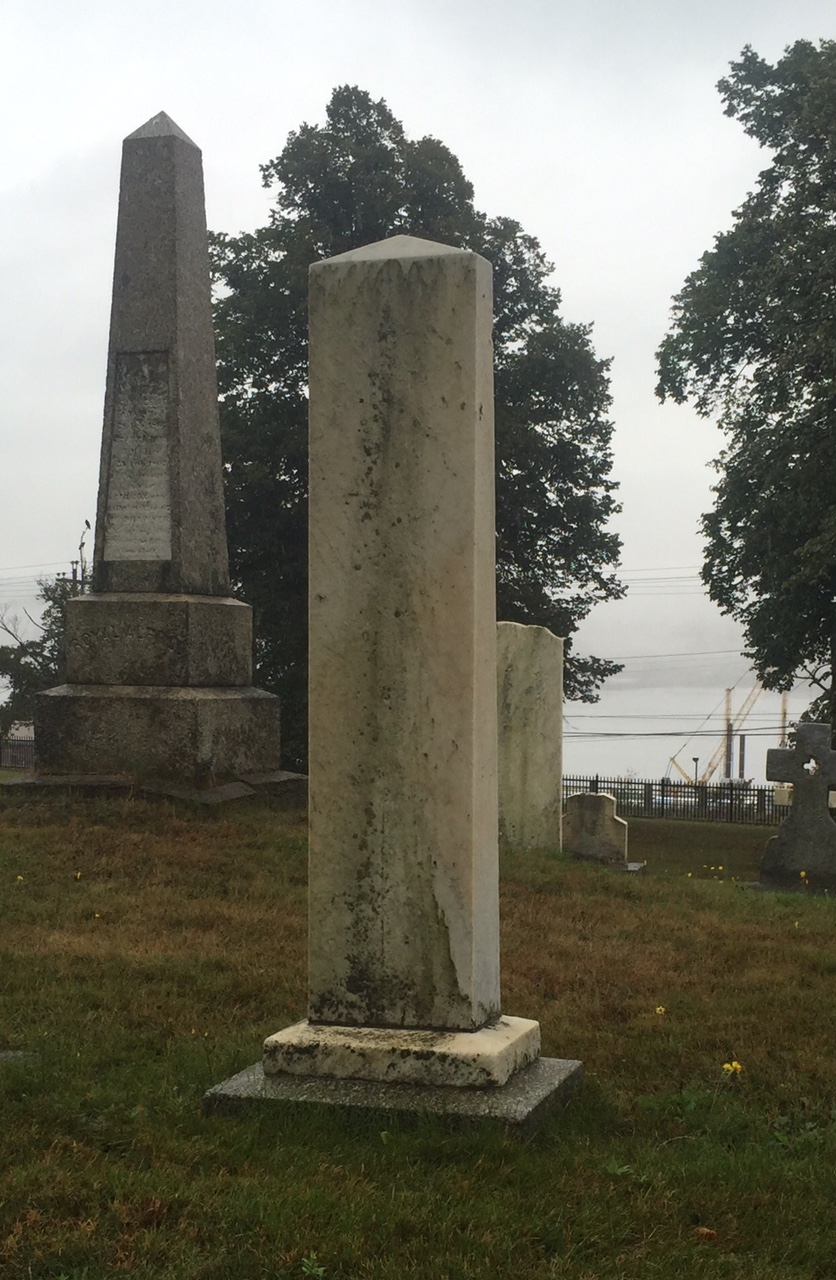
HMS Duncan – five died (1866)

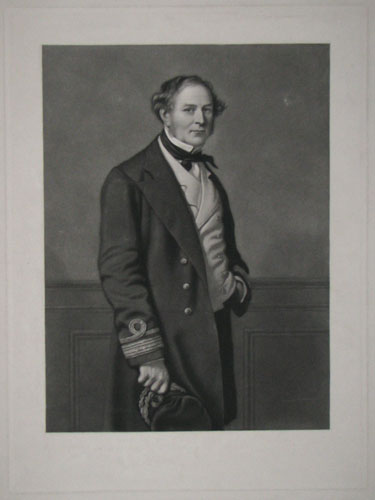
Sir James Hope

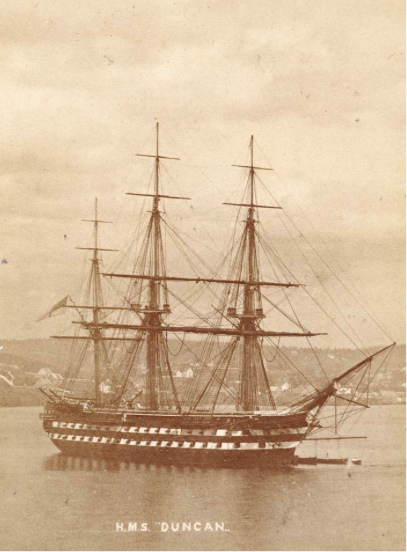
HMS Duncan, Halifax, Nova Scotia, c. 1865

=== Crew of HMS Royal Alfred (1869) ===
In 1869, a monument to the four crew that died aboard flagship HMS Royal Alfred was created by Admiral of the Fleet Rodney Mundy (Commander-in-Chief, North American Station). (Note: Note: Grave marker for Henry Smith Coolen (marker No. 15) indicates the date Nov. 18, 1862, which does not coincide with the dates HMS Royal Alfred was sailing.) The crew of HMS Royal Alfred have the most markers in the burying ground. There are seven gravestones for ten people. The last grave marker was for the infant daughter of the surgeon on board ship. The Royal Alfred was the flagship of Vice-Admiral Sir George Rodney Mundy, 1867–1869.

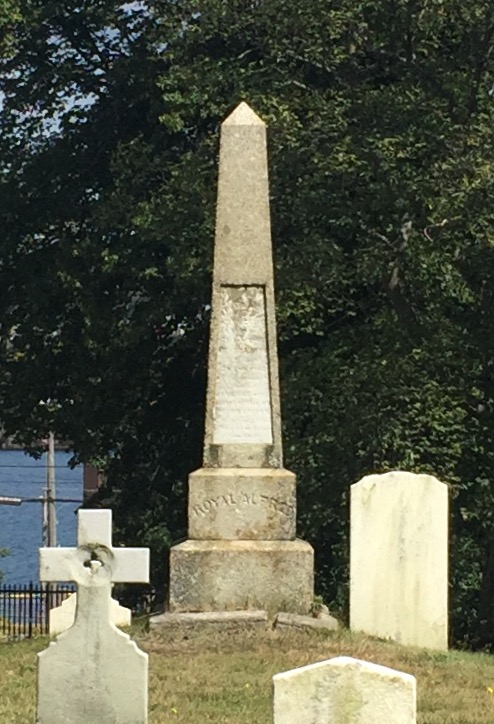
HMS Royal Albert – ten died (1869)

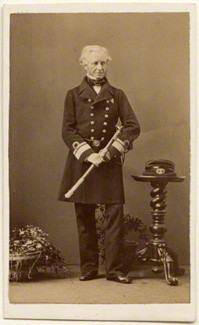
Sir Rodney Mundy

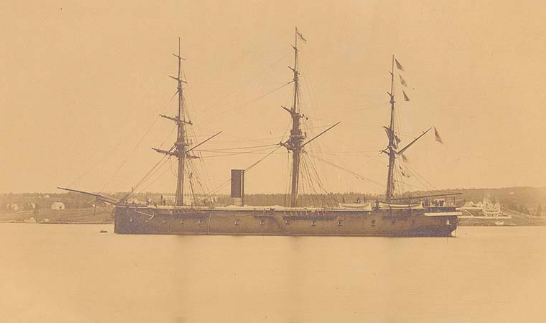
HMS Royal Alfred, Halifax Harbour, Nova Scotia, ca. 1870

== Officers ==
There are only two stones that mark the graves of officers. The identity of the admiral has never been confirmed.

- Admiral Domes (Barnes? Tomes?) drowned while posted on the flagship HMS Renown (–1898). (Note: Died while on board Renown, August 4, 1898. HMS Renown, Flagship of the North America and West Indies Station, under the command of Admiral Sir John A. Fisher, Captain Daniel M. Riddel while in Halifax, 1897–1899. Given the lack of formality of the gravestone, one might conclude that "Admiral Tomes" was a nickname for a crew member rather than an actual admiral.)
- Captain George Oliver Evans, (–1868) Capt., Royal Marines Light Infantry, 6 June 1868, 36 years. Captain Evans fought in both the Crimean War (Balaclava, Sevastopol, Kinburn), as well as the Second Opium War (Canton). He served as the aide-de-camp to Sir Thomas Holloway (1858–60).
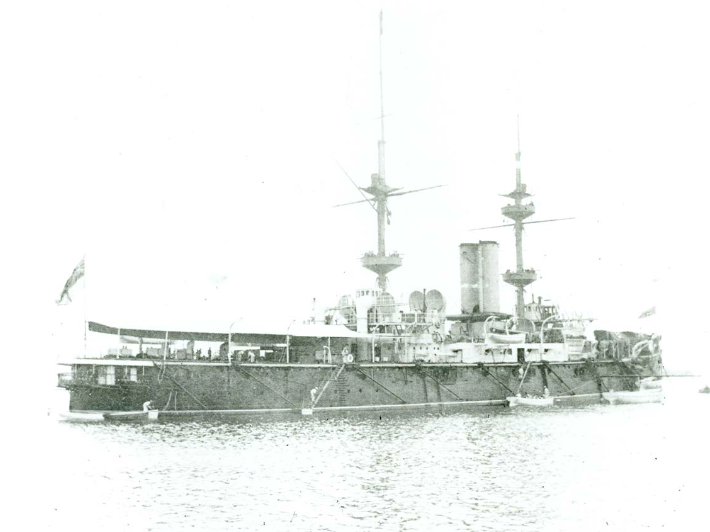
HMS Renown, Halifax, Nova Scotia (1898)

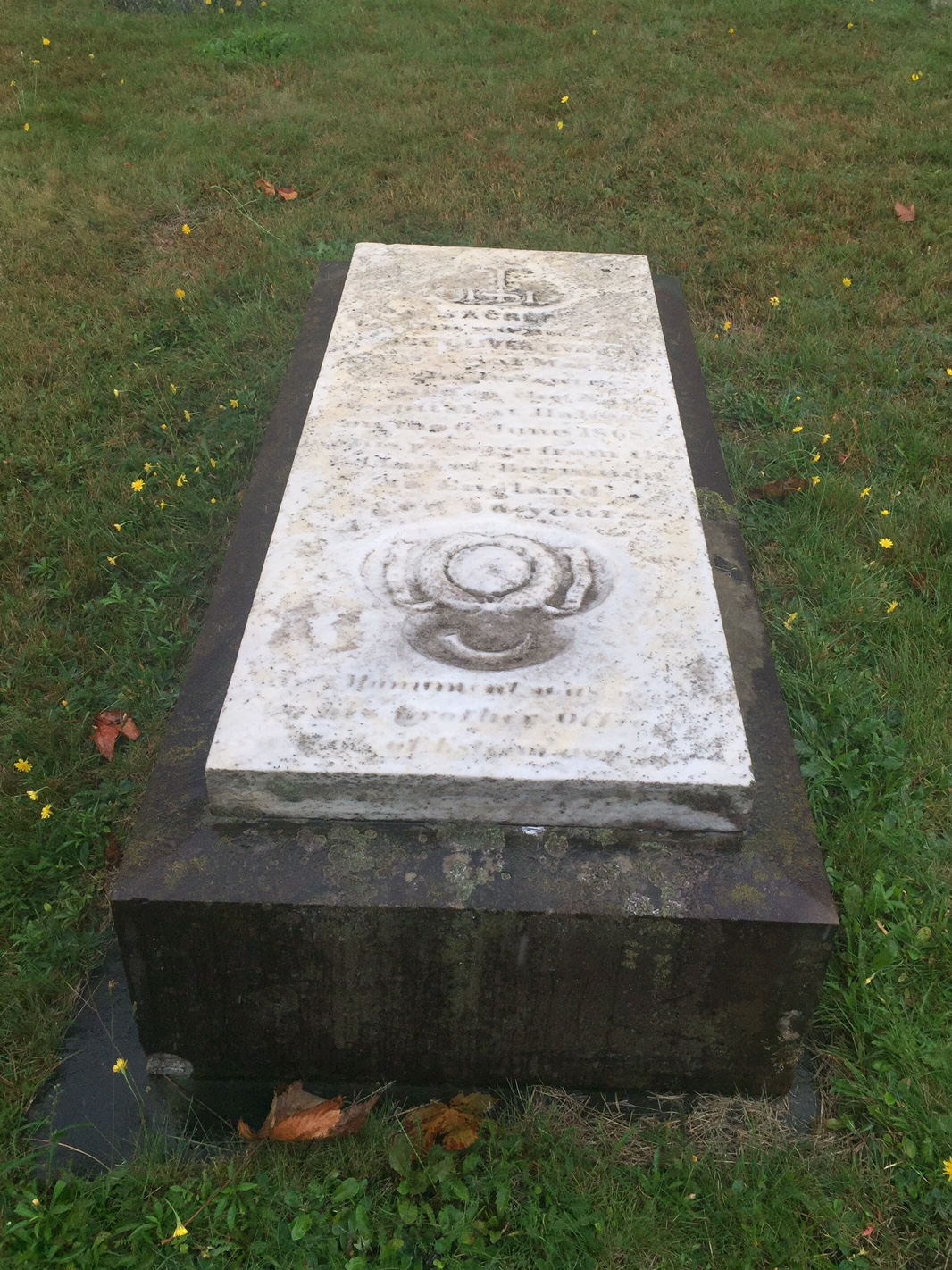
Captain George Oliver Evans (1868)

== Other ==
=== Individual crew members ===
Listed below are the ships that were not flagships and whose crews commemorated the loss of a single sailor with a gravestone:

- HMS Vernon (1808); HMS Mersey (1820); HMS Alligator (1827); HMS Columbus (1837); HBM Sloop Pilot (1841); HMS Sydenham (1843); HMS Scourge (1848); HMS Edgar (1862); HMS Medea (1865); HMS Doris (1868); HMS Constance (1868); HMS Valorous; HMS Racoon (1874).
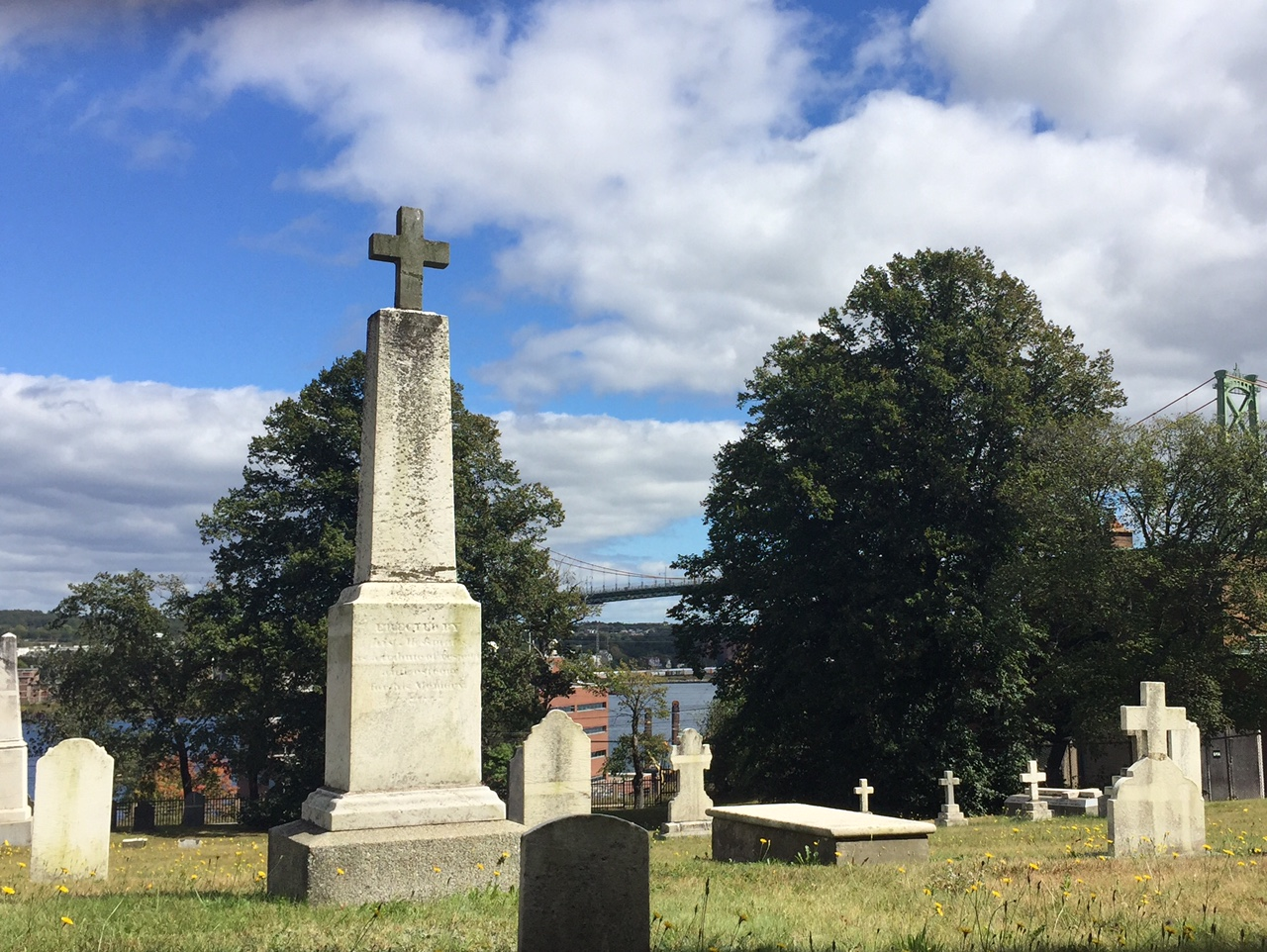
HMS Galatea, 1865 (left of center) (Note: In memory of Alexander F. Carroll Royal Navy who died on board H.M.S. Galatea at Halifax, Nova Scotia June 17th 1865 aged 18 years.)

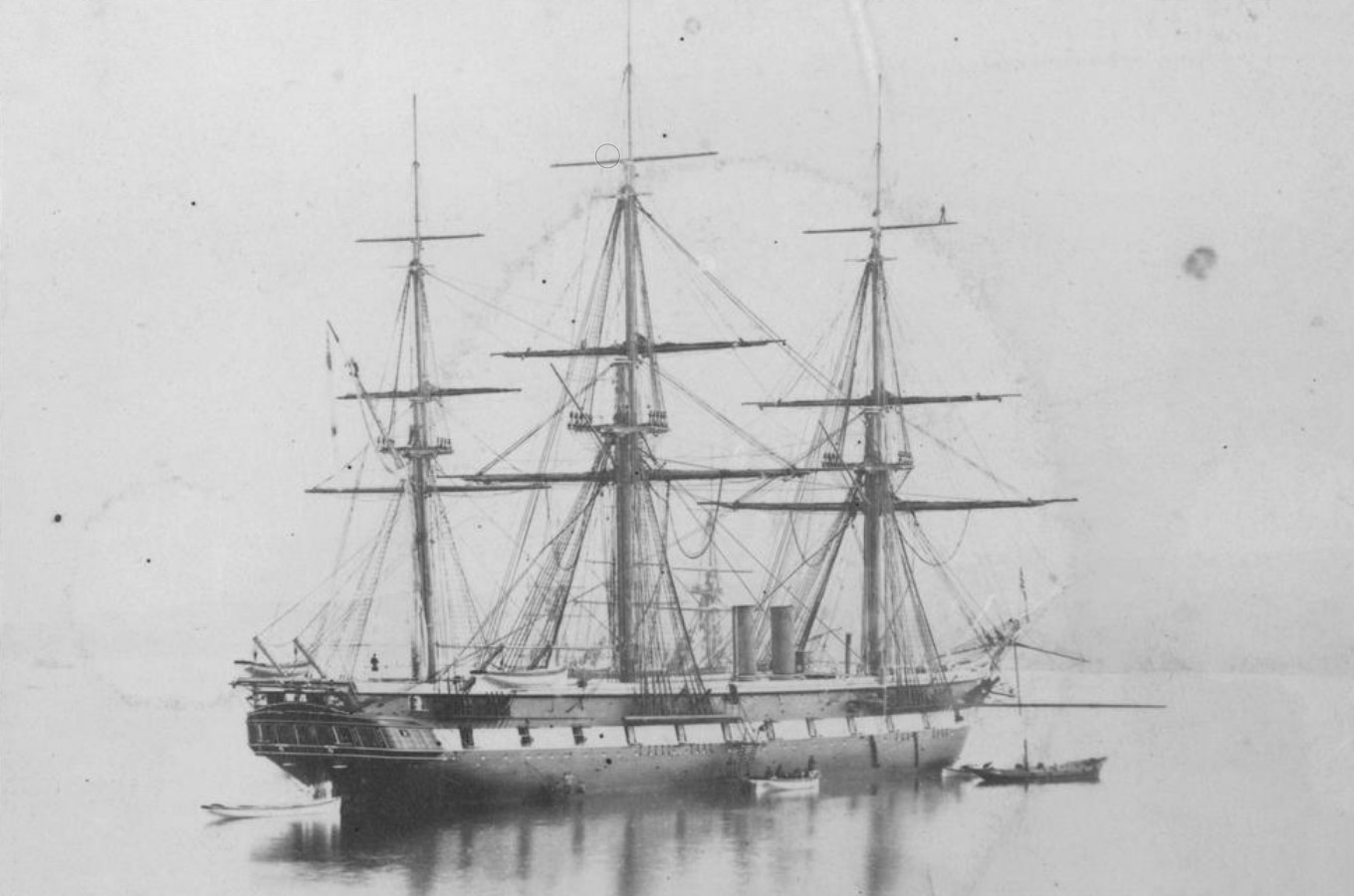
HMS Galatea, Halifax, Nova Scotia, c.1868.

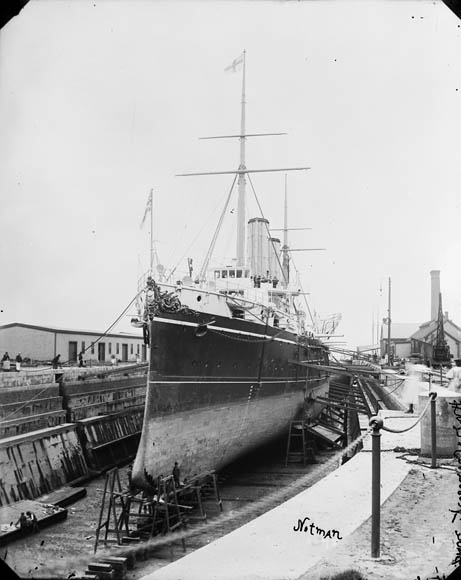
HMS Crescent, Halifax, Nova Scotia (1885)

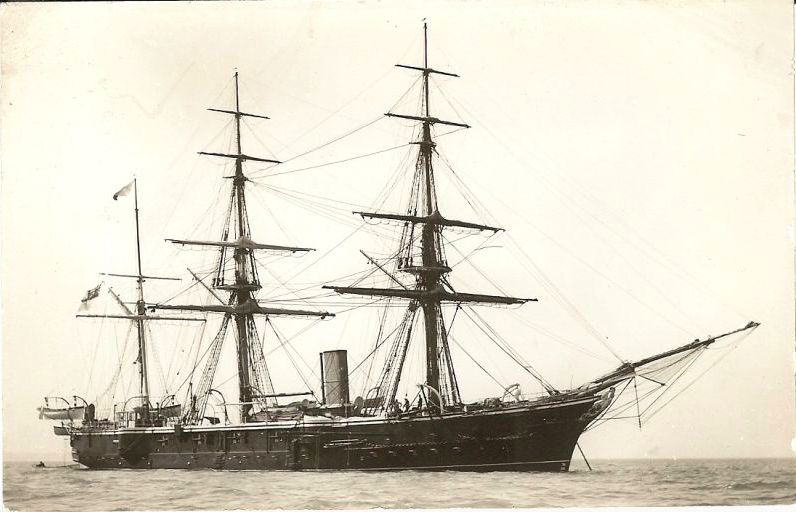
HMS Tourmaline (1888)

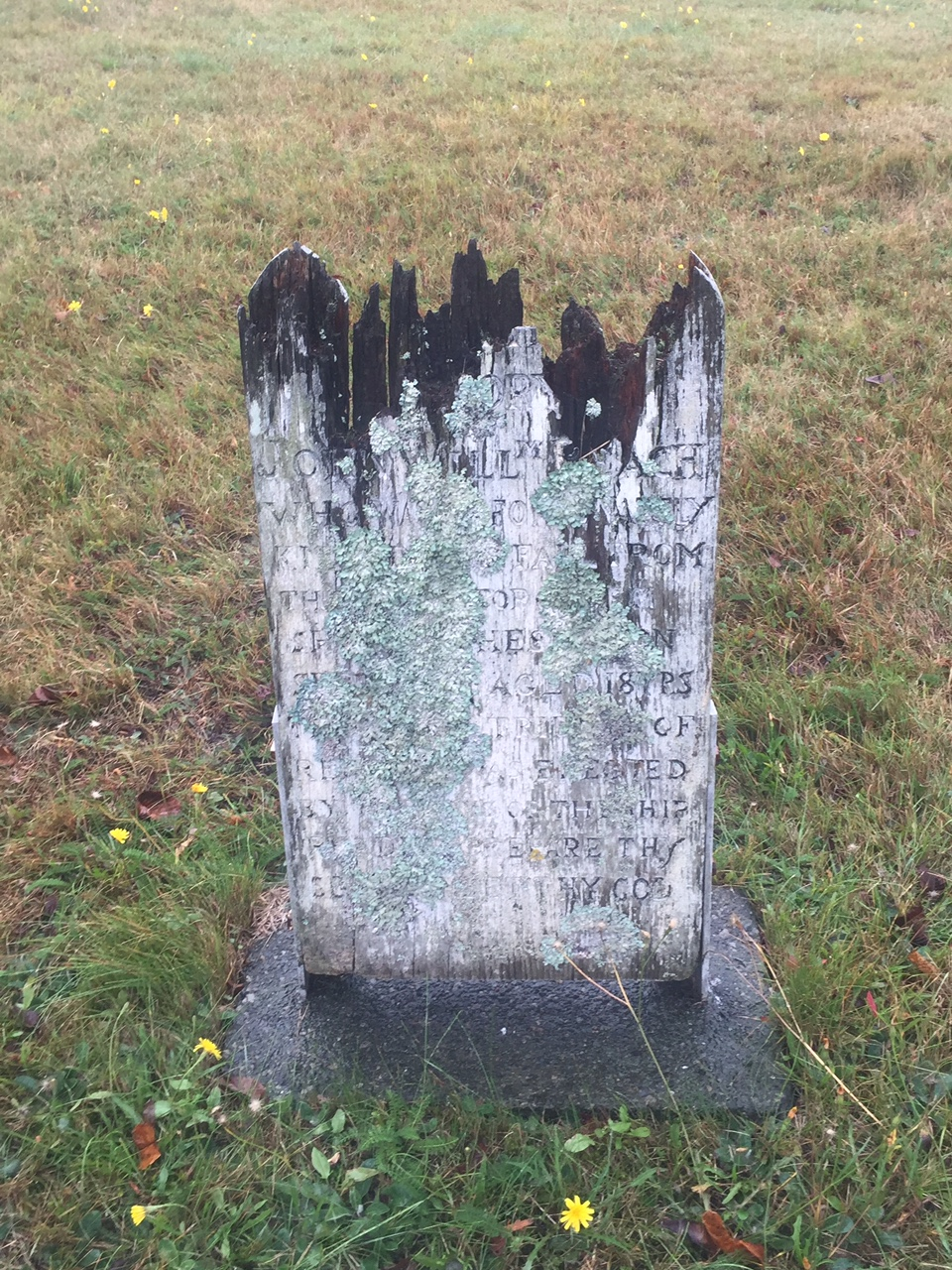
HMS Winchester (1841)

=== Multiple crew members ===
The following four ships were not flagships and had multiple deaths while at the Halifax station, which the crews commemorated by a single monument.

- Six died – HMS Orion, 1857 – Halifax, July 27–August 5, 1857, Captain John Elphinstone Erskine
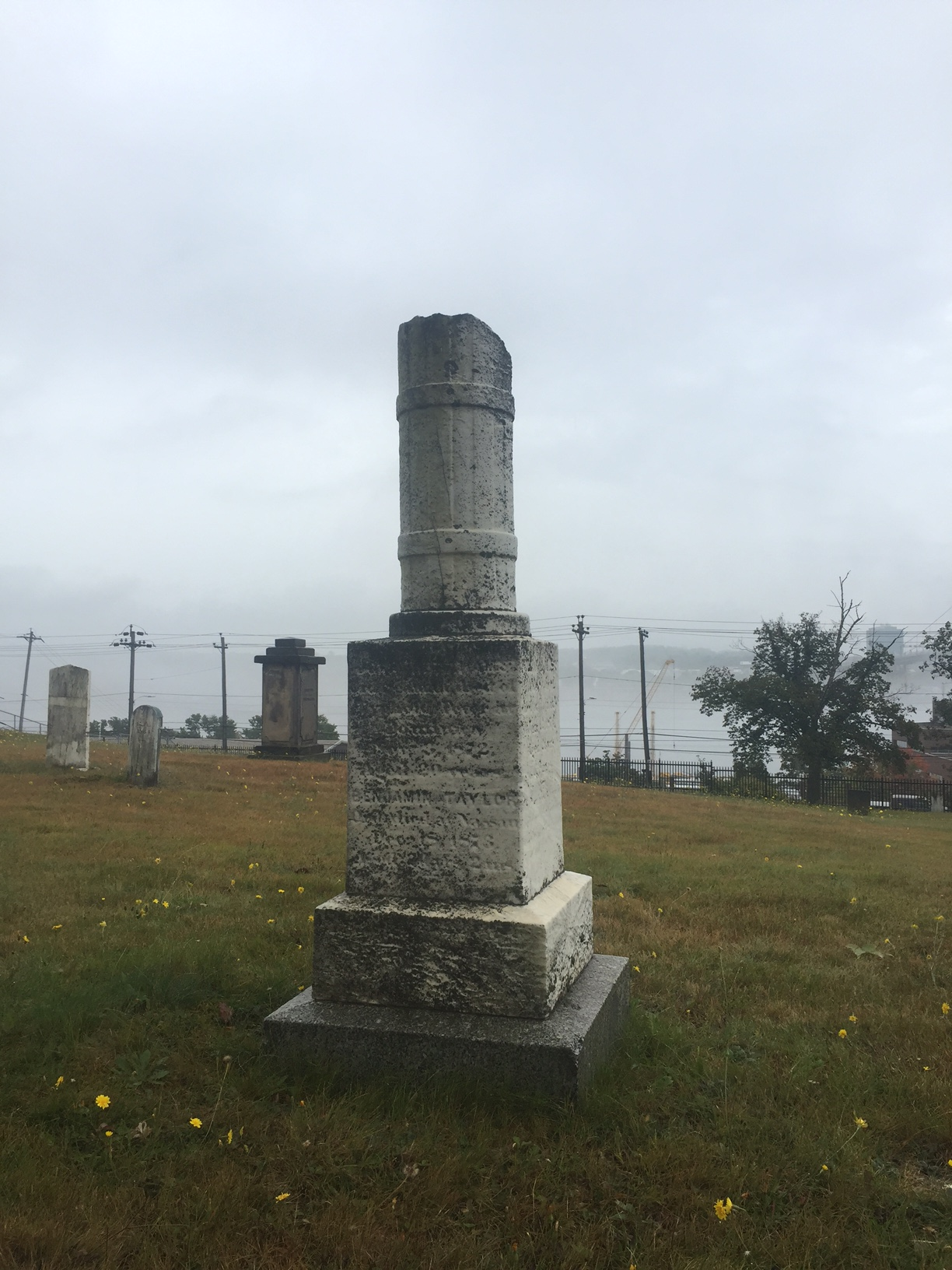
HMS Sphinx – five died (1874) (Note: HMS Sphinx stone erected by Capt. Thomas Barnardiston; buried at sea because of yellow fever (1874). Note the dates of the grave markers do not coincide with the dates HMS Sphinx was sailing.)

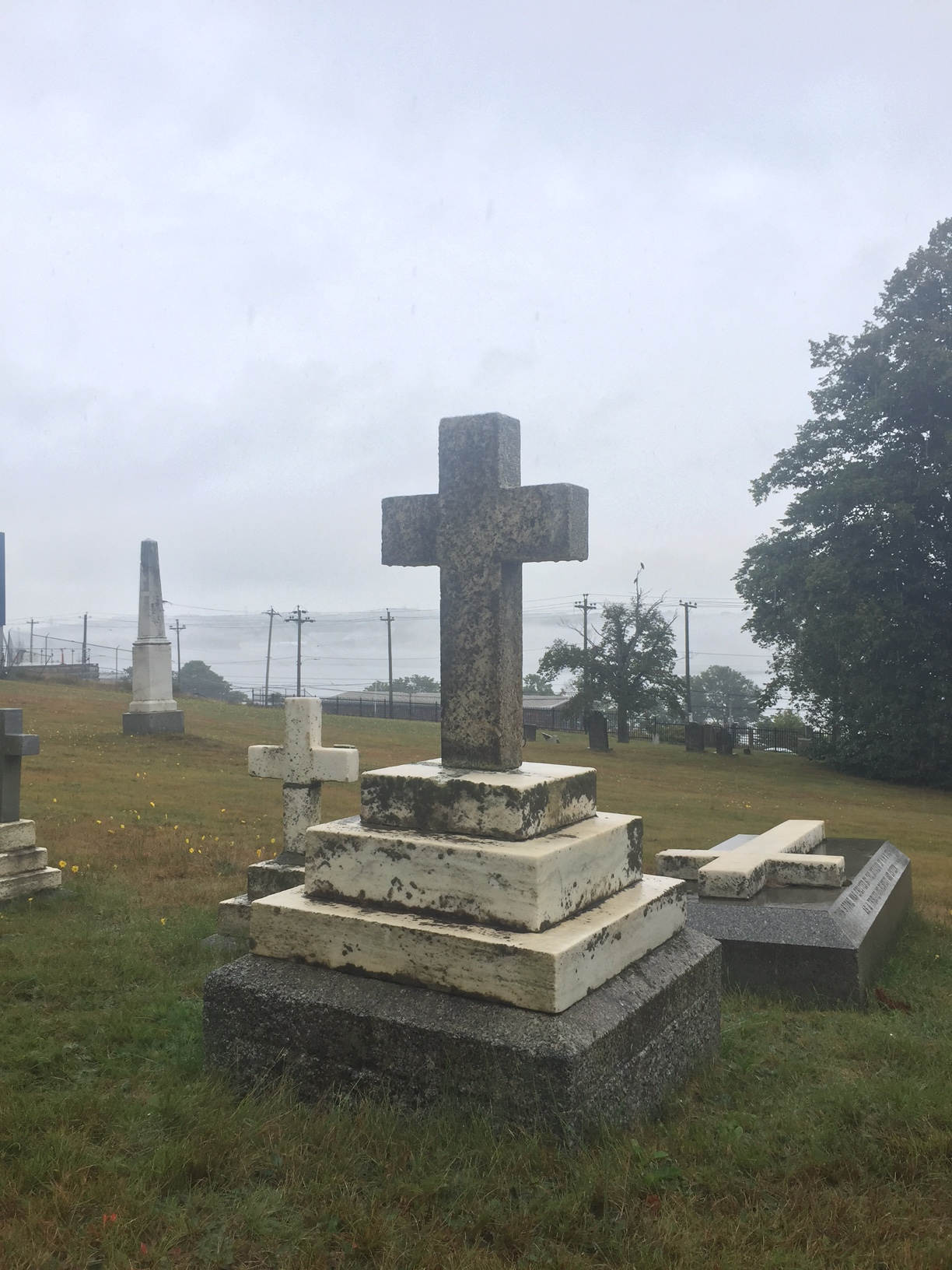
HMS Canada – three died (1887)

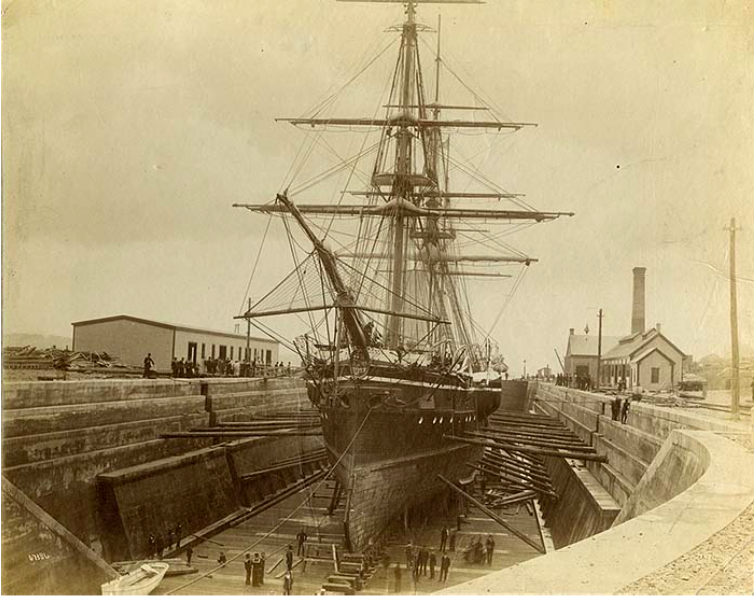
HMS Canada, Halifax, Nova Scotia, 1889

== Women and children ==
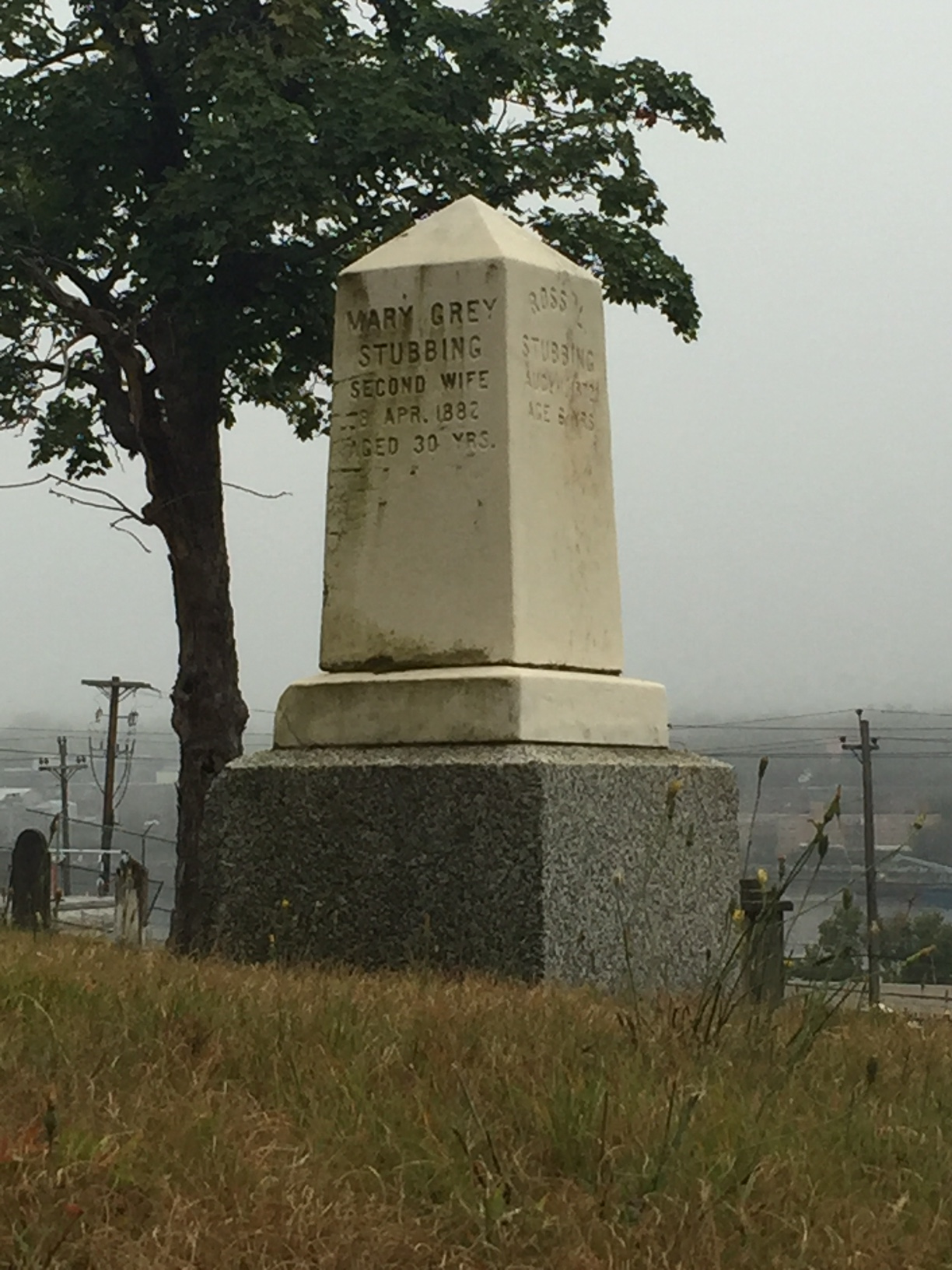
Family of Charles Stubbing, Admiralty Clerk (1882)

There are also grave stones for women (9) and children (18). Many of the children were infants. The most prominent of these grave markers was erected by Charles Stubbing who was the Admiralty Clerk between 1867 and 1893. He created a grave stone that lists his first and second wife and five of his children. He lost two of his children and his second wife in the same year (1882). He created another gravestone for the loss of his third wife.

== War of 1812 ==
During the War of 1812, 220 British naval sailors died in the Naval Hospital at Halifax. The most famous of these were those that died as a result of the battle between USS Chesapeake and HMS Shannon. The marker for the Shannon was created in 1868, while the marker for the Chesapeake was created in 1966.

=== Crew of HMS Shannon (1813) ===
Admiral of the Fleet Rodney Mundy (Commander-in-Chief, North American Station) refurbished the original monument that was created for the seven who died in the Naval Hospital who served on HMS Shannon (1868).

Shannon's midshipmen during the action were Messrs. Smith, Leake, Clavering, Raymond, Littlejohn and Samwell. Samwell was the only other officer to be wounded in the action. Mr Etough was the acting master, and conned the ship into the action. Shortly after the frigate had been secured, Broke fainted from loss of blood and was rowed back to Shannon to be attended to by the ship's surgeon. After the victory, a prize crew was put aboard Chesapeake and Shannon escorted her and her crew into Halifax, arriving there on 6 June. Lieutenant Bartholomew Kent, of Nova Scotia brought the first news of the British victory back to London.

At Halifax Chesapeake's crew was imprisoned. Chesapeake herself was repaired and taken into service by the Royal Navy before she was sold at Portsmouth, England in 1820 and broken up.

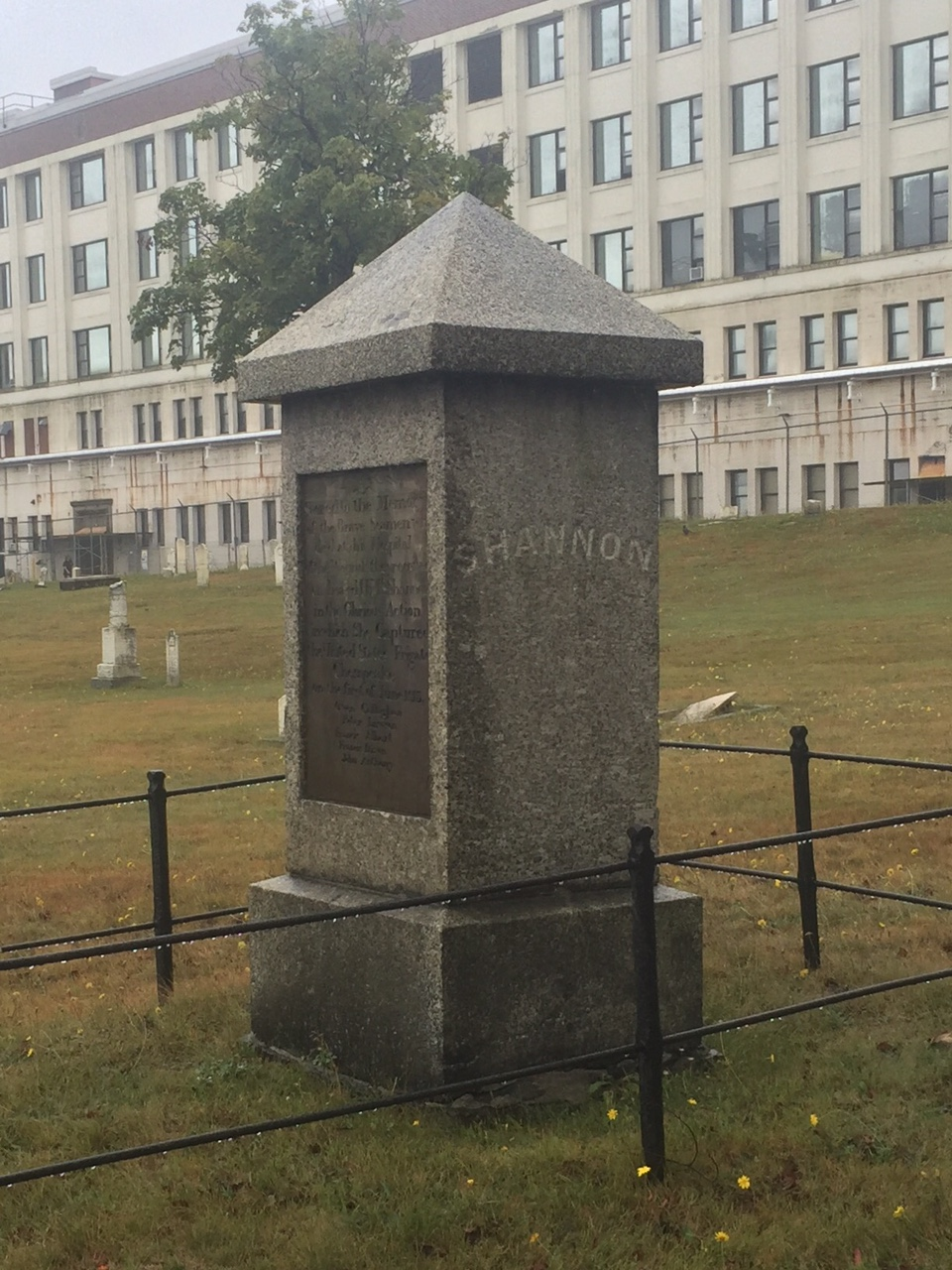
HMS Shannon – 7 died (1813)

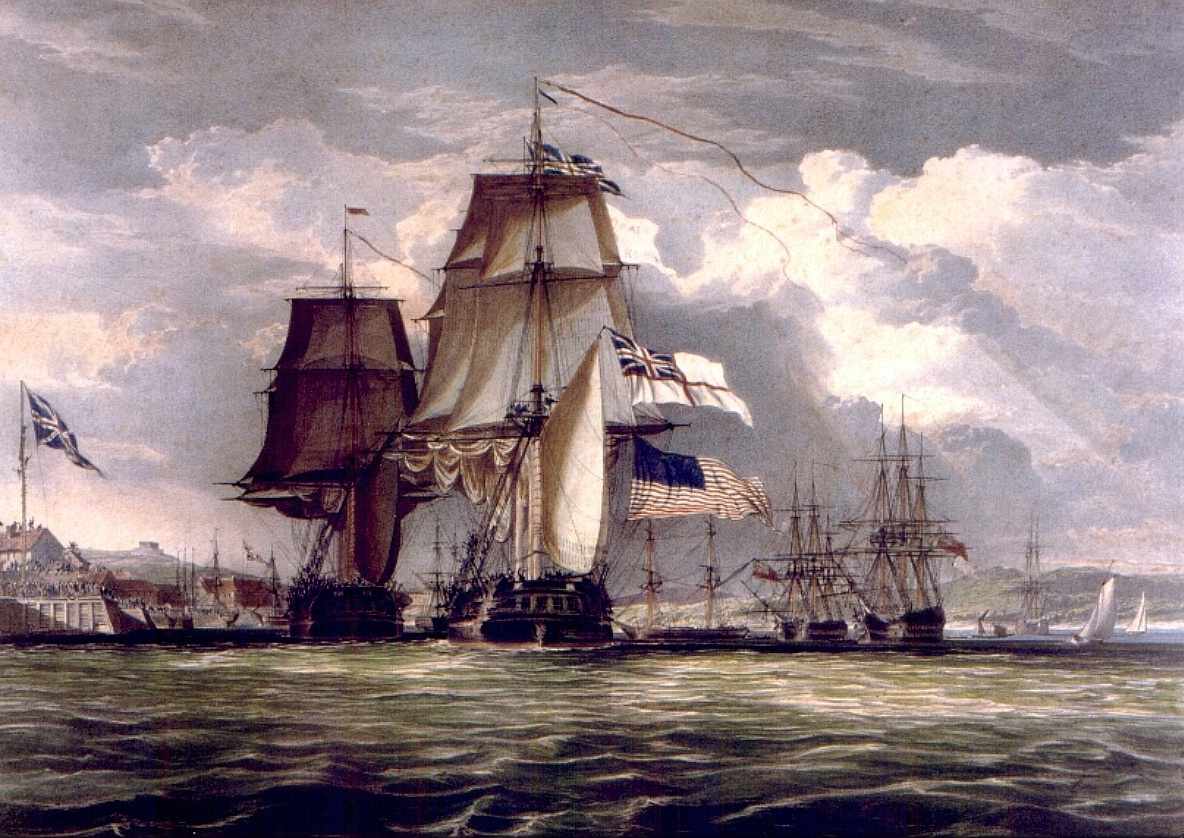
HMS Shannon leading USS Chesapeake into Halifax Harbour in June 1813, by John C. Schetky

=== Crew of USS Chesapeake (1813) ===
There was a monument erected to the twelve crewmen of USS Chesapeake who died in the Halifax Naval Hospital (1966).

Captain Philip Broke boarded Chesapeake at the head of a party of 20 men. They met little resistance from Chesapeake's crew, most of whom had run below deck. The only resistance from Chesapeake came from her contingent of marines. The British soon overwhelmed them; only nine escaped injury out of 44. Broke was severely injured in the fighting on the forecastle, being struck in the head with a sword. Soon after, Shannon's crew pulled down Chesapeake's flag. Only 15 minutes had elapsed from the first exchange of gunfire to the capture.

Reports on the number of killed and wounded aboard Chesapeake during the battle vary widely. Broke's after-action report from 6 July states 70 killed and 100 wounded. Contemporary sources place the number between 48 and 61 killed and 85–99 wounded. Discrepancies in the number of killed and wounded are possibly caused by the addition of sailors who died of their wounds in the ensuing days after the battle. The counts for Shannon have fewer discrepancies with 23 killed; 56 wounded. Despite his serious injuries, Broke ordered repairs to both ships and they proceeded on to Halifax, Nova Scotia. Captain James Lawrence died en route and was buried in Halifax with military honors. The British imprisoned his crew. Broke survived his wounds and was later made a baronet.

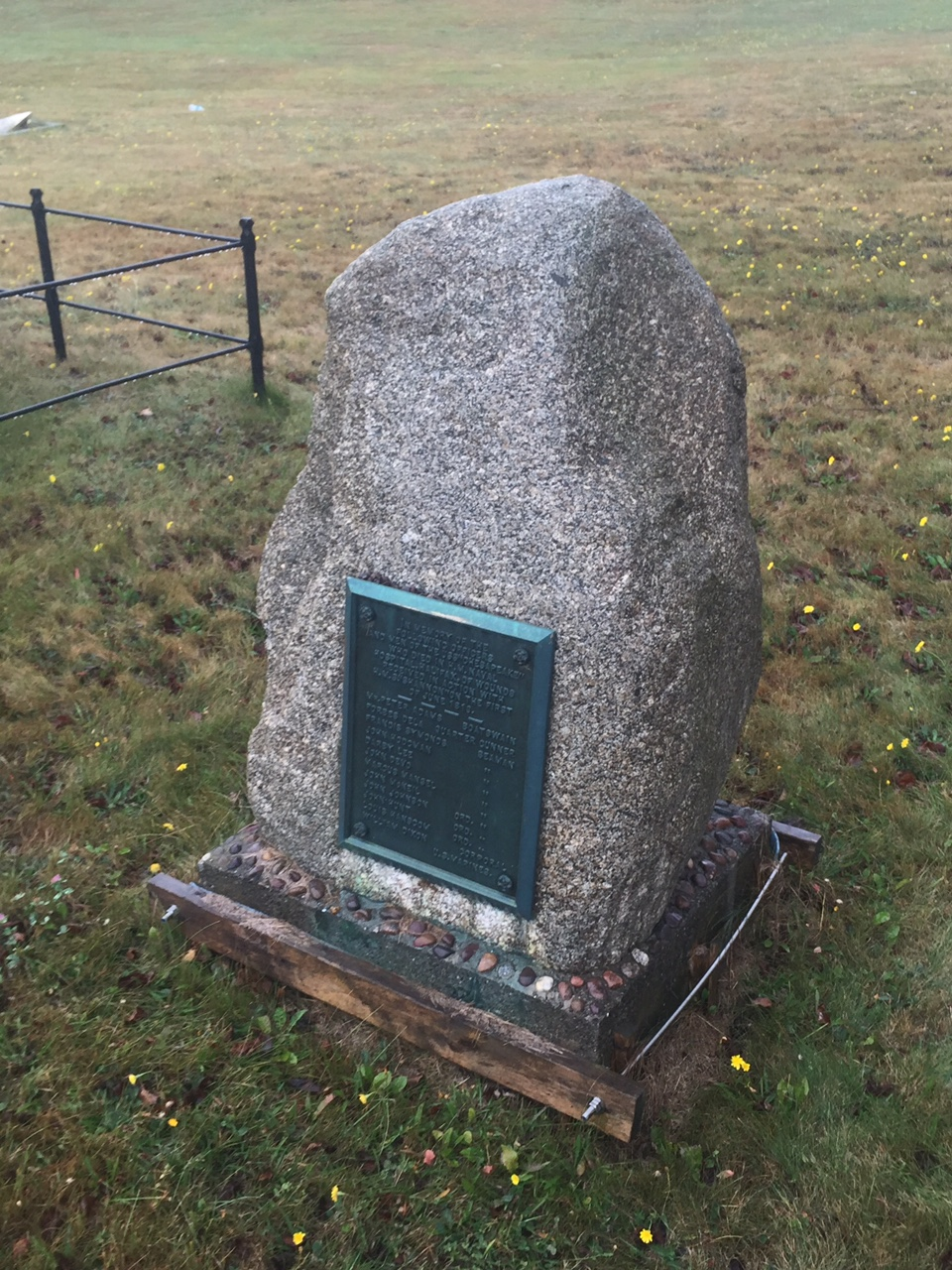
USS Chesapeake – 12 died (1813)

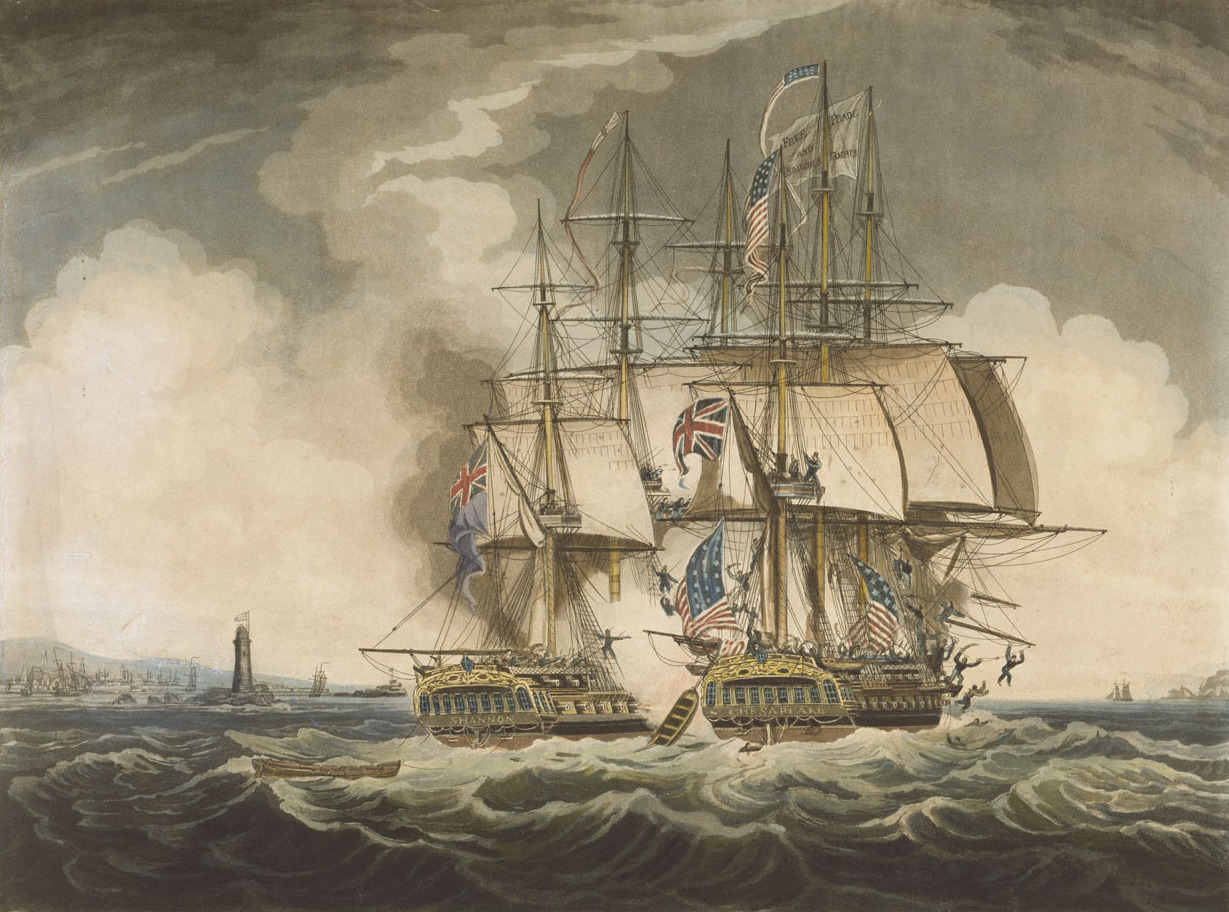
HMS Shannon capturing USS Chesapeake off Boston, 1 June 1813, by W. Elmes

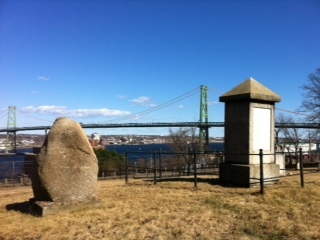
Memorials to USS Chesapeake and HMS Shannon

== See also ==
- Old Burying Ground (Halifax, Nova Scotia)
- Garrison Cemetery (Annapolis Royal, Nova Scotia)
- Military history of Nova Scotia
- Fort Moncton – oldest British military gravestones in Canada
