= Cumberland River (disambiguation) =

Cumberland River may refer to:

- Cumberland River, in the Southern United States
- Cumberland River (Victoria)
- Cumberland River (St. Vincent)
- Cumberland River (Georgia)

== See also ==
- Cumberland (disambiguation)
