= Cumberland, Ontario (disambiguation) =

Cumberland, Ontario may refer to:

- Cumberland, Ontario, a former township that has been amalgamated into the city of Ottawa, Canada
  - Cumberland, Ottawa, a village located within the above
- Cumberland Beach, a community located in Severn, Ontario

== See also ==
- Cumberland (disambiguation)
