= Cumberland County =

Cumberland County may refer to:

== Australia ==
- Cumberland County, New South Wales
- the former name of Cumberland Land District, Tasmania, Australia

== Canada ==
- Cumberland County, Nova Scotia

== United Kingdom ==
- Cumberland, historic county
- Cumberland (unitary authority), non-metropolitan county and district

== United States ==
- Cumberland County, Illinois
- Cumberland County, Kentucky
- Cumberland County, Maine
- Cumberland County, New Jersey
- Cumberland County, New York
- Cumberland County, North Carolina
- Cumberland County, Pennsylvania
- Cumberland County, Tennessee
- Cumberland County, Republic of Vermont
- Cumberland County, Virginia

== Fictional places ==
- Cumberland County, Wyoming, next door county to the setting of the Longmire television series and novels by author Craig Johnson

== See also ==
- Cumberland (disambiguation)
- Cumberland County College
