= Cumberland, New Kent County, Virginia =

Unincorporated town in Virginia, U.S.

Coordinates: 37°19′45″N 76°44′32″W

Cumberland was an unincorporated town in New Kent County in the U.S. state of Virginia that almost became the capital of Virginia colony in 1748.

== History ==
Beginning in the 1660s, Cumberland was a colonial settlement on the south side of the Pamunkey River. The first land patents for the area were granted to the Littlepage family, who settled the local area and owned extensive land and property holdings, including the Cumberland farm. In the 1740s, the Littlepage family contributed some of their land to the government to establish the town of Cumberland.

In the mid 1700s, Cumberland was a thriving colonial river port and trading center, with a tobacco inspection station, a ferry, and warehouses. During the American Revolutionary War, a military hospital and public supply depot were established in Cumberland.

After the Williamsburg Capitol building was burned in 1748, Cumberland came within three votes of replacing Williamsburg as the capital of the Virginia colony during proceedings of the House of Burgesses.

In May 1862, Cumberland town was occupied by George B. McClellan and over 100,000 Union Army troops to commence the Peninsula campaign of the American Civil War.
