= Cumberland station =

Cumberland station may refer to:

- Cumberland station (CTA), an "L" train station in Chicago
- Cumberland station (Maryland), an Amtrak station in Cumberland, Maryland
- Cumberland station (Western Maryland Railway), a Western Maryland Scenic Railroad station in Cumberland, Maryland
- Cumberland station (Metra), a station in Des Plaines, Illinois
- Cumberland Avenue station (Tampa), a TECO Line Streetcar station in Tampa, Florida
- Cumberland Street railway station, in Glasgow, Scotland

== See also ==
- Cumberland (disambiguation)
