= Cumberland (surname) =

Cumberland is a surname. Notable people with the surname include:

- Frederick William Cumberland (1821–1881), engineer and politician
- George Cumberland (1754–1848), art collector and artist
- Jarron Cumberland (born 1997), American basketball player
- Jessie Landale Cumberland (1861–1935), British governess and suffragette
- Ken Cumberland (1913–2011), New Zealand geography academic and local-body politician.
- Richard Cumberland (dramatist) (1732–1811), civil servant and dramatist
- Richard Cumberland (philosopher) (1631–1718), bishop and philosopher
- Roger Cumberland (1894–1938), American Presbyterian missionary killed in Iraq
- Thomas Cumberland, English footballer
- Vic Cumberland (1877–1927), Australian Rules footballer
