= HMS Cumberland (1842) =

Ship of the line of the Royal Navy

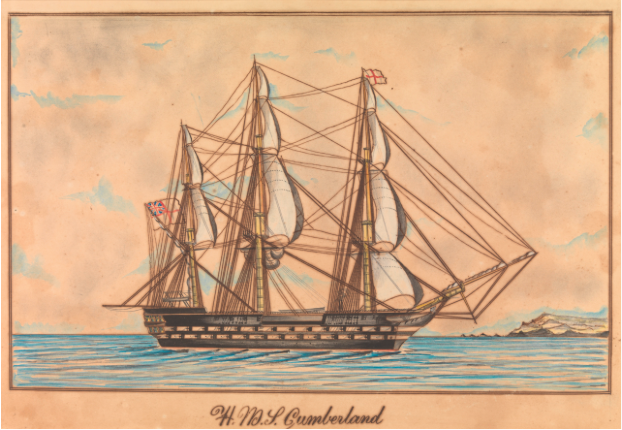
- H.M.S. Cumberland, c.1852

History

United Kingdom
- Name: HMS Cumberland
- Builder: Chatham Dockyard
- Laid down: April 1836
- Launched: 21 October 1842
- Fate: Burned 17 February 1889

General characteristics
- Class & type: 70-gun third rate ship of the line
- Tons burthen: 2214 bm
- Length: 180 ft (55 m) (gundeck)
- Beam: 54 ft 3 in (16.54 m)
- Depth of hold: 22 ft 4 in (6.81 m)
- Propulsion: Sails
- Sail plan: Full-rigged ship
- Armament: 70 guns: Gundeck: 24 × 32 pdrs, 2 × 68 pdr carronades; Upper gundeck: 26 × 32 pdrs, 2 × 68 pdr carronades; Quarterdeck: 8 × 32 pdr carronades; Forecastle: 2 × 32 pdrs, 2 × 32 pdr carronades

HMS Cumberland was a 70-gun third rate ship of the line of the Royal Navy, launched on 21 October 1842 at Chatham Dockyard. She carried a crew of 620 men.

Cumberland recommissioned as a flagship under Captain George Henry Seymour as the flagship of his father, Vice-Admiral Sir George Francis Seymour. She served on the North America and West Indies Station. In March 1854 she sailed to the Baltic Sea as the Crimean War with Russia was imminent. Cumberland was involved in the Battle of Bomarsund, an Anglo-French attack on Bomarsund in the Grand Duchy of Finland in August 1854. On 15 March 1858, Cumberland ran aground on an uncharted rock in the River Plate off the Isla de Flores, Uruguay. Her captain and master were both acquitted at the subsequent court martial held on board HMS Impregnable at HMNB Devonport on 11 August.

Cumberland was converted by The Clyde Industrial Training Ship Association to serve as a training ship for destitute and homeless boys from Glasgow in 1869. She was destroyed in an arson attack by young sailors at Rhu on the Gareloch in Scotland on 17 February 1889.

The Association replaced her with HMS Revenge (1859) in 1891, on condition her name was changed to HMS Empress. The Revenge was a 91-gun screw powered second rate launched in 1859 and had been used as a base ship from 1872 The Association renamed as The Clyde Industrial Training Ship Empress Association converted her into a training ship, she was used as such until eventually sold for breaking in 1923.

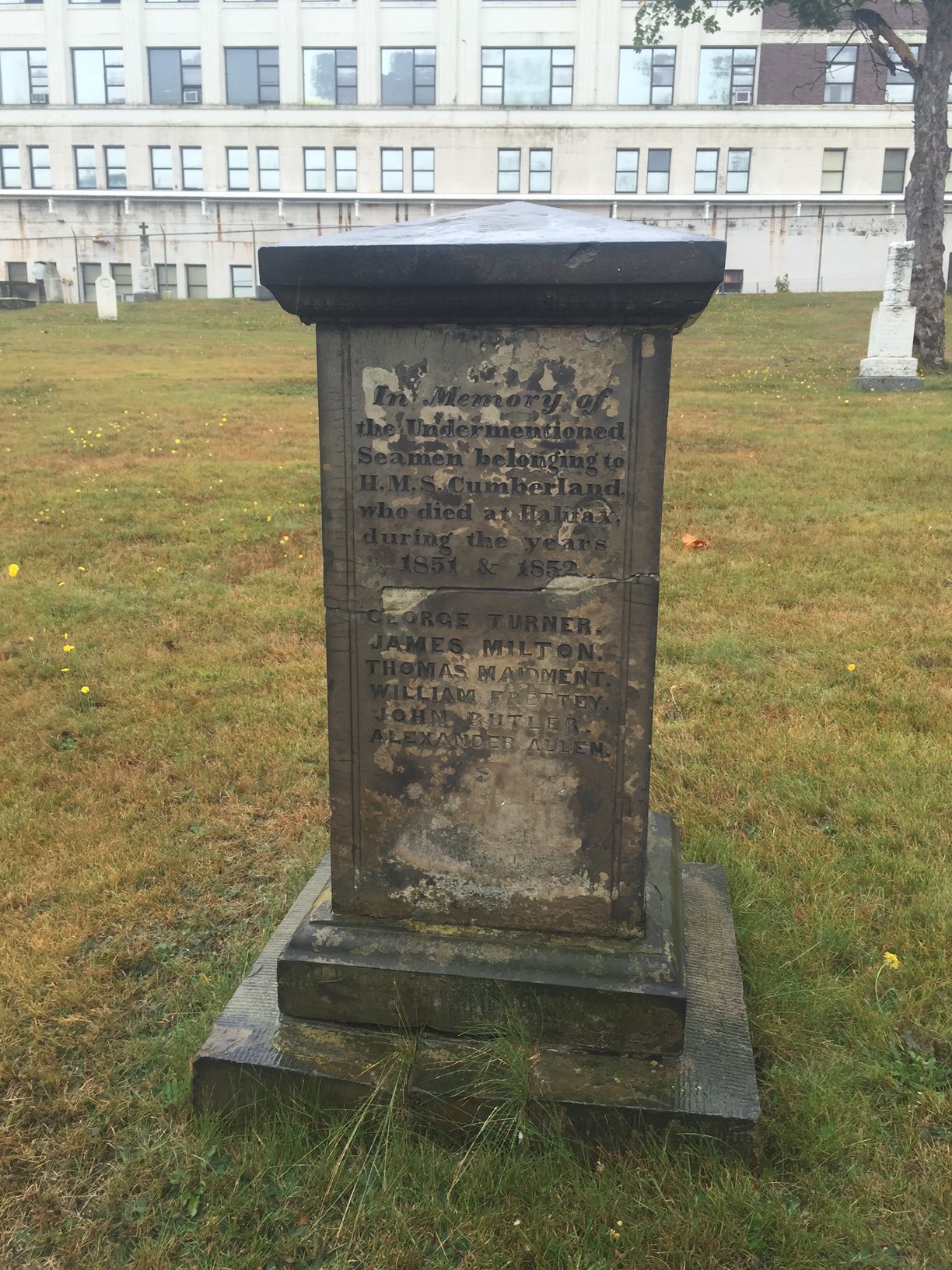
Monument to the 6 crew of HMS Cumberland that died at Halifax, Royal Navy Burying Ground (Halifax, Nova Scotia)
