= HMS Cumberland =

Eleven ships of the Royal Navy have borne the name HMS Cumberland, after the traditional English county of Cumberland, England:

- HMS Cumberland (1695) was an 80-gun third rate ship of the line launched in 1695. She was captured by the French in the Battle at the Lizard in 1707. In 1715 she was sold to Genoa, in 1717 to Spain and renamed Principe de Asturias. Then captured back by Britain at the Battle of Cape Passaro in 1718 and sold to Austria in 1720, and renamed San Carlos.
- HMS Cumberland (1710) was an 80-gun third rate launched in 1710. She was rebuilt in 1739 to carry 66 guns and foundered at anchor in 1760.
- HMS Cumberland (1739) was an 8-gun fire ship, previously the civilian Alex Roberts. She was purchased in 1739 and was broken up by 1742.
- HMS Cumberland (1745) was an 8-gun fire ship in service in 1745.
- HMS Cumberland (1774) was a 74-gun third rate launched in 1774 and broken up in 1805.
- HMS Cumberland (1803) was a schooner launched at Port Jackson in 1801 that the Royal Navy purchased in 1803. The French seized her in December. The Royal Navy recaptured her in 1810 and immediately sold her.
- HMS Cumberland (1807) was a 74-gun third rate launched in 1807. She was converted to a convict ship in 1830 and was renamed HMS Fortitude in 1833. She was put on the sale list in 1870 and was subsequently sold.
- HMS Cumberland (1842) was a 70-gun third rate launched in 1842. She was used as a training ship from 1870, and was burnt in 1889. The wreck was broken up later that year.
- HMS Cumberland (1902) was a Monmouth-class armoured cruiser launched in 1902. She was sold in 1921 and was broken up in 1923.
- HMS Cumberland (57) was a County-class heavy cruiser launched in 1926 and broken up in 1959.
- HMS Cumberland (F85) was a Type 22 frigate launched in 1986 and decommissioned on 23 June 2011.

== Battle honours ==
- Sadras 1758
- Negapatam 1758
- Porto Novo 1759
- Cape St. Vincent 1780
- Baltic 1854
- Cameroons 1914
- North Africa 1942
- Arctic 1942–1943
- Sabang 1944
- Burma 1945

== See also ==
- USS Cumberland
