= Thomas Cumberland =

English football goalkeeper

Personal information
- Full name: Thomas William Cumberland
- Date of birth: 1882
- Place of birth: Derby, England
- Position: Goalkeeper

Senior career*
Years	Team	Apps	(Gls)
- Southwell St Mary's
1902–1903	Lincoln City	5	(0)
- Southwell St Mary's
- Grantham Avenue
- Southwell St Mary's
- Brentford
- Sutton Junction
- Sutton Town
- * Club domestic league appearances and goals

Thomas William Cumberland was an English footballer who played in the Football League for Lincoln City as a goalkeeper.

== Career statistics ==
Appearances and goals by club, season and competition
Club	Season	League			FA Cup		Total	
Club	Season	Division	Apps	Goals	Apps	Goals	Apps	Goals
Lincoln City	1902–03	Second Division	5	0	1	0	6	0
Career total			5	0	1	0	6	0
