= Cumberland (New Kent, Virginia) =

Historic house in Virginia, United States

- U.S. National Register of Historic Places
- U.S. Historic district
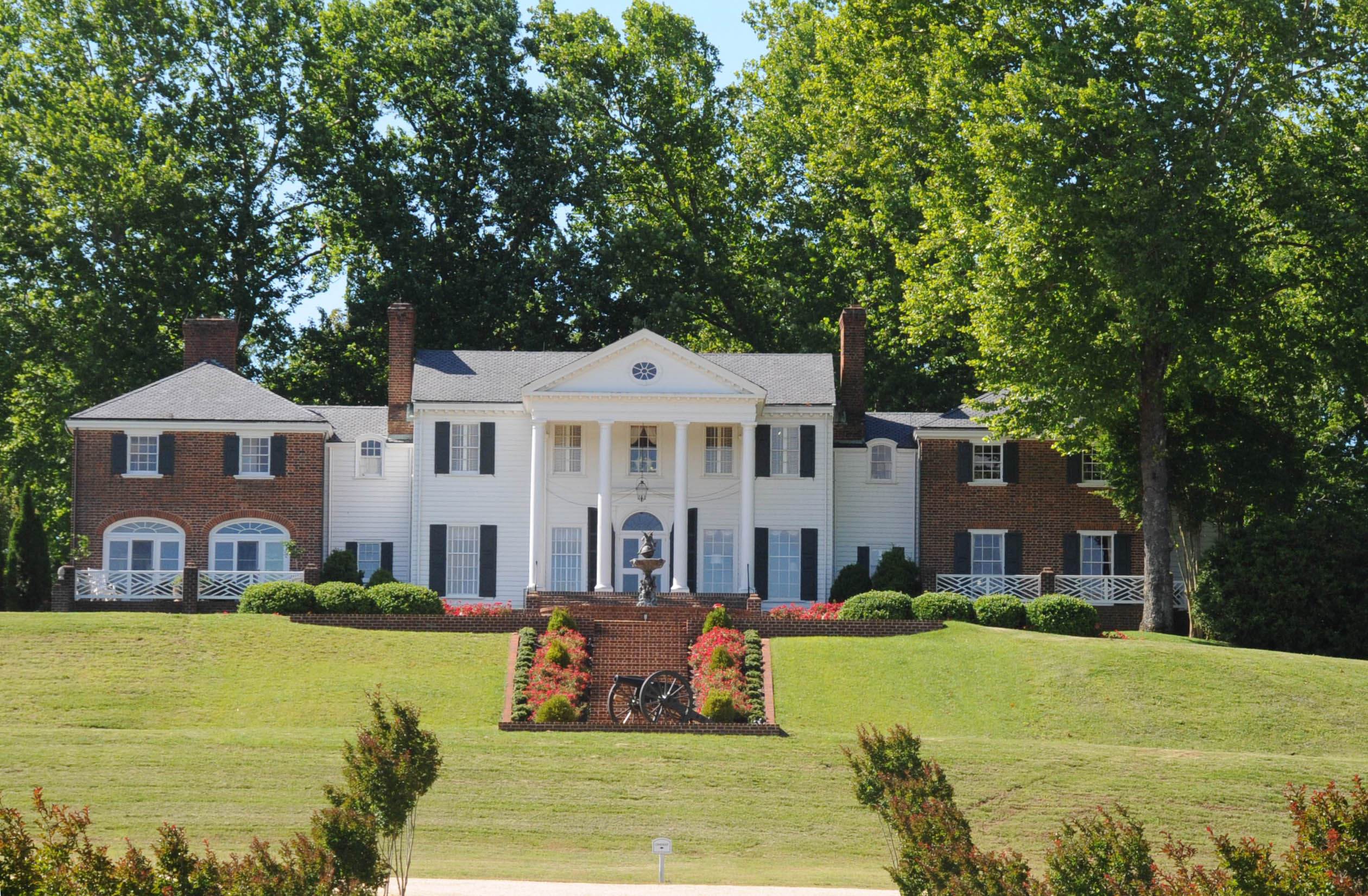

- Location within Virginia Location within the United States
- Location: 9007 Cumberland Rd., vicinity of New Kent, Virginia
- Coordinates: 37°32′23″N 76°58′39″W
- Area: 131 acres (53 ha)
- Built: 1775-1783; c. 1938
- Architectural style: Georgian; Classical Revival; Colonial Revival
- NRHP reference No.: 100000986
- Added to NRHP: May 8, 2017

Cumberland is a historic farm property at 9007 Cumberland Road in central northern New Kent County, Virginia. The property, now about 131 acres (53 ha), was once the centerpiece of a much larger plantation estate. The main house has a construction history dating to the 18th century, and includes a number of interior features from that period. The exterior is largely the product of a 1930s update of the property to a design by Harden de Valsen Pratt, a major restoration architect. Other historic elements of the property include a barn and the family cemetery of the Toler and Fauntleroy families, who owned the property for over a century.

The property was listed on the National Register of Historic Places in 2017.

== See also ==
- National Register of Historic Places listings in New Kent County, Virginia
