= USS Cumberland =

Three ships of the United States Navy have been named Cumberland, after the Cumberland River.

- USS Cumberland (1842) was a 50-gun sailing frigate launched in 1842 and sunk by CSS Virginia in 1862.
- USS Cumberland (IX-8) was a steel-hulled sailing bark launched 17 August 1904 and disposed of in 1947.
- USS Cumberland (AO-153) was a fleet oiler launched in 1944 and scrapped in 1972.

== See also ==
- USS Cumberland Sound (AV-17) (1944)
- HMS Cumberland
